= Santa Corona, Vicenza =

Coordinates: 45°32′57″N 11°32′51″E

Church of Santa Corona
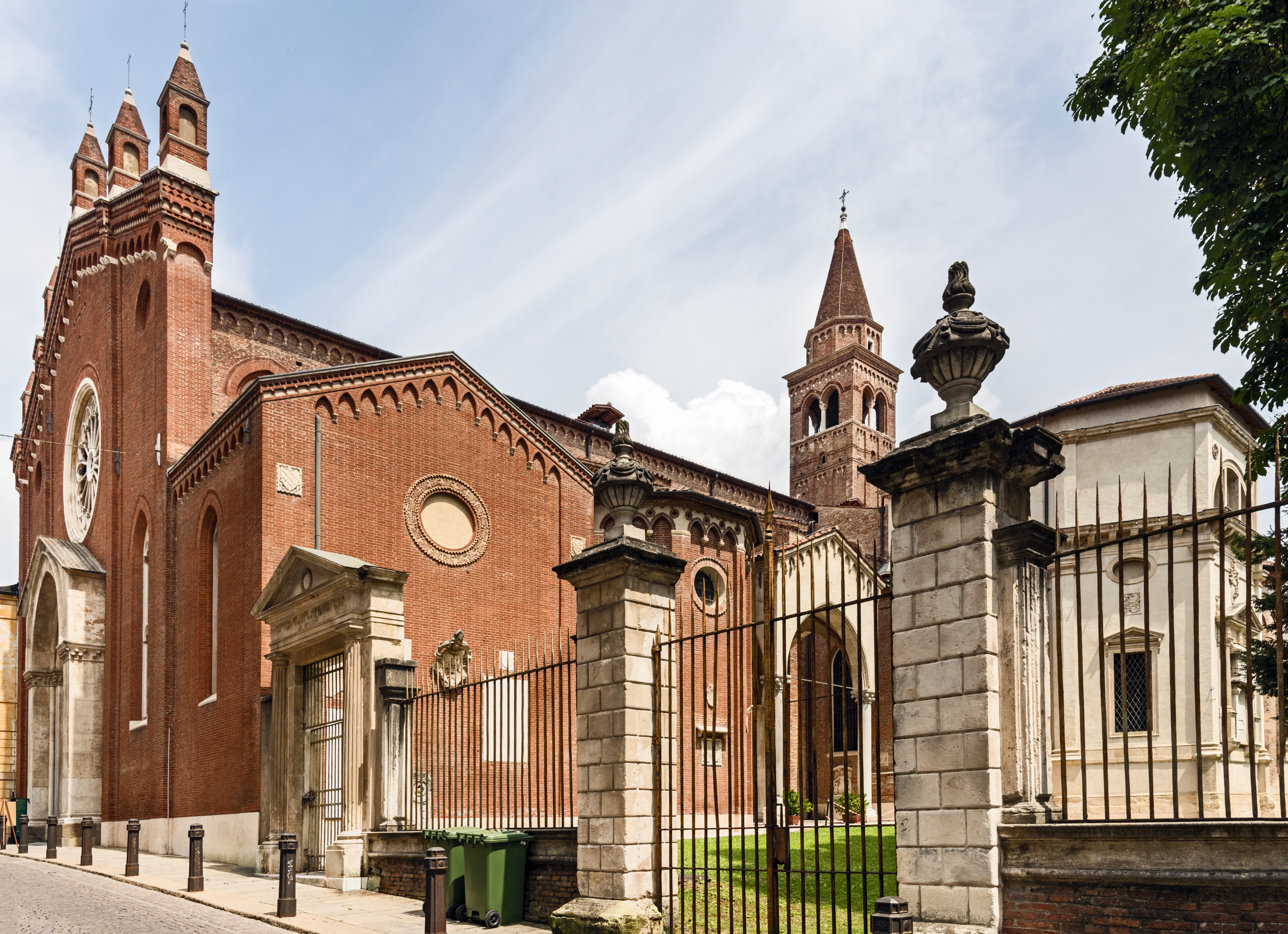
- The facade and side of the Church of Santa Corona as seen from Corso Palladio.

Religion
- Affiliation: Roman Catholic
- Province: Vicenza, Veneto
- Year consecrated: 13th century

Location
- Location: Vicenza, Italy
- Interactive map of Church of Santa Corona

Architecture
- Type: Church
- Style: Gothic church, Renaissance chapel.
- Groundbreaking: 1261
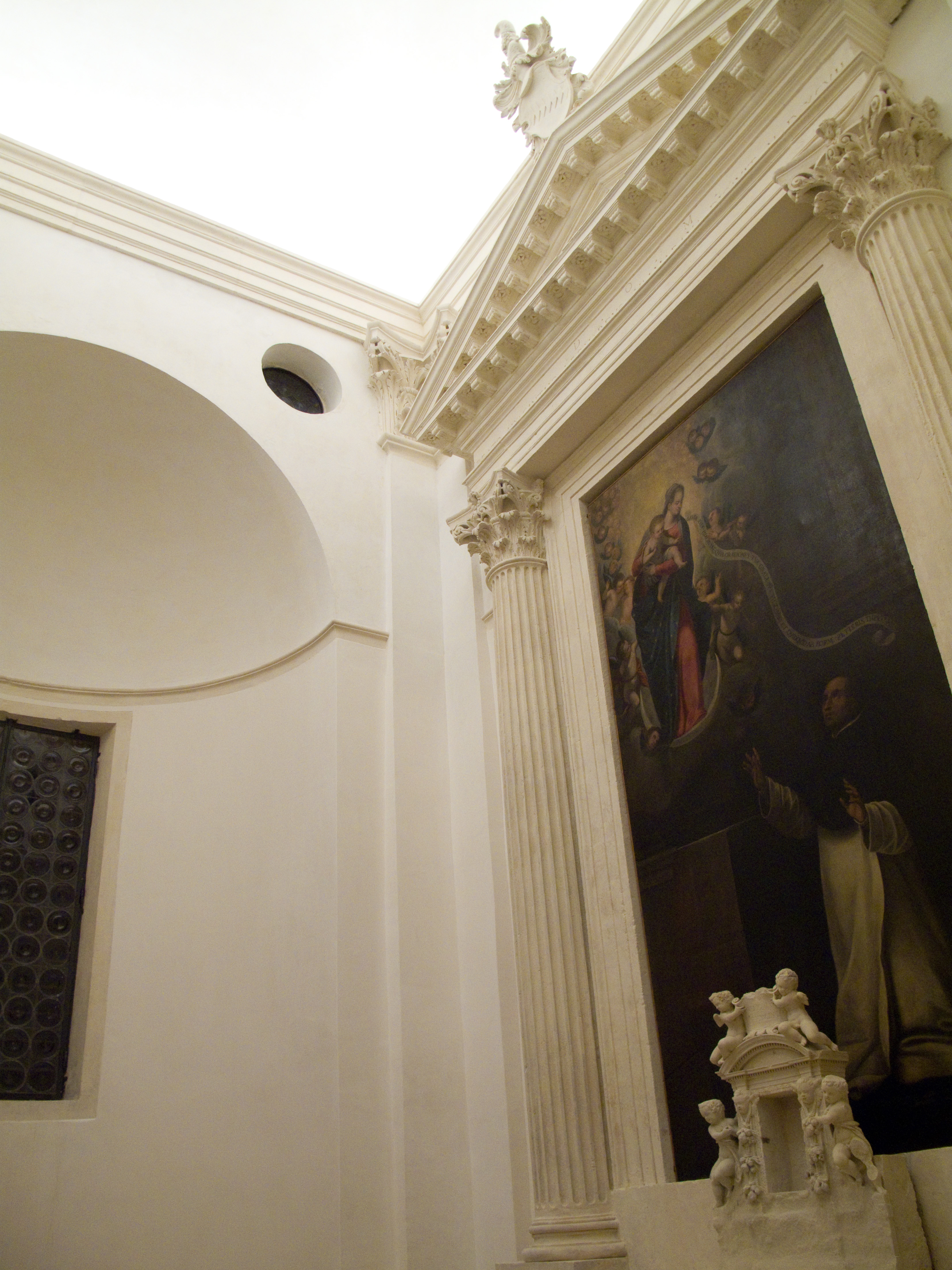

- Location within Veneto Location within Italy

UNESCO World Heritage Site
- Location: Vicenza, Province of Vicenza, Veneto, Italy
- Part of: City of Vicenza and the Palladian Villas of the Veneto
- Criteria: Cultural: (i)(ii)
- Reference: 712bis-001
- Inscription: 1994 (18th Session)

The Santa Corona complex in Vicenza comprises one of the city’s most important churches—constructed in the second half of the 13th century and enriched over the centuries with numerous works of art—and the cloisters of the former convent of the Dominicans. It forms part of the city’s museum network. The Church of Santa Corona houses Renaissance paintings and the Valmarana Chapel, designed by Andrea Palladio, while the former convent serves as the home of the Naturalistic Archaeological Museum.

== History ==
=== 13th–14th centuries: A symbolic site of the city ===
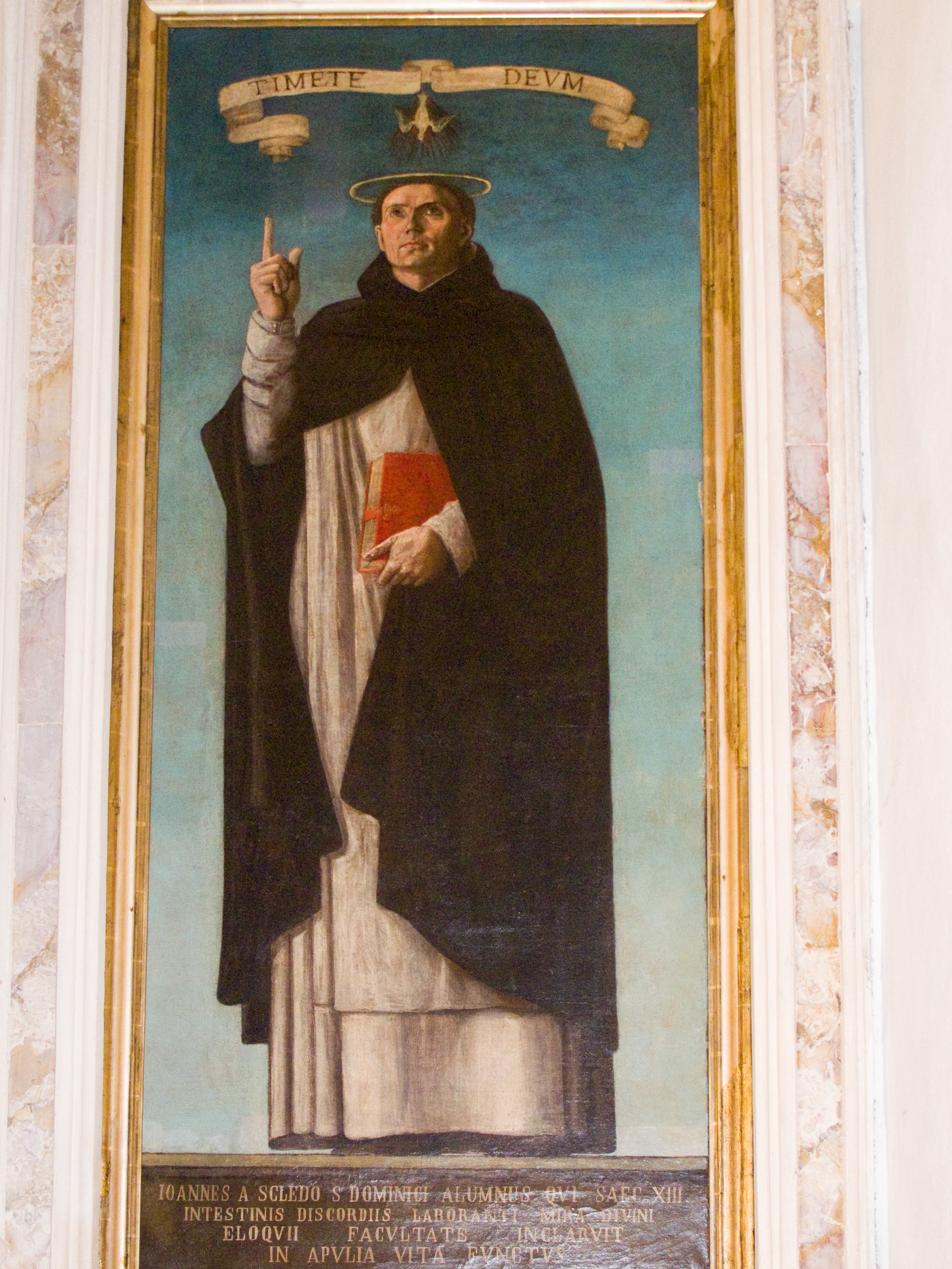
San Domenico Chapel – Giovanni da Schio

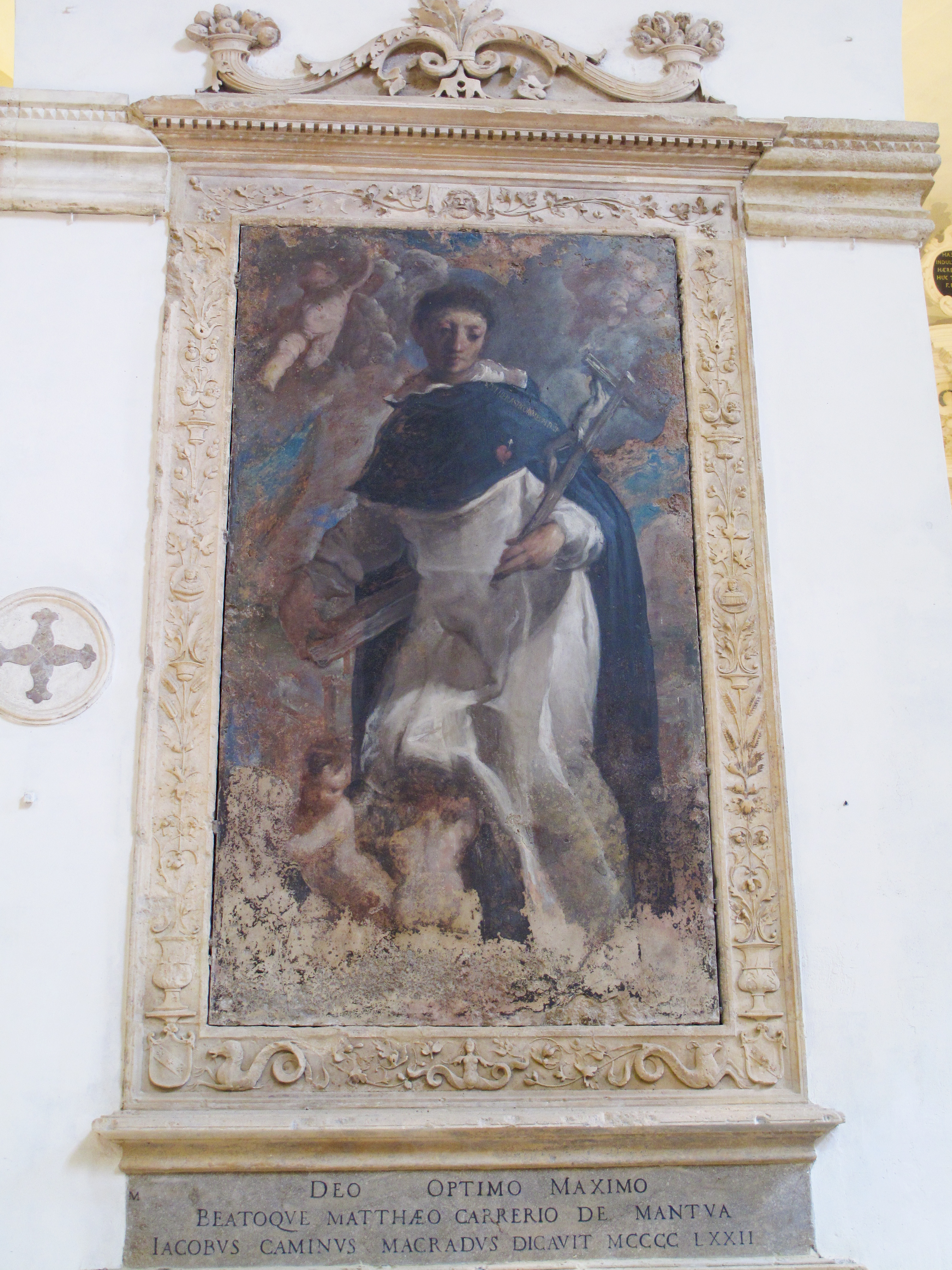
Matteo Carrerio, Dominican builder of the convent

The church was built at the behest of the Municipality of Vicenza, which, in October 1260, decided to erect a grand temple to house one of the thorns from the crown of Christ. This relic had been gifted to the blessed Bartholomew of Breganze, bishop of Vicenza from 1259 to 1270, by King Louis IX of France in Paris. The bishop aimed to bring about a profound political and religious renewal in the city. Following the tyrannical rule of Ezzelino III da Romano, the free Commune of Vicenza had been restored, and Bishop Bartholomew sought to counter, through the Dominicans—of which he was a member—the heresies prevalent in the city, particularly the well-established Cathar church, as well as civic issues such as family disputes and widespread usury. Consequently, Bishop Bartholomew entrusted the management of the church to his Dominican friars.

The construction of the church was supported by the enthusiasm of the entire population. Its location, rich in symbolic meaning, was chosen in the contrà del Collo, where the Cathar church and Ezzelino’s fortified seat, the Castrum Thealdum, had once stood. The Commune acquired land and rights on the slope descending toward the Bacchiglione River, and private citizens donated houses and palaces. Thus, the church was built—exceptionally large for its time and clearly derived from the Lombard prototypes of Cistercian abbeys—starting in 1261 and completed in less than a decade, at least in its essential parts.

However, the political climate soon changed: in 1264, Vicenza was subjugated by Padua, and Bartholomew lost much of his influence, spending his final years in distress and disappointment. He even requested Pope Clement IV to relieve him of his diocesan duties, but the pope did not accept his resignation. Bartholomew died in 1270 in Vicenza, after designating the Dominican convent of Santa Corona, then under construction, as the universal heir of his possessions. He was buried in the church, which was by then completed.

The following year, the first cloister—the smaller one, largely destroyed during the Anglo-American bombings of 1944—was built adjacent to the northern side of the church. The prestige of the Dominicans in the city grew, particularly after Pope Boniface VIII assigned them the Office of the Inquisition in 1303, replacing the Franciscans who had committed serious abuses. This office was established in the Santa Corona convent, and in 1327, when Vicenza had come under Scaliger rule, the Commune granted a plot of land—further evidence of the civic importance attributed to the mendicant orders—to build a dedicated house for the Inquisition. This tribunal remained in the convent until its suppression by Napoleon in 1797; it was briefly reconstituted under the Austrian government but was definitively abolished in 1820. The Inquisition’s activities were not solely spiritual: since it also prosecuted usurers, these individuals often made amends by donating to the church and charitable works rather than repaying the victims directly. By the 14th century, noble families such as the Da Sarego and Thiene began building their own altars and chapels in Santa Corona.

During this period, Santa Corona was the heart of Vicenza’s religious and civic life: the feast and procession of the Holy Thorn were celebrated with utmost solemnity, with procedures even prescribed by municipal statutes, and involved all the city’s guilds, led by those of judges and notaries. Even during the general religious decline that affected convents from the mid-14th century, the Dominicans—reformed by the Observance movement, supported by both municipal authorities and Venice—and the church maintained their prestige in the city.

The Dominicans also oversaw the nuns who, almost concurrently, established themselves in the city at the ancient borough near the Roblandine church in the San Domenico monastery. This monastery quickly amassed significant wealth through dowries brought by postulants, many from noble or affluent families. Some of these assets were donated to the Santa Corona convent, which enjoyed considerable privileges, including exemptions from tithing and taxes imposed by the Roman Curia, ensuring a relatively prosperous economic condition.

Santa Corona was also a center of culture: in 1372, the Dominicans, in gratitude to the Vicentines who had generously supported their General Chapter, opened a public school of philosophy in the convent. A school may have existed as early as the 13th century, alongside a library that housed the significant collection of books bequeathed by Bishop Bartholomew.

In 1463, a brief from Pope Pius II transferred the convent of Santa Corona to the Observants, toward whom both the population and the civic and Venetian authorities had always been favorable. Following this, the conventual community experienced significant growth.

=== 15th–18th centuries: A symbolic place for noble families ===
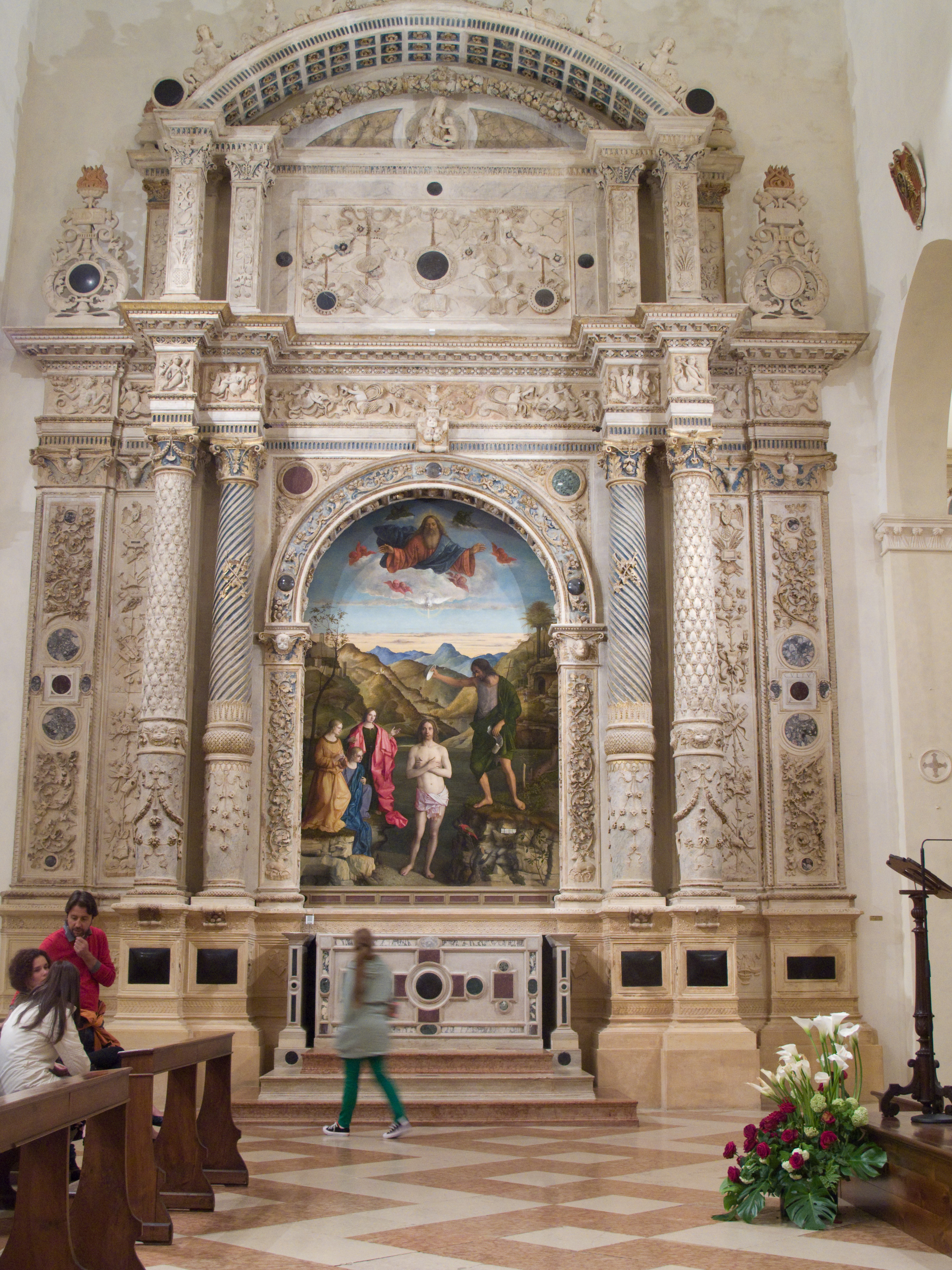
Garzadori Altar

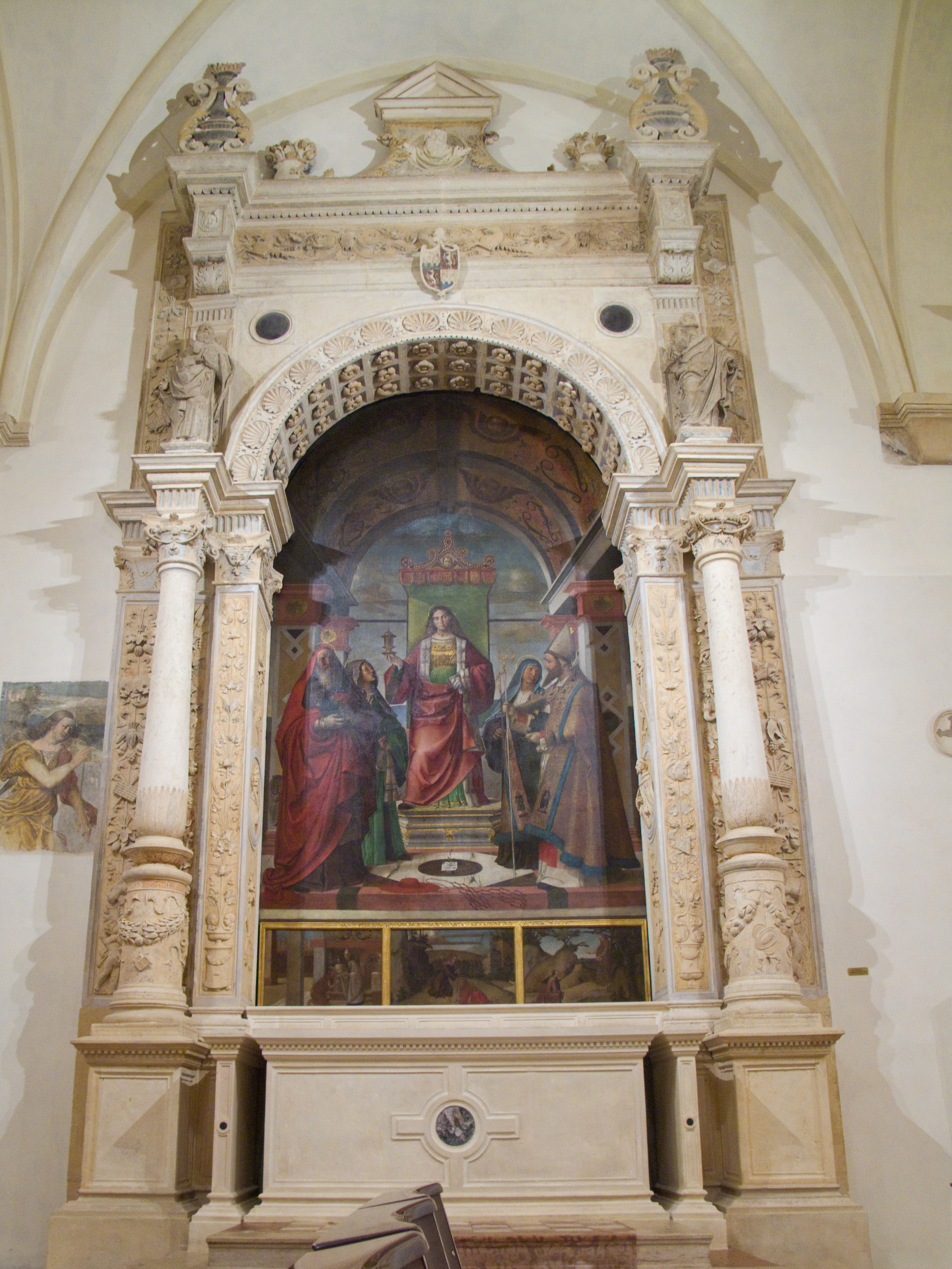
Pagello Altar

During the 15th century, under the dominion of the Republic of Venice, Vicenza lost political significance. The city’s symbolic sites were then occupied by noble families who, under the pact of devotion to Venice, governed the territory. These families, driven by prestige but also by spiritual motives, first embraced the late Gothic style from Venice and later the Renaissance style from central Italy, adorning the city with palaces and enriching its churches with splendid works of art. Often, their patronage was motivated by a desire for a privileged burial place to ensure their salvation: many noble wills expressed a wish to be buried in Santa Corona, accompanied by bequests to the church.

Throughout the 15th century, many side chapels were constructed, and between 1481 and 1489, Santa Corona underwent significant modifications by Lorenzo da Bologna with the construction of the large apse, crypt, and transept. These structures were enriched over the following decades with increasingly elaborate artifacts, losing the austerity of the original construction. The funding for this substantial renovation came from noble families to whom the chapels were dedicated, the Commune, and the generous contributions of the Vicentine population, as when Cardinal Bishop Zeno, under a privilege from Pope Alexander VI, granted a plenary indulgence. As for the families, they competed to build chapels and altars: the Nievo and Monza erected two small chapels that were replaced in the 17th century by the Rosario Chapel, the Barbaran built the large transept chapel, and the Pagello, Monza, and Garzadori constructed altars along the left nave.

The crypt’s construction was granted in 1481 to the noble Valmarana family in exchange for their former chapel (now called the Holy Thorn Chapel). In 1520, the precious reliquary was transferred there, and it was consecrated as the Sanctuary of the Holy Thorn by Vicenza’s Archbishop Lodovico Chiericati in 1550. In the second half of the 16th century, the right side of the crypt was opened with the construction, based on designs by Andrea Palladio, of the Valmarana Chapel. From 1613 to 1642, the grand Rosario Chapel was built to commemorate the victorious Battle of Lepanto against the Turks.

Santa Corona was also home to confraternities, which at the time represented the greatest expression of the city’s religious life. Around 1450, the Confraternity of Saint Peter Martyr built the second chapel on the right nave, where it continued to gather until the Napoleonic suppression. In 1520, the Confraternity of Mercy renovated the Madonna of the Stars altar, and in 1562, thriving due to the presence of many affluent members, it built a first oratory, known as the Turchini, now lost, adjacent to the cloister, and a second oratory in the open field of the church’s cemetery. The Confraternity of the Rosary, established in the second half of the 16th century and renovated after the Battle of Lepanto, was influential due to the presence of wealthy merchants. It was based in Santa Corona, where it funded the construction of the eponymous chapel, which became the center of a devotion that spread rapidly across the territory. These were joined by the Confraternities of the Third Order of Saint Dominic.

Highlighting the Dominicans’ importance in the city during this period, around 1477, the dormitory and three sides of the larger cloister—the second in chronological order—were constructed. A few years later, with the generous contribution of Cristoforo Barbaran—who simultaneously funded the construction of his family’s large chapel in the right transept—the refectory and library were built, where, until the 17th century, municipal records were also stored. In the early 16th century, due to the dangers posed by the War of the League of Cambrai, the number of friars living at Santa Corona decreased but began to grow again after the conflict. In 1532, with the addition of the fourth side of the larger cloister, the convent complex was completed.

Andrea Palladio designed the Valmarana Chapel in the crypt, likely in 1576, on the occasion of Antonio Valmarana’s death, although it was not completed until 1597 by Leonardo Valmarana, the architect’s brother, after Palladio’s death. However, some argue that the date 1597, inscribed on a plaque on the floor, refers not to the chapel’s construction but to the transfer of the remains of parents and siblings, carried out by Leonardo, who in his will claimed responsibility for the chapel’s construction.

In the 17th century, life in the convent continued much as it had in the previous century. There was an emphasis on religious activities, such as establishing numerous Rosary Confraternities in nearly all of the territory's parishes, as well as organizing the convent school more effectively. Further renovations to the church and convent complex continued into the 17th and early 18th centuries.

=== 19th–20th centuries: Decline ===
Throughout the 18th century, the Santa Corona convent remained highly functional, with a community of around 25 religious members, including teachers and students. Each year, the feasts of Saint Pope Pius V, the Dominican pope of the Battle of Lepanto, as well as those of the Madonna of the Snow and the Holy Thorn, were solemnly celebrated.

However, in 1797, with the arrival of French troops, the convent was partially occupied. After the democratic government ended, the Dominicans returned to the convent from 1801 to 1810, but following Napoleon’s Compiègne decree, which ordered the dissolution of religious orders and confraternities, they were forced to leave permanently. Due to the reorganization of the city’s parishes, Santa Corona became the main subsidiary church of the Santo Stefano parish. In 1812, the Confraternity of the Rosary was dissolved, and its oratory was demolished.

With the Conservative Order, Vicenza was incorporated into the Kingdom of Lombardy-Venetia, part of the deeply Catholic Austrian Empire. However, an era had irreversibly ended, particularly that of a medieval society founded on the power of noble families; with it, Santa Corona lost its symbolic role and never regained its former prominence.

The entire complex became municipal property in 1810; the convent buildings were converted into hospitals and schools. In 1811, part of the complex became the seat of the new Gymnasium and, later, in 1877, of the Technical Industrial Institute founded by Alessandro Rossi.

Between 1872 and 1874, significant modifications were made to the former convent buildings to adapt them to new educational needs, particularly to allow the construction of workshops. The Allied air raid on May 14, 1944, severely damaged the two cloisters, causing significant harm to the smaller cloister adjacent to the church and the ancient library it contained. In 1962, the “A. Rossi” Institute moved to its new location on Via Legione Gallieno; the partially restored convent buildings have housed the Naturalistic Archaeological Museum of Vicenza since 1991.

In 2009, during the restoration of the religious building, the Diocesan Museum hosted the temporary exhibition “Treasures from Santa Corona,” ensuring public access to the most significant works housed in the complex during the works.

== Description and works of art ==
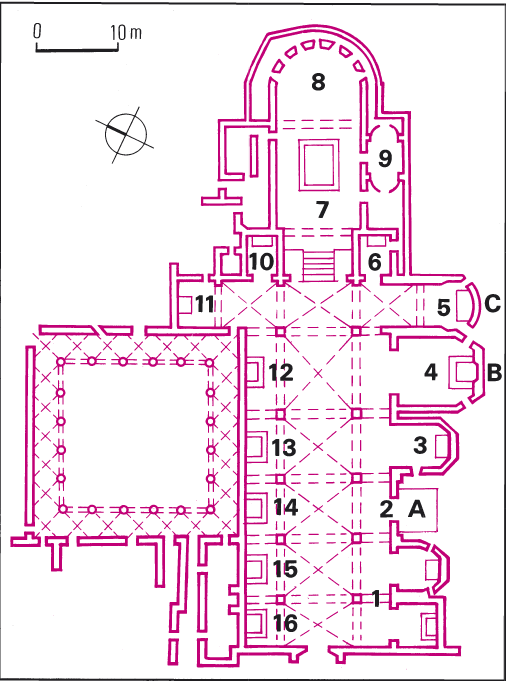
Map

=== Facade and right side ===
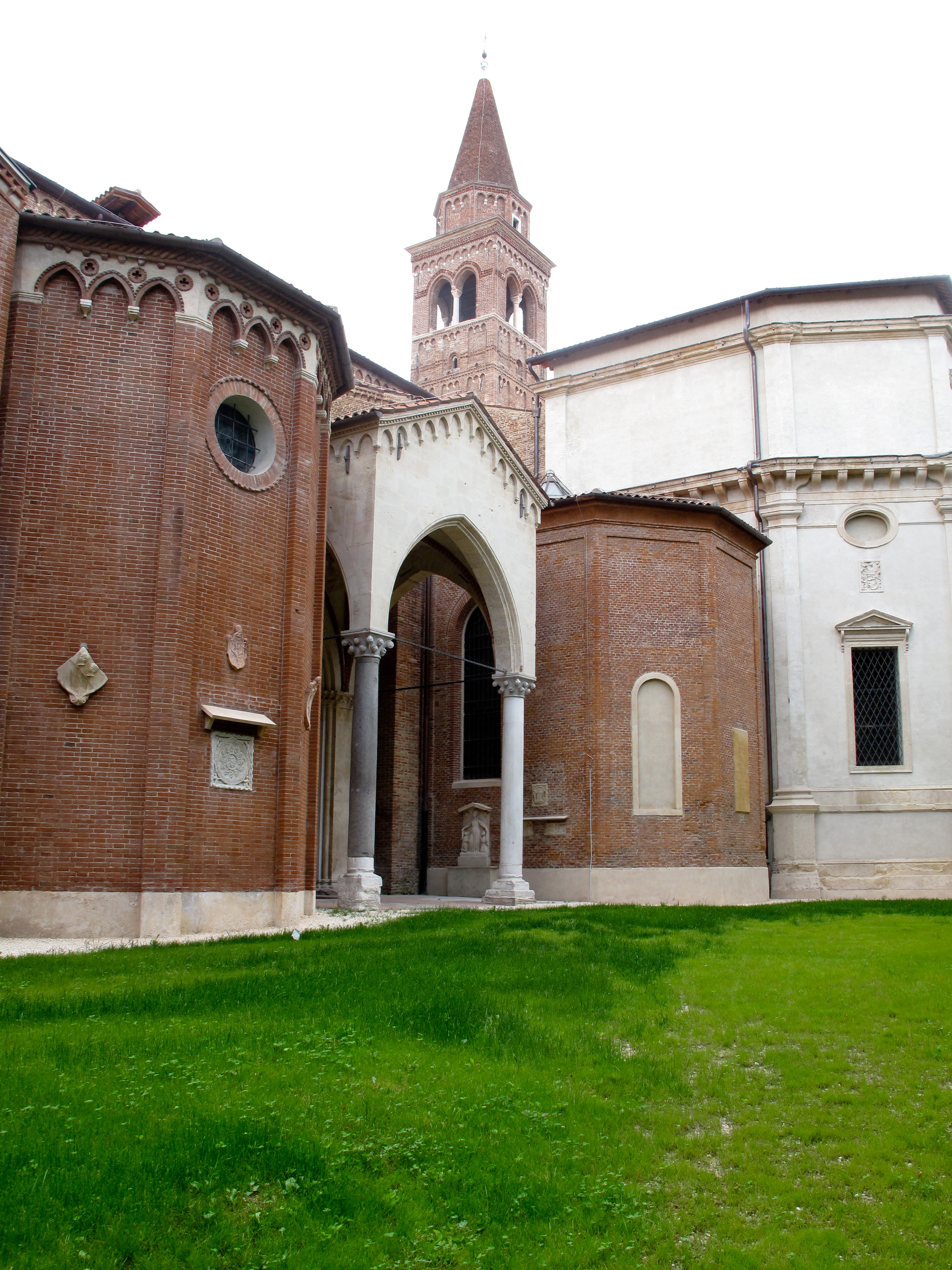
Right side with the chapels and the prothyrum of the side door

The facade is gabled, constructed in exposed brick like the entire building, and vertically divided by pilasters in the central section. It is crowned by a tall, multi-banded decorated cornice resting on a series of blind arches, which in turn supports five pinnacles with metal crosses. The facade features a large rose window flanked by two oculi, positioned above the entrance portal, which is characterized by a pronounced splay. On the lateral sections, above the naves, there are two monoforas and, below, two very tall windows containing slender biforas.

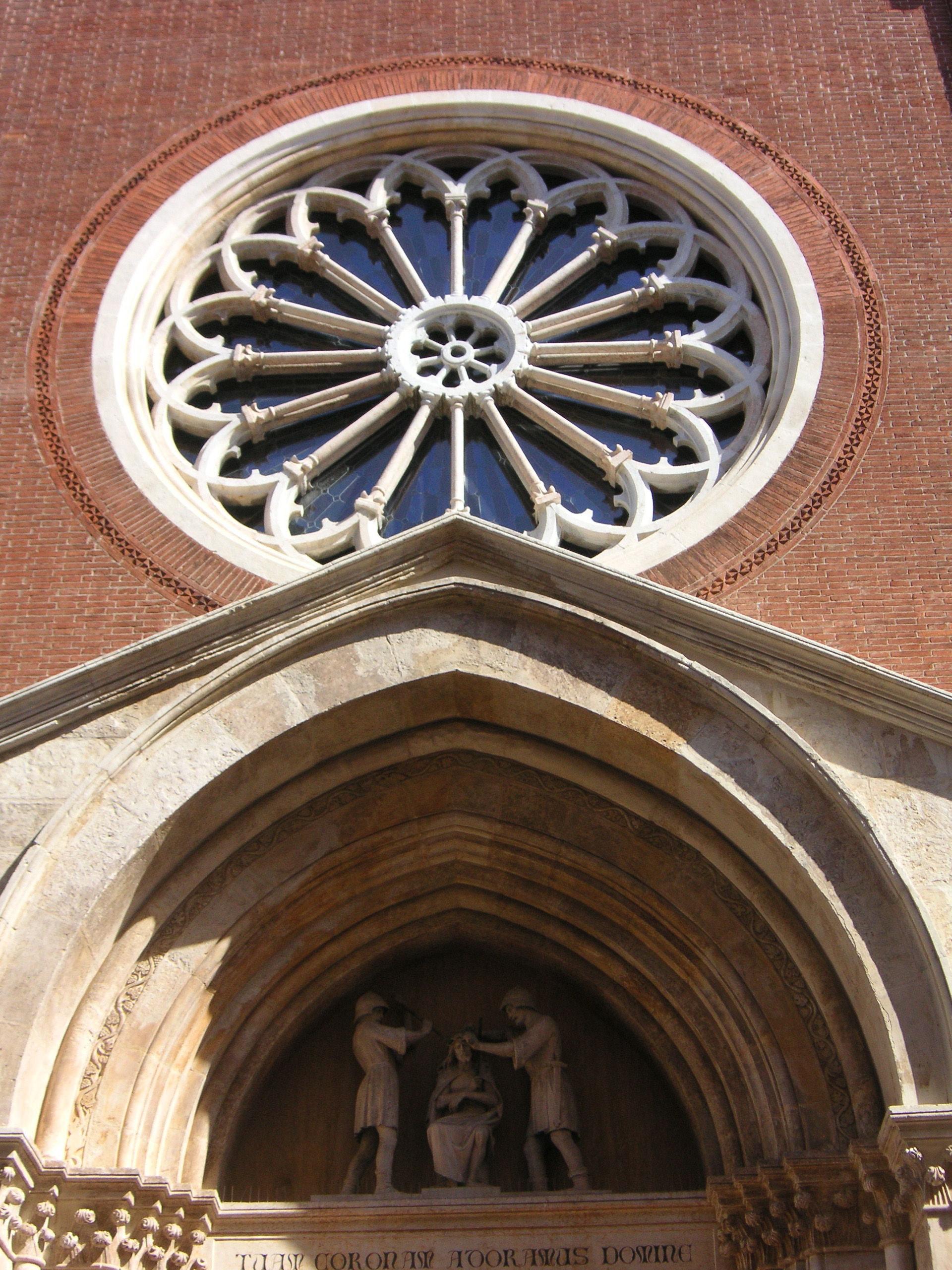
Rose window of the facade

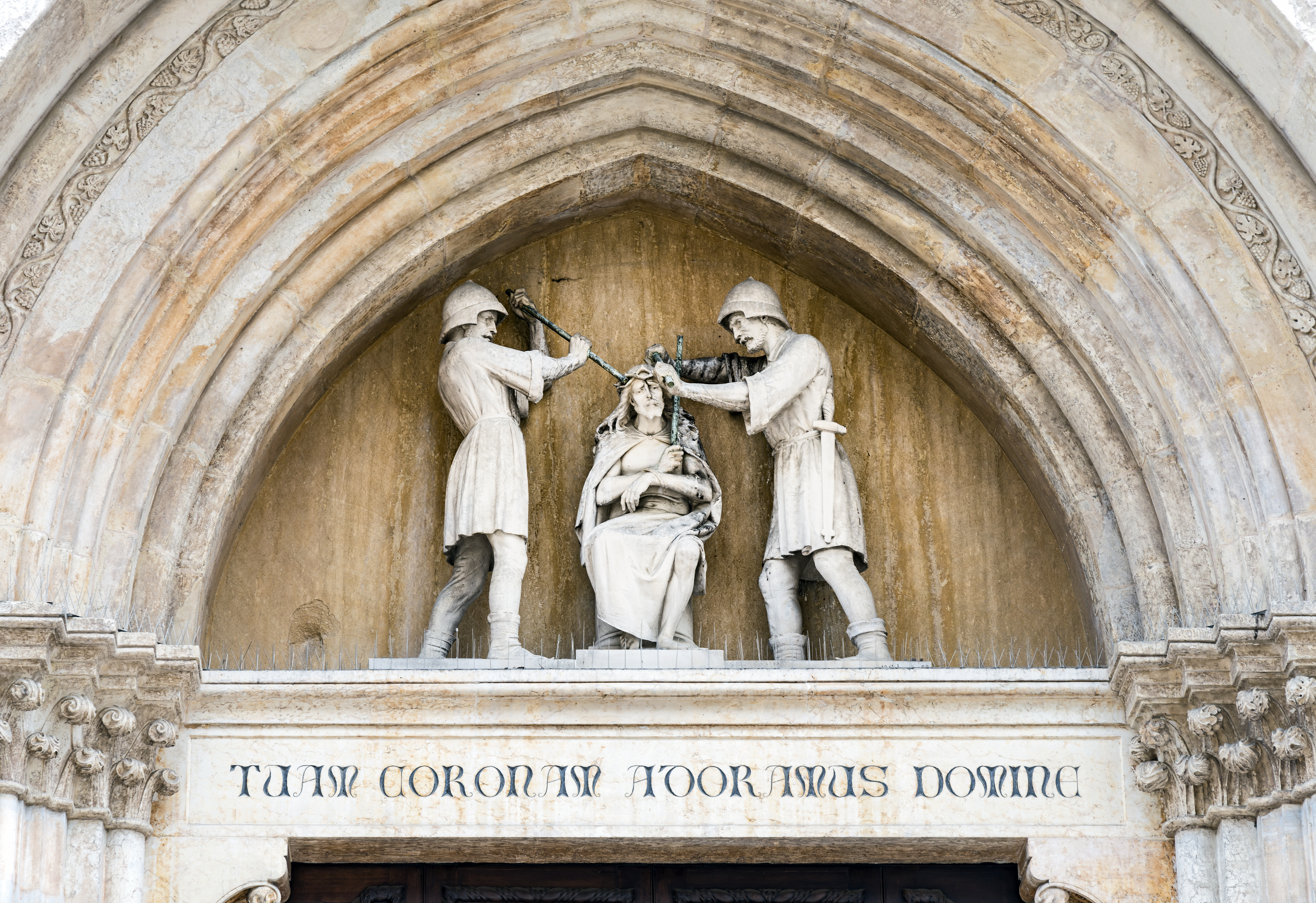
Lunette above the entrance portal (19th-century work)

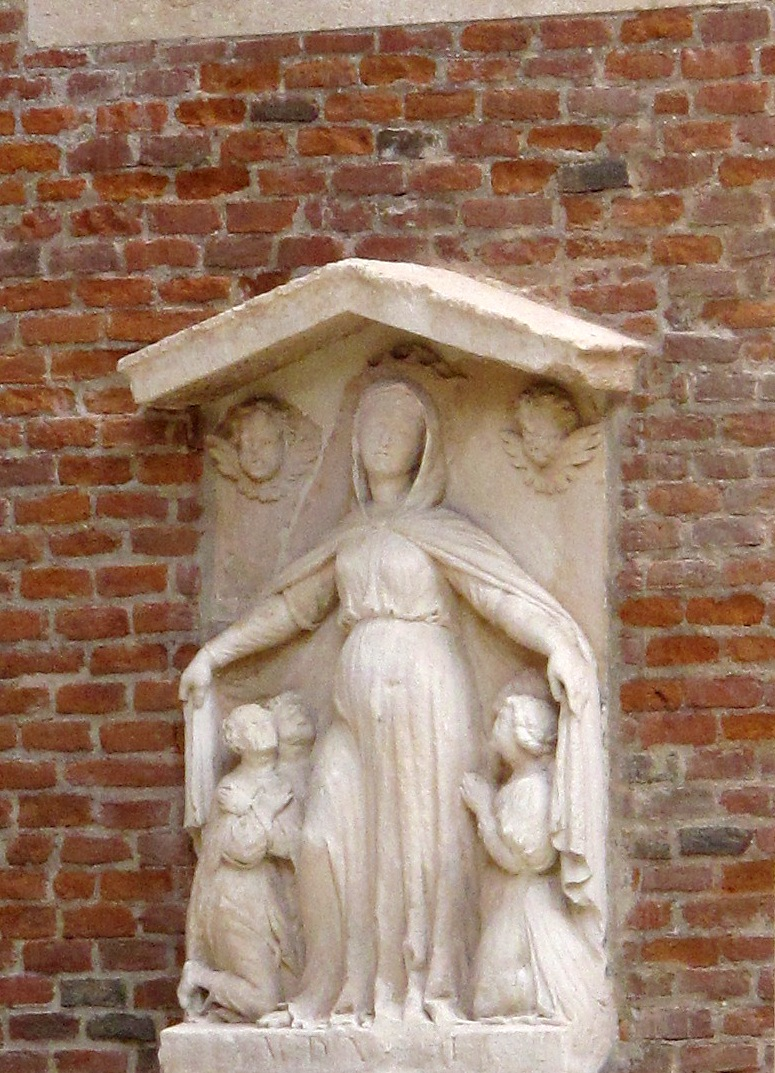
Madonna Protectress

=== Interior ===
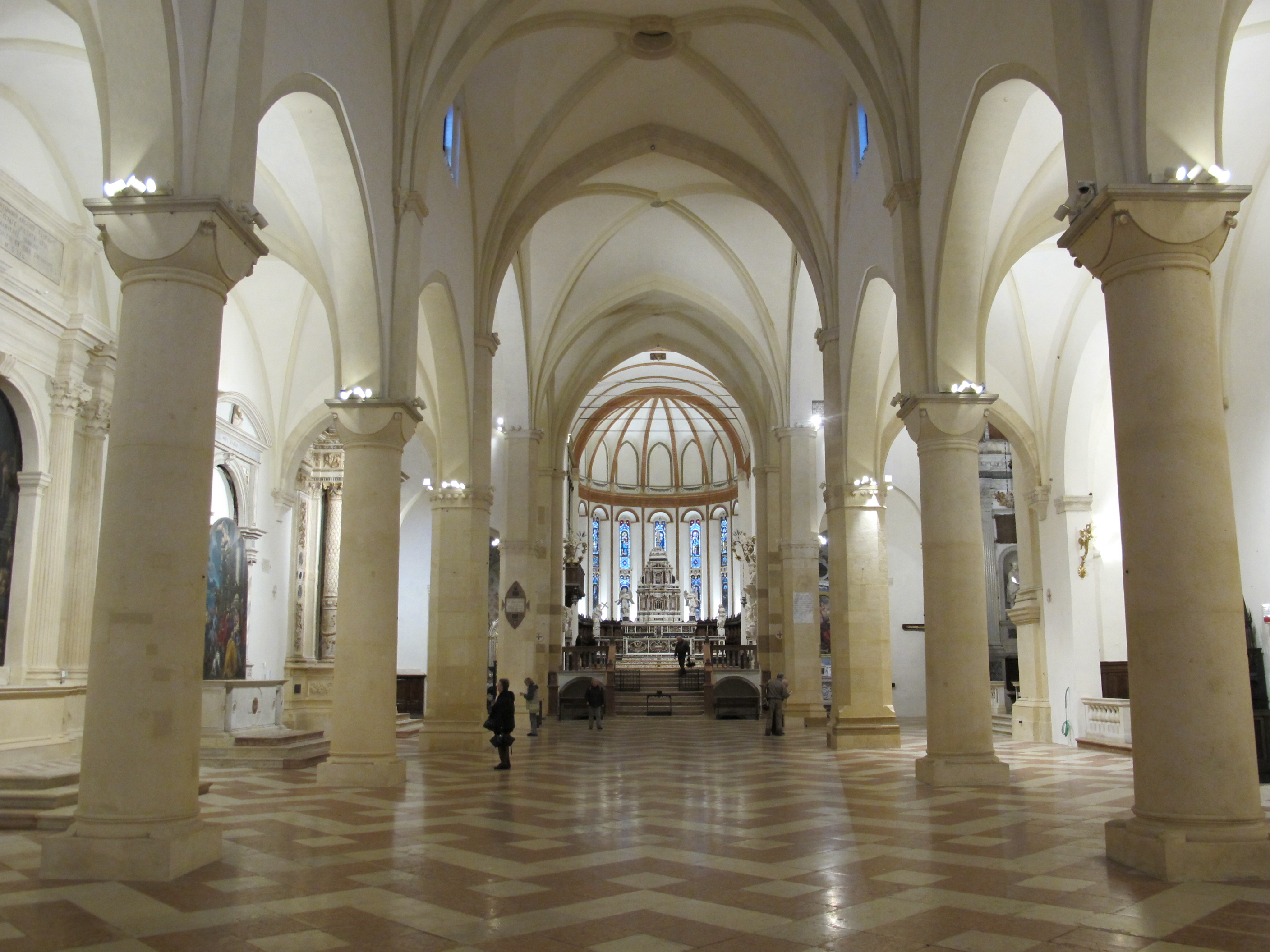
Nave

The interior plan distinctly reflects the layout typical of mendicant orders, derived from Cistercian models. It is a Latin cross with a high transept and divided into three naves; the two lateral naves end in rectangular apses, respectively the Holy Thorn Chapel on the left and the Thiene Chapel on the right, while the central apse ends in the rounded and elongated main chapel, extended in the late 15th century. The first pillars are round with capitals shaped as "cubes," with corners softened by a leaf and characteristic semicircular hanging folds.

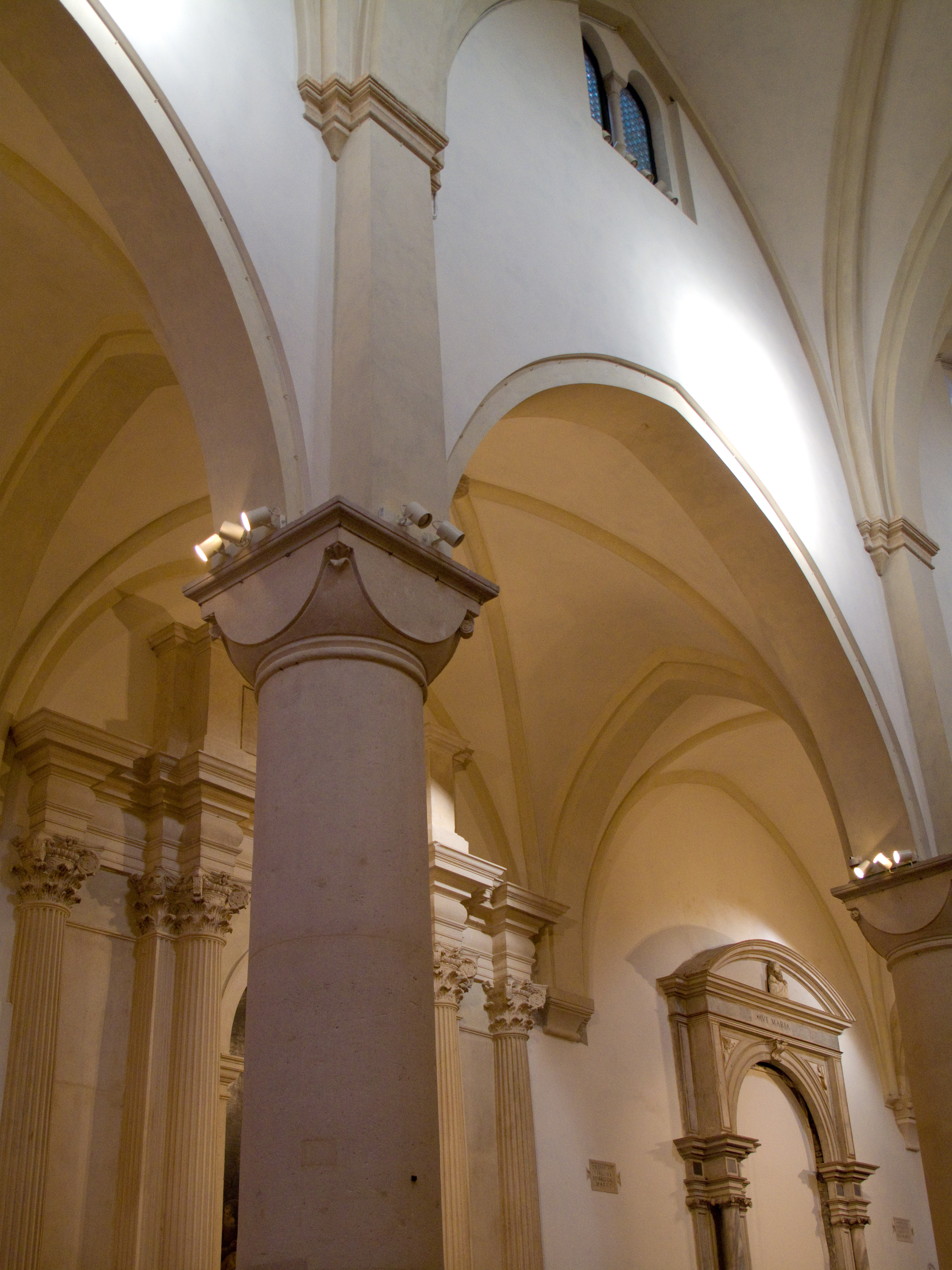
Nave

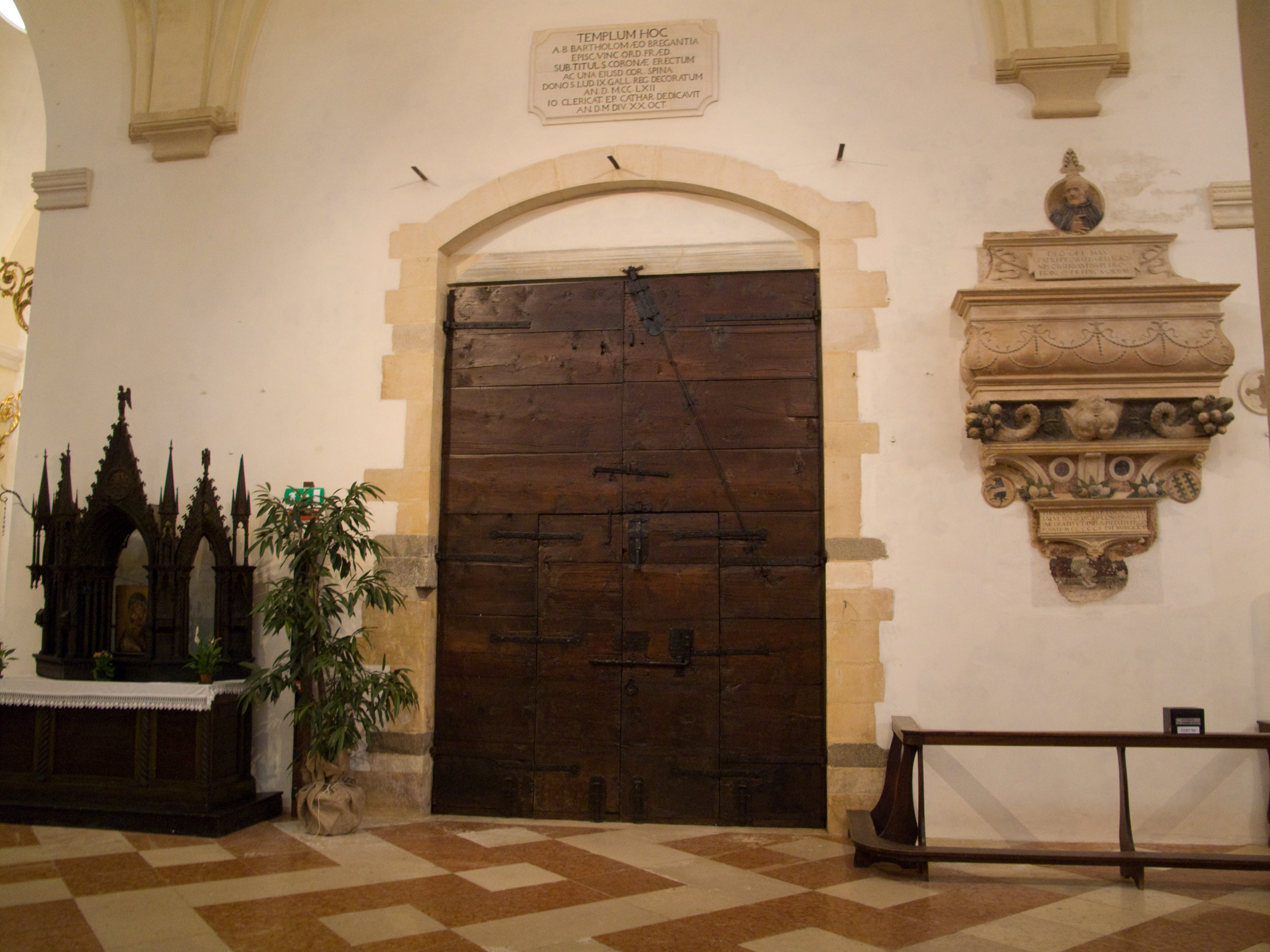
Ancient side door under the right nave

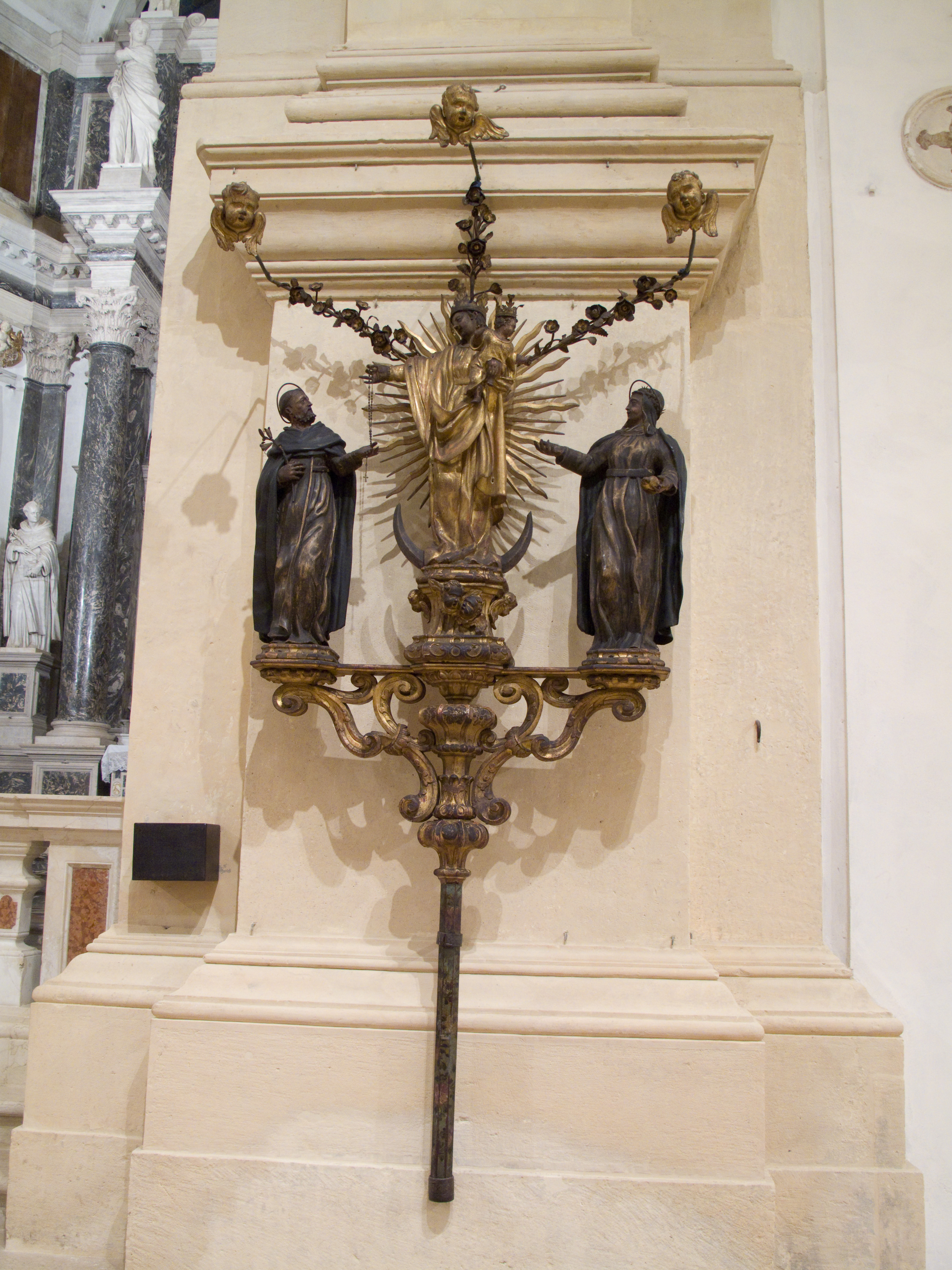
Cross

==== Counterfacade ====
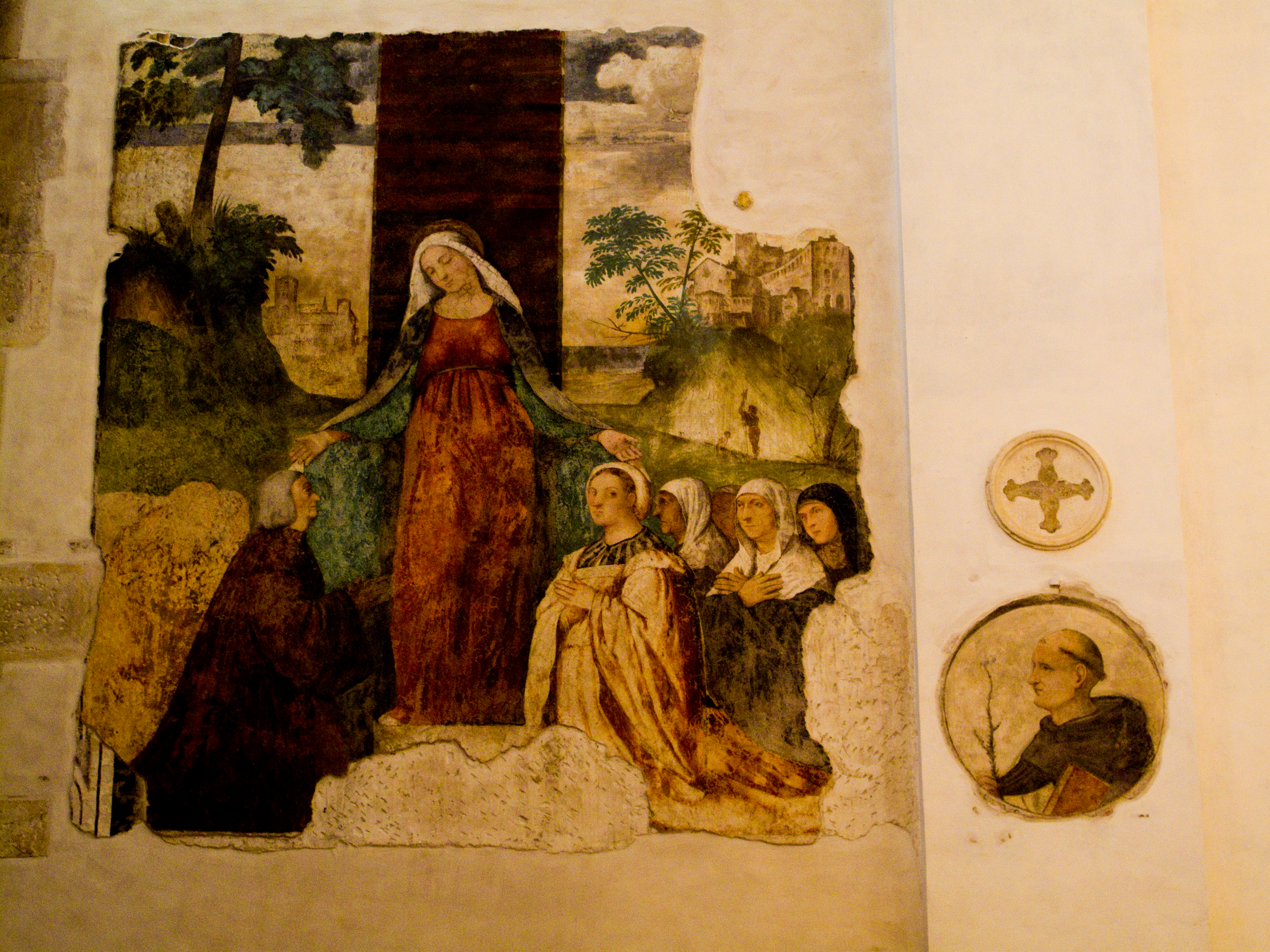
Counterfacade – Madonna of Mercy protecting the faithful of the Turchini Confraternity

On the right, an interesting early 16th century fresco depicts the Madonna of Mercy protecting the faithful of the Turchini Confraternity, attributed to Marcello Fogolino but likely by Alessandro Verla, who also painted the nearby fresco of the Dominican blessed Isnardo da Chiampo. To the left of the door, a funerary urn of Giulia, wife of Simone da Porto, from the same period; above, two large mid-18th century paintings depict the Madonna protecting the members of the Turchini Confraternity—testifying to the persistence of this association three centuries later—and the Killing of Saint Peter Martyr.

==== Crypt and Valmarana Chapel ====
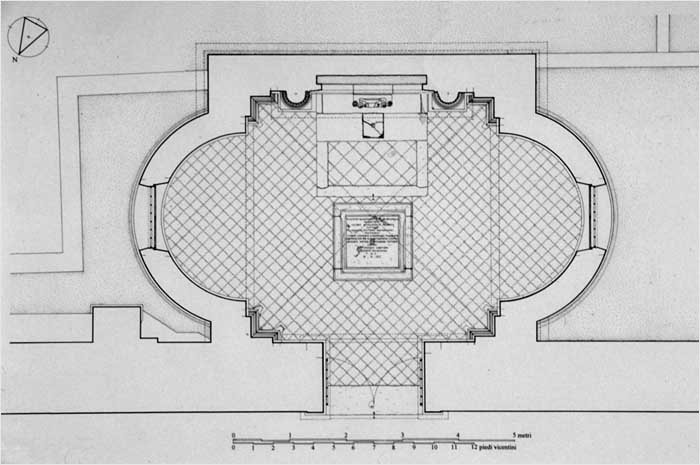
Plan of the Valmarana Chapel (Bouleau 1999)

The crypt was built by Lorenzo da Bologna concurrently with the main chapel above it. It is accessed by descending two narrow staircases located on either side of the presbytery steps; in the left staircase, the tombstone of Andrea Palladio’s family is embedded. The crypt’s low pavilion vault rests on hanging capitals: on four of these—as well as at the center of the vault, painted in gold, red, and blue—is the Valmarana family crest, which funded its construction.

In a second section of the crypt, the ceiling is divided into seven segments with flat ogives resting on hanging capitals. At the far end, a stone frame marks the niche that housed the Holy Thorn reliquary from 1520 to 1850. On the altar are neoclassical stone statues, likely created by Girolamo Pittoni around 1530, depicting the Redeemer at the center, flanked by Saint Louis IX of France and the blessed Bartholomew of Breganze.

For the Valmarana Chapel, despite the extremely limited space, Palladio created a monumental work inspired by Roman funerary monuments, revealing close affinities with the Church of the Redeemer he designed in Venice around the same time. To give the chapel spatial depth, he constructed two tall apses on the sides—featuring four oculi and two large windows—harmonized with the central space by a base band and cornice, above which rises a cross vault.

This results in a sophisticated reference to the tablinum of the ancient Roman house. Around the same time, Palladio designed the side chapels of the Church of the Redeemer in Venice, arranging a sequence of spaces substantially identical to the Valmarana Chapel, as if the Vicentine example were a prototype.

The altarpiece depicts the Apparition of the Madonna to Saint Hyacinth, to whom Leonardo Valmarana dedicated the chapel.

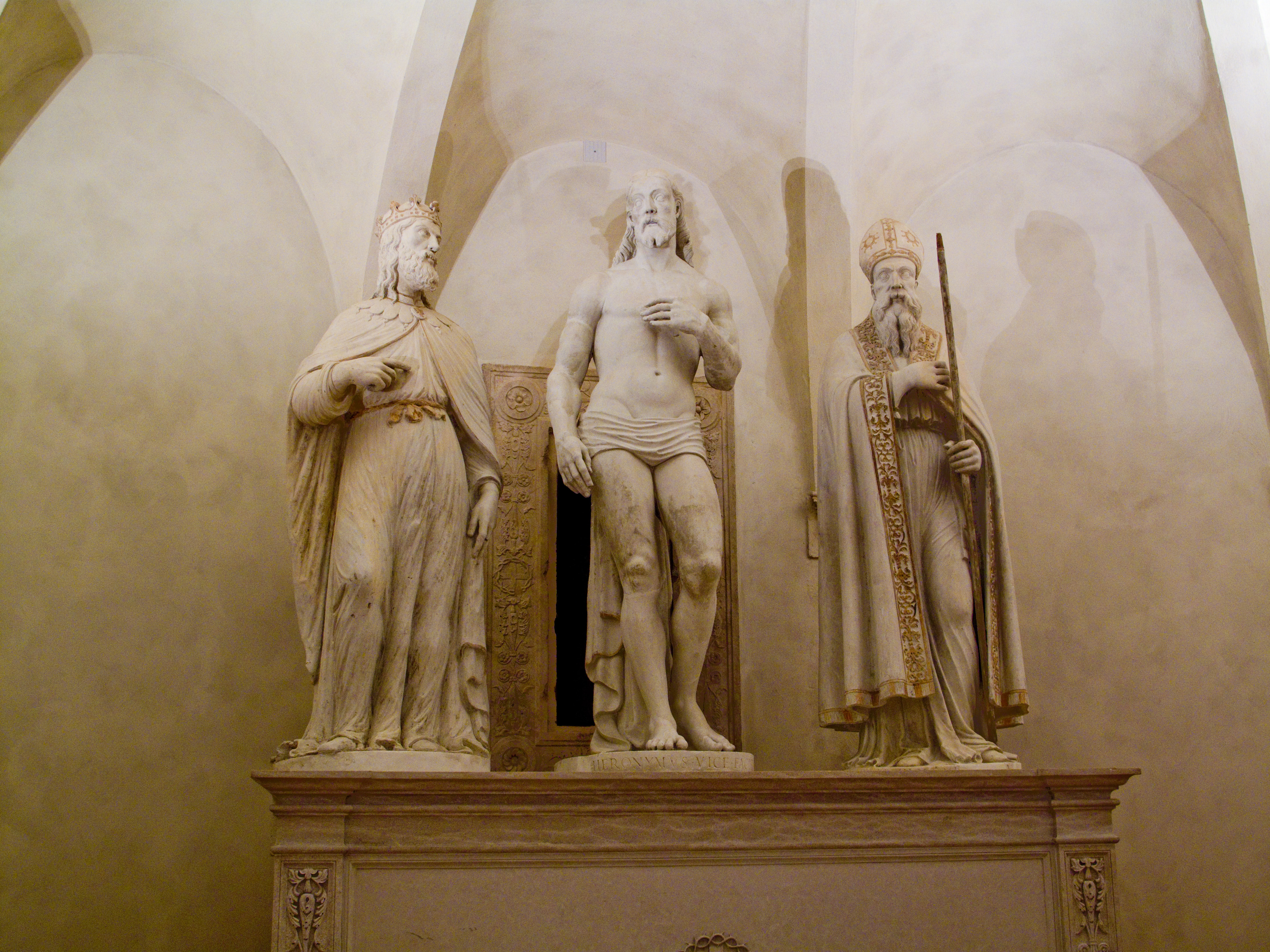
Statues of the Redeemer with Saint Louis and the blessed Bartholomew, in the crypt

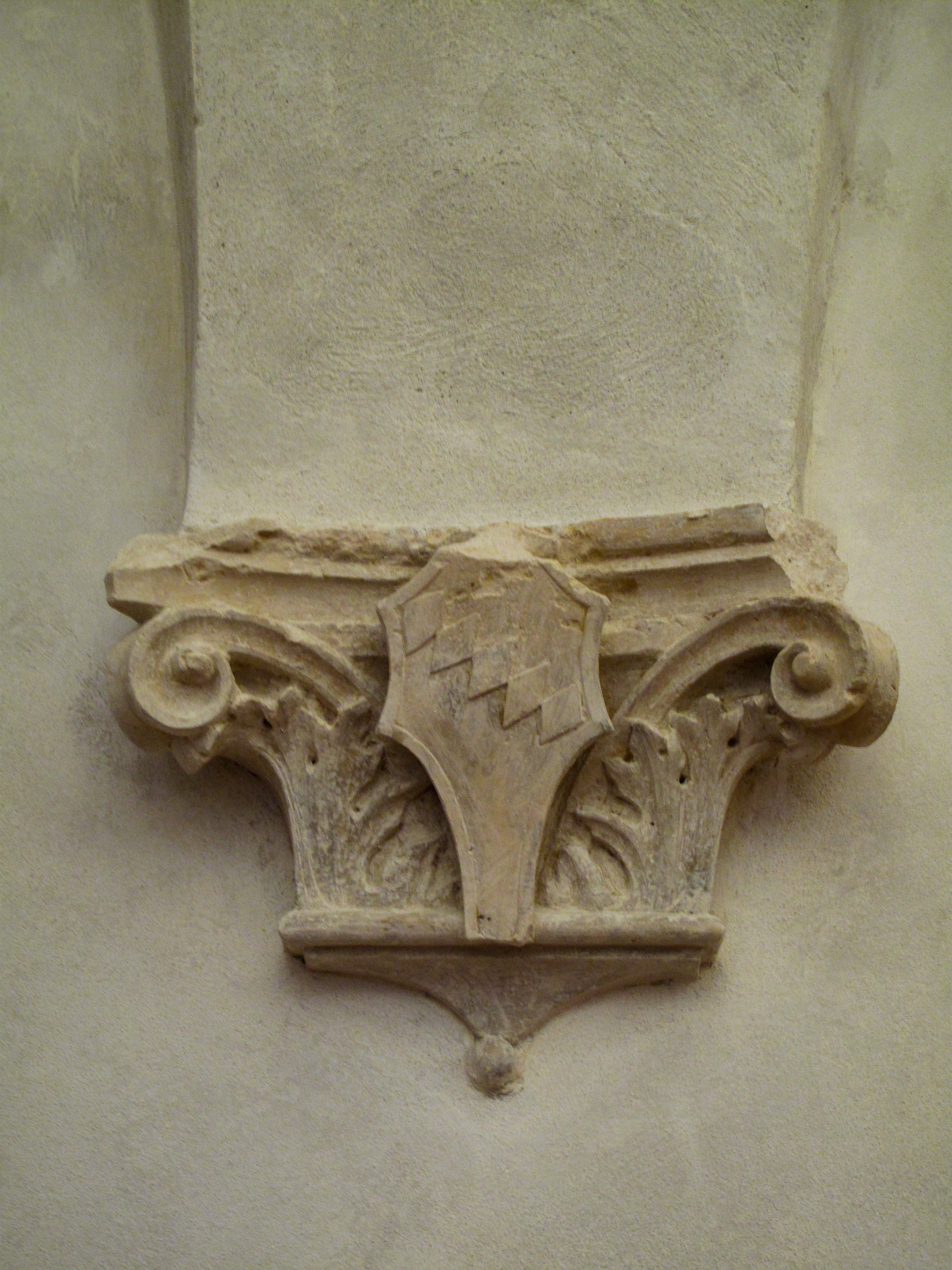
Valmarana family crest in the crypt

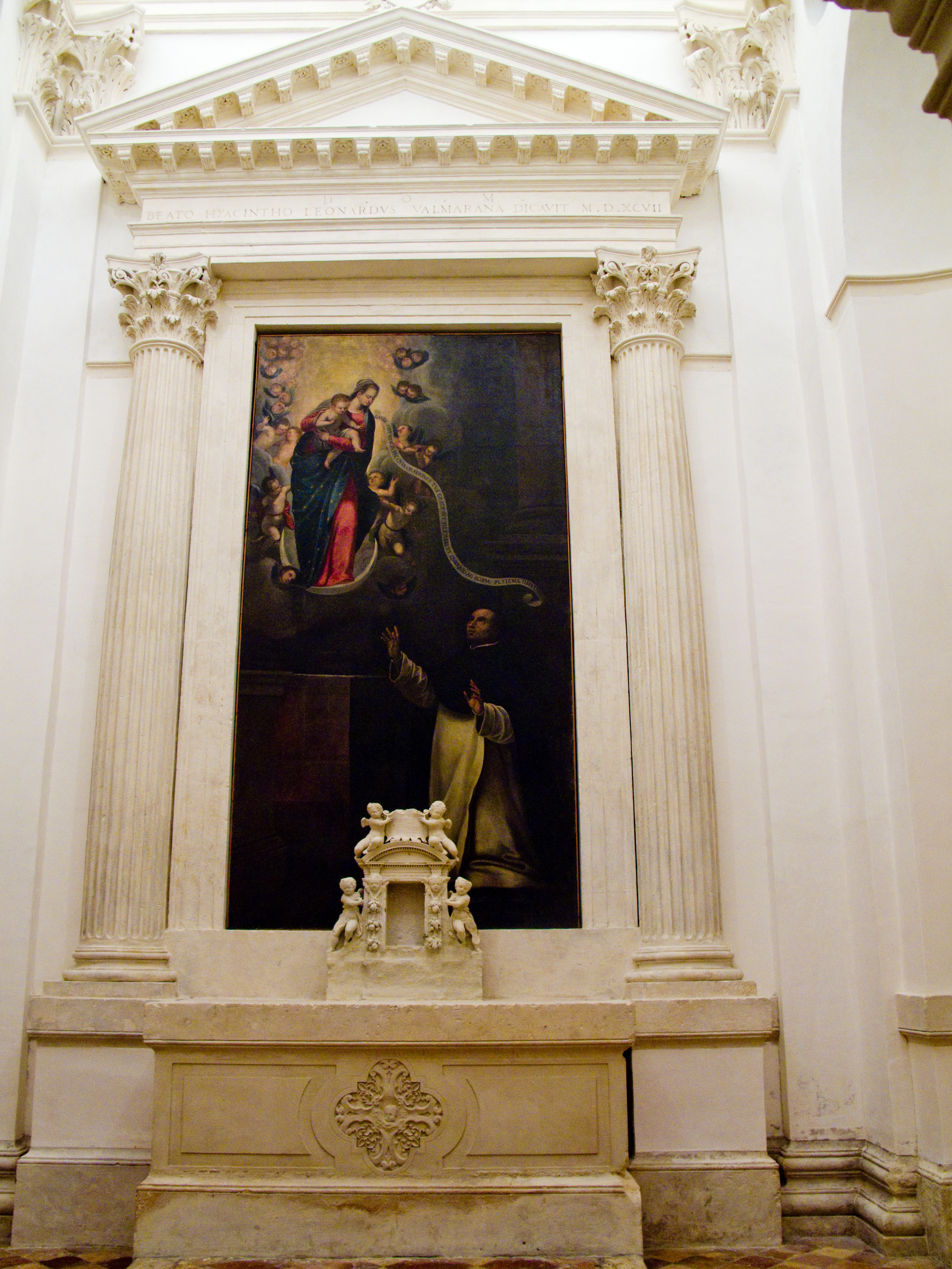
Valmarana Chapel

==== Sarego or San Domenico Chapel ====
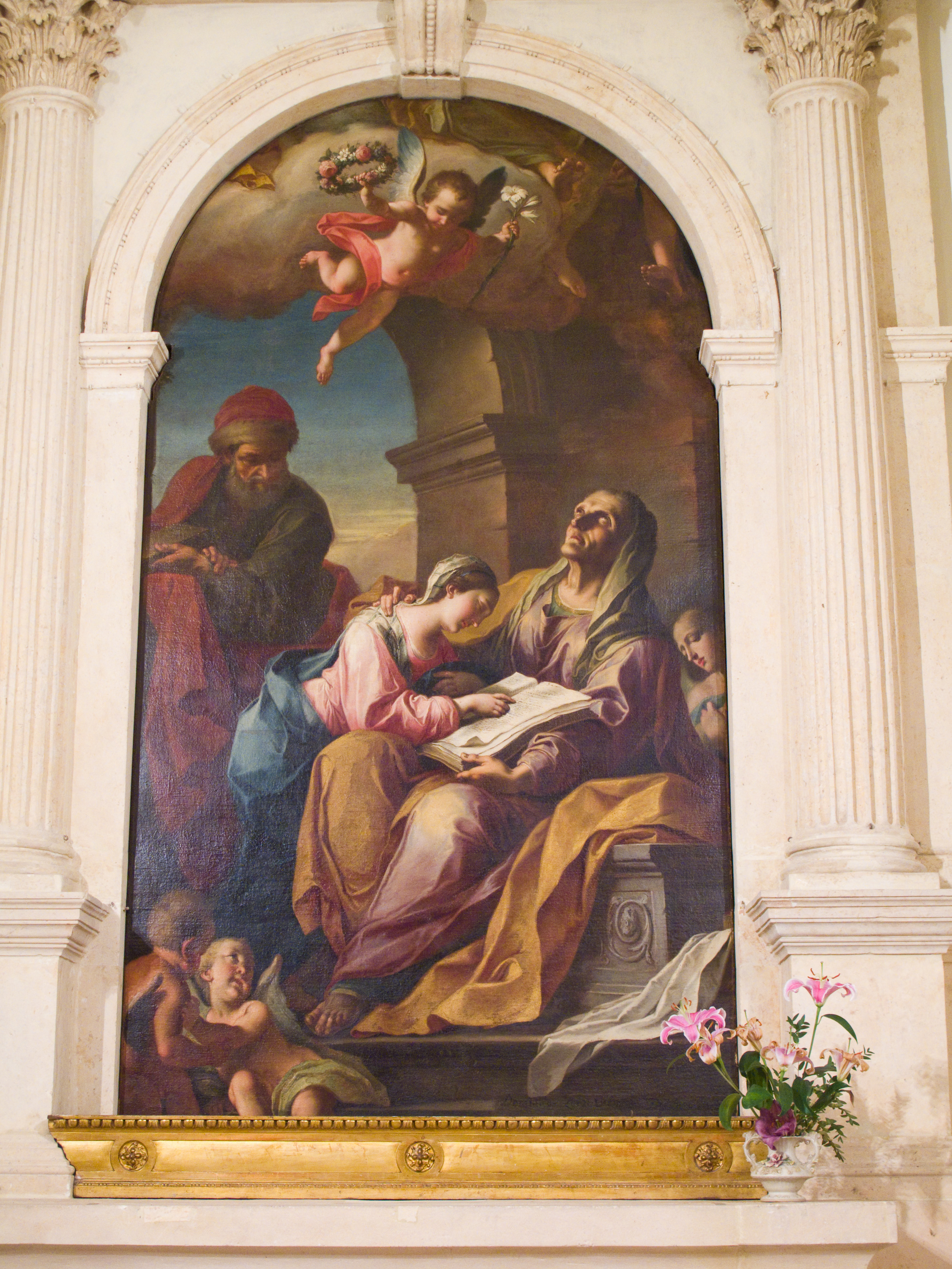
Altarpiece of the San Pietro Chapel – Mary learns to read from Saint Anne

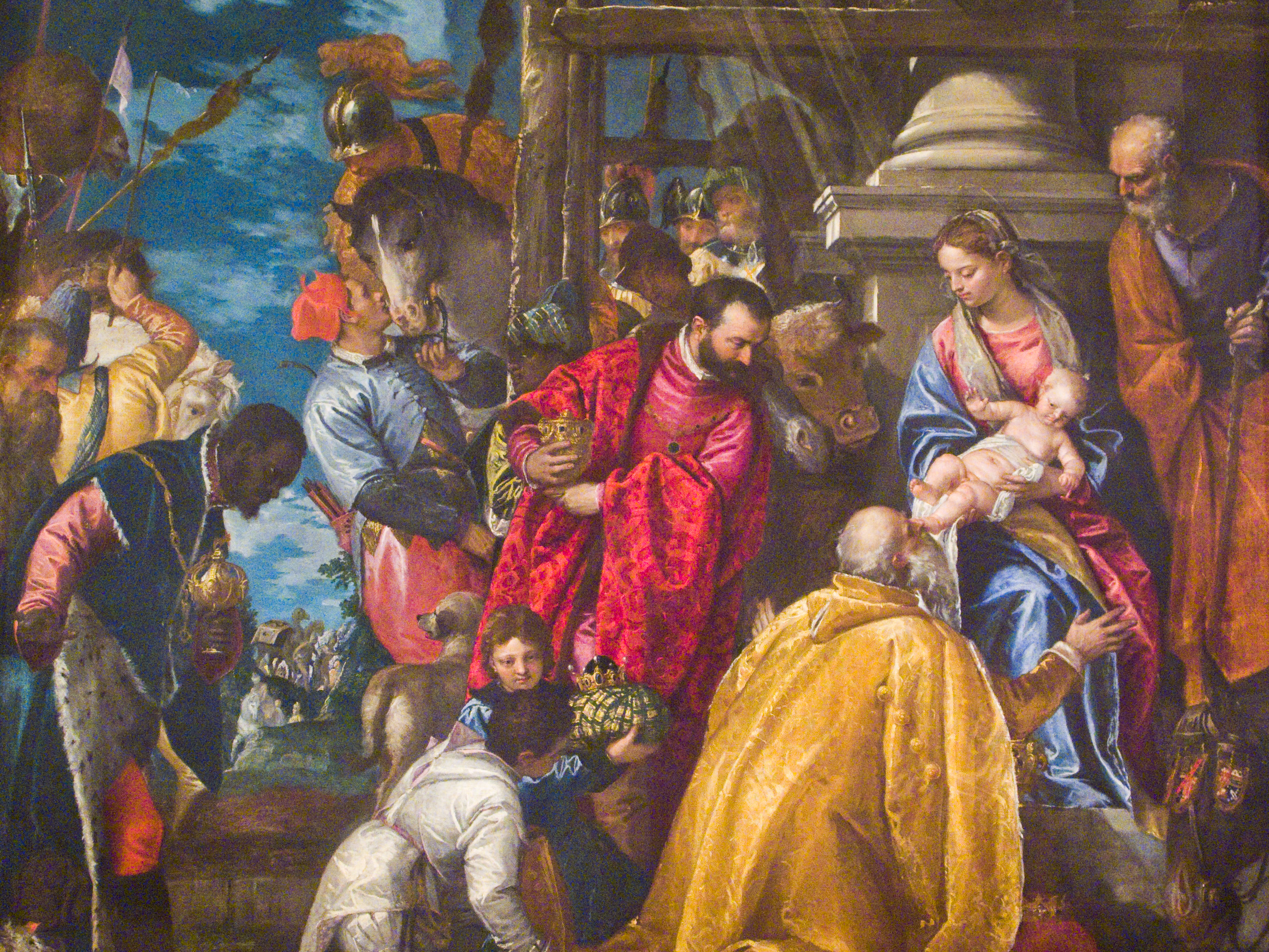
Altarpiece of the San Giuseppe Chapel – The Adoration of the Magi, by Paolo Veronese

The first chapel on the right was built in the first half of the 15th century at the behest of Cortesia da Sarego and later dedicated to Saint Vincent Ferrer, a Spanish Dominican; in the 17th century (1656), it was rededicated to Saint Dominic and filled with works related to this saint and other Dominicans.

Flanking the altar, topped by a modest 17th-century altarpiece depicting the Madonna lifting the image of Saint Dominic, are, on the left, the blessed Isnardo da Chiampo with a crucifix and book and, on the right, a painting possibly attributable to Giovanni Bellini, depicting Giovanni da Schio. On the walls are four paintings attributed to Costantino Pasqualotto, illustrating the Miracles of Saint Dominic.

On the pillar between the first and second chapels is a painting, attributed to Francesco Maffei, notable for its oil-on-stone technique, depicting the Blessed Matteo Carrerio, a preaching friar who built the Dominican convent of Santa Corona.

==== Angaran or San Pietro Chapel ====
Dating to the second half of the 15th century, the second chapel on the right was founded by the Confraternity of Saint Peter Martyr; a century later, it came under the patronage of the Angaran family. The 19th-century altarpiece—transferred there in 1858 from the deconsecrated church of San Faustino—depicts the Child Mary learning to read from Saint Anne, with Saint Joachim present, by the Veronese Domenico Zorzi.

The church door, opening between the second and third chapels and leading to the former friars’ cemetery, now a garden, likely dates to the mid-14th century. Above the door, an inscription commemorates Louis IX of France, who donated the relic of the cross, the blessed Bartholomew of Breganze, the church’s founder, and Bishop Chiericati, who consecrated it in 1504. Flanking the door are two portraits of Dominican popes.

==== San Giuseppe Chapel ====
The chapel—the third on the right—was built in the last decade of the 18th century, after demolishing the wall where the urn containing the remains of the blessed Bartholomew of Breganze was embedded, now in the Holy Thorn Chapel. During the mid-19th century restorations, an altar with fluted columns and a triangular pediment, erected around 1570 by artists from the Pedemuro San Biagio workshop, was placed there, along with the Adoration of the Magi from the mature period of Paolo Veronese, a painting of exceptional quality and great evocative power that significantly influenced the Vicentine artistic environment, particularly the development of Francesco Maffei. The composition, with a vertical orientation, features a caravan in the lower register moving from the left, guiding the viewer’s gaze toward the Holy Family on the right, with the Madonna standing out for her beauty against a towering column. In the upper section, a metaphysical burst of light, a tangible sign of the Epiphany, contrasts with a dark sky streaked with blue. The light, as a protagonist, skillfully highlights the architectural structures and the rich garments of the figures.

==== Chapel of Our Lady of the Rosary ====
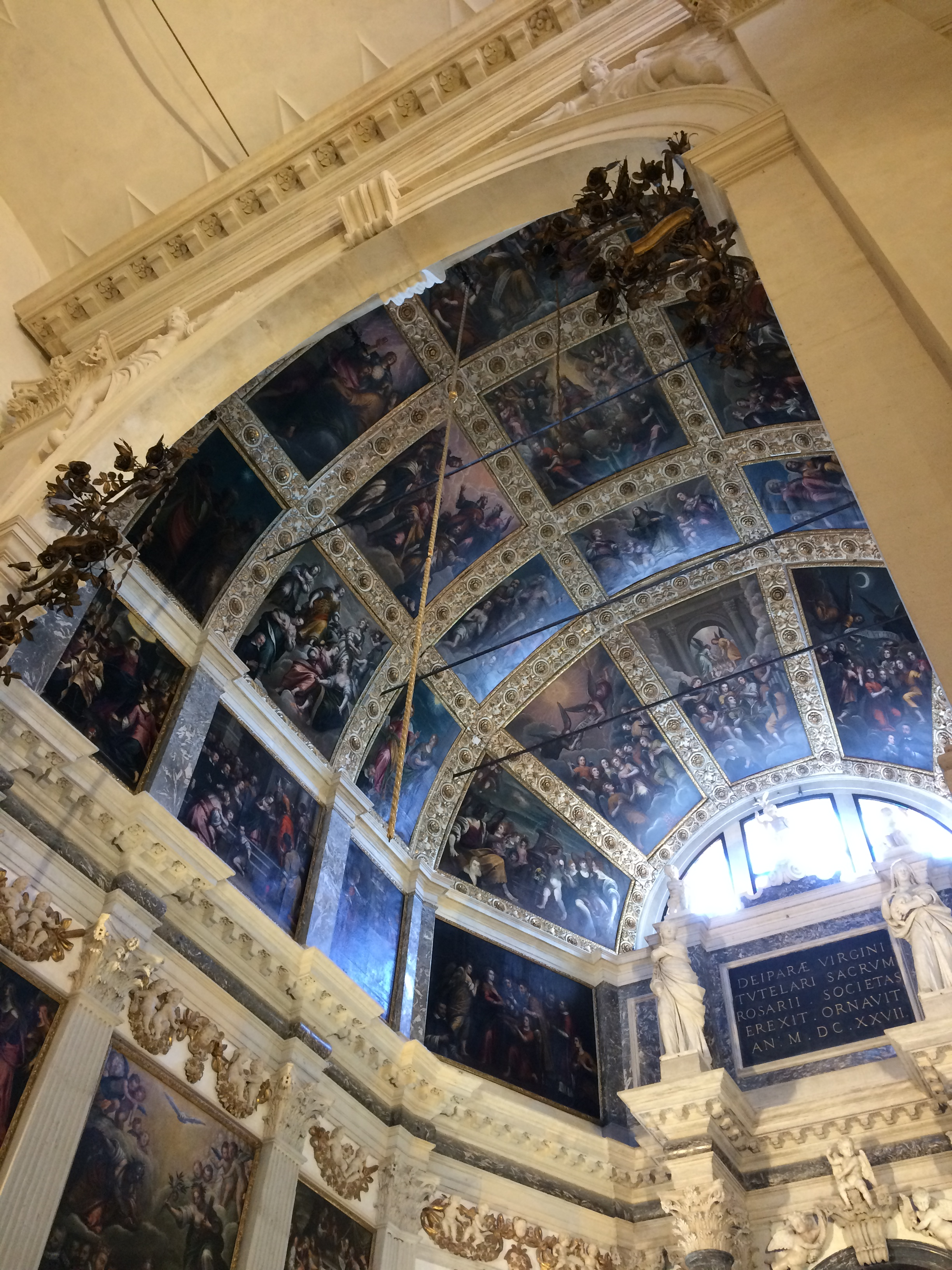
Rosary Chapel, vault

As a thanksgiving for the victory at the Battle of Lepanto, to which Vicenza contributed two ships, the Confraternity of the Rosary erected this large chapel—the fourth on the right—completed in 1619, on the site previously occupied by two smaller 15th-century chapels of the Nievo and Monza families. To add height and integrate the chapel with the church, the right nave’s vault was demolished and replaced with a higher ceiling with a grand scenic effect; the imposing entrance arch to the nave is echoed inside.

Ten years later, a majestic altar of light and gray marble was erected, featuring polychrome statues of Saint Thomas and Saint Catherine of Siena—the patrons of the two previous chapels—flanking the Virgin of the Rosario, from whose starry crown rays of light emanate throughout the niche. In the intrados of the niche, fifteen painted octagons depict the Mysteries of the Rosary. Above the archivolt, three cherubs symbolize the Virginity of Merciful Mary (with the attribute of a cedar), Divine Grace (with a cornucopia), and Prudence (with a mirror and serpent). The two statues on the entablature are allegories of Meekness (holding a lamb) and Temperance (flanked by a camel). Above the attic, three putti symbolize Purity (with a dove), the Holy Spirit (a dove resting with spread wings on its head), and Providence (with a rudder).

On either side of the chapel, four large statues on pedestals, all by Giambattista Albanese or his school, as are those above the altar and the overall architectural structure.

The rich decoration beneath the vault—currently under restoration—is a characteristic example of Marian piety in the religious climate of the Counter-Reformation in Veneto; it includes paintings inspired by the apocryphal gospels and the Song of Songs, mostly created by Alessandro Maganza and his workshop. On the walls are scenes from the life of Mary and the Battle of Lepanto (The League against the Turk by Giambattista Maganza and Triumph of Sebastiano Venier by Alessandro Maganza). The ceiling is divided into four sections by wooden coffers, within which paintings are arranged, often depicting portraits or crests of the Rosary Confraternity’s patrons in the lower parts. In the first section, starting from the back, are the attributes of the Virgin inspired by the Litany of Loreto. In the other sections are Sibyls, Saints, allegories of the Virtues, and Evangelists.

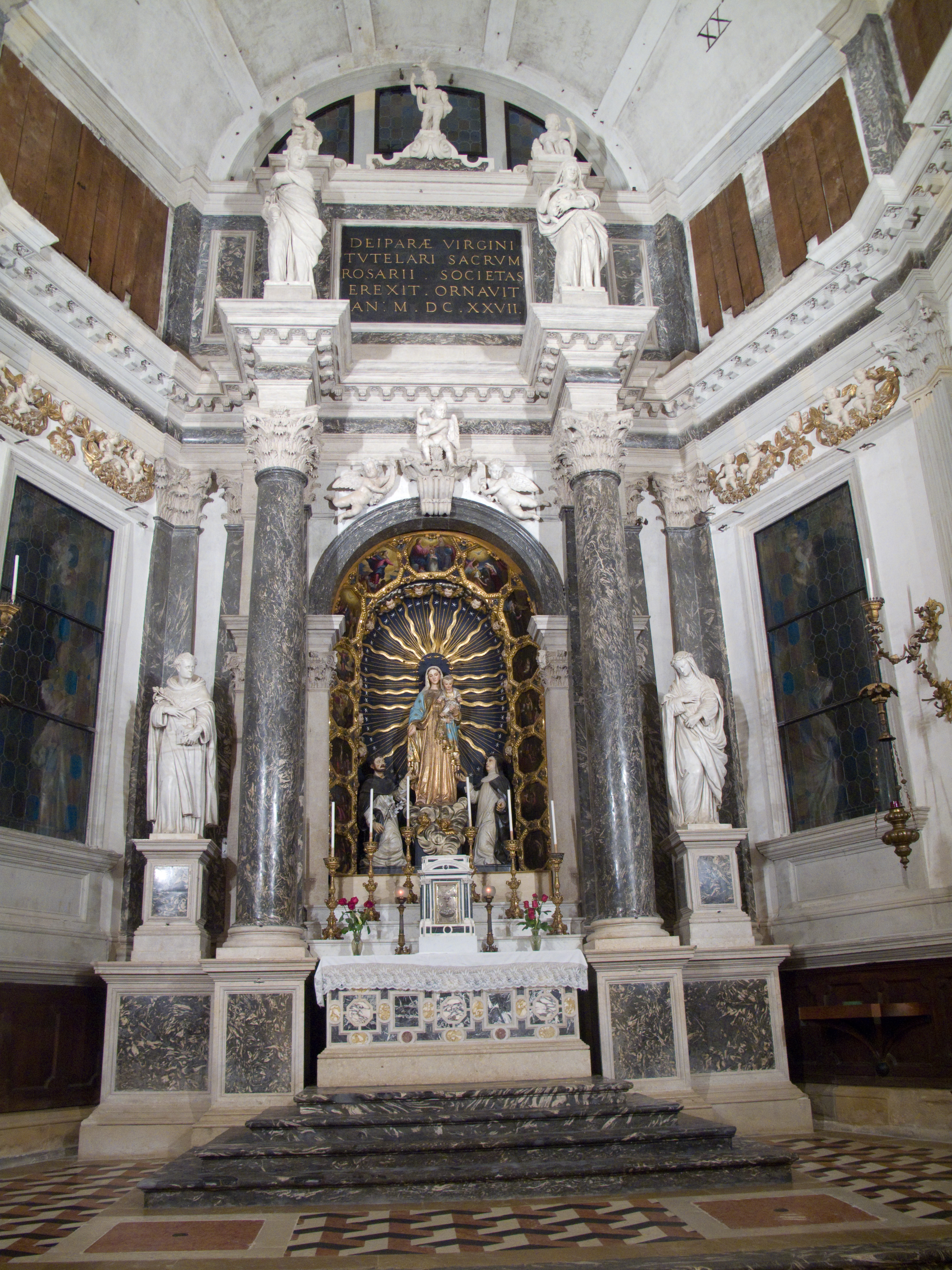
Rosary Chapel, altar

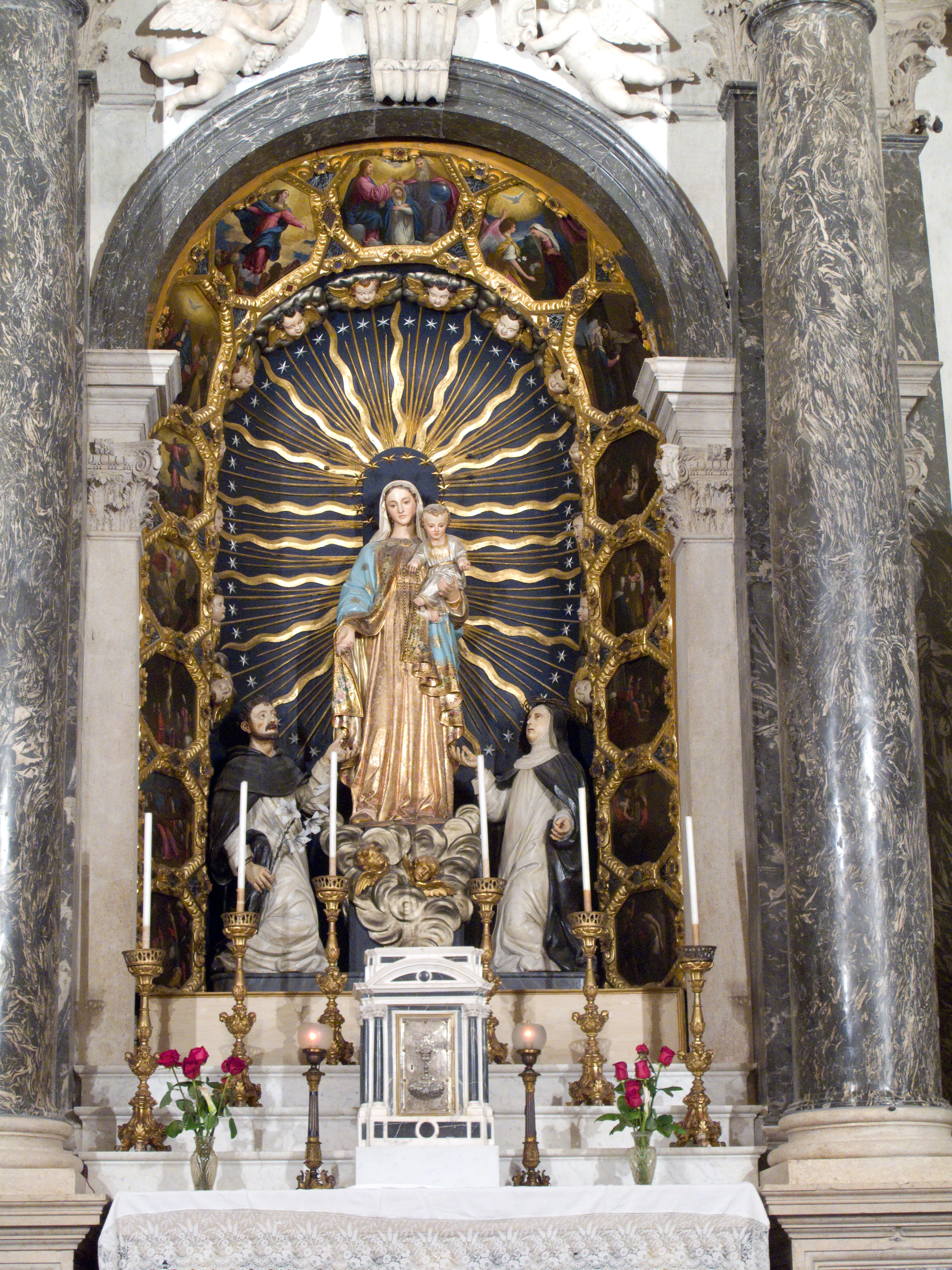
Rosary Chapel, altarpiece

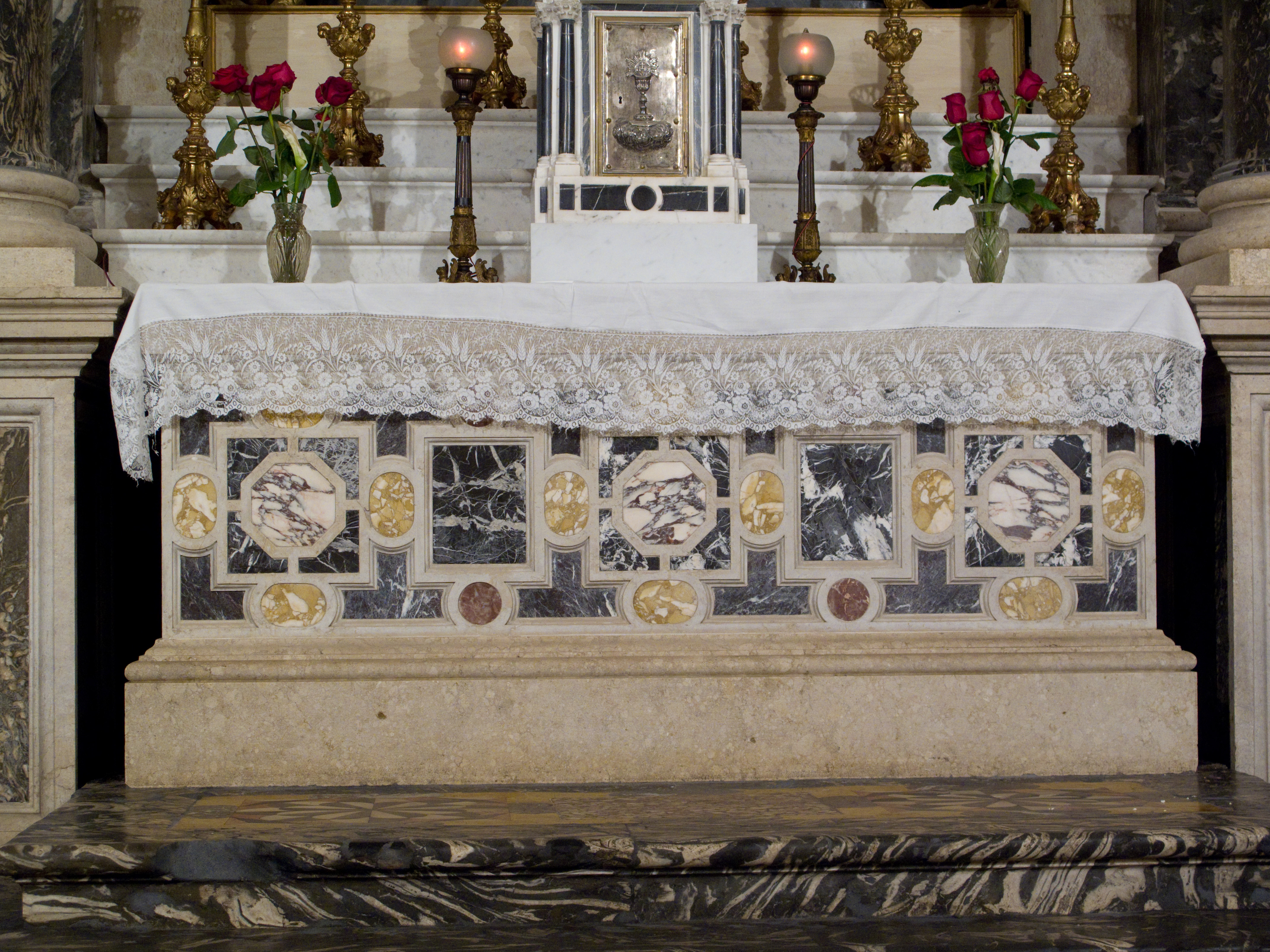
Rosary Chapel, altar frontal

==== Barbarano or San Vincenzo Chapel ====
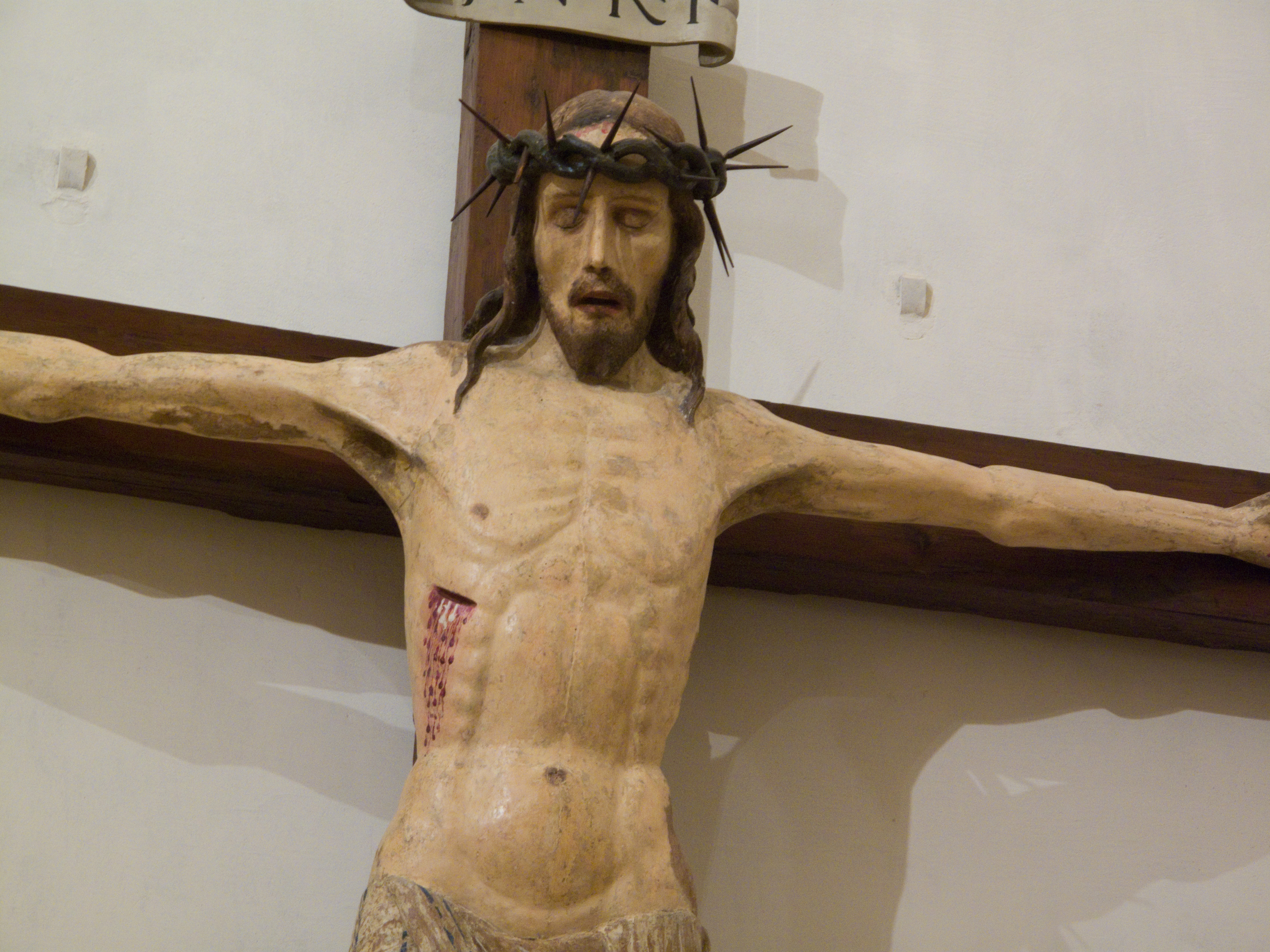
14th-century crucifix in the Barbarano Chapel

The right arm of the transept consists of the chapel commissioned in 1482 by Cristoforo Barbaran to Lorenzo da Bologna, built concurrently with the main chapel and crypt, although only the polygonal apse remains visible externally from the original structure, while the interior was remodeled a century later, likely by Vincenzo Scamozzi or possibly Albanese.

In the 18th century, the original dedication to the Virgin and Saints Vincent and Jerome was changed to Saint Vincent Ferrer, to whom the new altar and its altarpiece were dedicated, depicting the Dominican saint with an apparition of Mary venerated by the two previous saints, likely a work by Antonio De Pieri or his workshop.

On the left wall is a late 13th-century wooden crucifix and the tombstone of Ognibene dei Mironi da Barbaran, from 1298, bearing the family crest. Also on the walls are two 18th-century portraits of Dominican popes.

==== Thiene or Saints Peter and Paul Chapel ====
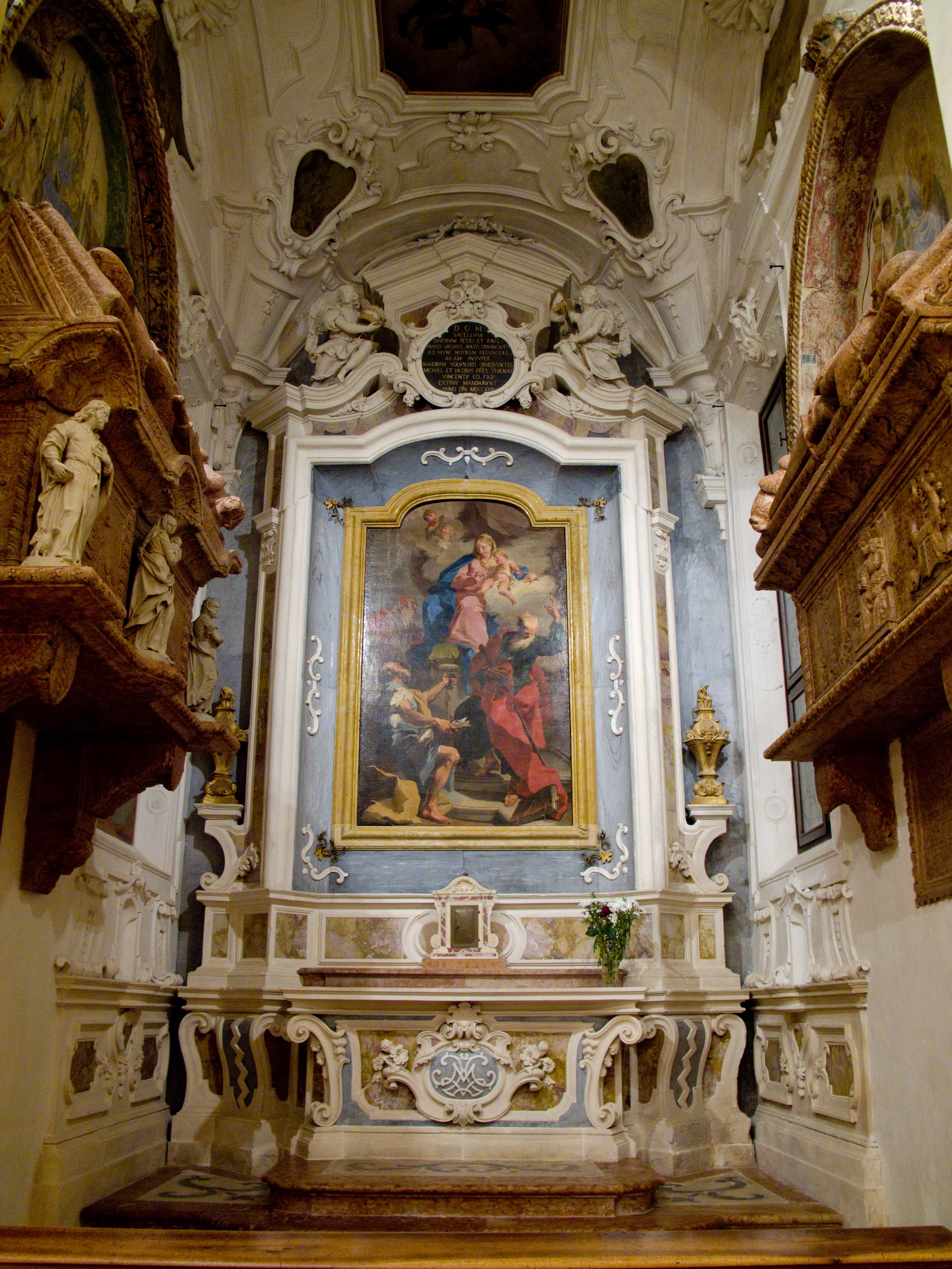
Thiene Chapel – altar

The chapel concludes the right nave, retaining its original 13th-century rectangular plan. Originally in late Gothic style, it was called the golden chapel for its walls painted with saints “mixed with gold” and a blue ceiling studded with stars, illuminated by a large golden ray. It was granted in 1390 to the knight Giovanni Thiene, who was buried in 1415 in the sarcophagus he had prepared, located on the left wall, adorned with three later marble statues. On the right wall is the sarcophagus of the knight Marco Thiene, Giovanni’s great-uncle, decorated with an image of the Madonna and Child. The two sarcophagi are among the most significant works of Venetian sculpture from the late 14th to early 15th centuries. The deceased are depicted lying with hands clasped, fully dressed in armor with a sword at their side; at their feet lies a dog, a symbol of loyalty. The sarcophagi feature bas-relief images of helmets and crests on the front. Above the sarcophagi are two flamboyant Gothic lunettes, frescoed inside. In the frescoes, the two knights are depicted symmetrically, kneeling, presented by a saint to the Madonna enthroned with the Child, accompanied by other saints, likely works by the Lombard painter Michelino da Besozzo.

The entire chapel was renovated in the early 18th century due to its poor condition, redecorated in the Rococo style under the supervision of Francesco Muttoni. A new altar was installed, featuring an altarpiece of the Madonna enthroned with the Child venerated by Saint Peter and Saint Paul, with Saint Paul visually recalling Pope Pius V, the proponent of the Holy League that led to the Battle of Lepanto, a work by Giambattista Pittoni.

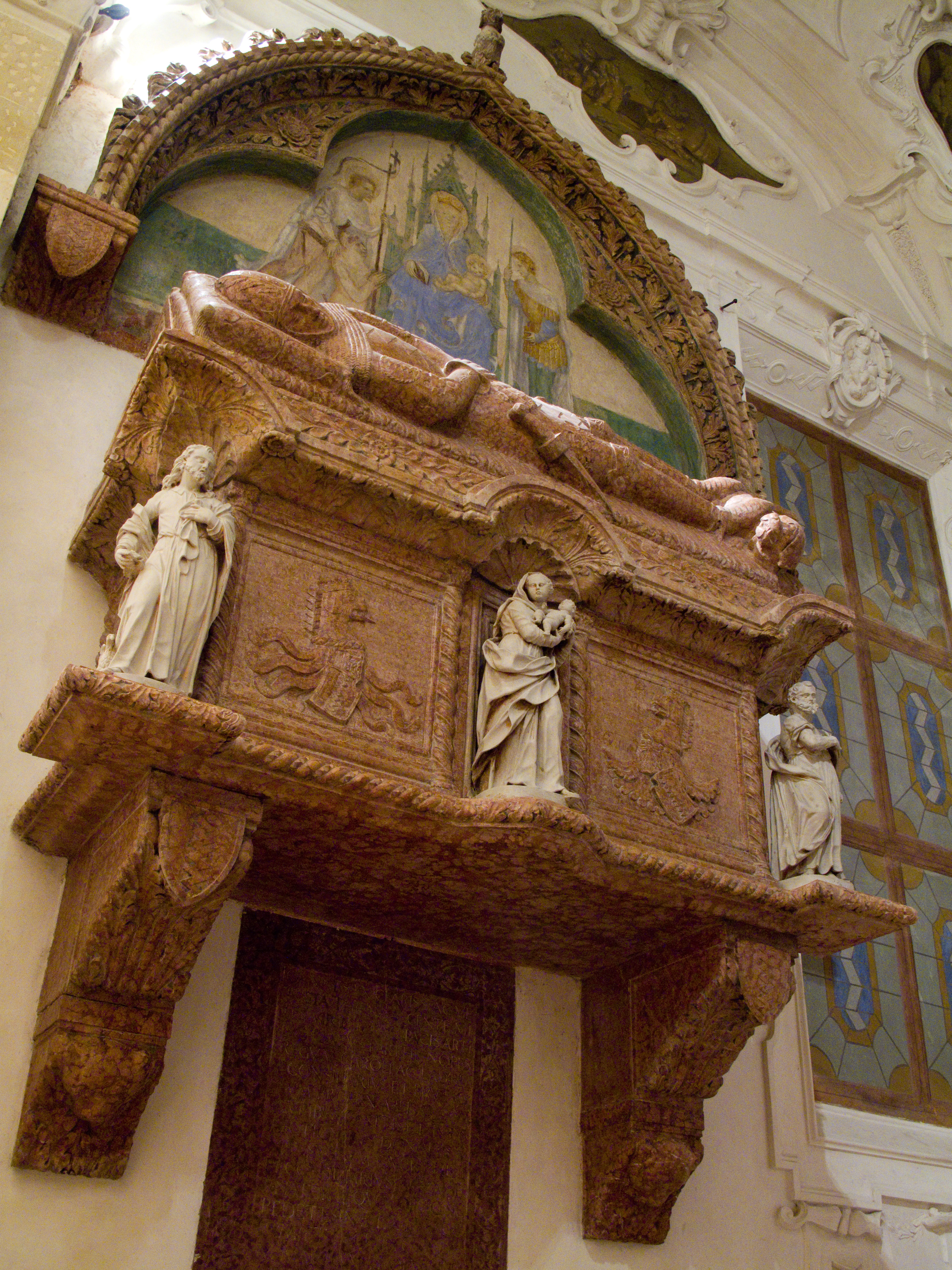
Sarcophagus of Giovanni Thiene

==== Main chapel and presbytery ====
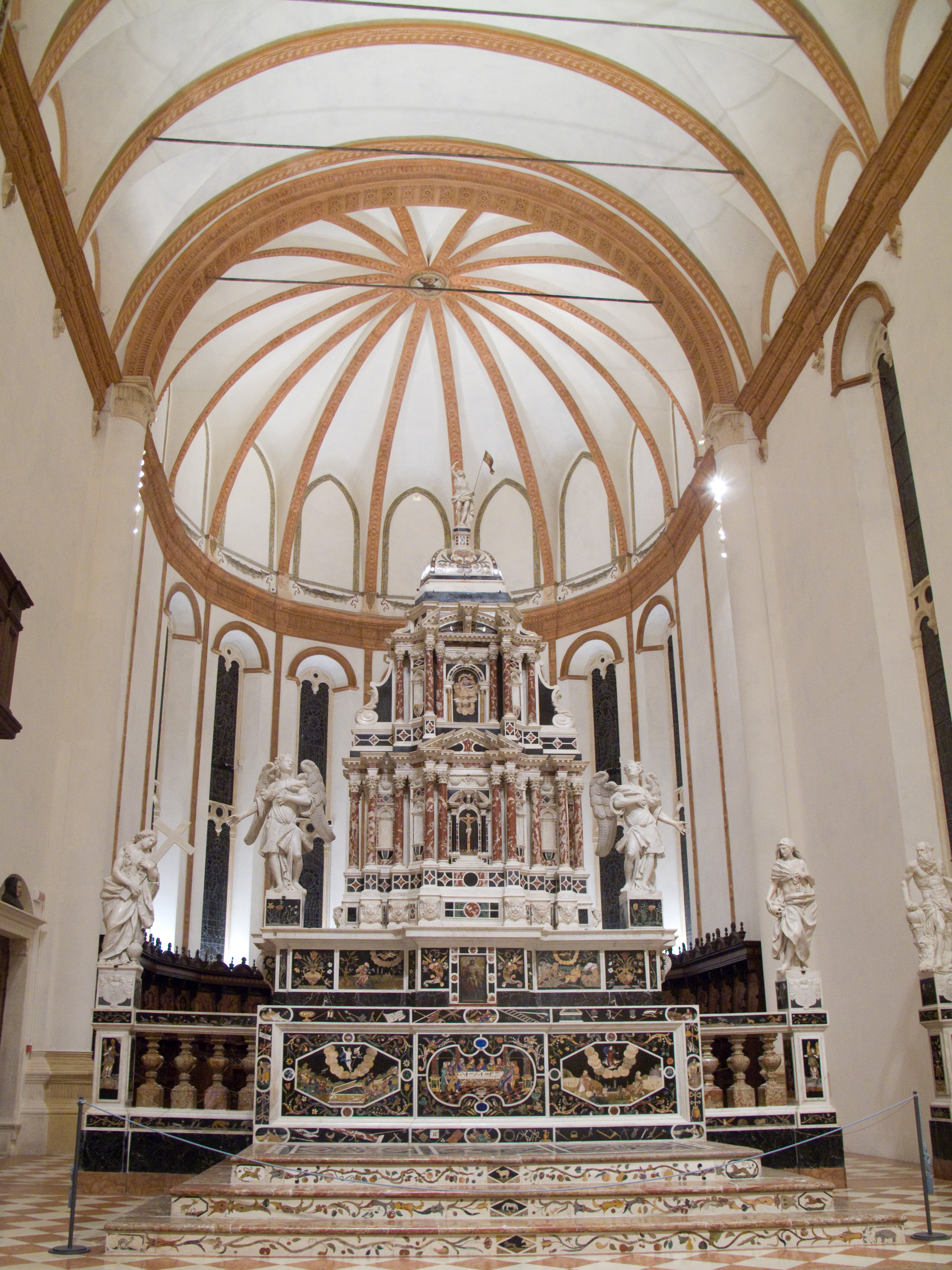
Main Chapel and central altar

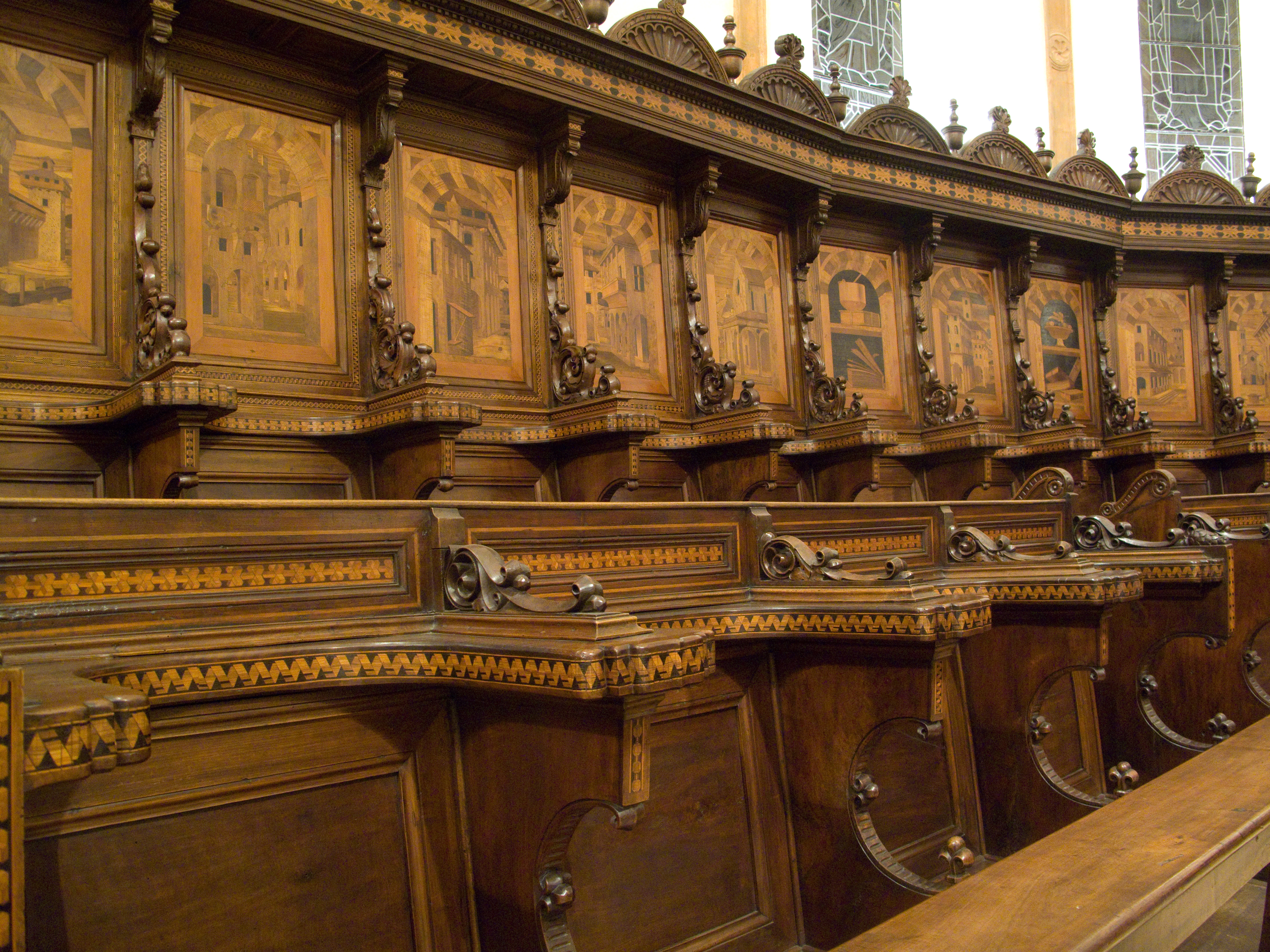
Choir in the main chapel

After demolishing the back wall of the main nave, work began in 1478 to construct the presbytery and apse of the main chapel—granted in patronage to the Sesso family and designed by Lorenzo da Bologna—completed with the chapel’s consecration in 1504.

The chapel, accessed via a wide staircase with alternating white and red marble steps, consists of two sections: the first is the rectangular presbytery, introduced by an arch clad in terracotta panels and covered by a barrel vault; the second, the choir, accessed through a second arch, is a seven-sided polygonal apse. The two sections are connected by a high terracotta cornice; on the sides, several sarcophagi contain the remains of Sesso family members, whose coat of arms appears throughout the chapel. Typical of Vicentine churches is the floor of white and red stone squares.

Along the perimeter of the apse, the wooden choir, inlaid with views of buildings and still lifes, is attributed to Pier Antonio degli Abbati from Modena, funded by Palmerio Sesso and built at the end of the 15th century, with a bench and lectern from 1544. It consists of 51 stalls arranged in two rows, with inlaid wooden panels in the backrests showcasing the artist’s skill in using the colors of the wood, along with great expertise in perspective rendering.

Attached to the left wall is an organ built in 1854–56 by the craftsman Giovan Battista De Lorenzi, notable for its rare “fonocromico” key-pipe transmission system invented by him in 1851.

The altar, from 1667–69, is the work of inlayers in precious stones, the Florentine Corbarelli, who also built the small temple above the altar in 1670–71. The grandiose complex stands isolated on three steps, adorned with inlays and geometric and floral motifs. The small temple rises from a base decorated with cherubim and consists of two orders of red marble Corinthian columns. The dome is topped by an image of the Redeemer. On the lower tabernacle door is painted the Resurrection; on the rear tabernacle door, the Christ dead with the Sorrowful Virgin, Saint John the Evangelist, and the Eternal Father to whom an angel offers the chalice. Flanking the doors are cornucopias. The apse’s stained glass windows, from Munich, date to the late 19th century.

Every surface of the altar is adorned with polychrome inlays of precious marbles, lapis lazuli, corals, carnelians, and mother-of-pearl. The frames feature small animals, flowers, cherubs, objects related to the Passion, as well as houses, cottages, churches, and small landscapes.

On the antependium of the main altar are depicted, from the left: the Resurrection, the Last Supper, the Apparition of the Madonna to Saint Vincent and Vincenza Pasini on Monte Berico (with a panorama of Vicenza in the background). On the left side decoration, the Virgin offers the Child for adoration to the blessed Margaret of Hungary and Christ appearing to the same; on the right side, the Apparition of the Virgin to Saint Catherine of Siena and The same saint receiving the stigmata. The rear table’s altar frontal shows the Crowning with Thorns at the center, flanked by the Donation of the Holy Thorn by Louis IX King of France to Bishop Bartholomew of Breganze and the Entry of Bishop Bartholomew into Vicenza. On the left side decoration, the Killing of Saint Peter Martyr, and on the right, Saint Dominic with another Dominican friar retrieving the Bible unharmed from the flames.

On the pillars of the entrance arch to the Main Chapel are two paintings by Battista da Vicenza in gilded neo-Gothic frames, depicting Saint Sebastian and Saint Martin.

In front of the altar are two balustrades with musical angels on the front faces and the Cardinal Virtues on the rear (from left: Strength, Prudence, Justice, Temperance).

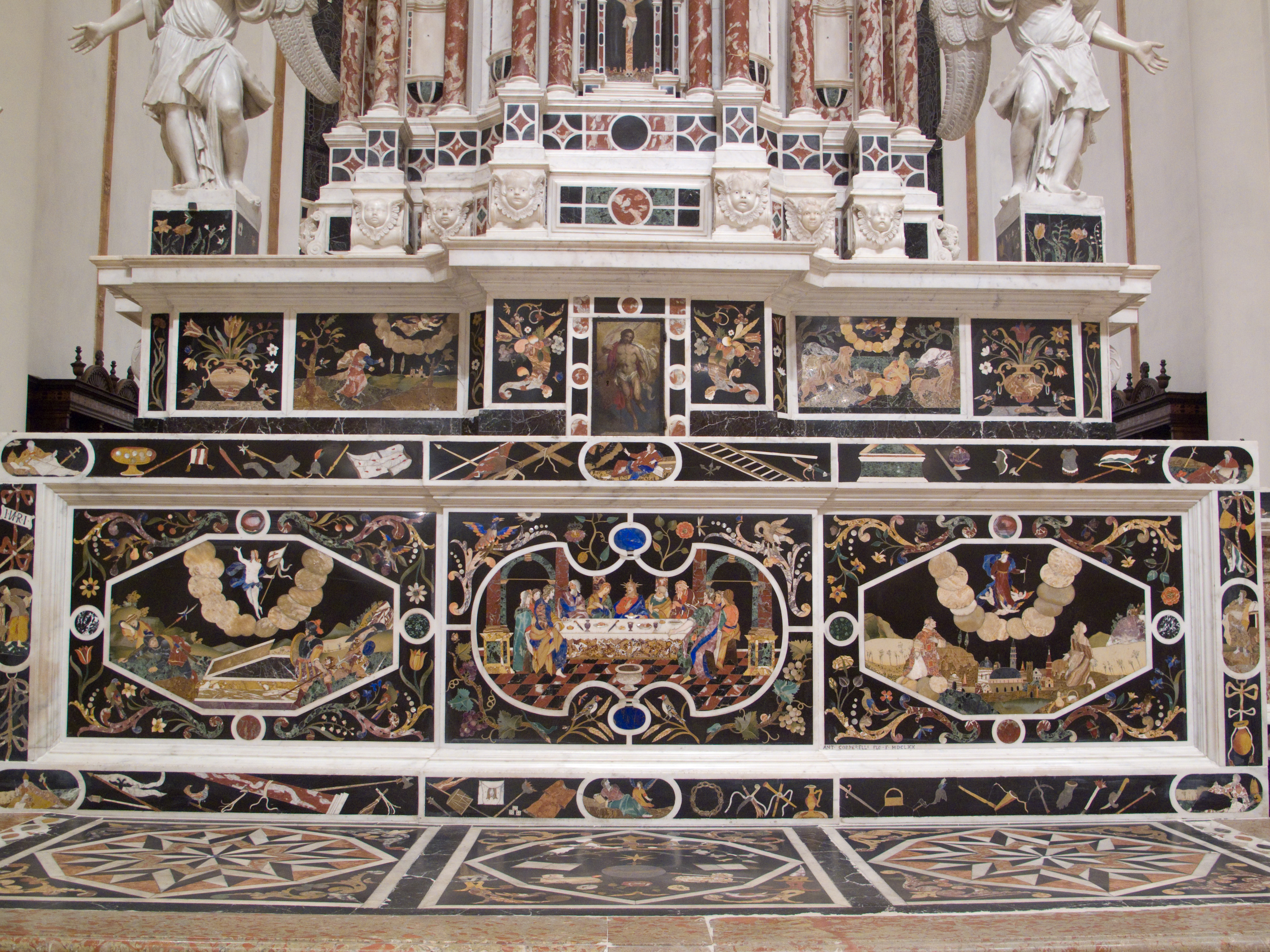
Altar frontal of the central altar

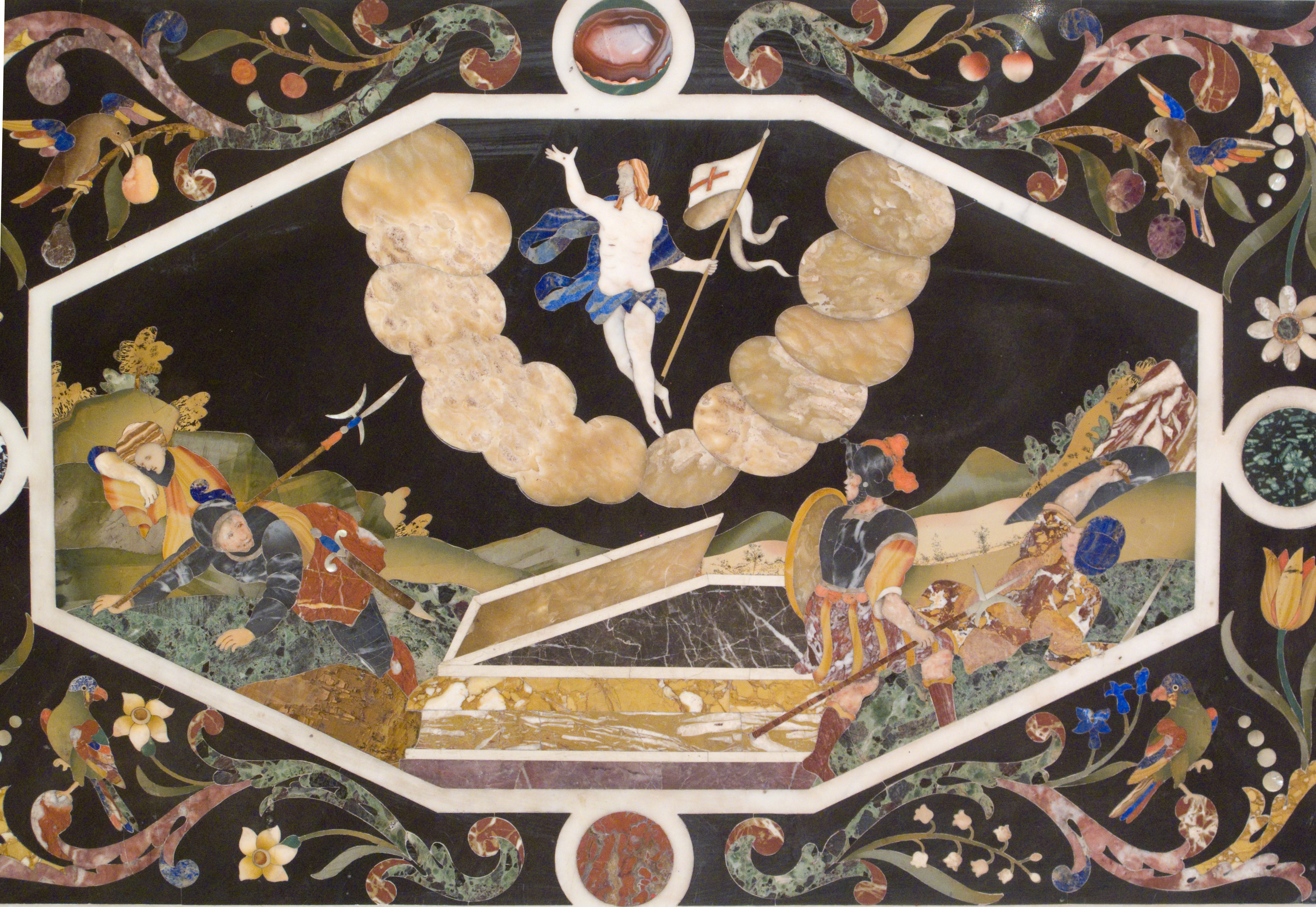
Altar frontal of the central altar: The Resurrection

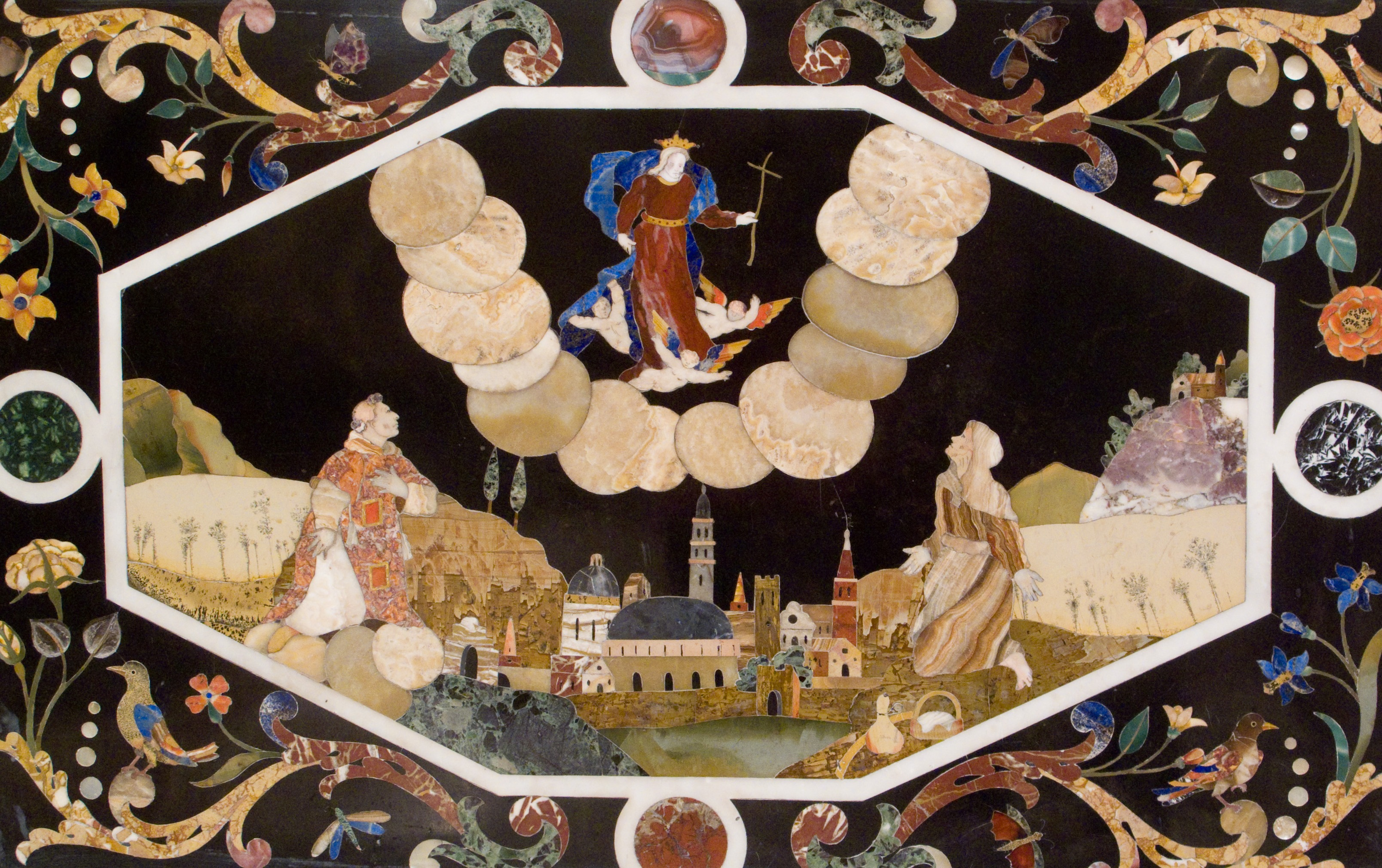
Altar frontal of the central altar: The Madonna of Monte Berico appears to Vincenza Pasini

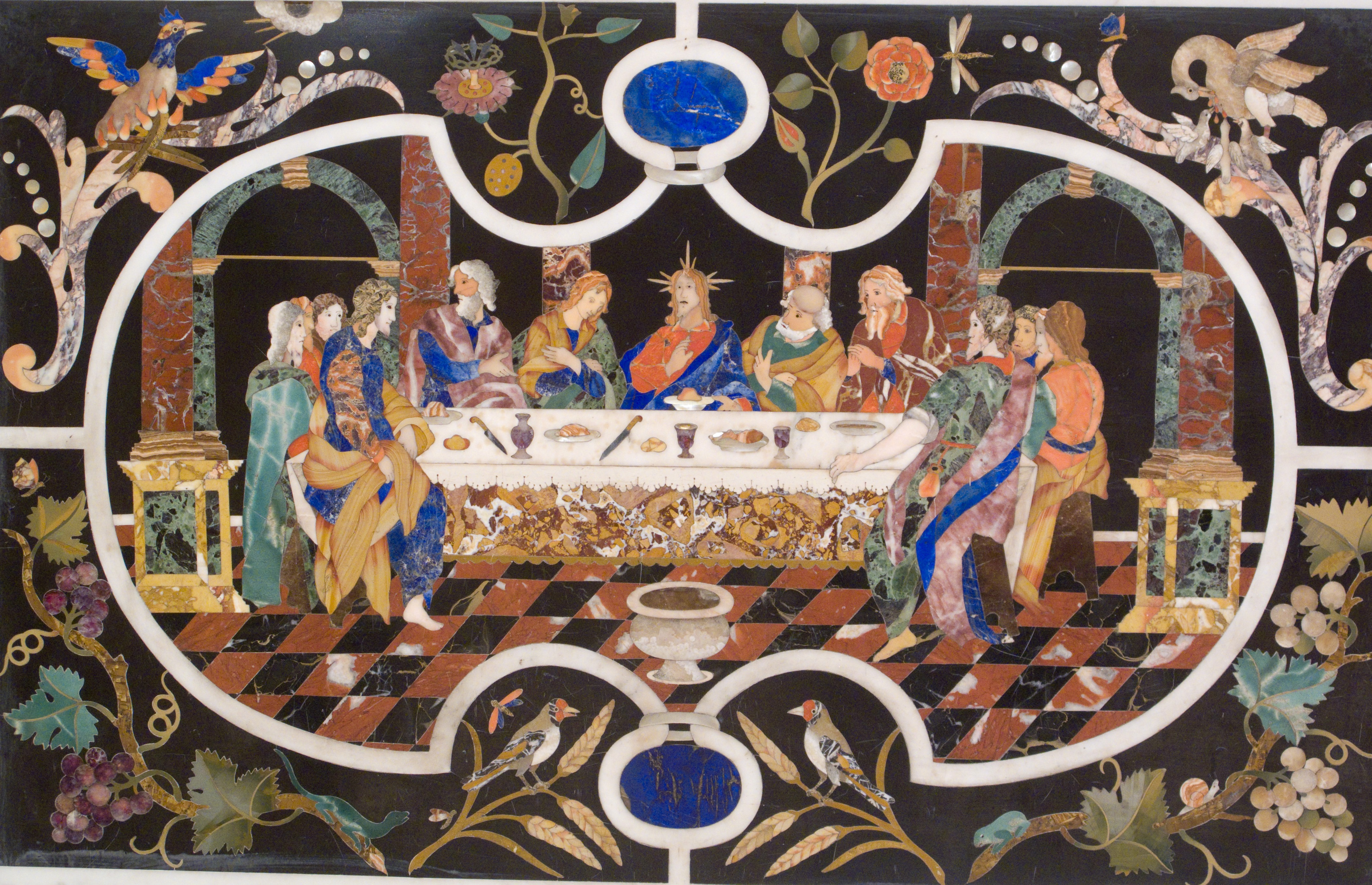
Altar frontal of the central altar: The Last Supper

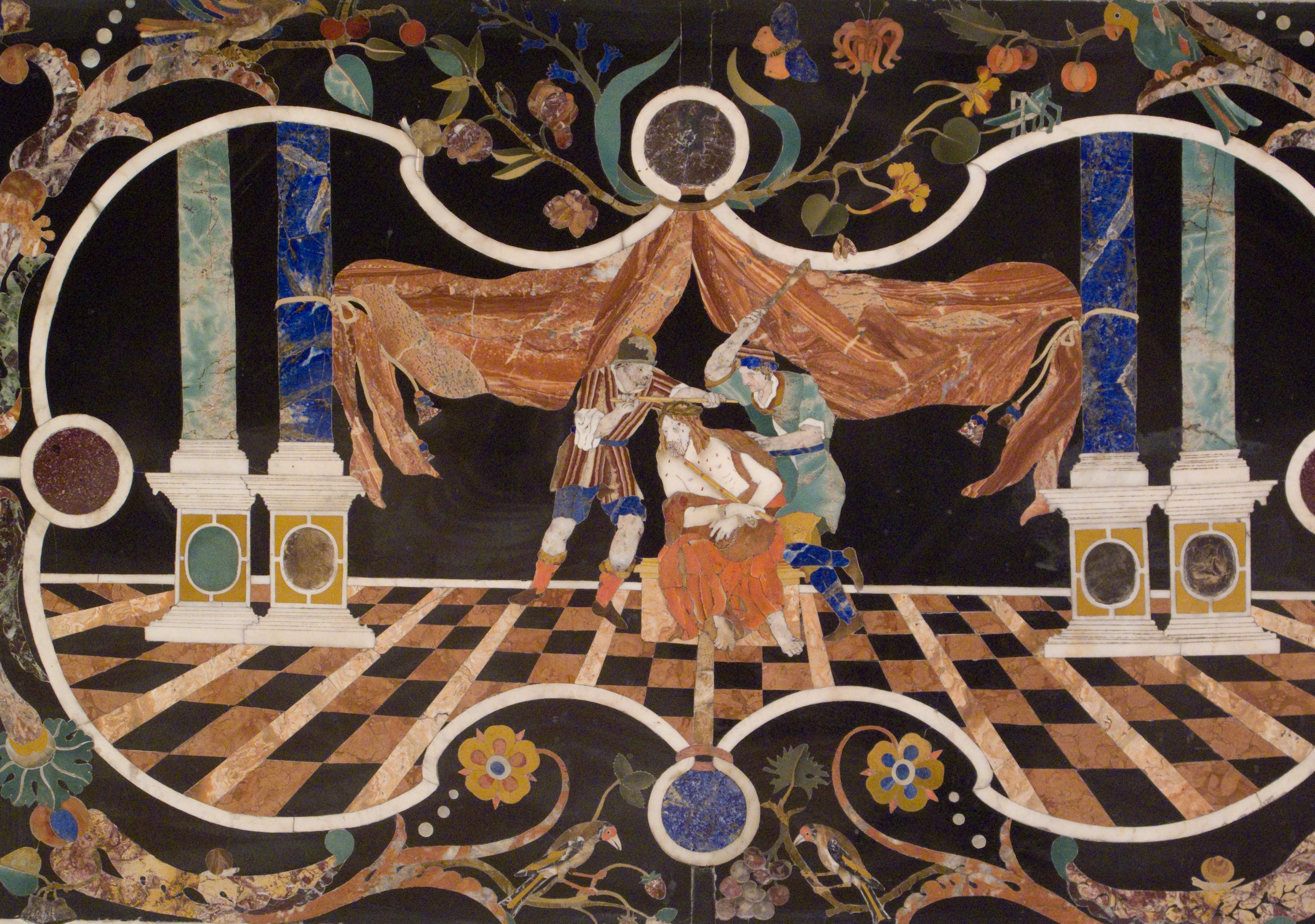
Altar frontal of the central altar: The Crowning with Thorns

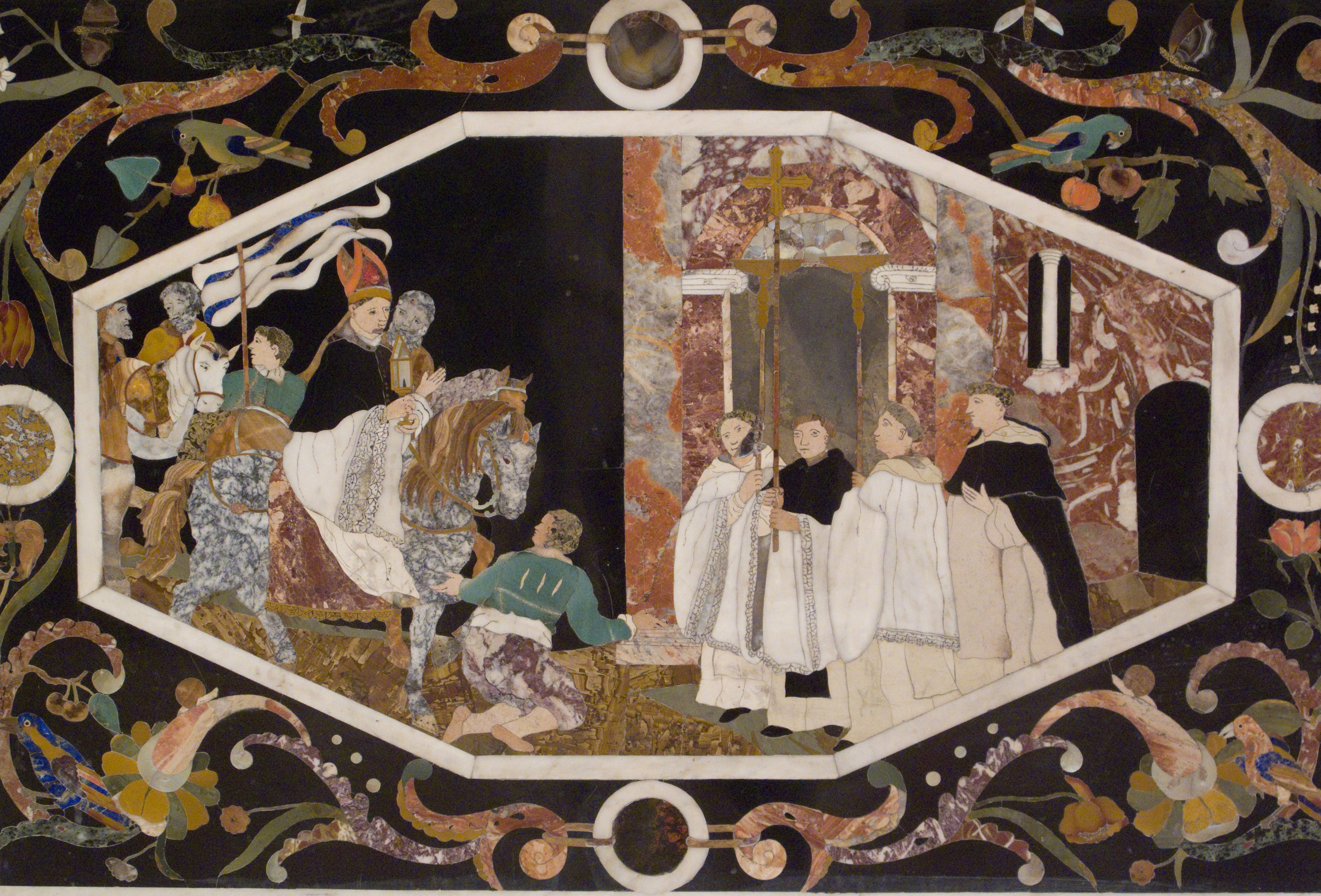
Altar frontal of the central altar: Bishop Bartholomew enters Vicenza

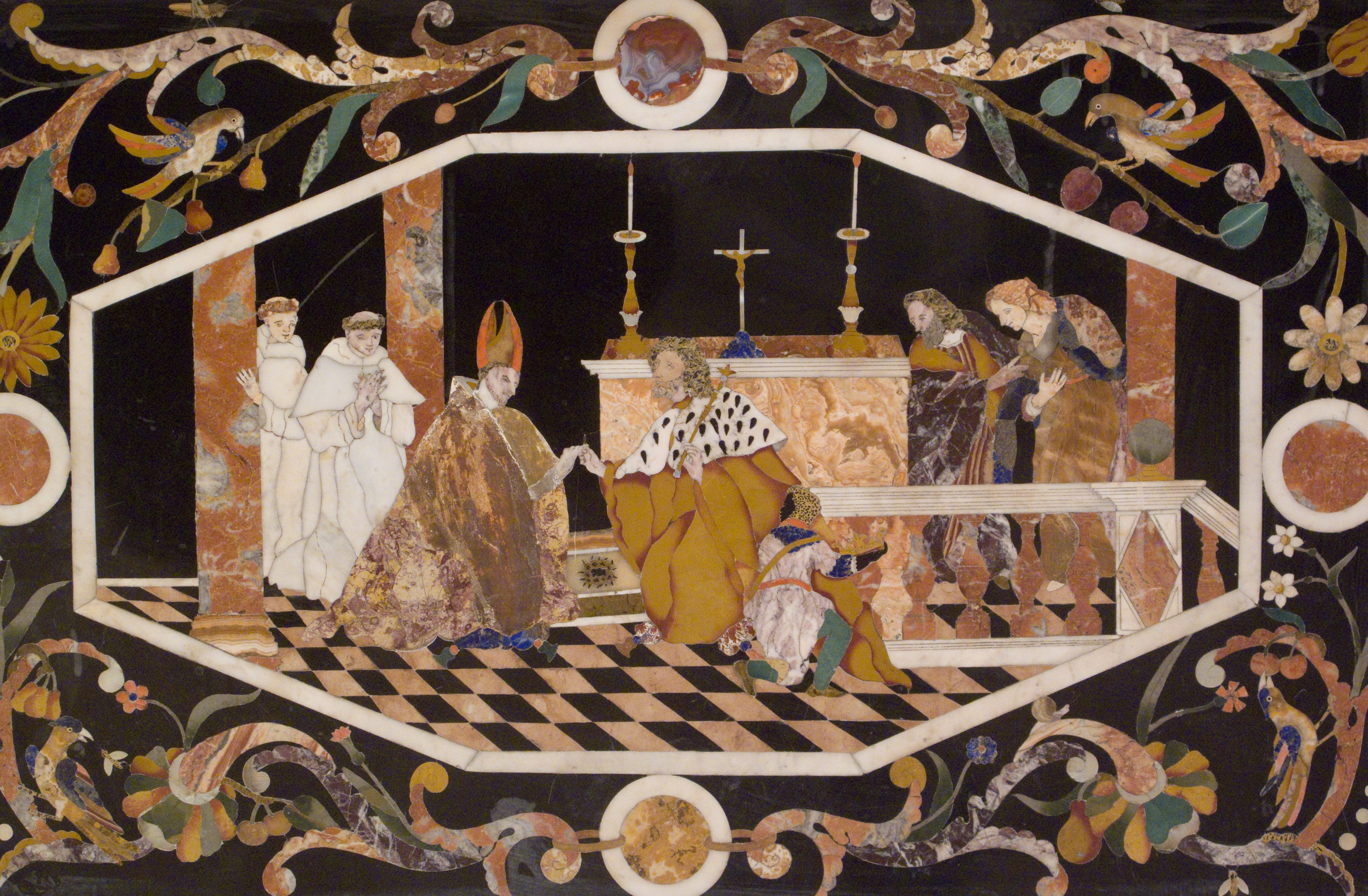
Altar frontal of the central altar: Bishop Bartholomew receives the Holy Thorn from Louis IX of France

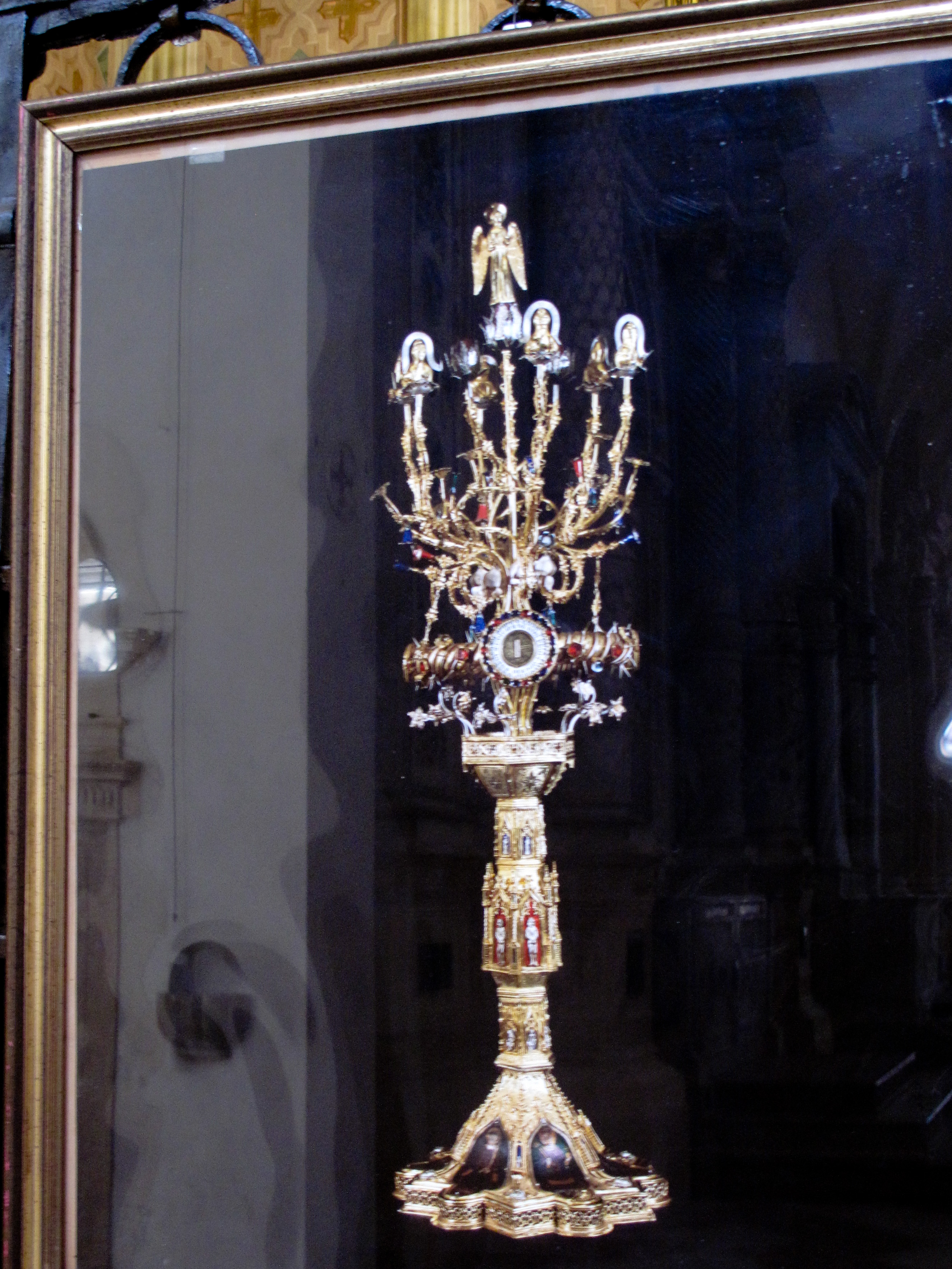
Image of the reliquary, preserved in the Diocesan Museum

==== Holy Thorn Chapel ====
In a rectangular apse covered by a cross vault, at the beginning of the 14th century, the Holy Thorn Chapel was constructed, though its original furnishings have been lost. The chapel was closed in 1521 and reopened only after 1850 to house the Holy Thorn reliquary—a 14th-century Vicentine goldsmith’s work, later transferred to the Diocesan Museum of Vicenza—the precious Parrot Cope, a 12th–13th century work traditionally believed to be a gift from Saint Louis to the blessed Bartholomew, and the urn with the blessed’s remains.

==== Caldogno Chapel (left arm of the transept) ====
When the transept was opened in 1604, Luca Antonio Caldogno added a chapel similar to the opposing Barbarano Chapel; it houses a 17th-century altar of Saint Raymond of Peñafort, with an altarpiece by Alessandro Maganza depicting the Dominican saint. Nearby is a Christ Crowned with Thorns, a 16th-century work by Giacomo Tentorello.

==== Graziani Garzadori Altar ====
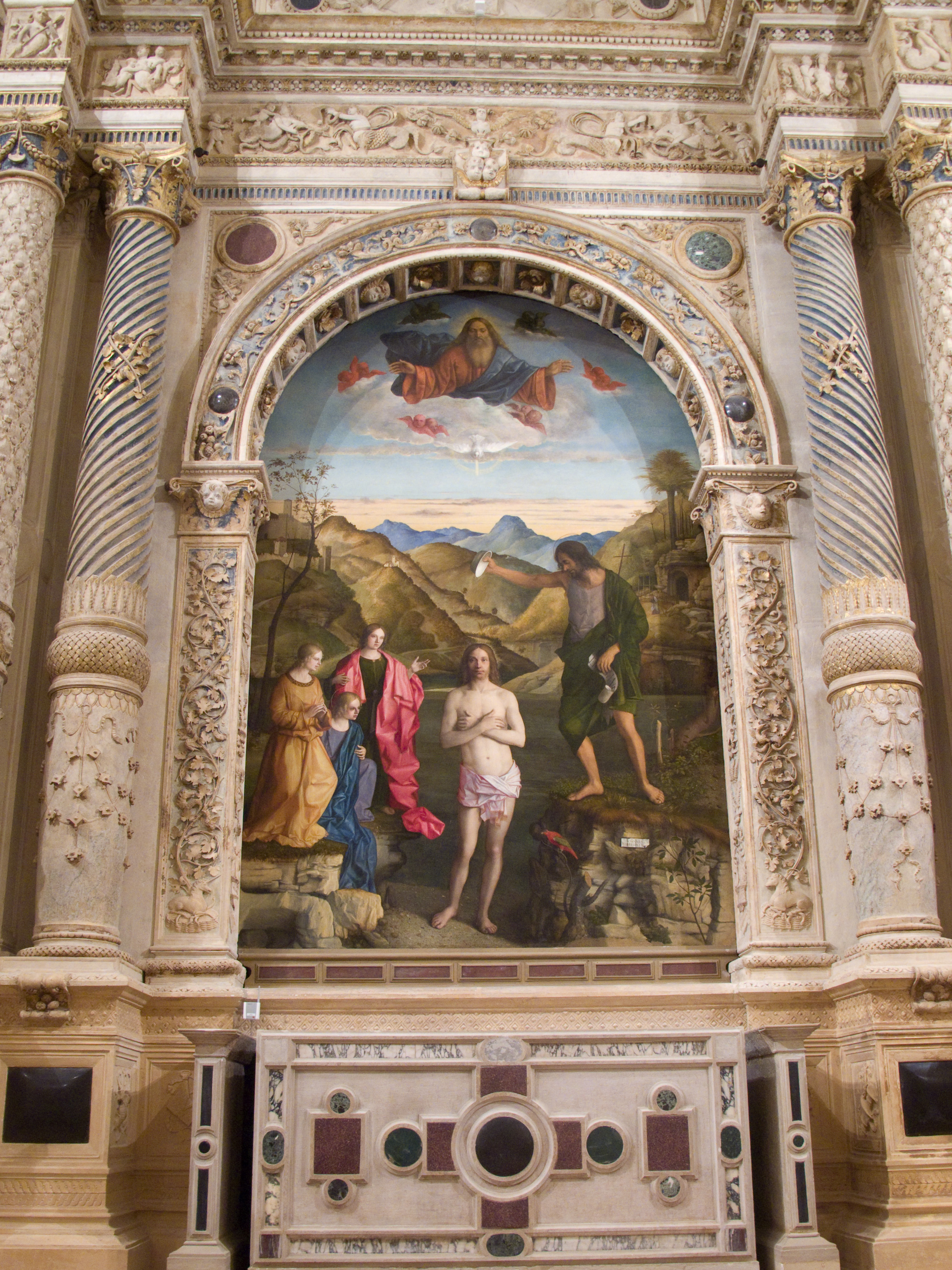
Garzadori Altar

Attached to the wall of the fifth bay on the left is the Garzadori Altar, the most sumptuous in the city, built in the early 16th century by the workshop of Tommaso da Lugano and Bernardino da Como, with contributions from Rocco da Vicenza, designed vertically with a mixed order of columns, pilasters, and pillars. Framing the arch are four ringed columns, adorned with garlands at the base; the upper shafts of the two more prominent ones have Corinthian capitals, while the two recessed ones have Ionic capitals spiraling upward.

Flanking the arch are two narrow recessed pilasters with the Garzadori crests adorned with an imperial eagle and animal heads in the capitals. At the ends, two wider pillars with sphinges in the capitals support the entablature, above which, aligned with the columns, four small pillars hold a wide lowered arch pediment, with a coffered and rosette-decorated intrados and an extrados enriched with bicaudate Nereids and topped by the Redeemer.

Within the tympanum, under a garland of flowers and fruit, is a medallion depicting the Virgin nursing the Child; on either side of the attic, two pairs of facing dolphins hold flaming vases. Throughout are embedded small and large paterae of polychrome marbles brought by Graziani from Palestine, like the black touchstone inserted in the pedestals or those forming a cross adorning the altar frontal of the table.

The altar houses Giovanni Bellini's masterpiece, Baptism of Christ, which was painted around 1500–1502.

==== Madonna of the Stars Altar ====
In 1519, the Confraternity of Mercy erected a structurally simple altar in the fourth bay on the left, made of marble, likely by a Venetian school or the Pedemuro workshop, which was developing a classicist vein at the time.

The altarpiece is the product of two distinct periods and artists. The central part, by an unknown artist, is 14th-century and depicts the Madonna of the Stars in a starry blue cloak nursing the Child; the lower part, attributed to Marcello Fogolino, shows a panorama of Vicenza as seen from Monte Berico, featuring the Furo bridge and the Retrone river, Campo Marzo, the Porta Castello tower, the Cathedral, and the Palazzo della Ragione in its 15th-century form, the Piazza Towers, and, on the left, the bell tower and the Basilica of Saints Felix and Fortunatus; in the background are the peaks of the mountains north of the city.

==== Monza or Sant’Antonio Altar ====
In the third bay on the left is the altar built in 1474 by Gasparo Monza, intended as the family chapel. Above the altar is the painting Saint Antoninus assisted by friars distributing alms to the poor, created by Leandro Bassano.

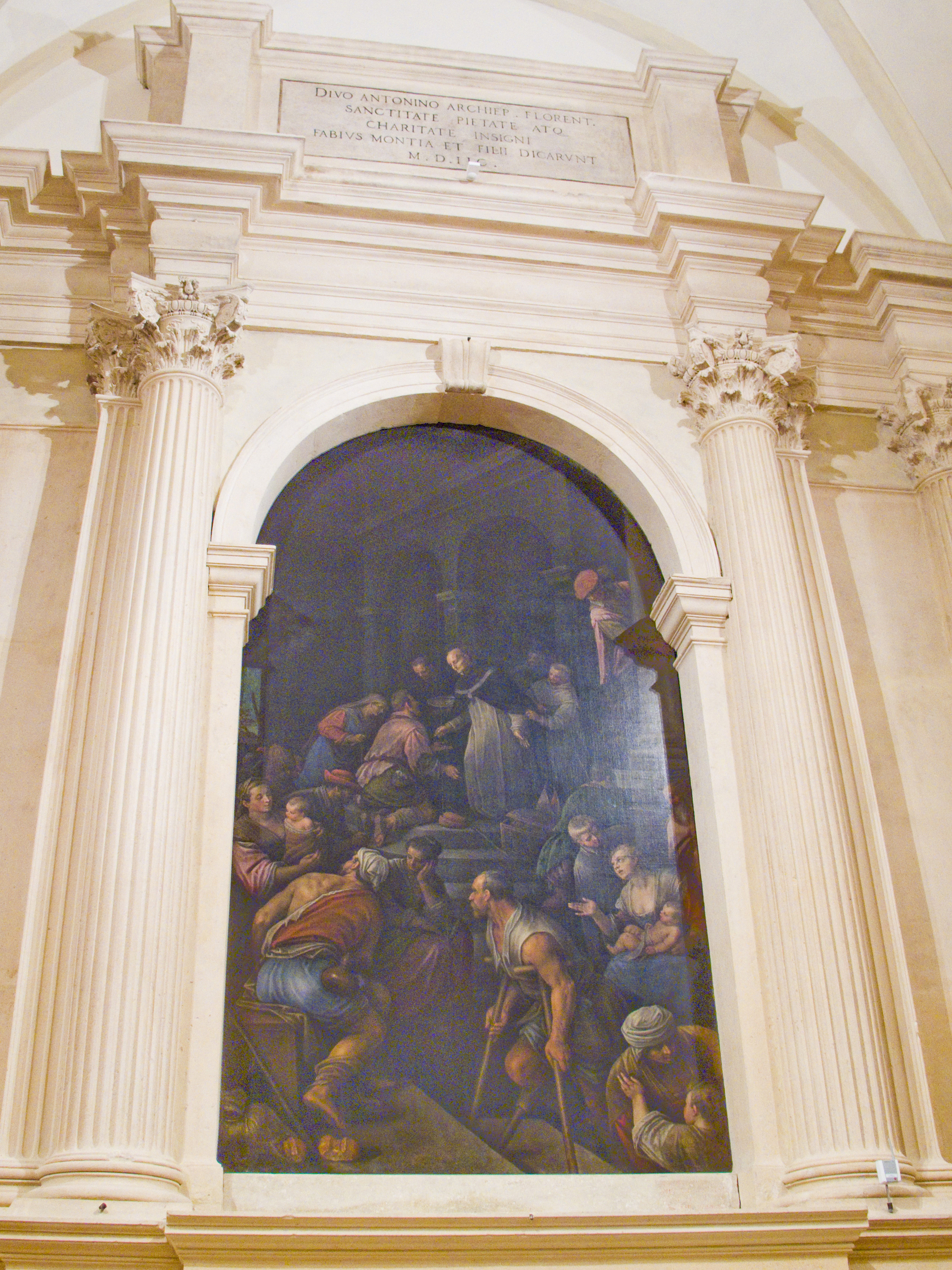
Monza Altar

==== Pagello or Santa Maria Maddalena Altar ====
The majestic altar in the second bay on the left was built—likely by the Pedemuro workshop—in the early 16th century and bears the Pagello family crest at the center of the entablature, commissioned by the family. In 1529, the Vicentine writer Luigi da Porto—author of the novella that inspired Shakespeare’s tragedy Romeo and Juliet—stipulated in his will to be buried in front of this altar.

The altarpiece, painted between 1514 and 1515 by Bartolomeo Montagna, depicts Saint Mary Magdalene with Saints Jerome and Paula on her left, Saint Augustine and Saint Monica on her right. The depiction of Saint Monica, the widowed mother of Saint Augustine, is likely a portrait of the patroness Piera da Porto, widow of Bernardino Pagello.

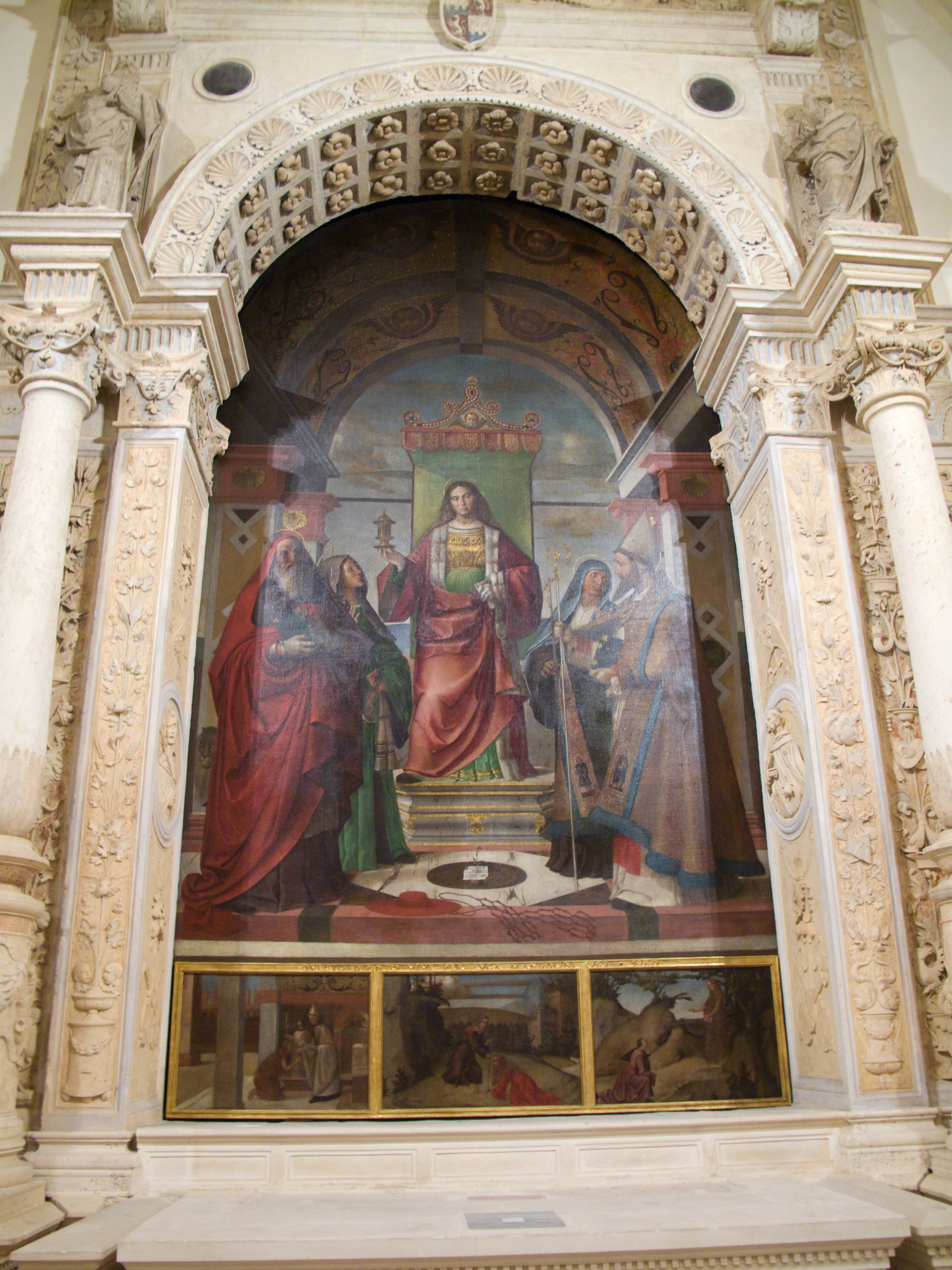
Pagello Altar

==== Nievo or Most Holy Trinity Altar ====
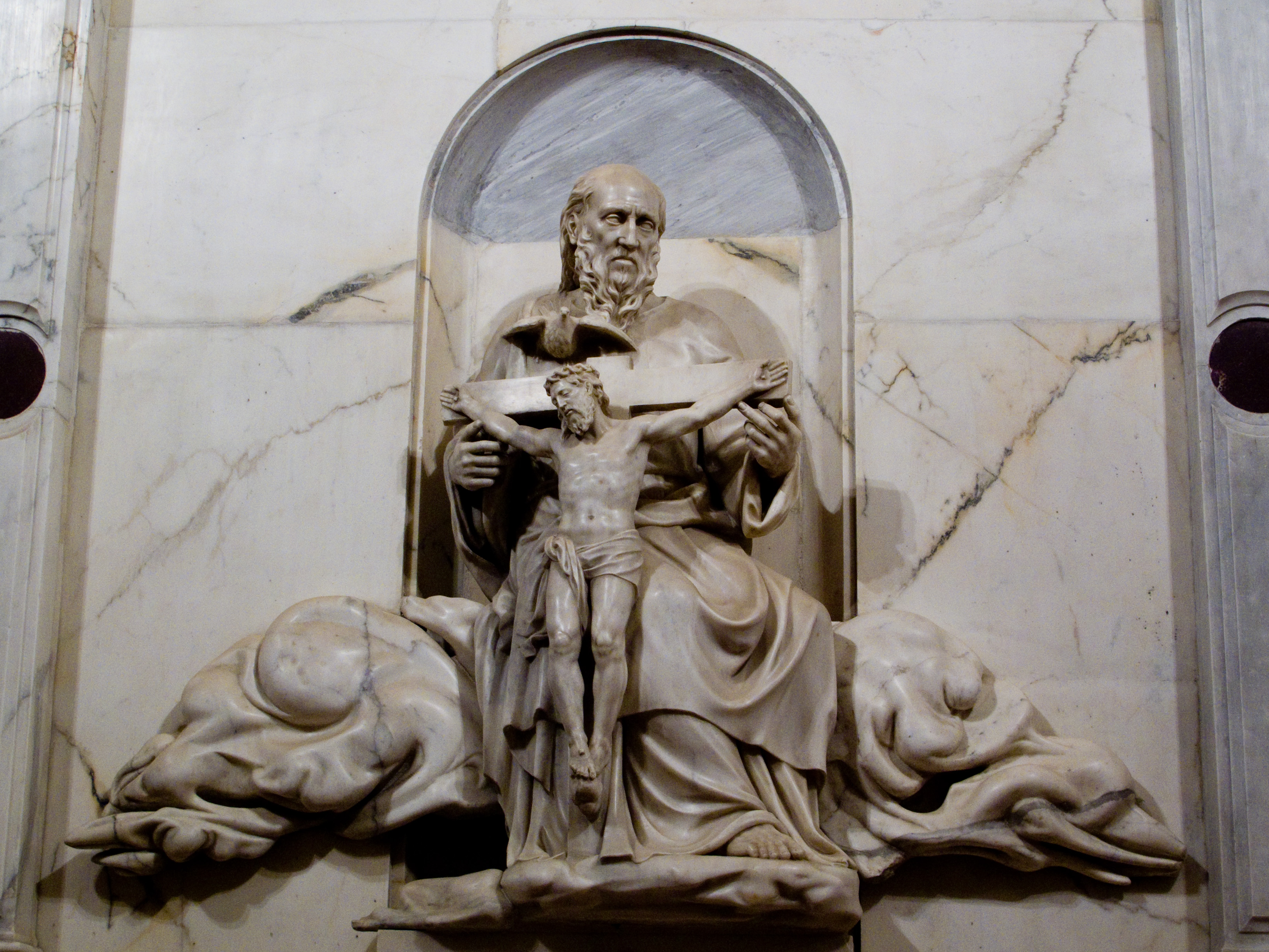
Nievo Altar

In the first bay on the left, an initial altar was erected by Fiordalisa Nievo in 1426; the current one is from the 16th century, produced in a Venetian context or, more likely, by the Pedemuro workshop, which was establishing itself with classical-style production.

Within the niche, amid clouds that seem to swirl, in white Carrara marble, the Trinity is depicted, arranged according to the iconographic model known as the “Throne of Grace”, where the Father, from whose shoulder the dove of the Holy Spirit descends, lifts the crucified Son among exultant angels and cherubs. The group is attributed to Giambattista Krone, a 17th-century sculptor whose only other known works are the three statues in the lunette above the side door of the Church of the Carmini.

=== Bell tower ===
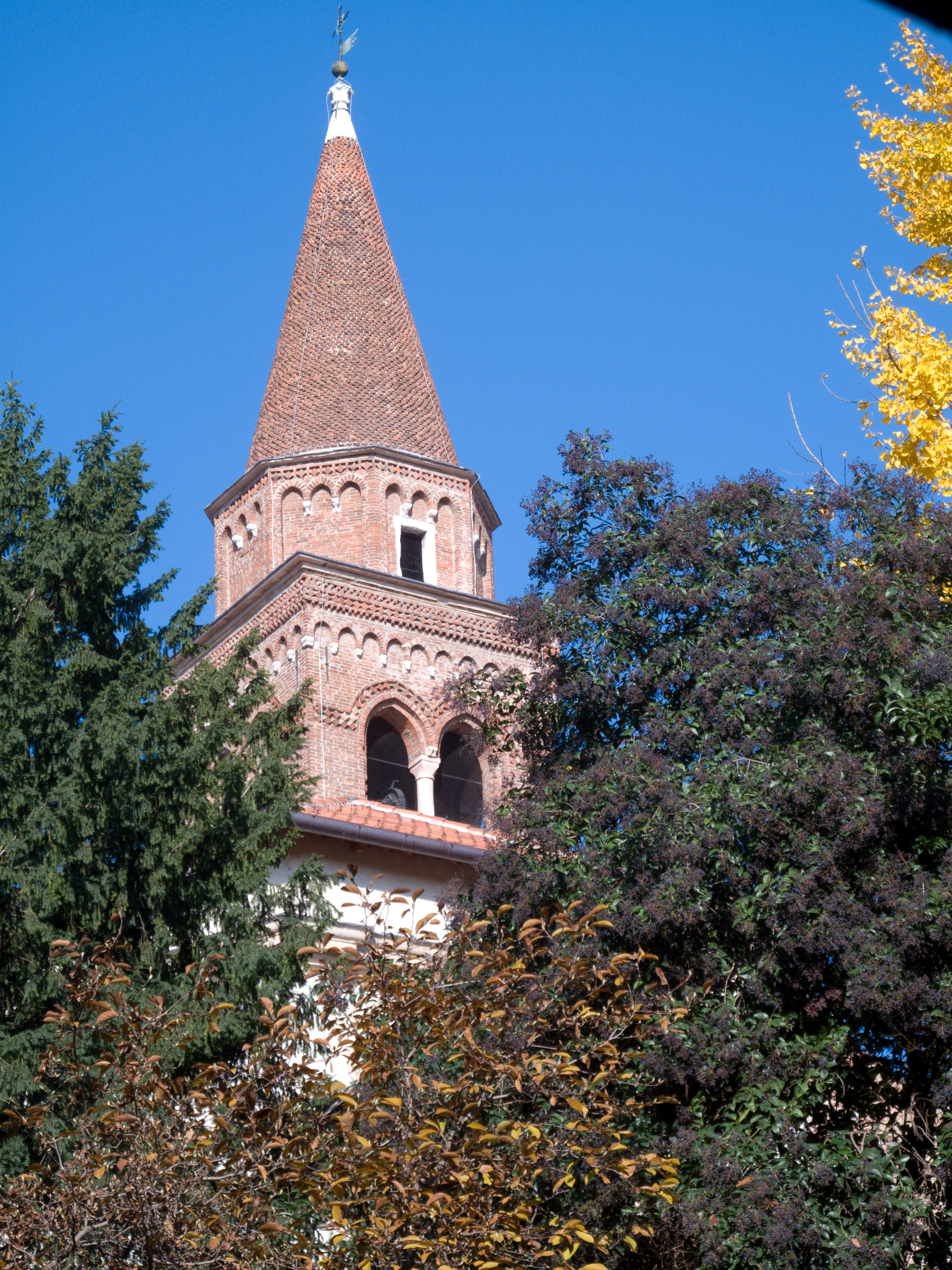
Santa Corona Church – Bell Tower

It is considered one of the most beautiful bell towers in Veneto, where Romanesque architecture is seamlessly transformed into Gothic style.

The lower part of the bell tower, built concurrently with the church, is typically Romanesque: the square brick shaft is divided vertically by four pilasters that end with two bands of decorated arches, above which rises the belfry, open on each side by a bifora with stone columns. Around 1347, the upper structure was added: an octagonal section concluding with a crown of blind arches, above which rises the brick cusp and stone spire.

=== Bells ===
The bells of this church are a historical heritage of particular diocesan and regional significance. The two larger bells, tuned to F3 and B♭3, were crafted by Vicentine founder Vincenzo Canton in 1761.

Little is known about Canton’s work, as he was a contemporary of the founder De Maria, a prominent figure in the Vicentine school, whose works are more numerous (the large bell of the Cathedral and two other bells currently in use are by De Maria).

The third, smaller bell is tuned to C4. It was crafted by the renowned Colbachini founders in Bassano del Grappa, where they first worked in the Angarano district. They worked extensively for the Vicenza diocese.

=== Cloister ===
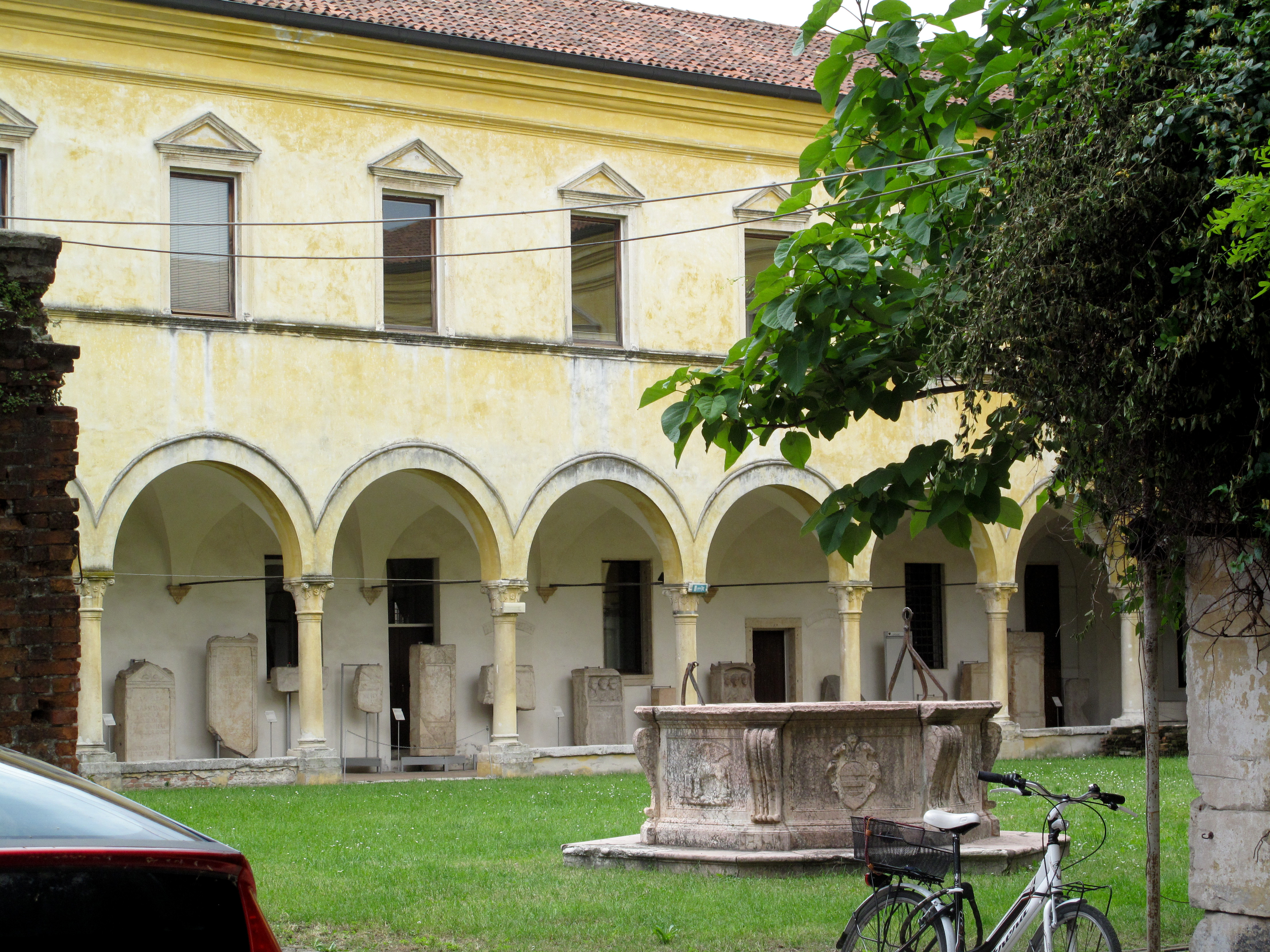
Santa Corona Church – Convent cloister

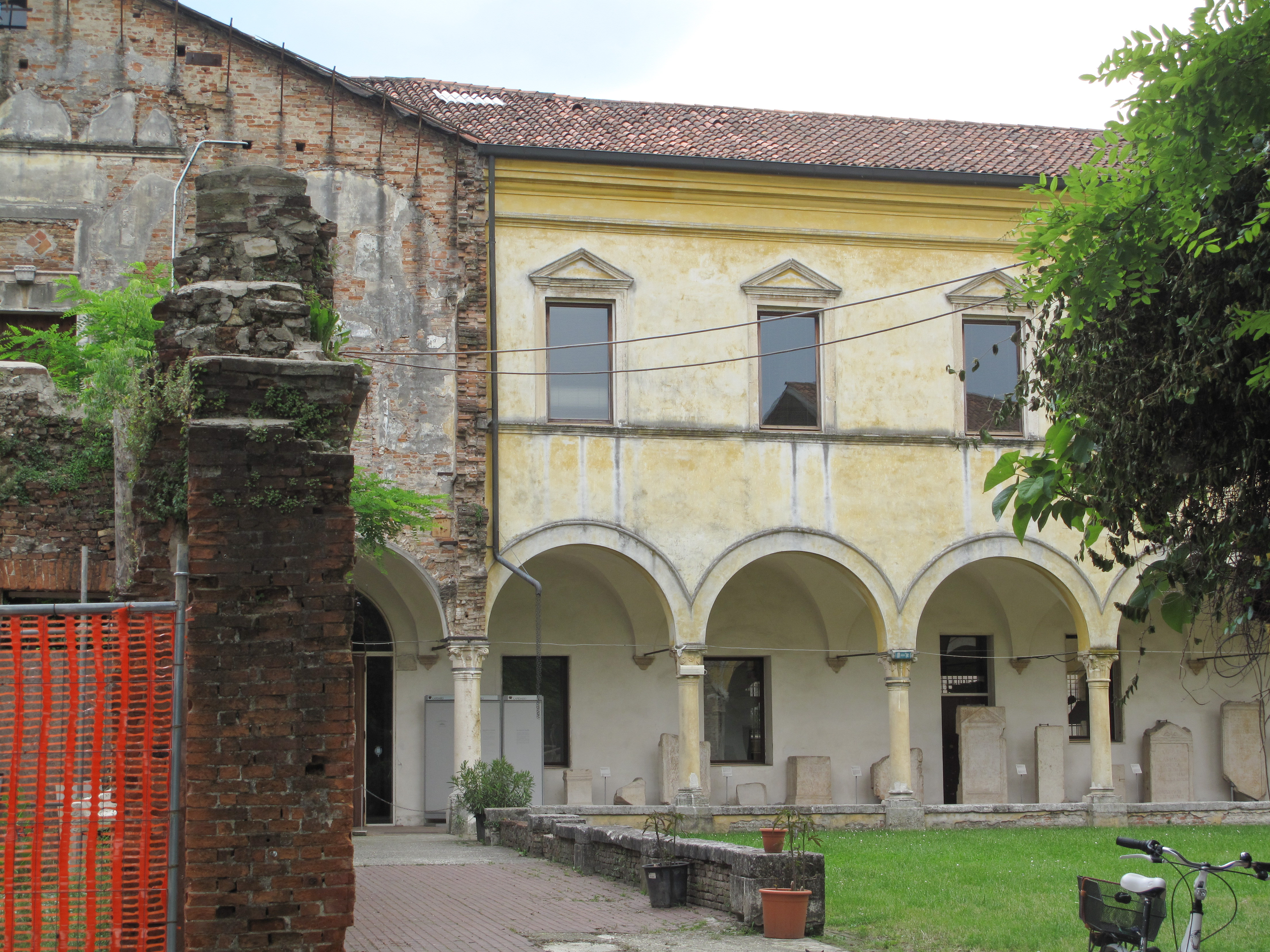
Convent cloister

== See also ==
- Baptism of Christ (Bellini)
- Bartholomew of Breganze
- History of Vicenza
- History of religious life in Vicenza
- History of religious architecture in Vicenza

== Bibliography ==
- Bandini, Ferdinando (2002). La chiesa venuta da Gerusalemme, Santa Corona [The Church from Jerusalem, Santa Corona]. Vicenza: Ed. Fotogramma.
- Barbieri, Franco; Cevese, Renato (2004). Vicenza, ritratto di una città [Vicenza, Portrait of a City]. Vicenza: Angelo Colla editore. ISBN 88-900990-7-0.
- Mantese, Giovanni (1954). Memorie storiche della Chiesa vicentina, II, Dal Mille al Milletrecento [Historical Memories of the Vicentine Church, II, From 1000 to 1300]. Vicenza: Accademia Olimpica.
- Mantese, Giovanni (1958). Memorie storiche della Chiesa vicentina, III/1, Il Trecento [Historical Memories of the Vicentine Church, III/1, The 14th Century]. Vicenza: Accademia Olimpica.
- Mantese, Giovanni (1964). Memorie storiche della Chiesa vicentina, III/2, Dal 1404 al 1563 [Historical Memories of the Vicentine Church, III/2, From 1404 to 1563]. Vicenza: Neri Pozza editore.
- Mantese, Giovanni (1974a). Memorie storiche della Chiesa vicentina, IV/1, Dal 1563 al 1700 [Historical Memories of the Vicentine Church, IV/1, From 1563 to 1700]. Vicenza: Accademia Olimpica.
- Mantese, Giovanni (1974b). Memorie storiche della Chiesa vicentina, IV/2, Dal 1563 al 1700 [Historical Memories of the Vicentine Church, IV/2, From 1563 to 1700]. Vicenza: Accademia Olimpica.
- Mantese, Giovanni (1982a). Memorie storiche della Chiesa vicentina, V/1, Dal 1700 al 1866 [Historical Memories of the Vicentine Church, V/1, From 1700 to 1866]. Vicenza: Accademia Olimpica.
- Mantese, Giovanni (1982b). Memorie storiche della Chiesa vicentina, V/2, Dal 1700 al 1866 [Historical Memories of the Vicentine Church, V/2, From 1700 to 1866]. Vicenza: Accademia Olimpica.
- Fiore, Davide (2009). Fiore, Davide (ed.). Tesori da Santa Corona. Bellini, Veronese, Pittoni e altri maestri della pittura veneta dal XIV al XVIII secolo [Treasures from Santa Corona. Bellini, Veronese, Pittoni and Other Masters of Venetian Painting from the 14th to 18th Century]. Vicenza: Terra Ferma Edizioni.
