= History of religious life in Vicenza =

The city of Vicenza and its territory have a rich history of religious tradition and culture. Over the centuries multiple expressions of popular faith have been translated into events and works of art, just as significant has been the presence of ecclesiastical institutions that, alongside civil ones, have influenced social life.

== Centuries I B.C.-III A.D. ==
=== Pre-Christian cults ===
What is known of religious life in Roman Vicenza is based on the finding of dedications or inscriptions on stone, devotional statuettes, sacred altars, sacella and sacred grottos scattered throughout the countryside and valleys, while no information is obtained from chronicles or written texts. Some elements of a local religiosity with characteristics dissimilar to those of the neighboring Verona and Padua emerge from the archaeological finds.

Although public celebrations of official deities and the deified figure of the emperor were certainly not missing, as in all Roman cities, the finds from the Vicenza area concern rather the private devotion of individual inhabitants of the city and the countryside.

Secondly, most of the finds concern female deities: Diana, Fortuna, Venus, Nemesis, the Nymphs, Isis, all deities of Greek, Eastern or Egyptian origin whose cult had been imported and integrated into the Hellenistic-Roman pantheon. Lelia Cracco Ruggini points out that these are always goddesses of fertility, nature, hunting, and water, and thus hypothesizes that they represent the transposition into Roman culture of the more ancient cult of Reitia – the Venetian mother goddess of fertility whose votive plate was found in Vicenza in 1959 – or at any rate of indigenous female deities who were protectors of the forces of nature. This maintenance of a devotion prior to the conquest by Rome seems to be typical of populations where assimilation took place peacefully and gradually, as it did for Vicenza.

== Centuries IV-VI ==
=== Early Christianity in Vicenza ===
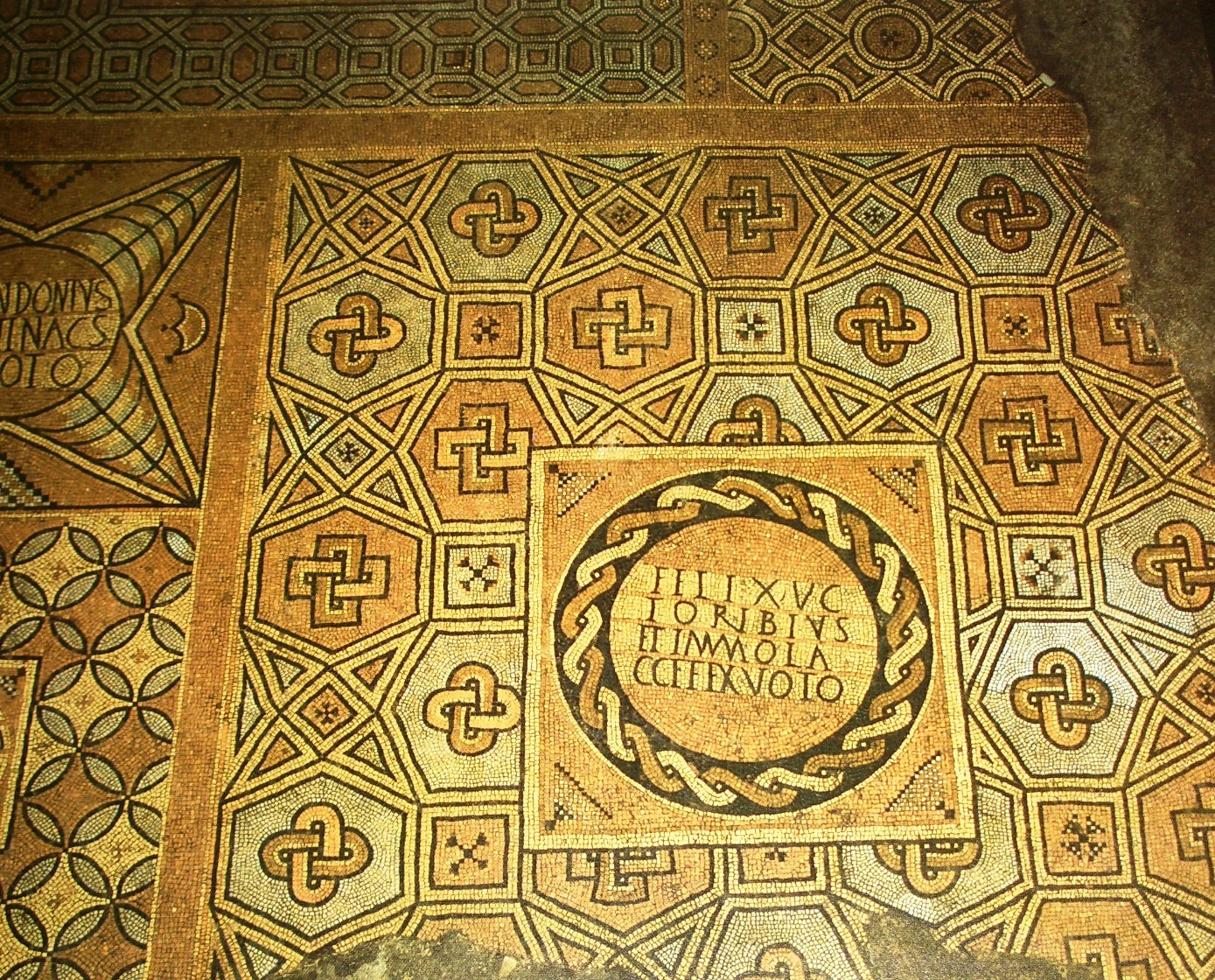
The mosaic in the center of the Basilica of Saints Felix and Fortunatus

It was Aquileia, a great city and commercial port, the center of the spread of Christianity in the X Regio Venetia et Histria; the first followers of the new faith were not so much the common people, but the military, travelers, and merchants who had frequent contacts with the East and had cultural openness: it was among these few that presbyters were chosen in the second half of the third century. Probably the penetration of Christianity into Aquileia – and consequently into the Venetias – came about through relations with circles in Alexandria and the Judeo-Christian groups of the large Jewish colony residing in Aquileia; evidence of such relations would seem to be expressed in the formulation of the "Aquileian creed," as handed down by the 4th-century bishop Rufinus, and in the Sabbatarian cult practiced in the region.

The fact that Christianity had already arrived in the territory of Vicenza towards the end of the 3rd century would be attested by the martyrdom – which occurred in 303-304 during the period of Diocletian's persecutions – of the two brothers Felix and Fortunatus, who were beheaded in Aquileia for not wanting to renounce their faith.

The community of believers in Vicenza grew rapidly, in part because of the favor granted to Christianity by the emperors after the Edict of Milan in 313, to the point that some authors speculate an early transfer of Felix's body to Vicenza in order to venerate his relics. In any case, they were brought to the city before the end of the fourth century, when the first sacellum intended to house his remains was built, replaced a few years later by the basilica outside the walls, dedicated to Saints Felix and Fortunatus.

The building of a city church, which two centuries later would become the cathedral of Santa Maria Annunciata, also dates to the same period. Both churches were initially built with one nave and completely remade, larger and with three naves, in the mid-5th century. Toward the end of the same century the basilica of Saints Felix and Fortunatus was joined by a martyrion dedicated to Sancta Maria Mater Domini, in the name of the devotion to Mary, Mother of God that spread after the Council of Chalcedon in 451. The findings therefore suggest that at that time the Christian community was flourishing and organized enough to afford the erection of two buildings of worship at the same time: the mosaic floors that can still be seen in San Felice, in which the names of donor families are inscribed, testify to the munificence and social status of the faithful.

Because of these considerations, some historians have speculated that the first ecclesiastical organization dated back to that time and that Vicenza was already an episcopal see in the fourth century – as were many other cities of the Venetiae – of which, however, there is no mention in the available documentation. Indeed, among the numerous records of the presence of Venetian bishops at councils in northern Italy, there is no mention of a Vicentine until the late 6th century, when Orontius is mentioned.

The construction of two churches, one inside the city and the other outside the walls, might have corresponded to the needs of the Christian community at that time: community prayer, catechesis, and the celebration of the Eucharist and the sacraments, which could be celebrated by the bishop of another city on a pastoral visit or by a priest delegated by him. It is likely that until the end of the 6th century the community of Vicenza referred to the bishop and diocese of Padua, a city on which it also gravitated civilly, and became autonomous only after the establishment of the Lombard Kingdom, of which Padua was not initially a part.

== Centuries VI-VII ==
=== The period of the Schism of the Three Chapters ===
The initial period of Lombard domination in the Veneto represented the time when different cultures (which would only be partially integrated in the 8th century) characterized also by the diversity of religious denominations were pitted against each other.

A few years before the invasion – which took place in 568-569 – the Byzantine emperor Justinian, in order not to displease the Monophysites who were still numerous even after the Council of Chalcedon in the eastern regions of the empire, had condemned by his own edict some writings (chapters) of three theologians, who had enjoyed great authority at Chalcedon.

Many bishops of Northern Italy, including those of Milan and Aquileia, had been unwilling to endure this imposition. Their dissent had deepened at the time of Pope Pelagius I, who had not only accepted the edict but had addressed an epistle to the Byzantine general Narses. However, Narses did not want to obey the request and invited him to crush the rebellion by force.

At that point the Patriarchate of Aquileia became hierarchically independent and the bishops elected Patriarch Paulinus I to emphasize their autonomy. Aquileia no longer recognized the pope's authority and vigorously contested to the point of rupture – hence the name Schism of the Three Chapters – his attitude, which they felt was wavering on the issue of the three condemned theologians, as it did not counter the interference of the Byzantine emperor's power in doctrinal matters.

At the time of their migration to Italy in 568-69, the Lombards were Christians of the Arian faith, a faith superficially superimposed on a substratum of well-established pagan traditions and values that constituted the identity of the ethnic group. When they arrived, preceded by a reputation as a fierce people, Paulinus moved his seat and relics to Grado (Aquileia Nova), which remained under Byzantine sovereignty like the rest of the coastal strip. Instead, most of the inland cities and their dioceses were incorporated into the new kingdom.

After Paulinus' death, the synod of Aquileia-Grado elected Elia in 571, who was also opposed to the orientations of the emperor and the pope. The Patriarchate was all with him: as a synod convened in Grado in 579 reiterated, the Tricapitoline Church remained strictly Chalcedonian, maintained the Niceno-Constantinopolitan creed, professed no Christological heresy and venerated Mary as "Mother of God." In 579 the new pope, Pelagius II, granted Elia the metropolia over the Venetias and Istria in an attempt to recompose the schism, which, however, had a large popular following; Elia's successor, Severus, then convened a synod at Marano in 590, which was attended by 10 bishops – including Orontius, the first bishop of Vicenza, as recorded by Paul the Deacon – in which the easternmost cities of the Regio, in contrast to Aquileia and all the others who intended to persevere in the three-chapter position in separation from Rome, stood close to the pope.

Thus in 606, upon the death of Severus, the Patriarchate was divided into two sees, Aquileia and Grado. In Aquileia the patriarch Giovanni, a tricapitoline, was appointed with the support of the Lombards; in Grado, to whose see was reserved jurisdiction over territories under Byzantine domination, the patriarch Candidiano, a Catholic, was appointed, supported by the exarch.

Vicenza therefore, which had always maintained strong ties with Aquileia, remained steadfast in its tricapitoline faith throughout the first century of Lombard rule. There is no record of any Arian church being built in the city or territory, and there is no evidence whatsoever that the people of Vicenza adhered to the victors' creed.

The schism, initially favored by the Lombards in opposition to Byzantium and Rome, was resolved by the Lombards themselves. In the second half of the 7th century they gradually converted to Catholicism and came closer to the pope. After the Battle of Coronate in 689, in which the Catholic king Cunipert routed the Arian duke of Lombard Austria Alahis – who was also supported by many Romanic adherents of the Three-Chapter schism – the Catholic faith finally imposed itself on the dissenters. In 698, Cunipert convened a synod at Pavia in which the Catholic and tricapitoline bishops, including Peter I, Patriarch of Aquileia, recomposed "in the spirit of Chalcedon" their doctrinal and hierarchical communion.

Thus a new cultural climate matured, evidenced by a number of elements, such as the decorative renovation of churches and palaces – although in Vicenza there is very little evidence of the Liutprandean Revival – the abandonment of the use of grave goods, the mixing of names, whereby many Lombards took on names of Roman and Christian tradition and Romans took on Germanic names, and the sharing of the same language, all demonstrating that the sense of identity of the lineage was fading.

== 8th-12th centuries: the early Middle Ages ==
=== The network of Benedictine abbeys ===
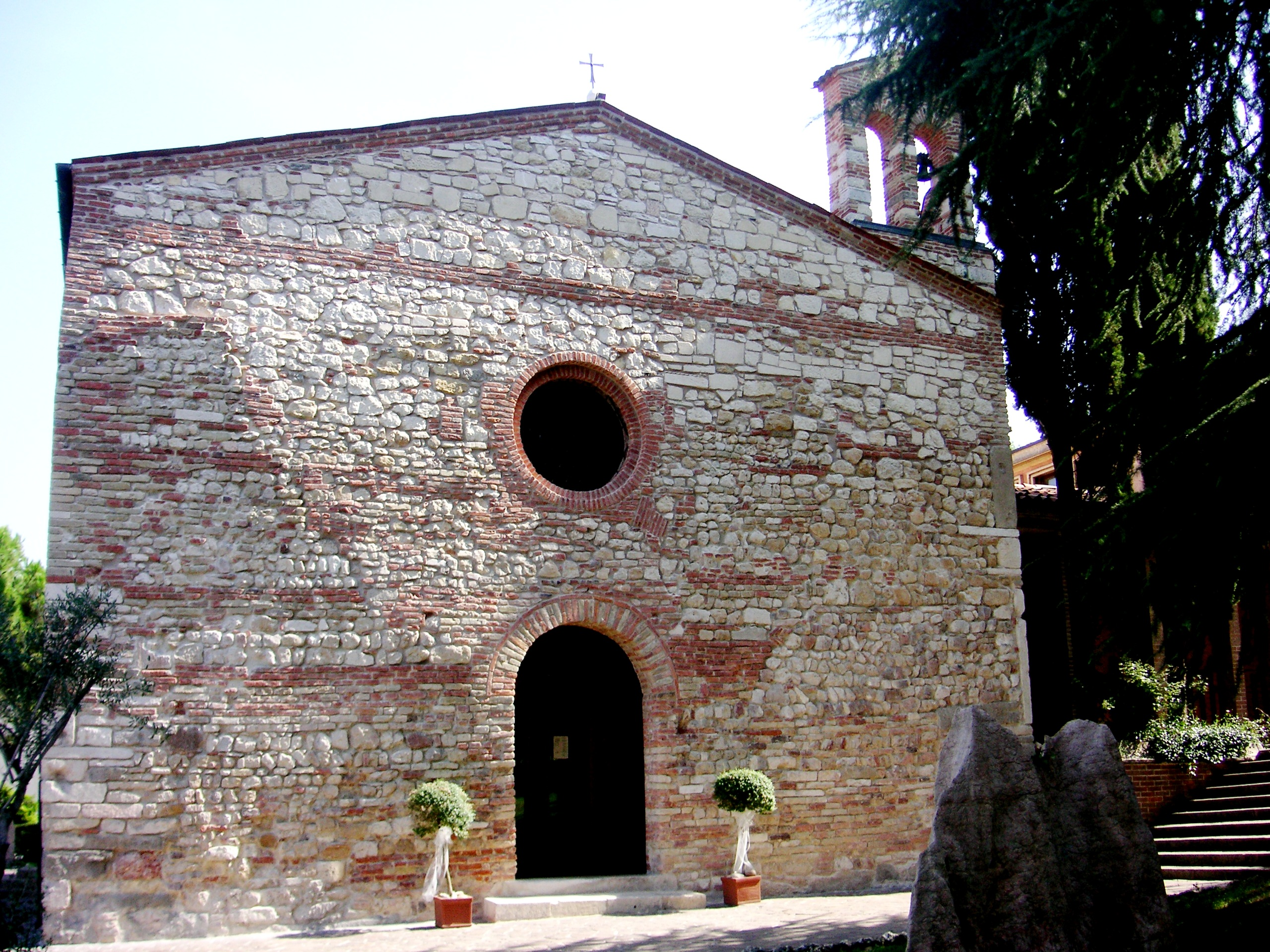
The facade of the church of San Giorgio in Gogna

After the conversion of the Lombards to Catholicism, and especially around the middle of the 8th century, many nobles – in some cases the king himself or dukes – founded monasteries throughout Italy – some even in the territory of Vicenza – financing their construction and endowing them with considerable economic resources. The foundation of the abbey attached to the basilica of Saints Felix and Fortunatus in Vicenza most likely dates back to the end of the Lombard or early Carolingian period, although no certain date is documented. Also predating the year 1000 are the churches and attached Benedictine monasteries of San Giorgio in Gogna, San Silvestro, and that of San Pietro – which became the most important female Benedictine abbey until contemporary times – all located just outside the walls of Vicenza.

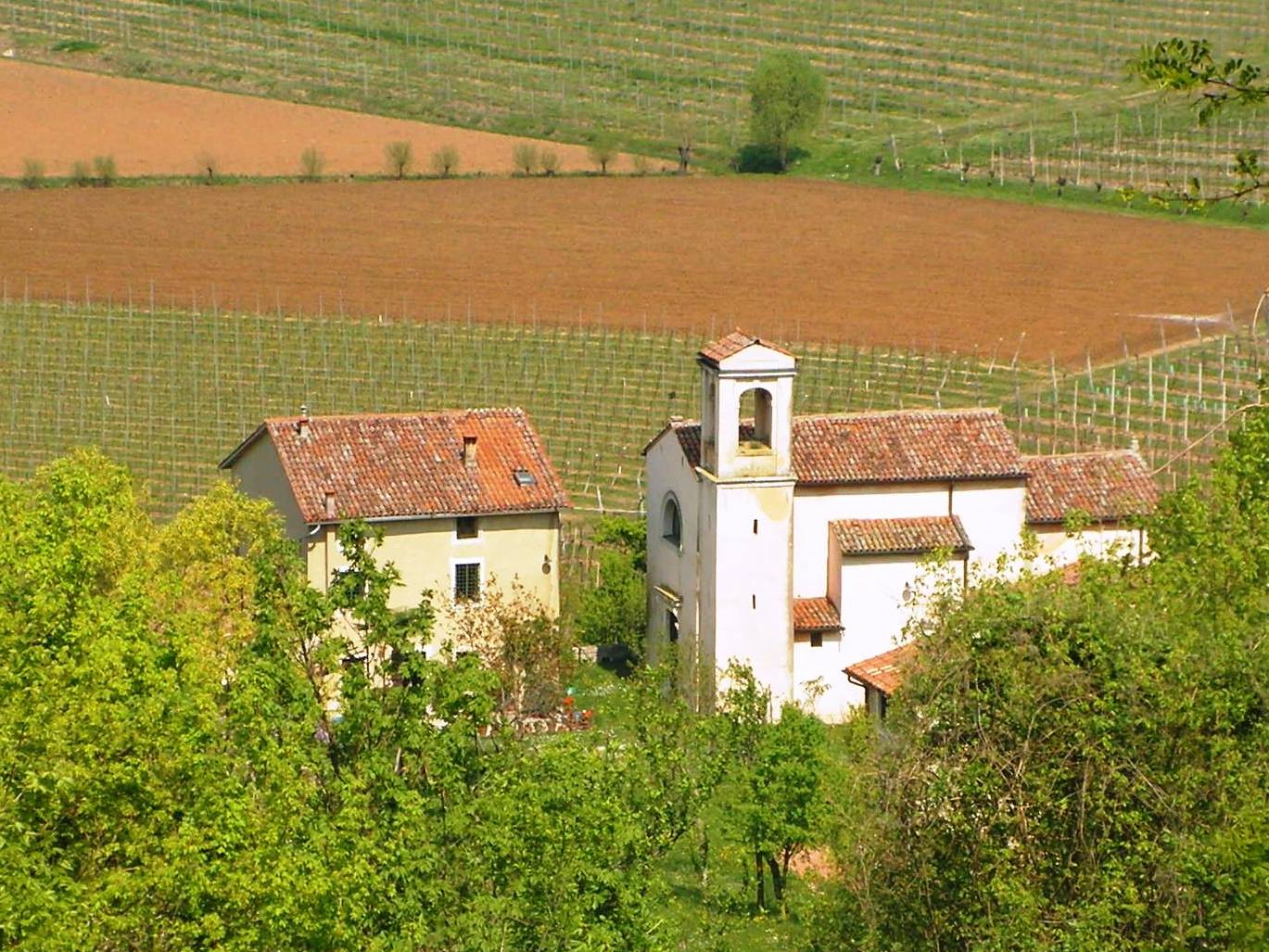
The small Benedictine courtyard in San Vito di Brendola

Many churches and chapels, farmhouses, lands and curtes are mentioned in the Privilegium of 983, by which Bishop Rudolf granted the Benedictines of San Felice large estates in the territory of Vicenza. Of many other ancient churches scattered over the Vicentine territory there is no certain dating, but their titular saints – namely, Vitus, Modestus and Crescentia – suggest both a Benedictine origin and the 8th or 9th centuries as the period of foundation, since they were particularly dear to the Carolingian dynasty.

The widespread diffusion of the Benedictines depended on the favor of the civil and religious authorities, both because of the social utility they represented as centers of aggregation and resource production, with their work of reclaiming unhealthy and marshy lands, and because of the pastoral activity they carried out in the reclaimed lands, which were too far from the city parishes. Their prestige was also enhanced by the fact that, during the early Middle Ages, the monastic lifestyle appeared as a religious ideal of Christian living and escape from a world of violence and oppression.

=== The diocesan organization ===
==== The evolution of parishes ====
From late antiquity and until the time of Charlemagne, ecclesiastical organization had maintained the initial structure that traced the administrative divisions of Roman times. The territory of the diocese corresponded to the civil district under the city and was divided into a unitary urban parish (the first to be established) and a number of rural parishes that corresponded to civil districts.

A characteristic aspect was the presence of a single baptismal font for the entire parish: in the city of Vicenza it remained the only one until the reform of parishes in the Napoleonic period, except for the two fonts outside the walls entrusted to the Benedictine monks of San Felice and San Vito (later Santa Lucia). Other small churches or chapels also existed within the parish, but they all depended on the parish. All clergy – priests, deacons, subdeacons and clerics – lived together with the archpriest, the bishop's representative, in the common house, the rectory.

After the Frankish conquest Charlemagne sought to consolidate the kingdom by using the diocesan hierarchy and ecclesiastical organization: even men trusted by the king were appointed to head the patriarchate of Aquileia and the diocese of Vicenza. In order to provide a legal and economic basis for this organization, Charlemagne's capitularies changed the territorial areas of the dioceses and parishes, assigning to each of them rents – tithes – sufficient for the maintenance of those who held them.

This approach also changed religious life and pastoral activity: the poles of devotional attraction were no longer, as had been established toward the end of the Lombard period, the monasteries. A spirituality based on the monastic ideal of asceticism was replaced by a demand for passive adherence to the truths of faith and the regular practice of worship.

However, this arrangement – which corresponded to an attempt to strengthen the political-religious unity of the state – rapidly entered a crisis in the mid-9th century, with the end of the Carolingian dynasty.

During the period of anarchy, characterized by violence, degradation of social life and oppression of the poor, bishops tended to reproduce the worldly lifestyle of the ruling classes from which they came. The priests who worked with them, and those often appointed by the lords of the private churches they themselves founded, because they could read and write were employed as tax collectors to the detriment of the peasantry. Other priests, on the other hand, those who were poorer because they owned churches that yielded little income, were forced to neglect pastoral work in order to survive and often took a woman into their homes to contribute to their maintenance.

The monasteries resumed their role as centers of attraction for religious life, but they became at the same time political and economic powers because their organization fitted well into the emerging feudal system. Through donations, testamentary legacies and the allocation of property and privileges they greatly extended their possessions over the territory, often competing and fighting with secular lords who, in turn, used violent methods to appropriate them. The few documents from the early Middle Ages that have come down to us, relating to the territory of Vicenza, mainly concern the granting of possessions and benefits to the Benedictines of San Felice.

All this corresponded to the imperial policy of favoring the monastic orders, with which the bishops collaborated, but it aggravated the situation of the parishes and the diocesan priests, who found themselves increasingly short of means.

Especially after the year 1000, due to a combination of factors – in addition to those already mentioned, the increase in population, which led to a different distribution of settlements in the territory – the rural parishes disintegrated completely: chapels and branch churches became autonomous from the parish church, each with its own priest, who no longer practiced common life with the others, and baptismal fonts multiplied.

==== The role of the bishops ====
After the devastating raids of the Hungarians, who sacked in particular the abbeys and churches where they found the greatest riches – in Vicenza the monasteries of Santi Felice and Fortunato and those of San Vito and San Salvatore were destroyed – the bishops took on a new role, that of defending the cities and rural communities, and in this they were encouraged by the emperors, who authorized them to build castles and granted them privileges and jurisdictions.

Thus during the 10th and 11th centuries and until the middle of the 12th, the bishops of Vicenza were simultaneously lords of the city, heads of the diocesan ecclesiastical organization and religious leaders of the Christian people. It was the former aspect, moreover – this is evident from documents of the time that record their acts as feudal lords or arbitrators of disputes – that most characterized their figure, to the detriment of their pastoral function.

==== The privileges of the cathedral canons ====
The canons of the cathedral, in turn, were owners of many urban chapels, which in 1186 numbered at least 10 and extra-urban churches. Such extensive possessions and rights, with their attendant economic implications and the disputes that followed, often overshadowed their main task, that of being the bishop's assistants for pastoral functions.

==== Clergy and religious life ====
The general degradation of religious life was aggravated by the problem of the clergy's profound ignorance and the laxity of their customs: simony and concubinage were quite common, and attempts at reform and moralization, pursued as early as around the year 1000 by some of the more enlightened and committed bishops – such as Rudolph who tried to reform the clergy by implementing the decisions of the Council of Ravenna ordered by Otto I in 967, Lambert who introduced community life for cathedral priests and Jerome – and then by the papacy and various councils, especially after the Gregorian reform, had little success in Vicenza, as generally throughout northern Italy.

A close witness to Vicenza is that of the bishop of Verona Ratherius, who in his writings denounced the vices that united priests and laity: extreme ignorance, gluttony, superstition, dissolute customs.

As for the type of religiosity, in Vicenza during the early Middle Ages clergy and laity were very attached to traditional forms and seemed not to perceive the new demands of spirituality, which were also being felt in other parts of Italy.

== 12th-14th Centuries: The Dark Ages ==
=== A different religiosity ===
Beginning in the 12th century in north-central Italy there were significant changes in city life that affected the religious sphere. Free communes emerged which freed themselves from the lordship of the bishops, a new social class, the bourgeoisie, was formed, which due to the needs of travel and trade had the opportunity to meet other cultures and claimed greater freedom of thought, including in matters of faith.

Thus the ideal life model for the Christian changed, which was no longer that of the monk who withdrew from the world to build the civitas Dei, but that of the man who accepted the world in order to understand and transform it. Latin, which by then had become incomprehensible to the majority of people, was increasingly relegated to the juridical and ecclesiastical sphere, and this fact, while distancing people from rituals, which were also increasingly unintelligible, gave rise to new needs.

Compared to previous centuries, popular religiosity found different forms to express itself, endowed with greater interiority. Putting on the back burner the iconography of Byzantine origin that equated Christ with a king, the crucifix – particularly cherished by the Franciscans – was now placed in churches, and people meditated on Jesus as a man and a sufferer. The figure of woman was being revalued, along with that of Mary, elaborated by the spirituality of Bernard of Clairvaux, who took on the guise of the gentle mother and ideal woman.

More or less orthodox movements arose everywhere, whose point of reference was the model of the early church, as it was described in the Scriptures, whose translation into the vernacular was desired. In some cases they found the answer in forms of community life, such as the Humiliati and the Waldensians, who practiced simplicity of life, the pooling of goods, prayer, and listening to and preaching the word of God. Others, on the other hand, manifested, sometimes in violent forms such as the Pataria, their dissent from the growing power, including temporal power, of the pope and bishops and their lifestyle, which was considered to have strayed too far from evangelical poverty.

It was the favorable environment for the rapid expansion of the Mendicant Orders. The friars, trained in the study of their sacred texts and capable of expressing their contents in a concrete everyday language appropriate to daily life, exhorted the public to repent and convert.

=== The role of bishops in Vicenza ===
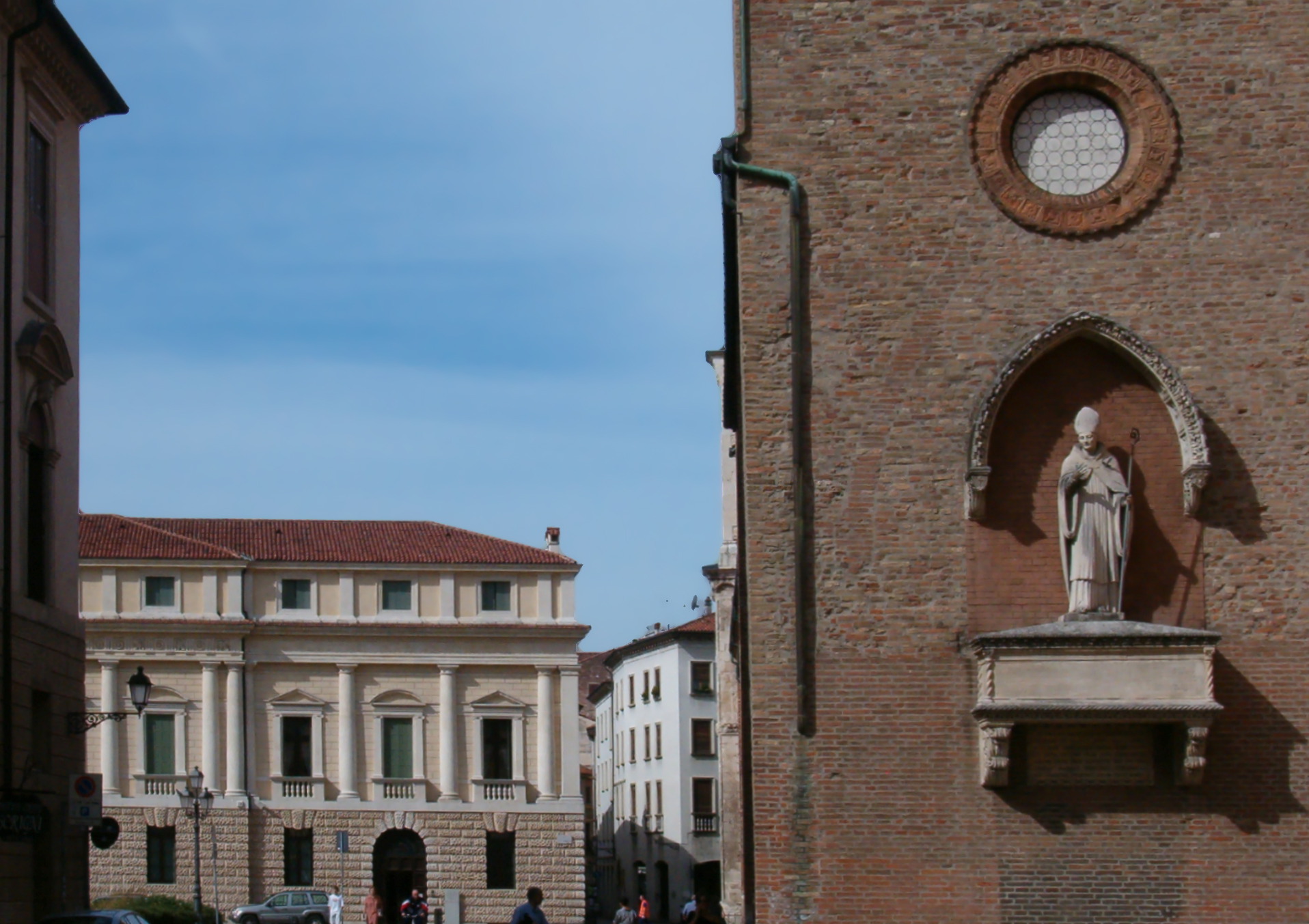
Statue (right) of Bishop Giovanni Cacciafronte, killed in 1184 by a conspiracy of nobles, outside the apse of the Cathedral of Santa Maria Annunciata (originally the statue was placed in its own aedicule).

As long as the alliance and harmony between the bishop and the emperor lasted, the ecclesiastical organization seemed solid. But after Bishop Henry in 1122 – and his successors after him – approached the papacy, which was fighting the empire over the question of investiture, their power over the city declined rapidly. The party opposed to them, headed by the count, was formed; around 1140 the commune was formed, which in a few years freed itself from their tutelage. The bishops were fought, robbed unscrupulously and sometimes even killed – as happened to Cacciafronte and Pistore – by their opponents, if not by their own vassals. Strangled by debts, bishops and canons fell into the hands of usurers. In a 1213 letter, Pope Innocent III called the Vicenza Church "a ship in pieces."

=== Lay fraternities ===
The bishops, therefore, failed to use the transitional period to renew church life and reform the customs of the clergy. The evangelical revival arose from below, though approved by the Church, at least in the beginning.

Toward the end of the 12th century, fraternities of lay people sprang up in the Vicenza area who practiced community life, supported themselves by their labor and often ran xenodochia or small hospices. To accomplish this, they requested and obtained in concession chapels and buildings abandoned by the Benedictine monks when the latter, few in number, returned to live in the monastery of San Felice.

The earliest known document concerns the hospice of Lisiera, where in 1134 a community of fratres et conversi was invested by the abbot of St. Felix – to whom they owed obedience – with a considerable extension of land located between Bertesina and Monticello Conte Otto; a second document from 1181 attests that along with them lived a priest and clerics, and that they ran a hospice, devoting themselves to the assistance of pilgrims passing along the Via Postumia; they ceased to exist towards the second half of the thirteenth century.

In 1183 Bishop Pistore granted to another community of laymen the church of San Nicolò di Nunto (today Olmo di Creazzo), abandoned by the clergy because it yielded too little.

Five years later, the canons of the cathedral entrusted another fraternity of married laymen, dedicated to communal life, poverty and penance, with the church of St. Desiderius (today St. Augustine), neglected for the same reason, along with the adjoining estates; as a rule of life they chose the Augustinian one. Nothing else is known about this community, but in 1236 the canons and canonesses of St. Mark of Mantua, who resided in the monastery of St. Bartholomew in Borgo Pusterla in Vicenza, received from Bishop Manfredo dei Pii – who also dissolved the community of St. Nicholas of Olmo – the investiture of the church with all its privileges and annexed possessions.

Again, around the 1390s a group of men and women withdrew to communal life at the formerly Benedictine church of San Biagio Vecchio and founded a hospice there. They lived in practice the Benedictine rule, which, however, Bishop Altegrado in 1307 imposed on them by decree, reproving the lifestyle that had been established in the community. From that time on, although all property and rents remained in the community, it could only consist of women, while four monks, two of them priests, had to live there but separate from the female community. By the end of the century the number of nuns was very small and the hospice had ceased to function.

In Vicenza, a domus Patarinorum, i.e., a community of Humiliati was settled in Borgo Berga just outside the early medieval city walls in the spring of 1190, that is, at a time when this movement had been excommunicated by Pope Lucius III with the bull Ad abolendam, promulgated at the synod of Verona in 1184, which lumped it in with the Cathars and Patarians.

The settlement became established in the district and indeed – the readmission of the movement back into the sphere of the Church having occurred with the obligation to follow a very precise rule – in 1215 founded the convent of All Saints, where the Humiliati remained until the dissolution of the Order by Napoleon.

In 1292 the Humiliati at a second house of theirs, the one called de medio, built the church of St. Catherine.

Within a few years of their establishment, therefore, all these communities of lay people, either because they were considered dangerous to orthodoxy or criticized for their lifestyle, were either dissolved or regularized – that is, a very precise rule was imposed on them, approved by the Church, which involved in particular the clear separation of men and women.

=== Heresies and repression ===
However, there were also forms of dissent that sought to create an alternative church. Already by the end of the 12th century Vicenza had become an important center of the Cathars. In the early 13th century, a chronicler said that Vicenza was full of heretics.

In 1184 Lucius III issued in Verona the decretal Ad abolendam diversarum haeresium pravitatem – by which a whole series of dissent movements, considered heretical, were excommunicated and inquisitorial proceedings were instituted against them, the management of which was entrusted to the bishops. Yet for a few more decades, in Vicenza as in much of northern Italy, repression was rather weak, for several reasons.

First of all, at that time dogmatic definitions were not so clear-cut and indeed the movements that criticized or aimed at reforming the Church all affirmed their conformity to the Gospel and their adherents called themselves good Christians.

Secondly, for repression to be effective, the religious authority would have had to enlist the cooperation of the civil authority, but the city bodies – in difficult times of factional strife or against the emperor – did not want to antagonize dissenters, often members of culturally good seigniorial families or merchants who, by traveling, had come into contact with different ideas and different forms of spirituality.

Religious affiliation itself was influenced by the choice of sides between Guelphs and Ghibellines. The aristocracy of Vicenza was largely Ghibelline, and so was Ezzelino III da Romano, lord of the city from 1237 to 1259; but some bishops also sympathized with the emperor: still in 1239 there is the episode of inaction on the part of Bishop Manfredo de' Pii against Frederick II who, despite the excommunication imposed on him by the pope, had entered the cathedral during the celebration of mass.

Repressive action became much more incisive and effective under the pontificate of Innocent III, who, among other things, with the decretal Vergentis in senium of 1199 qualified heresy as a crime of lese-majesty, that is, a crime that subverted the social order and therefore had to be repressed by civil authority. Heretics were to be deprived of all civil and political rights and their property confiscated. Finally, with Gregory IX in 1233, the condemnation to burning at the stake for unrepentant heretics was established and the tribunals of the Inquisition were set up, taken away from the bishops and entrusted to the friars of the Mendicant Orders, who were directly dependent on the pope.

==== The Cathar Church of Vicenza ====
At the beginning of the 13th century the Cathar Church numbered in Vicenza and Bassano about 100 Perfects (which means that the simple believers and sympathizers were many more), practiced a dualism typical of Sclavonia, where its bishop Nicholas of Vicenza had stayed and was consecrated; he was succeeded in 1214-1215 by his 'eldest son,' the Vicenza nobleman Pietro Gallo.

This Church received an initial blow during the brief campaign of preaching and persecution by Giovanni da Schio in 1233, who succeeded in having 60 heretics sent to the stake. It grew stronger, however, during the rule of Ezzelino III, so much so that he was accused – one of the pope's reasons for the call of the crusade against him – of being a heretic and a protector of heretics, but it was nearly eradicated by the time of Bishop Bartholomew of Breganze who confronted the Cathars in public debates, succeeding in converting many of them – including the Cathar archbishop Geremia of the entire March and perhaps Bishop Viviano Boglo – and sending another dozen to the stake, including the deacons Olderico de Marola and Tolomeo.

Later, the decisive actions that extinguished the Cathar Church in Vicenza altogether were the activities of the local Inquisition during the period of subjugation to Padua and the political and military activities of the Guelph lordships. In 1276 the brothers Mastino and Alberto della Scala conquered with their troops the fortress of Sirmione, where numerous Perfects had barricaded themselves together with the Cathar bishops of Desenzano and Bagnolo San Vito; the prisoners were taken to Verona where 166 of them were burned on February 13, 1278, with the addition of another forty or so dissidents.

==== The Inquisition in the 13th century ====
The inefficiency in suppressing heresy had prompted Pope Gregory IX to repeatedly send cardinals as papal legates to Italy to urge religious and civil authorities to take action against the Cathars. Since this problem present throughout the empire could not be solved, the pope eventually relied on the Mendicant Orders, which depended not on the bishops but directly on him, to combat dissent, equipping them with appropriate coercive tools.

In the March of Verona the inquisitorial office was initially held by the Dominicans and in 1254 passed to the Friars Minor, who exercised it until 1308 when, following two severe papal inquiries against them, it returned to the Dominicans. Almost certainly there was also in Vicenza a stable office and probably a vicar inquisitor – a post that often foreshadowed that of full office – who took care of the administration of confiscated property, received the confessions of heretics and performed other functions as well.

According to the regulations of the time, the expenses for the investigation and trial had to be covered by the inquisitor, and for this reason, among the punishments imposed were numerous pecuniary penalties and confiscations of property of deceased heretics, while capital executions and prison sentences were very rare. Especially at the end of the thirteenth century there were many posthumous trials in the city against rich and powerful families, during the period when Paduan friars, appointed by the provincial minister Bartolomeo Mascara of Padua (1289 – 1299), were inquisitors, who unduly spent a part of the income for personal uses and favors to relatives.

In the two severe papal inquiries of 1302 and 1308 the special judges sent by Boniface VIII and Clement V collected abundant data on economic management, preserved in Rome in the Collectoriae of the Vatican Apostolic Archive, while the records of the trials held in the local offices almost all disappeared over the centuries. For this reason, the confiscations and sales of heretics' property made by these inquisitors are better known than their actual trial activity.

The first inquisition, entrusted by Boniface VIII on June 12, 1302, to Guido di Neuville, bishop of Saintes, concerning six Franciscan inquisitors from the province of Veneto, was prompted by the denunciation of the bishop of Padua and the ambassadors of the Commune. Friar Boninsegna of Trent and Friar Pietrobuono of Padua were imprisoned, the others suspended. The data collected showed, among other things, that Friar Boninsegna had collected in 1300-1301 in Vicenza 25,524 lire of revenue (equal to 7,900 gold florins) and had paid only 1,000 lire to the Commune. The pope then assigned the office of Padua and Vicenza to the Dominicans; from the few remaining acts, it is known that Friar Boninsegna was ordered to pay 250 gold florins to the Apostolic Camera.

Although the inquisitors of Paduan origin were accused by their victims and censured by the pope, it seems that at the time they were well accepted by their contemporaries, who even in the period of recurrent embezzlement continued to leave them donations in wills, to collaborate with them at the institutional level, and sometimes even defended them against well-founded accusations of administrative abuses. The municipality of Vicenza itself, at that time practically subservient to Padua, was cooperative and allocated a third of the proceeds of the confiscated property to the construction of the imposing Franciscan church of San Lorenzo.

=== The Mendicant Orders ===
In the first decades of the thirteenth century, the Mendicant Orders spread with extreme rapidity throughout the major cities of Italy and beyond the Alps. Unlike the monks, the friars did not reside in monasteries, but built large convents well embedded in the urban fabric and moved from one to the other; they did not isolate themselves from the world but lived among the people, whether the common people or the new bourgeoisie. They often curried favor with the powerful, but did not depend on them for land grants. They were more educated and prepared for preaching than the diocesan clergy, with whom they often came into conflict. Freed from obedience to the bishop who was considered inefficient, they were the new force at the pope's disposal to fight the heretics, whom not even the crusades waged against them had succeeded in annihilating.

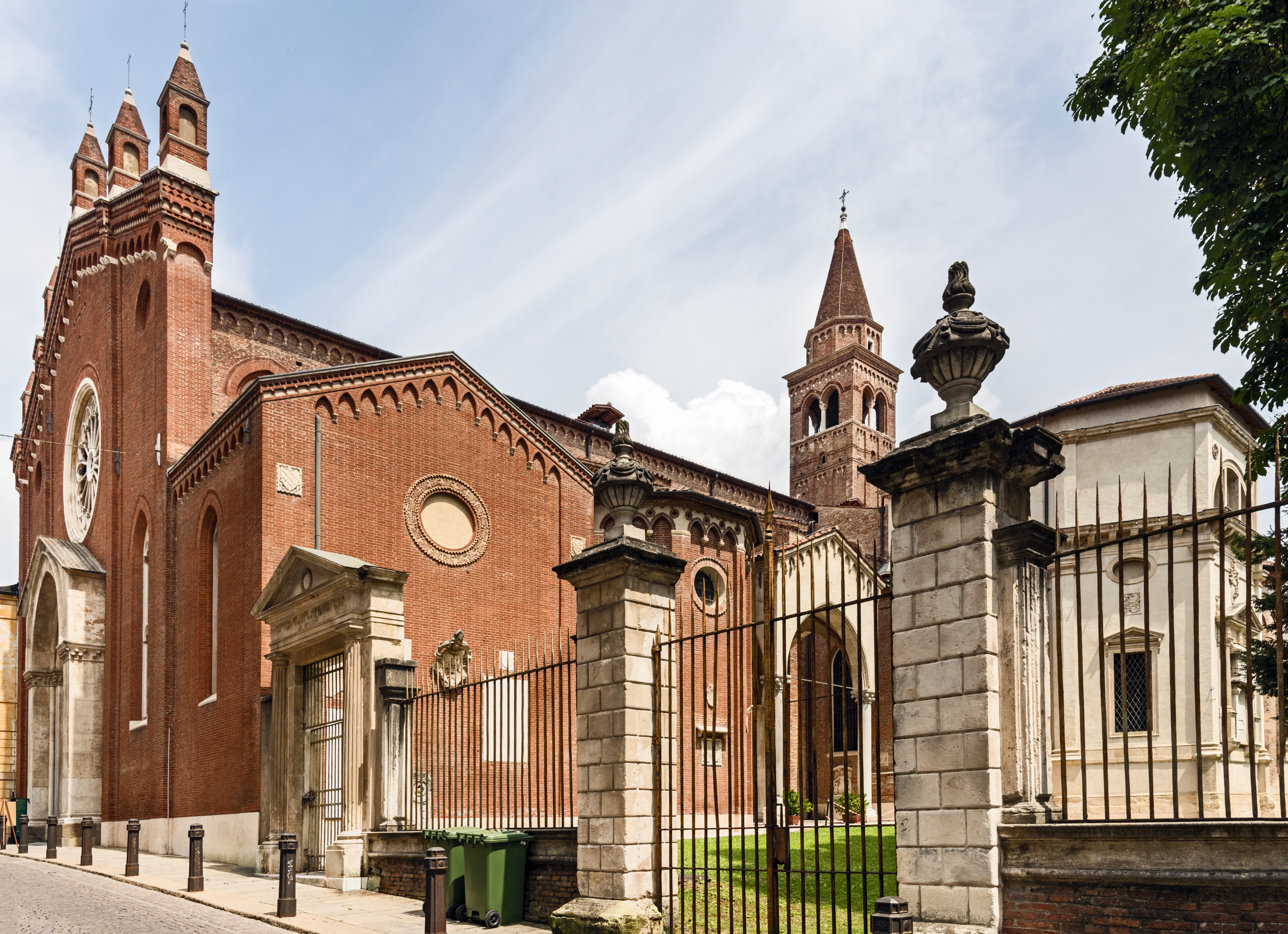
The church of Santa Corona, erected to preserve the relics that Louis IX of France gave to Bishop Bartholomew of Breganze.

They also broke into Vicenza, a city in which at the beginning of the century the bishop had been severely downsized both in his temporal power and as a religious authority, the secular and religious clergy were uncultured and worldly in customs, a city in which the strong Cathar Church was present with its own bishop and a good number of adherents even among the emerging classes.

They distributed themselves in the city by areas of expertise, so as not to interfere with each other in preaching and collecting alms, using the natural division into neighborhoods determined by the main decumanus and cardo. The Franciscans, present in Vicenza since the 1220s, took root in the northwest quadrant, where in 1280 they began construction of the Temple of San Lorenzo; the Dominicans built the church of Santa Corona in the northeast quadrant; the Augustinians erected in 1264 the church of San Michele, demolished in 1812, across the Retrone River in the southeast sector, while the southwest quarter remained under the jurisdiction of the cathedral chapter.

Each had a period of greater influence on city life. The Dominicans in the 30s – the heyday of Giovanni da Schio is recalled – and especially in the five-year period following the fall of Ezzelino III, when they were strongly supported by their confrere, Bishop Bartholomew of Breganze, but also by the municipality, which purchased the area for the construction of Santa Corona. The Franciscans were favored during the fifty-year period of Paduan hegemony, and they were entrusted with the offices of the city's Inquisition. Finally, the Augustinians, well regarded by the Scaligeri, established themselves in the period of the Veronese seigniory.

=== The decay of the fourteenth century ===
The fourteenth century was a century of decadence for both the Christian Church and the local churches. The popes abandoned Rome for Avignon, where they settled during the seventy years of the so-called Avignon Captivity, and there the papacy increasingly adapted to the logic of court life and political connivance with the new European states. The dioceses were left to their fate, and the process of church reform favored in the thirteenth century by the previous popes, who had benefited from the strong contribution of the mendicant orders, was interrupted.

The bishops of Vicenza were also men of their time: often elected under pressure if not actually appointed by the ruling dynasties, first the Scaligeri and then the Visconti, continually involved in the struggles between the seigniories that contended for the territory as well as between them and the papacy, they were also often opposed by the city factions and the cathedral chapter itself.

For many bishops of the 14th century, their presence in the city was sporadic, sometimes because they were prevented by the lord of the time, at other times – particularly in the second half of the century – because they were absorbed by other interests. Men often of high culture, they devoted themselves to university teaching or were commissioned by the pope to carry out diplomatic missions.

At the same time, the degradation of ecclesiastical organization continued and indeed became more pronounced. The situation can be gleaned from the acts of the diocesan synod that Bishop Sperandio convened around 1320: the synod determinations make it clear that the parish priests frequented taverns where they were given over to gambling and wine, carried weapons and committed crimes, did not keep their church in order, and above all did not reside in the parish of which they were incumbents. This last aspect – also emphasized by a later synod of 1349-1357 – reveals how ownership of a parish or curacy of a church was considered nothing more than a benefit to be exploited for the income it produced.

=== The patron saints of Vicenza ===
During the 14th and 15th centuries in Vicenza, as in other cities in the Veneto region, there was a resurgence of devotion to local patron saints and their worship became established. This was the period when the city and its territory, as, moreover, many other parts of Europe, were devastated by famine and pestilence; the population felt the need to rely on the protection of patron saints to intercede with God.

According to some authors, it was also the time when Vicenza – which by then had lost all political autonomy, first under the rule of the Scaligeri and Visconti families, then with its dedication to the Serenissima – built its own identity, exalting with a whole series of rituals and devotions the saints it considered to be typically local. An identity that the city's noble families asserted strongly, often taking the initiative to finance and have chapels, altars and sacred furnishings built in the city's churches.

==== Mary, Mother of Jesus ====
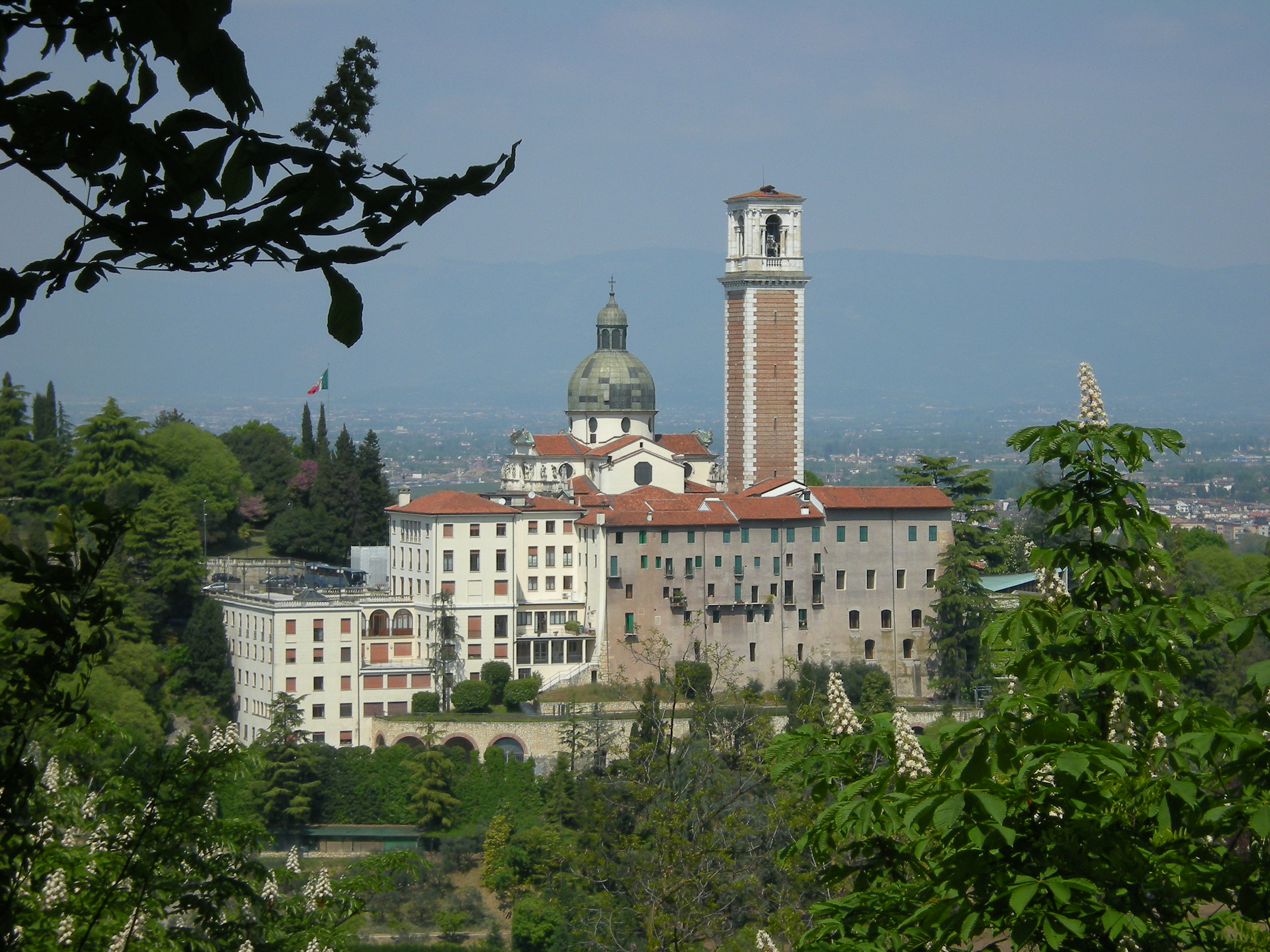
The present sanctuary complex of the Madonna di Monte Berico

Marian worship is very ancient in Vicenza: both the dedication of the church, later the cathedral, to the Virgin Annunciate and that of the martyrion of the basilica of San Felice alla Mater Domini date from the fifth century. In the following centuries, the titular of the cathedral also became the titular of many parish churches in the area.

As is obvious, this cult experienced alternating periods of greater vigor and others of weariness, of more spiritual devotion alternating with others of more formal veneration.

Formed probably within the renewed Cistercian spirituality, Bartholomew of Breganze fostered the rebirth of the Marian cult in Vicenza; he placed under the protection of Mater misericordiae the Congregationes Mariae – to which he alludes in his writings – which, about two centuries later became the Company of Mercy, which became common throughout Italy, following the example of the one founded by Antoninus of Florence. A good testimony to this devotion, in the 15th century, is given by the action of the Vicenza knight Giampietro de Proti; he, establishing the hospice of Santa Maria della Misericordia in favor of fallen Vicenza nobles, arranged in his will that the brotherhood of the same name should make an altarpiece for the hospice's oratory: the depiction of the Virgin, in it, corresponds to that which the sculptor Nicolò da Venezia would later create for the Madonna of Monte Berico.

During the first half of the 15th century, town confraternities named after her spread: their devotional forms are unknown – probably related to the penance movement – but they were supposed to consist of thanksgiving for the narrow escape from danger, especially from recurring famines and pestilences, and deeds of mercy toward one's neighbor. This was the period when the church of St. Mary of Mercy at the end of Biade Square and a chapel in the cathedral where the confraternity of Sancta Mariae Pietatis had its headquarters were also established.

The main reason for the revival of Marian piety in Vicenza, however, is undoubtedly linked to the two apparitions of Our Lady to Vincenza Pasini in 1426 and 1428, years when a severe plague epidemic was raging. In her apparition, Our Lady asked for the construction of a shrine, which, after the second apparition, was built in just three months and became the focus of the city's Marian devotion.

A new strong impetus was given in the second half of the sixteenth century by the pastoral action of the Catholic Church, which, after the Council of Trent, in contrast to the Protestants endeavored to spread and revalue in new forms the cult to the Virgin.

==== Leontius and Carpophorus, Euphemia and Innocence ====
According to Vicenza historian Francesco Barbarano, the four titular saints of the cathedral – along with the Virgin Annunciate – namely Euphemia, Innocence, Leontius and Carpophorus, were four brothers from Vicenza who suffered martyrdom in the fourth century. In fact, the cult of the two saints came to Vicenza from Aquileia, while it is difficult to know, in the state of the records, whether the cult of Leontius and Carpophorus is rooted in history or legend.

A twelfth-century chronicler states that in 970 Theodoric, bishop of Metz, received from the Vicentine bishop Rudolph – in exchange for intercession with the emperor – the bodies of Saints Leontius and Carpophorus; these were said to have been martyred in Rome and their bodies transferred to Vicenza not long before 969, placed at first in the monastery of San Felice and then, after it had been plundered and burned by the Hungarians, moved to the cathedral. The Vicentines also reportedly told the bishop that the passio of the two saints, believed to be Arab doctors, had been lost in a fire. The news is not certain, and few references in the tradition might suggest a splitting of the far more certain figures of the Roman anargyri saints, Cosmas and Damian.

What is certain, however, is that the cult of these two saints in Vicenza began after the 14th century. The 15th-century chronicle states that on August 10, 1455, their bodies were found in the cathedral and ten days later brought in a solemn procession attended by thousands of people, including from neighboring towns, during which a large offering of money was collected.

Then in 1482, after the demolition of the cathedral's main chapel, the bodies of the martyrs Euphemia and Innocence were also brought to light. At the same time the body of Bishop Giovanni Cacciafronte, buried after his violent death in 1184, was also exposed for worship.

==== Vincent ====
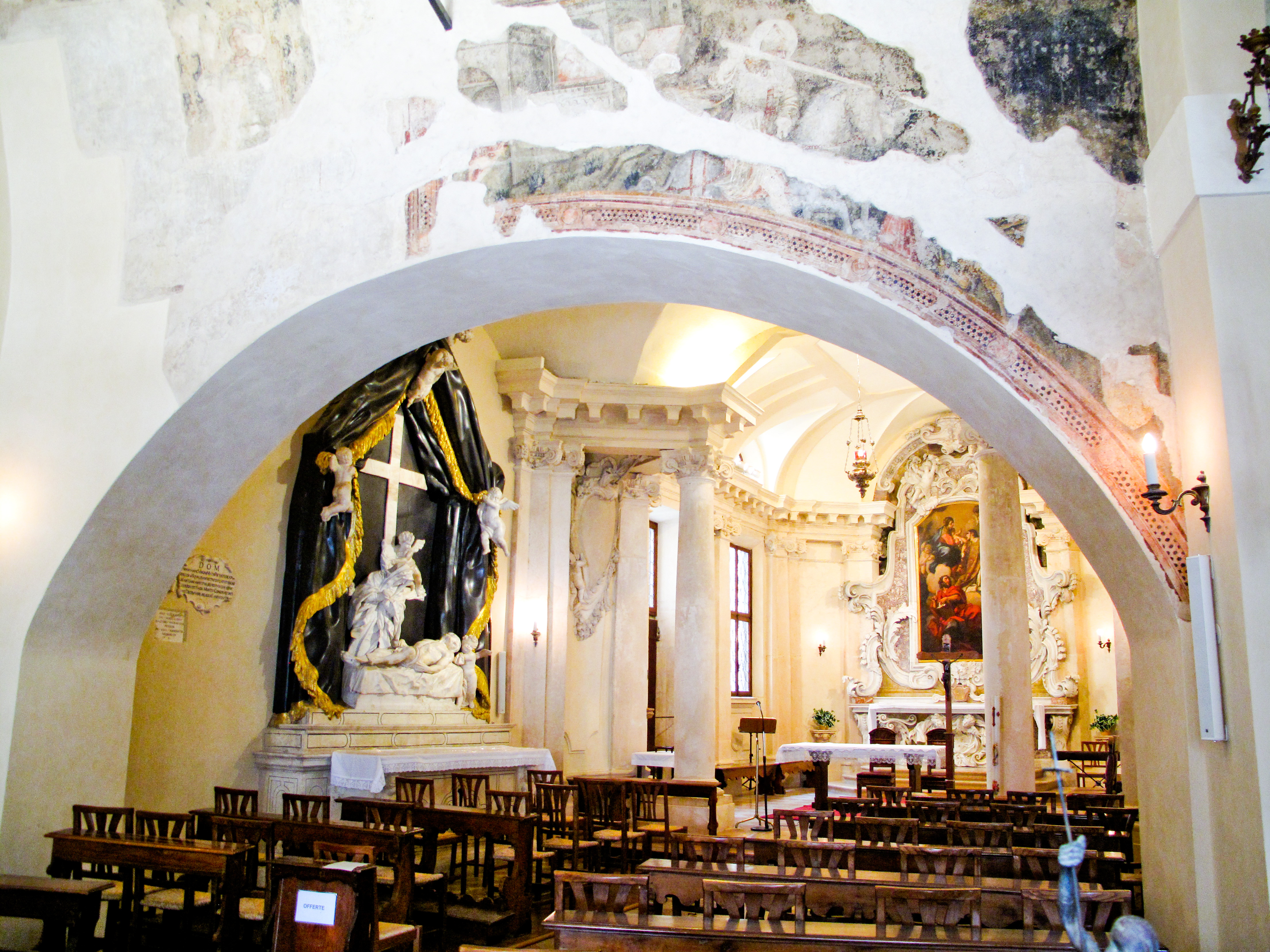
Interior of the Church of St. Vincent

In the second half of the 14th century, during the Scaliger seigniory, the cult and patronage of St. Vincent of Saragossa took on a new vigor, so much so that in 1385 the construction of a new church leaning against the inside of the Peronio wall in the city's platea magna began, a construction that was completed in 1387, the year the Visconti took over the city's rule. The following year the Council of Five Hundred resolved that the Corpus Christi procession should take place from the Cathedral to the Church of St. Vincent, at this point the official patron saint of the city.

=== The devotional and charitable guilds ===
In addition to the trade guilds there were others with devotional, mutualistic or charitable intentions. Originating from the penitential movement of 1260, the Fraglia dei Battuti had sprung up in Vicenza, to which both commoners and lords of the Vicenza nobility belonged. Soon it was divided into the Fraglia dei Battuti di San Marcello – who ran the Ospitale dei Santi Maria e Cristoforo and took the name of Rossi from the color of the robe they wore – and that of the Battuti di Sant'Antonio abate – named after the existing hospice in the Piazza del Duomo and who took the name of Negroni.

Throughout the fourteenth and fifteenth centuries these guilds multiplied, for the purpose of managing works of charity: the Ospitale of Santa Maria della Misericordia, that of Santi Ambrogio e Bellino, that of Santa Croce, and that of Santi Pietro e Paolo. Many other guilds were scattered throughout Vicenza's territory.

Other guilds, however, were more typically devotional. As far as records show, during the fourteenth century the Fraglia dei Battuti di Santa Maria in Berga (called San Silvestro or Santa Maria del Borgo Berga) and that, located near the church of San Lorenzo, of Santa Maria della Concezione were formed, which, after the canonization of St. Bernardino of Siena, merged with a new one to become the confraternity of Santa Maria and San Bernardino. A particular cult to the Virgin was specific to the Fratalea Pietatis, attached to the chapel of the Incoronata in the cathedral. A Marian confraternity was also established at the church of Santa Maria dei Servi from the early 15th century.

== 15th-18th centuries: The age of the Venetian Republic ==
=== 15th and first half of the 16th century ===
==== Venetian bishops and apostolic administrators ====
With the pact of devotion to Venice, in 1404, the people of Vicenza agreed that their bishop would be required to reside in the city; Giovanni da Castiglione – a highly educated person and juris utriusque doctor, elected in 1390 but who until then had preferred to reside in Pavia, where he taught canon law at the university, and in Verona – complied with the agreement.

The presence of bishops in the city, however, was effective only during the first half of the 15th century, with Pietro Emiliani (1409 – 1433) and Francesco Malipiero (1433 – 1451). Starting in 1451, however, most bishops lived outside Vicenza and entrusted the government of the diocese to vicars-general. This was done, for example, by Pietro Barbo (1451 – 1464), who was later elected pope with the name Paul II and appointed first his relative Marco Barbo (1464 – 1470) and then his nephew Giovanni Battista Zeno (1470 – 1501) as bishops of Vicenza; the latter – who was the commissioner of the beautiful loggia of the bishop's palace – resided in the city for only a couple of years out of thirty of his episcopate.

The real difference, compared to previous centuries, was the alliance between the political and religious apparatuses, which favored stability of government in both the city and the diocese. This was a system that had become well-established in Venice where, since 1363, the Venetian Senate had been responsible for signaling candidates for ecclesiastical benefices to the Roman Curia; although it was not always accommodated, 80 percent of the bishops of the mainland dioceses between 1400 and 1550 were chosen from members of the patrician families of the Dominant.

Instead, the 16th century opened with a long series of apostolic administrators appointed directly by the Holy See, usually members of powerful Roman families such as the Della Rovere, who had begun their rise with the election of Sixtus IV in 1471. This was the time of the conflict between the papacy and the Serenissima, when Pope Julius II led the League of Cambrai against Venice. This system lasted until 1565, when the Tridentine decrees, which established the obligation of residency, began to be implemented.

==== Religious life and ecclesiastical organization in the 15th and 16th centuries ====
In the first half of the 15th century, during the period of the resident bishops, there was some renewal of religious life, although not at all levels.

Popular piety was fueled by some special events during the episcopate of Pietro Emiliani: the apparition of Mary to Vincenza Pasini, which was perceived as a special protection of Our Lady over the city, the discovery of the bodies of Saints Felix and Fortunatus, and the preaching of Bernardino of Siena.

His successor, Francesco Malipiero, engaged in the reform of the regular clergy – which was reduced to a minimum both due to the scarcity of vocations and the laxity of customs – favoring the settlement of religious men and women from outside and imposing the rule of observance on existing monasteries and convents.

On the other hand, the two bishops did not change the parish system and instead continued to distribute benefices to priests mostly from outside the diocese: according to Domenico Bortolan out of 500 priests who governed parishes at that time just one-seventh were from Vicenza, while a good fifth came from Germany. Often several benefices pertaining to even distant parishes and churches were assigned to the same person who, naturally, did not exercise the cure of souls on the spot.

Instead, the exercise of liturgical functions and pastoral activity was entrusted to secular clergy with a very low level of cultural and doctrinal knowledge: in the reports drawn up following the pastoral visits of the vicars general in the second half of the 15th century, it is stated that few priests were able to read, few knew the formulas of the consecration of the Mass, very few knew how to recite the simplest prayers such as the Pater noster or had clear ideas about confession and the concept of sin. As for lifestyle, nothing had changed from the degradation of customs observed in the 14th century; the clergy participated – with the exception of a few significant exceptions of virtuous priests – in the conditions of abjectness in which the population lived: brawling, violence, the practice of cohabitation and concubinage.

The elements that constitute the religious life of that period – that is, from the beginning of the fifteenth century to the implementation of the decrees of the Council of Trent in the second half of the sixteenth century – can thus be summarized as follows:

- a medieval worldview that was not questioned: the order of the world came from God; both secular and ecclesiastical authorities had the task of implementing it. The symbiosis and complementarity between the two powers would not be questioned, in Vicenza as throughout the Republic
- the expression of faith was outward and collective: authorities, aristocracy, and people participated en masse in religious ceremonies, and even civil ceremonies always had a religious character. On the other hand, knowledge of the contents of the faith was scarce in the faithful as well as in the lower clergy, as was knowledge of the Scriptures
- a popular pietas was widespread based on the worship of saints, seen as intercessory patrons and thaumaturges for individual and collective salvation, of soul and body. In the countryside, religiosity was very much linked to natural cycles and agricultural production
- control over the behavior of the faithful was very tight: parish priests' reports had to mention the number of those who went to confession, took communion or were concubines. Conversely, control over the behavior of high and low clergy was almost nonexistent
- monks and friars were, far more than the parish clergy, the reference points of popular religiosity: they were the only ones who knew the Scriptures and were able to preach. A few episodes of renewal aside, monasteries and convents also suffered from the general climate of relaxed customs and tended to empty out
- after the destruction of the Cathar Church in the early fourteenth century and until the Protestant Reformation, no movements of religious dissent or even of concrete contestation with the Church are known in Vicenza.

==== Protestant movements in Vicenza ====
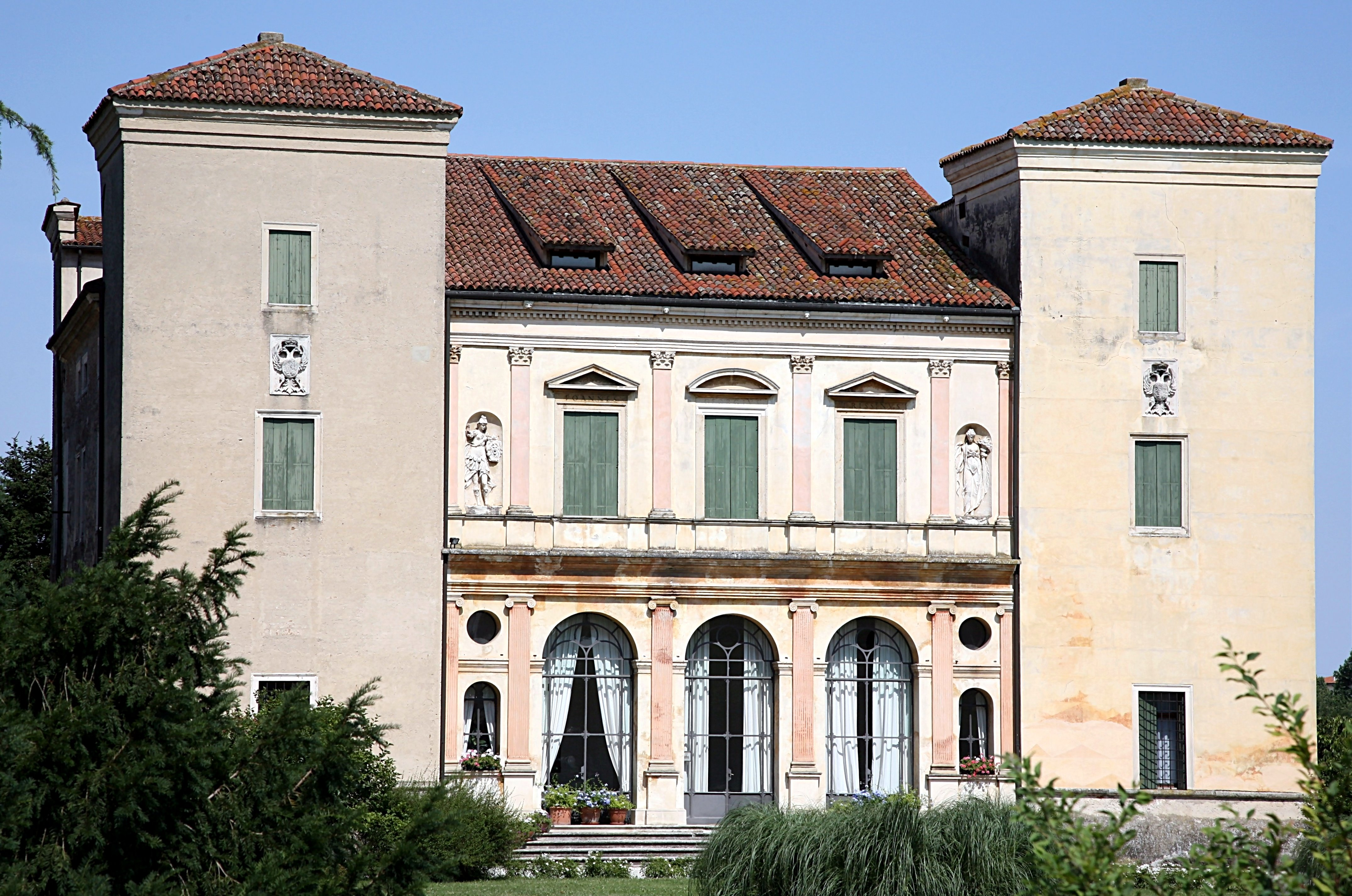
Villa Trissino in Cricoli, one of the meeting places for members of the pro-German noble families who were influenced by the ideas of the Protestant Reformation.

In the second quarter of the 16th century the ideas of the Protestant Reformation – coming mainly from the German and Swiss areas – spread fairly rapidly to Vicenza as well, where they found many willing to embrace them, impatient with ecclesiastical behavior and sincerely desirous of reform in an evangelical sense. The spread of these ideas affected different social strata depending on the channels it followed and the different sensibilities it encountered.

Thus on the pro-German noble families the Lutheran denomination had a greater influence, while the city bourgeoisie was more sensitive to Zwinglian Calvinism. For a time, however, these two components found themselves together, participating in companies – or private academies – that often met in Pigafetta's house or in the Trissino villa at Cricoli. Several times it was reported in Venice and Rome that adherences to Protestantism were growing steadily – hundreds of adherents were spoken of – during the episcopate of Niccolò Ridolfi, who, moreover, was always absent from the city.

In spite of the denunciations, the inquisition proceedings were late and the repression very mild, so that practically all members of the upper classes were able to leave, taking their capital with them. Venice, which had considerable trade interests with Germany, did not want to displease the transalpine princes too much by hurting their religious feelings. Among the outcasts were Calvinists Giovan Battista Trento, who settled in Geneva, Alessandro Trissino, and Odoardo Thiene. The Calvinist movement in Vicenza, both of the exiles and those who had remained in their homeland, soon enough exhausted itself in indifferentism or religious conformity.

Far stronger and more radical, however, was the Anabaptist movement. Brought by rebellious Trentino-Tyrolean peasants who, having fled in 1526, had taken refuge mainly in the area of Bassano and Cittadella, Anabaptism spread mainly among the city's artisans. It had social and communal connotations, modeled after the Hutterite Brethren, who in Moravia practiced communalism of both production and consumption goods on a voluntary basis. The Anabaptists were organized into study groups or cenacles, which, however, were disturbed by doctrinal differences: the prevailing approach, agreed upon in the synod of Venice in 1550, reached antitrinitarian conclusions, with the denial of Christ's divinity. This approach opened the door to the denial of any dogma and even the hitherto accepted community rules.

The Vicenza community was betrayed in 1551 by Pietro Manelfi, a repentant Anabaptist who – in order to seize the opportunity of the amnesty promised by a papal bull – decided to turn himself in and reveal the names and organization of the brethren. Of these, some were caught, others spontaneously turned themselves in, and still others fled across the Alps and then to Moravia, where they reconstituted communities. At the request of the Venetian Inquisition to the Council of Ten in 1565, two of them who stubbornly refused to abjure were sentenced to death by drowning in the lagoon. The Anabaptist community in Vicenza was not completely destroyed, but continued for some years in hiding, with a direction close to the religious enlightenment of Lelio Sozzini and Matteo Gribaldi.

=== From the second half of the 16th century to the end of the 18th century ===
==== The implementation of the Tridentine decrees ====
By the time the Council of Trent ended, the Church in Vicenza was in a pitiful state of neglect. With very rare exceptions and contrary to the terms of the pact of devotion, bishops had been non-residents for over a century: always welcomed upon their installation in the diocese by cheering crowds and the municipality at great expense, they did not reside in the city – viewing their appointment as a transitory moment in their diplomatic or cardinal's career within the Church – and were represented by vicars.

The government of the diocese was actually in the hands of the very powerful cathedral chapter whose members, the canons, were chosen from among the city's leading aristocratic families and accumulated benefits, derived from the ownership of both city churches and the most important extra-urban parishes.

On the other hand, the monasteries and convents, which were in a state of material and moral decay and had few religious, but still possessed substantial assets, far exceeding those of the diocesan Church, were completely autonomous from the diocese, because they depended directly on the Holy See.

This was the scene at the time when the Tridentine decrees were sent to Vicenza, on July 22, 1564, along with the order to implement them immediately, and at the same time Matteo Priuli, who had participated since 1562 in the Council sessions and made his entrance into the city on September 3 of the following year, was appointed bishop of Vicenza.

He tackled with great energy the reform of the Church and, first and foremost, the obligation for those who enjoyed ecclesiastical benefices to reside in the place of tenure and the prohibition of accumulating multiple benefices. His action, however, which threatened strong and well-established interests – in particular those of the canons of the cathedral, led by Archdeacon Simone da Porto, and those of the monasteries – met with strenuous resistance and even rebellion; canons and religious appealed to the Holy See, taking advantage of their support at the Roman curia, so that the bishop's decrees did not find implementation.

In 1579 Matteo Priuli, disappointed, renounced the diocese to retire to private life in his native Venice, and was succeeded in the office by his nephew Michele. The latter, more flexible and capable of mediation than his uncle, continued in his efforts to implement the reform, celebrating as many as five synods and issuing numerous decrees; he knew how to surround himself with valuable collaborators – such as Antonio Pagani and the Compagnie di San Girolamo, Fratelli della Santa Croce and delle Dimesse – especially to promote the teaching of catechism and religious instruction to the people.

==== Religiosity and culture ====
Indeed, one of the major problems the bishops had to face was the lack of religious culture. Entrusted to the pastoral care of a poor and ignorant lowly clergy, the population lived a superficial faith, infused with superstition, fed by the outward practices of devotion to patron saints, only occasionally invigorated by some good preacher from outside.

Matteo Priuli, in implementation of the Tridentine decrees, constituted at the cathedral a group of 50 boys from good families and of clear aptitude for the ecclesiastical state who, as soon as they were accepted, were to immediately wear the clerical habit; one half of these were to pay their own maintenance for their studies, the other half were to receive a modest contribution. To this seminarium was assigned the church of St. Francis (old) and the adjoining house (now the Clergy House), in which the two masters of the school, a grammarian and a musician, were to live. To the maintenance of the seminary all religious institutions, including the cathedral chapter and the monasteries, were to contribute part of their income, excluding only those of mendicants: and it was precisely these provisions that aroused further, fierce opposition from the canons and monks.

Matteo's successor, Michele Priuli, among many problems gave priority to the seminary erected by his uncle, trying both to conveniently increase the income of the school and to transform it from open to closed: due to the lack of funding, however, this could only be done for 16 of the seminarian clerics. In order to give them a more qualified education, the bishop called the Somaschi Fathers to Vicenza.

==== Vicenza bishops of the 17th century ====
The two Priuli, reformers of the second half of the 16th century, were succeeded by a series of bishops – almost all belonging to Venetian patrician families and well provided with protection in Rome – much more interested in diplomatic and government careers within the Papal States than in the pastoral care of the diocese entrusted to them. Apart from a few brief periods, they resided very little in Vicenza. The city remained, therefore, firmly in the hands of the local oligarchy whose families shared all civil and religious offices.

==== The new religious orders ====
An important collaboration in the implementation of the reform was given by some religious orders, which were called to Vicenza by the bishops, especially to exercise educational and training functions, both of the people and the clergy.

The entry into the city of the Clerics Regular known as Theatines, an order founded by the Vicenza-born St. Cajetan together with Cardinal Carafa, was prepared by the parish priest of Santo Stefano, Don Girolamo Pisani, who in 1595 ceded the parish to them when they were called to Vicenza by Bishop Michele Priuli. Their settlement became a center of Tridentine religious renewal, and around 1667-1668 they built their own convent. Two years later their founder, St. Cajetan, was canonized, and this attracted considerable donations and contributions from both the municipality and private individuals. When, however, they undertook the complete reconstruction of the parish church of St. Stephen in the last years of the century and yet were denied a change of dedication in favor of their patron saint, they abandoned the parish and in a very short time were able to build themselves the order's new church, with its facade on the main street of the city.

The Somaschi Fathers had already settled in the years 1558-63 at Misericordia in the direction of the orphanage. Twenty years later, despite protests from the cathedral chapter, which saw its right to prebends affected, Bishop Michele Priuli installed them in the parish of Saints Philip and James. Already well known as reform preachers, they were charged with the education of youth and clergy, particularly in the new seminary. During the second half of the seventeenth century, they engaged in the rebuilding of the church and the construction of an imposing convent.

The Jesuits – who already had among their ranks a number of Vicentine aristocrats – came to the city around 1600, drawn by the strong interest of the ruling class in restoring and increasing the public schools, which were badly needed. The Republic of Venice, however, expelled them in 1606 at the time of Pope Paul V's interdict and, unlike other orders, they did not return to the city until 1657.

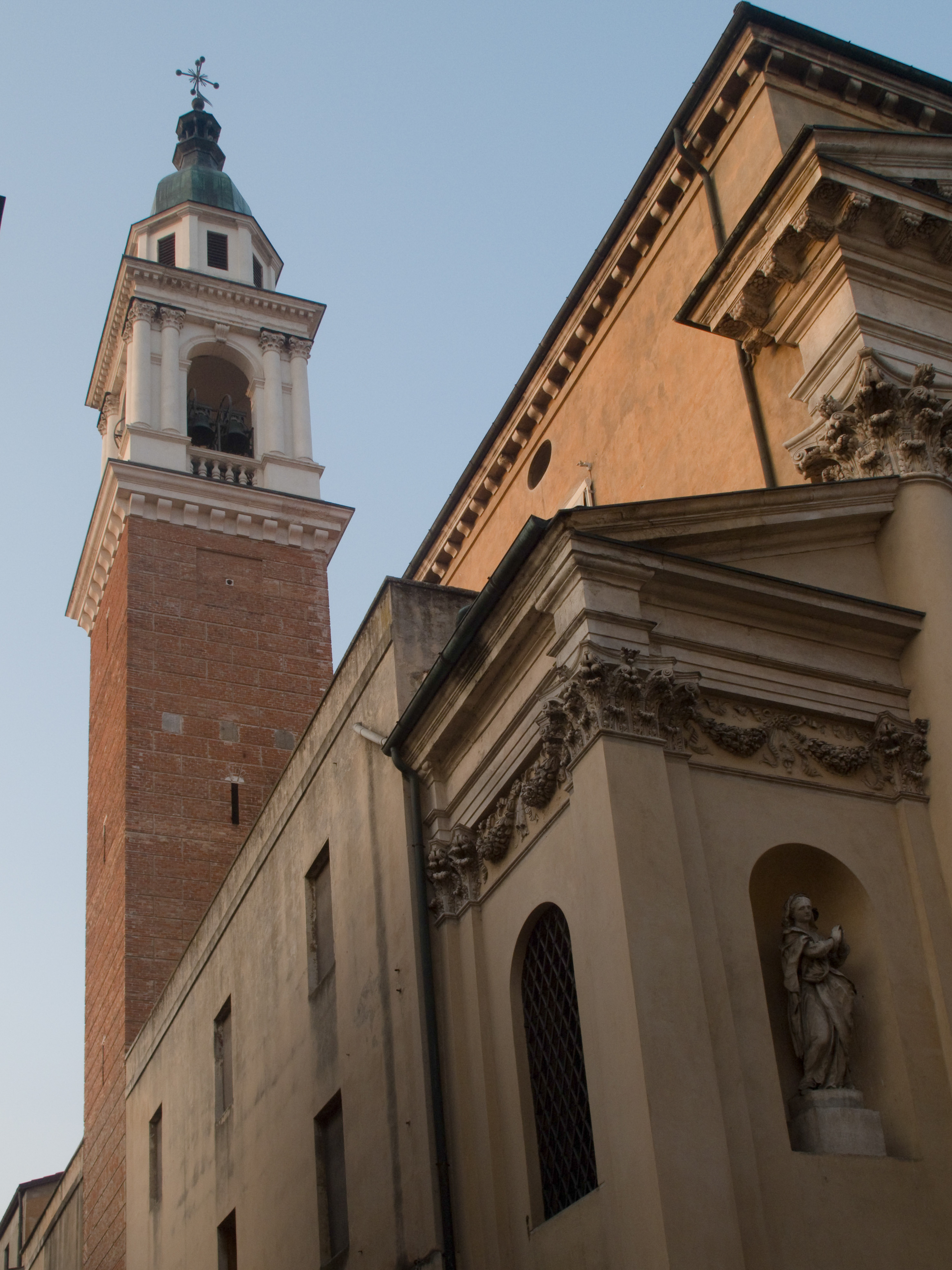
Church of the Filippini – bell tower

The clerics of the congregation of the Oratory of St. Philip Neri – also known as Oratorians – after an initial attempt to settle in Vicenza in 1658 and being commissioned in 1686 to officiate in the church of Saints Faustino and Giovita, settled in the house of the Jesuits in 1719 and the following year obtained as a gift the church and house in Corso Palladio that had belonged to the Jesuits until then.

==== Confraternities and oratories ====
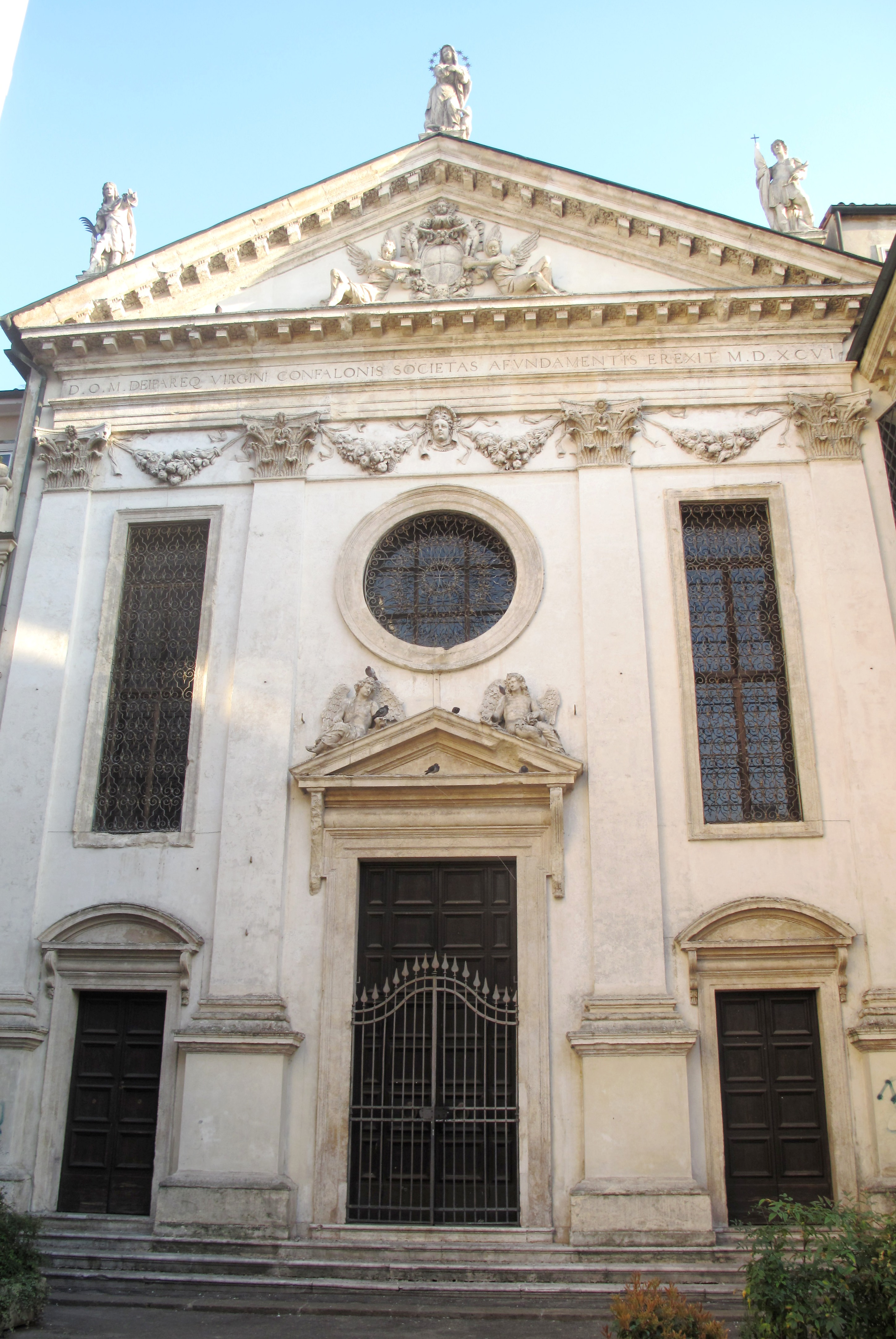
Façade of the Oratory of the Gonfalone in Piazza Duomo

Before the Council of Trent, the ecclesiastical hierarchy seemed to have little interest in lay associationism, which expressed itself through devotional brotherhoods and confraternities, so much so that they were formally established or tacitly recognized without special approval from ecclesiastical authority. The Counter-Reformation, on the other hand, noted their importance, favored them, controlled them and used them as a bulwark against Protestantism. They represented a traditional means of refreshing religious fervor and Christian practice: they solemnly celebrated festivals, venerated Our Lady and the saints, built altars, celebrated processions with pomp and pageantry, engaged in fundraising, and practiced works of charity toward the needy.

Bearers of a religiosity that stemmed from popular faith and, at the same time, from the interests of the city's noble families, they did not easily allow themselves to be subjugated by the bishop's acknowledged jurisdiction. At a time – which lasted until the first half of the 19th century – of crisis in the parish that failed to attract the faithful, the confraternities tried to create religious spaces, in which differences in rites and celebrations certainly did not promote social cohesion – within them they were rigidly divided into nobles, merchants and artisans, according to the mentality of the time – but helped the maturation of a deeper spirituality and more heartfelt devotion. Quickly the city was enriched with oratories, real private churches of the confraternities in which one could receive the sacraments, celebrate Mass, and attend services.

The most important ones in Vicenza were:

- the Confraternity of Our Lady of the Banner. It played an important role in the religious and charitable life of the city, especially for the distribution of graces – that is, subsidies to the needy, which affected all neighborhoods – and for the pious practice of the Forty Hours, in which all the city's parishes participated. The confraternity welcomed among its members the cream of Vicenza's nobility, who made its headquarters, the Oratory of the Gonfalone – built near the Hospital of St. Anthony – one of the richest settings in the city, to the magnificence of which many artists of the seventeenth and eighteenth centuries contributed.
- the Confraternity of the Blessed Sacrament, based in the cathedral
- the Confraternity of the Rosary, which after the Battle of Lepanto had a large chapel and oratory built in the garden of this church
- the Confraternity of the Turchini, whose oratory was also in the garden of the church of Santa Corona
- the Confraternity of the Crucifix, with its oratory behind the church of Santa Maria in Foro, known as the Church of the Servants
- the Confraternity of Saint John the Beheaded, which had its seat in the church of Saints Ambrose and Bellino
- the Confraternity of St. Nicholas of Tolentino, with the oratory of the same name attached to the church of St. Michael.

== Contemporary age ==
Vicenza's complex ecclesiastical system, in its composition of diocese, parishes, monasteries and convents, religious orders and lay confraternities, heritages, privileges and benefices of the clergy, was first modified by the Republic of Venice in the second half of the eighteenth century, then – much more profoundly – in the first decade of the nineteenth century by Napoleonic legislation, which was also preserved under the Habsburg Empire.

=== The suppression of convents and monasteries by the Venetian Republic ===
Some of them – those in which fewer than six religious lived – were suppressed by decree of the Venetian Republic in 1769:

- the most important, run by the Congregation of the Lateran Canons and second in the city in terms of land and property ownership, was the monastery of St. Bartholomew, the structure of which was used to transfer the city hospitals to it
- the convent of the Friars Minor at the church of San Giuliano
- the convent and college of St. James, run by the Somaschi Fathers. While the convent was transferred to the municipality, the church returned to function with a secular parish priest until 1810, after which the parish seat was transferred by decree to the church of Santo Stefano
- Santa Lucia monastery, run by the Camaldolese. The church remained the parish seat, open for worship, and the monks – who had been transferred to Murano – continued to appoint its parish priest for the cure of souls.
- the convent of the Eremitani of San Michele in Borgo Berga; it too still remained a parish seat.

=== Napoleonic reform ===
After the third occupation of the city by French troops, under the Napoleonic Kingdom of Italy, all remaining convents, monasteries and religious institutes were suppressed between 1806 and 1810.

==== The suppression of the male orders ====
Of the thirteen male orders, by the viceregal decree of July 28, 1806, the following were removed from their seats:

- the Benedictines, the monastery and the Basilica of Saints Felix and Fortunatus. The complex of buildings passed to the city state property – but in the meantime the dispersal and alienation of property had begun, including a part of the buildings
- the Capuchins, from the monastery of San Pietro in Vivarolo, moreover, which had already been destroyed by a violent fire on the night of November 3, 1805, as French troops were entering Vicenza; it ended up being demolished in 1817 and its materials were used for the construction of the Major Cemetery
- the Carmelites, from the monastery attached to the church of Santa Croce in San Giacomo Maggiore known as dei Carmini
- the Franciscans, from the convent of San Lorenzo. Church and convent were looted and used first as a military hospital, then for the quartering of troops
- the Minims, from the convent of San Biagio nuovo
- the Theatines, from the church of San Gaetano, which was in danger of being demolished, but through the interest of Bishop Pietro Marco Zaguri and the municipality itself was saved and reopened for worship as a branch of the nearby church of Santo Stefano

The following were able to remain, at least partially, in their convent or institute:

- the Capuchins, who for a few years had replaced the Minims in the convent and church of St. Julian's
- the Discalced Carmelites, in the church of San Girolamo (now San Marco)
- the Dominicans, in the convent attached to the church of Santa Corona
- the Oratorians, in the church of San Filippo Neri
- the Reformed, who ran the oratory of St. Joseph
- the Somaschi Fathers, who served in various educational and welfare facilities in the city, such as the Misericordia orphanage, St. Valentine's Hospital and the bishop's seminary
- the Servants of Mary, at the shrine of Our Lady of Monte Berico.

All of these were also later suppressed by the Napoleonic decree of Compiègne of April 25, 1810, which ordered the dissolution of religious orders and confraternities.

==== The suppression of women's orders ====
Of the fourteen women's convents or monasteries that existed in the city, some were suppressed with the implementation of the 1806 decree, expelling:

- the Augustinian nuns, from the convent of St. Thomas, in Borgo Berga. The buildings were used for military purposes. The parish functions, entrusted at first to the church of San Silvestro, in 1810 shifted to that of Santa Caterina.
- the Benedictines from the monastery of St. Catherine, who along with others were concentrated in the Corpus Christi convent
- the Augustinian nuns, from the convent of Santa Maria Nova
- the Benedictines, from the church and monastery of San Silvestro. The church, which still retained parish functions, where a priest was maintained with the monastery's income, remained open until 1810, when the cure of souls was transferred to St. Catherine's.
- the "calced" Carmelites (or Teresians), moved from the monastery of St. Roch to the convent of St. Dominic
- the Dominican nuns, moved from the convent of St. Dominic to the monastery of St. Roch and replaced by the Teresians

Instead, the following monasteries were left standing:

- St. Peter's Benedictines. Also belonging to the monastery was the Church of St. Andrew, which had previously been the parish seat and was torn down and reduced to a dwelling house during this period
- of the Canonesses of Saint Augustine of the monastery in Contrà Corpus Domini
- of the Capuchin nuns, in Contrà San Domenico
- of the Poor Clares of the monastery of Santa Chiara
- of the Poor Clares of Santa Maria in Araceli
- of the Poor Clares of St. Francis Nuovo in Borgo Pusterla
- of the Convertite di Santa Maria Maddalena, in Contrà della Misericordia near Ponte Novo
- of the Dimesse di Santa Croce

All these monasteries and convents were later suppressed by the decree of 1810. The buildings – apart from a few churches that continued to be places of worship, sometimes parish seats – became the property of the municipal state property and reduced to barracks or warehouses.

==== City parishes ====
By Napoleonic decree Dec. 18, 1807, ordering ecclesiastical reorganization, the parish network in the city of Vicenza was completely downsized, with the aim of eliminating superfluous centers of worship. The number of parishes was reduced by one-third; the following were suppressed:

- of Santi Faustino e Giovita; partly incorporated into the parish of Santo Stefano and partly into that of Servi. The church was deconsecrated and almost completely stripped of all the works of art it possessed; the altars were moved to other locations. Passed to the municipal property, the building was used as a warehouse
- of St. Eleuterio (later St. Barbara), incorporated first into the parish of the Servants and then, after an appeal by the parishioners of St. Stephen, into the latter
- of Saints Philip and James (or St. James Minor), whose seat was transferred to the church of Santo Stefano
- St. Paul's, which was transferred, along with St. Michael's, to the church of the Servants.

Only the three parishes remained in the historic center – strictly speaking:

- of the Cathedral of Santa Maria Annunciata
- of Santo Stefano
- of San Marcello, later transported from the church of the same name to the nearby Oratory of San Filippo Neri

Other parishes in the city were established in churches that had belonged to monasteries or convents suppressed during this period:

- of Santa Maria in Foro at the Church of the Servants, which replaced the former parish of San Michele, whose church was later demolished in 1812
- of Santa Caterina, a parish in Borgo Berga
- of Santa Maria in Araceli, parish of Borgo Santa Lucia
- of San Pietro, parish of Borgo San Pietro
- of Santi Felice e Fortunato, parish of Borgo San Felice
- of Santa Croce in San Giacomo, parish of Borgo Porta Nova
- of San Marco in San Girolamo. Here the parish seat of Borgo Pusterla was moved, first located in the old town chapel, which was immediately demolished.

The parish priests became officials of the state, as well as of the church, responsible for their faithful from the civil point of view as well: they were entrusted with the task of keeping the registry office, issuing certificates of illness or poverty, and keeping the lists of conscripts for military conscription. The economic administration of the parish was also changed: the assets were divided between the beneficium, which served the maintenance of the parish priest (who was assigned a congrua, in case the beneficium was not sufficient) and the quarta fabricae, that is, the patrimony that served the maintenance of the parish buildings, the management of the latter was entrusted to the fabbricieri, a committee of laymen appointed by the state.

Many clergymen – deprived of their sources of income because Napoleonic legislation had forfeited to the state property the legacies of worship, i.e., bequests for the celebration of religious services – also went to swell the ranks of the parish clergy: at that time the city had an average of one priest for every 150 inhabitants.

==== The Confraternities ====
In 1806 Eugène de Beauharnais issued an edict for the forfeiture of the assets not only of the abbeys and commendas, but also of the confraternities, which were then dissolved. Their assets, and so those of the Gonfalone, were forfeited into the assets of the newly established Congregation of Charity.

Almost all the confraternities in Vicenza with their oratories or chapels were suppressed. As had happened with many churches and convents, after the suppression most of the oratories were closed, stripped of all works and demolished. Bishop Marco Zaguri of Vicenza managed to avoid the suppression of only the Confraternity of the Blessed Sacrament, into which many confreres of the Gonfalone converged, so they could continue to keep the oratory open and officiate there the Forty Hours.

==== The effects of the Napoleonic ecclesiastical reform ====
The Napoleonic reform accomplished, by means of external impositions and in a very short time, a part of what had not been implemented within the Church even by the hierarchy, as, for example, the two bishops Priuli had tried in vain to do in the second half of the sixteenth century.

With the decrees the Church lost an enormous amount of real estate (at the end of the eighteenth century it accounted for about a third of the city area) of benefices and annuities. The close relationship with the aristocracy, which throughout the modern age had enriched the Church with bequests, construction of buildings, chapels, furnishings and works of art, even of great value, also ceased. Instead, the relationship between Church functions and attention to the humbler and poorer population improved.

Parish life also benefited, as reflected in the report of Bishop Giuseppe Maria Peruzzi during his episcopate between 1818 and 1825. The churches were well maintained, the clergy disciplined, catechetical instruction widespread in every parish; the assessment of the life of faith was different: both conscience and religious practice had cooled, and moral customs also left something to be desired.

=== The Vicenza church under the Lombard-Venetian Kingdom ===
==== Pro-Habsburg bishop Giuseppe Maria Peruzzi ====
After a long period of vacant episcopal see (1810-1818), the new bishop Giuseppe Maria Peruzzi, formerly bishop of Caorle and then of Chioggia, arrived in Vicenza on January 1, 1819. Two years earlier he had been appointed directly by the Emperor of Austria as bishop of Vicenza, a designation that had not, however, been validated by Pope Pius VII, who only with the indult of November 13, 1817, granted Francis I the power to appoint bishops from the Veneto.

Peruzzi was openly pro-Habsburg: even in 1797, after the Treaty of Campo Formio, he had openly sided with the Austrians, who intended to bring about the revival of holy morality and the free exercise of the Catholic religion. As soon as he arrived in Vicenza, he immediately prepared the diocesan pastoral visitation – of which he wrote a thorough report in which, however, he expressed a positive assessment of the Napoleonic reform.

==== Giovanni Giuseppe Cappellari, towards Italianism ====
On January 5, 1832, just over a year after Peruzzi's death, the emperor appointed the elderly rector of the University of Padua Giovanni Giuseppe Cappellari as bishop of Vicenza, an appointment confirmed six months later by Pope Gregory XVI, his relative. With him began one of the most important episcopates of the contemporary age, which stimulated the rebirth of the Vicenza Church.

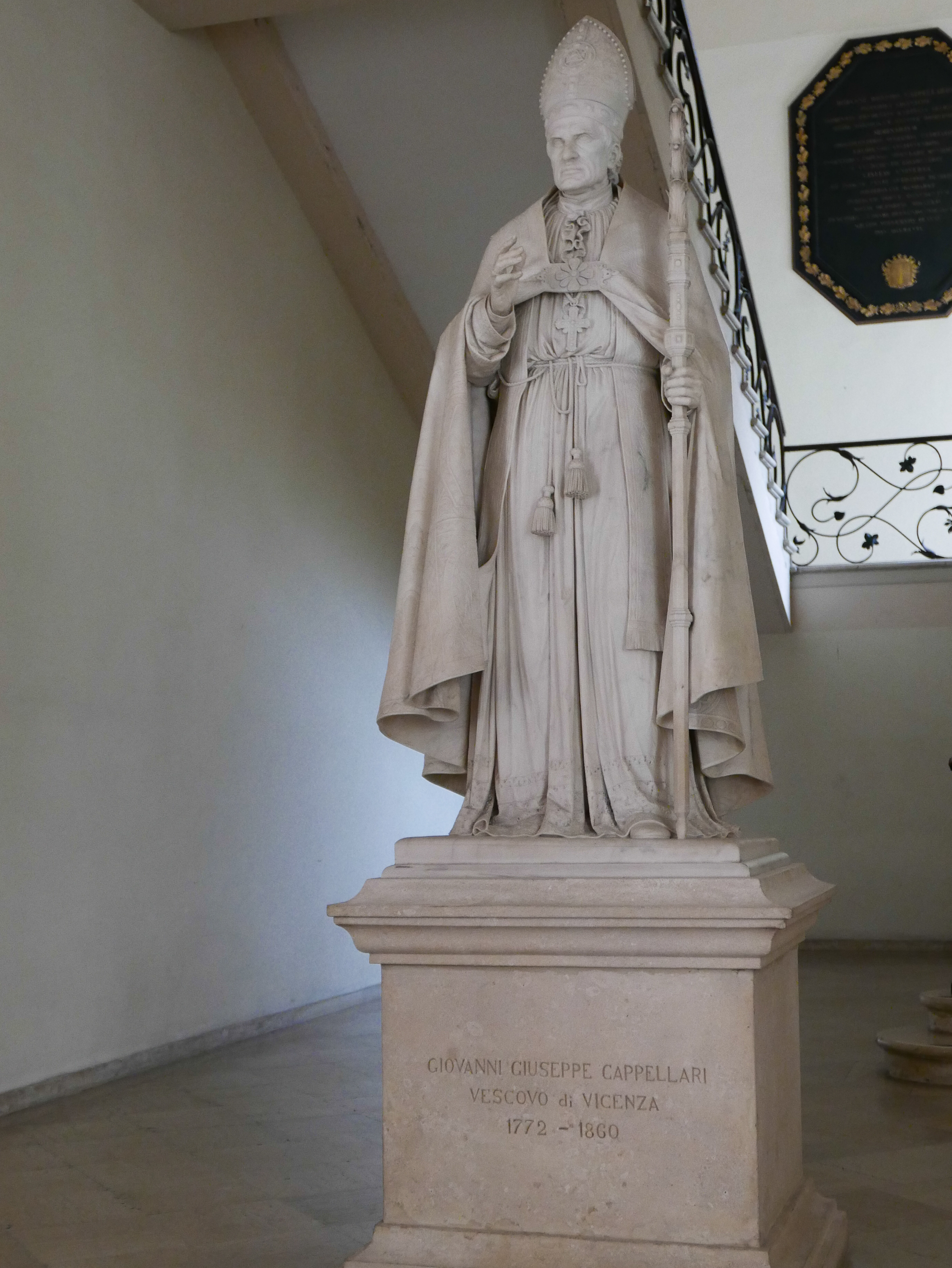
Statue of Bishop Cappellari in the Major Seminary of Vicenza

Endowed with considerable humanistic and theological culture, he was open to the principles that were emerging in the contemporary age and to Rosminian spirituality, which had also spread in Vicenza especially among seminary teachers such as Giacomo Zanella and Giuseppe Fogazzaro, priests whom he protected during the Risorgimento uprisings of 1848.

Strongly convinced of the importance of culturally and spiritually forming the diocesan clergy, he reformed their course of studies and had the imposing Major Seminary built just outside Porta Santa Lucia.

Through his pastoral action he promoted diocesan institutions and initiatives that transcended the narrow parish sphere. He favored the slow return to the city of a number of religious orders and congregations after they had been dissolved due to Napoleonic decrees; he approved the establishment of the Institute of the Sisters Teachers of St. Dorothy, Daughters of the Sacred Hearts created by Giovanni Antonio Farina in 1836, the Women's College of English Ladies and the Congregation of Exercises to the People; he supported the Sons of Charity established in 1836 by Don Luigi Fabris for the education of poor and abandoned youth, and in the same year promoted the first Society of St. Vincent de Paul in Vicenza.

As for the political aspect, while sympathizing with liberal ideas and favoring the unification of Italy and showing aversion to the interference of the Habsburg authorities, he always maintained a great balance, even to protect the population. During the Insurrection of 1848 he gave support, including through pastoral letters, to the city's provisional government but then, after the defeat, interceded with the Austrians for a pacification.

In 1854 he succeeded in inaugurating the new seminary, which he tenaciously wanted. His resignation, repeatedly requested because of increasingly poor health. was always refused by the pope; he died on February 7, 1860, deeply mourned by the whole city.

==== Giovanni Antonio Farina, the transition between the Habsburg Empire and the Kingdom of Italy ====
In June 1860 Bishop Giovanni Antonio Farina of Treviso was transferred to the diocese of Vicenza, which he joined in December. This assignment was given to him at a politically difficult time; in the ten years since the insurrectional uprisings of 1848, strong tensions had arisen in the city between pro-Austrian conservative Catholics and those who manifested liberal ideas favorable to the forthcoming Kingdom of Italy.

On the same day of his entrance into the diocese, the new bishop wrote his first pastoral letter to the clergy and people of Vicenza, in which he called for unity of spirit and sentiment with the Pope, a letter that was interpreted politically as loyalty to the Emperor of Austria (to whom Antonio Farina was actually bound by gratitude for his appointment) and he was accused of being "Austrianist." According to Franzina, the new bishop created a climate of austerity and obscurantism toward clergy and laity, many of whom – found guilty at times of immorality, at times of pro-Italian, liberal or Unitarian sympathies – were removed from their posts, such as seminary rector Antonio Graziani; indeed, Farina regularly solicited the intervention of Austrian police authorities to make this repression more effective.

In 1863 he convened the diocesan synod – which had not been constituted for more than 170 years – and the following year he began the pastoral visitation throughout the diocese; in 1866 the visitation was interrupted by political events, including the annexation of Veneto to Italy, which gave rise to demonstrations of hostility against the bishop.

During the decade of his Vicenza episcopate, Farina carried out pastoral activity oriented toward the cultural and spiritual formation of the clergy and the faithful, catechetical teaching of children, and the reform of studies and discipline in the seminary. He established confraternities for the relief of the poor, elderly priests and for preaching to the people.

He participated in the sessions of the First Vatican Council until June 14, 1870, then having to abandon it for health reasons; for this absence he was strongly attacked by the Vicenza liberal press. After a first serious illness in 1886, his physique gradually weakened, so much so that the end of 1887 the Holy See granted him a coadjutor in the person of Antonio Maria De Pol, who would succeed him in the episcopal chair, and he died in March 1888.

== See also ==
- History of religious architecture in Vicenza
- Bartholomew of Breganze
- Giovanni de Surdis Cacciafronte

== Bibliography ==
- AA.VV. (1989). Ven. Antonio Pagani O. F. M: riformatore – fondatore – maestro di spirito in Vita Minorum, 2 [Ven. Anthony Pagani O. F. M: reformer – founder – master of spirit in Vita Minorum, 2] (in Italian). Montegrotto Terme.
- Azzara, Claudio (2002). L'Italia dei barbari [Italy of the barbarians] (in Italian). Bologna: Il Mulino. ISBN 88-15-08812-1.
- Azzara, Claudio; Rapetti, Anna Maria (2009). La Chiesa nel Medioevo [The Church in the Middle Ages] (in Italian). Bologna: Il Mulino. ISBN 978-88-15-13271-0.
- Barbieri, Franco; Cevese, Renato (2004). Vicenza, ritratto di una città [Vicenza, portrait of a city] (in Italian). Vicenza: Angelo Colla editore. ISBN 88-900990-7-0.
- Cracco, Giorgio (2009). Tra Venezia e Terraferma [Between Venice and the Mainland] (in Italian). Roma: Viella editore. ISBN 978-88-8334-396-4.
- Cracco Ruggini, Lelia (1988). Storia totale di una piccola città: Vicenza romana, in Storia di Vicenza, Vol. I [Complete history of a small city: Roman Vicenza, in History of Vicenza, Vol. I.] (in Italian). Vicenza: Neri Pozza editore.
- Dato, Pino; Rebesani, Fulvio (2005). Onisto, un vescovo pastore nella Sagrestia d'Italia [Onisto, a pastor bishop in the Sacristy of Italy] (in Italian). Vicenza: I Girasoli Dedalus.
- Del Col, Andrea (2006). L'Inquisizione in Italia dal XII al XXI secolo [The Inquisition in Italy from the 12th to the 21st century] (in Italian). Milano: Mondadori editore. ISBN 978-88-04-53433-4.
- Franzina, Emilio (1980). Vicenza, Storia di una città [Vicenza, History of a city] (in Italian). Vicenza: Neri Pozza editore.
- Zanolo, Alba Lazzaretto (1991). La parrocchia nella Chiesa e nella società vicentina dall'età napoleonica ai nostri giorni, in Storia di Vicenza, IV/1, L'Età contemporanea [The Parish in the Church and Society of Vicenza from the Napoleonic Age to the Present Day, in History of Vicenza, IV/1, The Contemporary Age] (in Italian). Vicenza: Neri Pozza editore.
- Mantese, Giovanni (1952). Memorie storiche della Chiesa vicentina, I, Dalle origini al Mille [Historical Memoirs of the Church of Vicenza, I, From the origins to the year 1000] (in Italian). Vicenza: Accademia Olimpica.
- Mantese, Giovanni (1954). Memorie storiche della Chiesa vicentina, II, Dal Mille al Milletrecento [Historical Memoirs of the Church of Vicenza, II, From the year 1000 to the year 1300.] (in Italian). Vicenza: Accademia Olimpica.
- Mantese, Giovanni (1958). Memorie storiche della Chiesa vicentina, III/1, Il Trecento [Historical Memoirs of the Church of Vicenza, III/1, The Fourteenth Century] (in Italian). Vicenza: Accademia Olimpica.
- Mantese, Giovanni (1964). Memorie storiche della Chiesa vicentina, III/2, Dal 1404 al 1563 [Historical Memoirs of the Church of Vicenza, III/2, From 1404 to 1563] (in Italian). Vicenza: Accademia Olimpica.
- Mantese, Giovanni (1974). Memorie storiche della Chiesa vicentina, IV, Dal 1563 al 1700 [Historical Memoirs of the Church of Vicenza, IV/1, From 1563 to 1700] (in Italian). Vicenza: Accademia Olimpica.
- Mantese, Giovanni (1982). Memorie storiche della Chiesa vicentina, V, Dal 1700 al 1866 [Historical Memoirs of the Church of Vicenza, V/1, From 1700 to 1866] (in Italian). Vicenza: Accademia Olimpica.
- Mantese, Giovanni (1988). Organizzazione ecclesiastica e strutture religiose: dall'età tardo-romana al secolo XIX, in Storia di Vicenza, III, L'Età della Repubblica Veneta [Church organization and religious structures: from the late Roman age to the 19th century, in History of Vicenza, III, The Age of the Venetian Republic] (in Italian). Vicenza: Neri Pozza editore.
- Mantese, Giovanni (1972). Giuseppe Maria Peruzzi vescovo di Vicenza (1818-1830), in Una visita pastorale di Giuseppe Maria Peruzzi nella diocesi di Vicenza (1819-1825) [Giuseppe Maria Peruzzi bishop of Vicenza (1818-1830), in A pastoral visit of Giuseppe Maria Peruzzi in the diocese of Vicenza (1819-1825)] (in Italian). Roma.
- Pacini, Gian Piero (1994). Laici, Chiesa locale, Città. Dalla Fraglia di Santa Maria alla Confraternita del Gonfalone a Vicenza (Sec. XV – XVII) [Laity, Local Church, City. From the Brotherhood of Saint Mary to the Confraternity of the Banner in Vicenza (15th – 17th centuries).] (in Italian). Vicenza: Ed. Egida.
- Previtali, Attilio (1991). Vicenza paleocristiana: cenni storici [Early Christian Vicenza: historical background] (in Italian). Vicenza.
- Previtali, Attilio (1994). La Chiesa vicentina delle origini [The early church in Vicenza] (in Italian). Padova: Gregoriana.
- Previtali, Attilio (2001). Le chiese del primo millennio nella diocesi di Vicenza [The churches of the first millennium in the diocese of Vicenza] (in Italian). Vicenza.
- Previtali, Attilio (2003). Oratori Vicentini [Vicentine Oratories] (in Italian). Vicenza: Palladio Editore.
- Previtali, Attilio (2005). Cimeli paleocristiani e altomedievali nel Museo Diocesano di Vicenza [Early Christian and early medieval relics in the Diocesan Museum of Vicenza] (in Italian). Vicenza.
- Reato, Ermenegildo (1991). La liquidazione dell'asse ecclesiastico a Vicenza (1866-1968), in Storia di Vicenza, IV/1, L'Età contemporanea [The liquidation of the ecclesiastical axis in Vicenza (1866-1968), in History of Vicenza, IV/1, The Contemporary Age] (in Italian). Vicenza: Neri Pozza editore.
- Reato, Ermenegildo (1991). I cattolici vicentini dall'opposizione al governo (1866-67), in Storia di Vicenza, IV/1, L'Età contemporanea [Vicenza Catholics from opposition to government (1866-67), in History of Vicenza, IV/1, The Contemporary Age] (in Italian). Vicenza: Neri Pozza editore.
- Reato, Ermenegildo (1991). Pensiero e azione sociale dei cattolici vicentini e veneti dalla Rerum Novarum al fascismo (1891-1922) [Thought and social action of Catholics from Vicenza and Veneto from Rerum Novarum to Fascism (1891-1922)] (in Italian). Vicenza: Edizioni Nuovo Progetto – Tip. ISG.
- Scremin, Mauro (1988). Per una storia della pietà popolare tra osservanza e trasgressione, in Storia di Vicenza, III, L'Età della Repubblica Veneta [For a History of Popular Piety between Observance and Transgression, in History of Vicenza, III, The Age of the Venetian Republic.] (in Italian). Vicenza: Neri Pozza editore.
- Stella, Aldo (1988). Le minoranze religiose, in Storia di Vicenza, III, L'Età della Repubblica Veneta [Religious minorities, in History of Vicenza, III, The Age of the Venetian Republic.] (in Italian). Vicenza: Neri Pozza editore.
- Settia, Aldo (1988). Vicenza di fronte ai Longobardi e ai Franchi, in Storia di Vicenza, II, L'Età Medievale [Vicenza Facing the Lombards and the Franks, in History of Vicenza, II, The Medieval Age.] (in Italian). Vicenza: Neri Pozza editore.
- Zironda, Renato (1988). Aspetti del clero secolare e regolare della Chiesa vicentina. Dal 1404 al 1563, in Storia di Vicenza, III, L'Età della Repubblica Veneta [Aspects of the Secular and Regular Clergy of the Church of Vicenza. From 1404 to 1563, in History of Vicenza, III, The Age of the Venetian Republic.] (in Italian). Vicenza: Neri Pozza editore.
- Sottani, Natalino (2014). Cento chiese, una città [One hundred churches, one city] (in Italian). Vicenza: Edizioni Rezzara.
