= Priuli =

Venetian patrician family

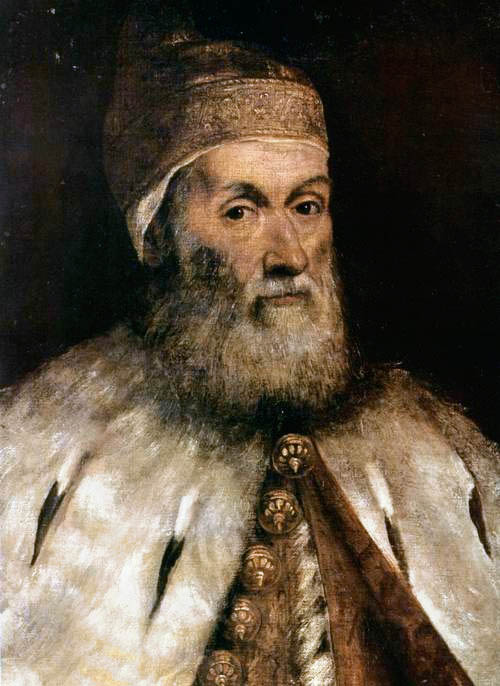
Portrait of Girolamo Priuli (detail), by Tintoretto (Detroit Institute of Arts)

The House of Priuli was a prominent aristocratic family in the Republic of Venice; they entered the Venetian nobility early in the 14th century. Their members include:

- Andriana Priuli - wife of Francesco Cornaro, Doge of Venice (1625–1629)
- Antonio Priuli (1548–1623), 94th Doge of Venice (1618–1623)
- Antonio Priuli (fl. 1669), Venetian official
- Antonio Priuli (fl. 1670), provveditore generale of Dalmatia
- Antonio Maria Priuli, bishop of Venice 1738-1767; bishop of Padova
- Bianca Priuli - mother of Bertuccio Valiero, Doge of Venice (1656–1658)
- Giovanni Priuli (1575–1626), Venetian composer and organist
- Girolamo Priuli (1476–1547) aristocrat and diarist
- Girolamo Priuli (1486–1567) 83rd Doge of Venice, starting in 1559
- Girolamo Priuli (fl. 1616–1630), genealogist
- Hieronimo Priuli, Podesta e capitanio di Rovigo, Provveditor General di Polesina, 17th century
- Lorenzo Priuli (1489–1559) 82nd Doge of Venice, starting in 1556
- Lorenzo Priuli (cardinal) (1537-1600), Patriarch of Venice 1591-1600
- Ludovico Priuli assistant to Cardinal Reginald Pole (1500–1558)
- Matteo Priuli (bishop), Bishop of Novigrad (1561–1565), and Bishop of Vicenza (1565–1579)
- Matteo Priuli (cardinal)
- Michele Priuli (died 1603), bishop of Vicenza
- Michele Priuli, son of Francesco, Venetian Senator and Procurator (1627)
- Marieta Morosina Priuli (fl. 1665) Italian composer
- Nicolo' Priuli - (1792- prior to 1855) statesman and patron
- Pietro Priuli, bishop of Bergamo, cardinal

== Sources ==
- Thomas Okey (1907). The old Venetian palaces and old Venetian folk. J.M. Dent. pp. 203-.
