= Matteo Priuli =

Matteo Priuli may refer to:

- Matteo Priuli (bishop), 16th century Italian Roman Catholic bishop
- Matteo Priuli (cardinal) (1577–1624), Italian Roman Catholic cardinal
