= Giacomo Contarini =

Giacomo Contarini may refer to:

- Jacopo Contarini (1193–1280), doge of Venice
- Giacomo Contarini (1456–1498)
- Giacomo Contarini (1536–1595), collector of mathematical instruments
