= Girolamo Priuli =

Girolamo Priuli may refer to:

- Girolamo Priuli (1486–1567), Doge of Venice
- Girolamo Priuli (1476–1547), Venetian diarist
- Girolamo Priuli (17th century), Venetian genealogist
