= Giacomo Contarini (1456–1498) =

Giacomo Contarini (1456–1498) was a Venetian patrician and diplomat.

Contarini was born in Venice in 1456. He was a scion of the Contarini and Gritti families, the son of Ambrogio di Nicolò Contarini and Andriana di Andrea Gritti. He studied philosophy and law. Girolamo Priuli praises him as a "most learned man". Marco Barbaro calls him a "writer", but none of his writings are known.

Contarini was elected ambassador to Spain on 24 February 1496. On 8 June, he received a formal commission that included extending the republic's congratulations to King Manuel I of Portugal on his marriage to Isabella of Aragon. He arrived in Spain on 31 October. According to Marino Sanuto the Younger, King Ferdinand and Queen Isabella met him a Torres Vedras, knighted him and presented him with a black and white "civet" (zibeta or gazela). This embassy is also recorded by Damião de Góis. Contarini's main goal was to prevent Spain from reaching a peace agreement with France in the First Italian War. In this he was unsuccessful. Having fallen ill, he was authorized to leave Spain on 11 October 1497. In November, Spain and France reached an agreement dividing Italy between themselves.

Contarini returned to Venice on 9 June 1498 and died there a few months later, after making his report to the Venetian Senate. He was buried in Santo Stefano. His will, dated 1 June 1496, left everything to his brothers and sisters.

== Bibliography ==
- Beverley, Tessa (1999). Venetian Ambassadors, 1454–94: An Italian Elite (PDF) (PhD dissertation). University of Warwick.
- Garrisson, Janine (1995). A History of Sixteenth Century France, 1483–1598: Renaissance, Reformation and Rebellion. Macmillan.
- Halikowski Smith, Stefan (2017). "Gasparo Contarini's Relazione of November 1525 to the Venetian Senate on the Divergent Dynamics of the Spanish and Portuguese World Empires". Mediterranean Historical Review. 32 (2): 189–235. doi:10.1080/09518967.2017.1396764.
- Povolo, Claudio (1983). "Contarini, Giacomo". Dizionario Biografico degli Italiani (in Italian). Vol. 28: Conforto–Cordero. Rome: Institute of the Italian Encyclopaedia. ISBN 978-88-12-00032-6.
