= Giovanni Delfino (camerlengo) =

17th-century Catholic bishop

His Eminence Giovanni Delfino
- Cardinal-Priest of San Carlo ai Catinari
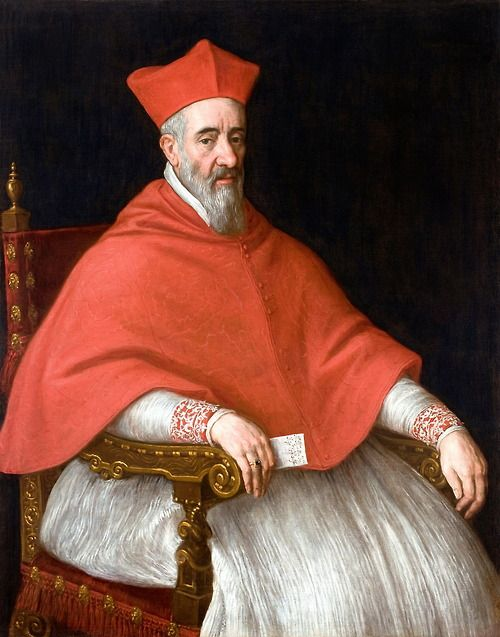
- Portrait by Leandro Bassano
- Church: Catholic Church

Orders
- Consecration: 27 Dec 1603 by Alfonso Visconti

Personal details
- Born: 15 December 1545 Venice, Italy
- Died: 25 November 1622 (age 76) Venice, Italy
- Coat of arms

Cardinal Giovanni Dolfin, often Italianized as Delfin or Delfino (15 December 1545 - 25 November 1622), was an Italian politician and cardinal. He was one of several cardinals from his family by this name. He is the uncle of Cardinal Giovanni Delfino (iuniore).

== Biography ==
Dolfin was born and grew up in Venice, Italy. Having obtained the degree of Doctor in utroque jure at the University of Padua, Giovanni Delfino seemed to want to embrace the ecclesiastical state, but was instead initiated into a political and diplomatic career; after having exercised some minor offices in Venice, in 1577 he was appointed podestà and captain of Belluno.

Between 1582 and 1595, he was sent as ambassador of the Republic of Venice to Poland, Spain, Germany and France. When he returned eight years later, he was appointed ambassador to the Holy See, a post he held from 1595 to 1598. On 23 June 1598, Delfino was elected Procurator of San Marco. On 18 April 1599, he officially represented Venice at the wedding of Philip III of Spain and Margaret of Austria; and in 1600 at those of Henry IV of France and Marie de' Medici.

Returning to his homeland, he also occupied the post of one of the Riformatori dello studio di Padova.

In 1603, the Bishop of Vicenza was vacant, due to the death of the incumbent, Michele Priuli. Pope Clement VIII decided to assign the diocese to Delfin, to whom he was bound by ties of sympathy and mutual respect, despite the fact that Delfin was not a priest and Venetian law did not allow ecclesiastical offices to be held by persons who had resided at the court of Rome. On 27 December 1603, he was consecrated bishop by Cardinal Alfonso Visconti, Bishop of Spoleto, with Tommaso Contarini, Archbishop of Candia, and Leonardo Mocenigo, Bishop of Ceneda, serving as co-consecrators.

Delfino resigned from the diocese of Vicenza, after he became a cardinal, in favor of his brother Dionisio Delfini. The exchange was approved by Pope Paul V on 19 June 1606.

== Cardinalate ==
Bishop Giovanni Delfino was named a cardinal-priest by Pope Clement VIII on 9 June 1604. He was assigned the titular church of San Matteo in Merulana on 24 November 1604, which he exchanged for San Marco on 1 June 1605. He opted for the titular church of San Gerolamo degli Illirici on 23 June 1621, and then for San Carlo ai Catinari on 28 August 1622.

He served a term as Chamberlain (Camerlengo) of the College of Cardinals from 7 January 1619 to 13 January 1620.

He died in Venice on 25 November 1622, at the age of 77.

== Episcopal succession ==
While bishop and cardinal, he was the principal consecrator of:

- Aloisio Grimani, Archbishop of Candia (1605);
- Cornelio Sozomeno, Bishop of Pula (1605);
- Denis Delfino, Bishop of Vicenza (1606);
- Octavius Saraceni, Bishop of Sovana (1606);
- Giovanni Emo, Bishop of Bergamo (1611);
- Pietro Emo, Titular Bishop of Larissa in Syria and Coadjutor Bishop of Crema (1612);
- Bartolomeo Cartolario, Bishop of Chioggia (1613);
- Andreas Corbelli, Bishop of Canea (1613);
- Gian Alberto Garzoni, Bishop of Canea (1614);
- Vitalis de L'Estang, Titular Bishop of Ephesus and Coadjutor Bishop of Carcassonne (1615);
- Pietro Paolo Miloto, Bishop of Chioggia (1615); and
- Matteo Sanudo, Titular Bishop of Ioppe and Coadjutor Bishop of Concordia (1615).

== See also ==
- Bust of Cardinal Giovanni Dolfin

== Sources ==
- Gauchat, Patritius (Patrice) (1935). Hierarchia catholica (in Latin). Vol. IV (1592-1667). Münster: Libraria Regensbergiana.
- Riccardi, Tommaso (1786). Storia Dei Vescovi Vicentini (in Italian). Vicenza: Vendramini Mosca.

Catholic Church titles
| Preceded by Michele Priuli | Bishop of Vicenza; 1603–1606 | Succeeded by Denis Delfino |
| Preceded by Giovanni Evangelista Pallotta | Cardinal-Priest of San Matteo in Merulana; 1604–1605 | Succeeded by Roberto Francesco Romolo Bellarmino |
| Preceded by Agostino Valier | Cardinal-Priest of San Marco; 1605–1621 | Succeeded by Matteo Priuli (cardinal) |
| Preceded by Matteo Priuli (cardinal) | Cardinal-Priest of San Girolamo dei Croati; 1621–1622 | Succeeded by Péter Pázmány |
| Preceded by Luigi Capponi | Cardinal-Priest of San Carlo ai Catinari; 1622 | Succeeded by |
