= Denis Delfino =

1xth-century Catholic bishop

Most Reverend Denis Delfino
- Bishop of Vicenza
- Church: Catholic Church
- In office: 1606–1626
- Predecessor: Giovanni Delfino (seniore)
- Successor: Federico Baldissera Bartolomeo Cornaro

Orders
- Consecration: 2 Jul 1606 by Giovanni Delfino

Personal details
- Died: 1626

Denis Delfino (died 1626) was a Roman Catholic prelate who served as Bishop of Vicenza (1606–1626).

== Biography ==
On 19 Jun 1606, Denis Delfino was appointed during the papacy of Pope Paul V as Bishop of Vicenza. On 2 Jul 1606, he was consecrated bishop by Giovanni Delfino, Cardinal-Priest of San Marco, with Fabio Biondi, Titular Patriarch of Jerusalem, and Metello Bichi, Bishop Emeritus of Sovana, serving as co-consecrators. He served as Bishop of Vicenza until his death in 1626.

== External links and additional sources ==
- Cheney, David M. "Diocese of Vicenza". Catholic-Hierarchy.org. (for Chronology of Bishops) ^{[self-published]}
- Chow, Gabriel. "Diocese of Vicenza". GCatholic.org. (for Chronology of Bishops) ^{[self-published]}

Catholic Church titles
Preceded by Giovanni Delfino (seniore)	Bishop of Vicenza; 1606–1626	Succeeded by Federico Baldissera Bartolomeo Cornaro
