= Bartholomew of Breganze =

Bartholomew of Breganze (c. 1200 – 1 July 1271) was an Italian Dominican friar and bishop.

== Life ==
Bartholomew of Breganze was born in the city of Vicenza to the noble family of Da Breganze (from Breganze). He studied at Padua, receiving there the habit of the recently founded Dominican Order from the hands of Saint Dominic himself, at about twenty years old. Following his ordination as a priest, he quickly came to serve in various positions of leadership in the new order. According to Friar Leander, author of his earliest biography, he was made Master of the Sacred Palace in 1235, during the pontificate of Pope Gregory IX—but there is no mention of this event in his last testament, where Bartholomew listed the important offices he had held. During this period, he founded a military order of knights whose purpose was to establish civil order throughout Italy.

He was appointed to the See of Nemonicum in Cyprus in 1248 (what city this was is unknown). While Louis IX of France was engaged upon his expedition against the Islamic forces ruling the Holy Land, Bartholomew joined the King and Queen at Jaffa, Sidon, and Acre—in the capacity of apostolic legate, according to some writers; his own account merely states that he visited the King and Queen at these places. King Louis desired him to make a visit to France, promising rich relics for his church, should he comply with the request.

In 1254, he was sent as legate to the courts of England and France and as Henry III of England was, at that time, in his realm in the Aquitaine, Bartholomew traveled there towards the close of that year, then accompanied the English king and queen to Paris. He was, on this occasion, presented by the King of France with a relic of the true Cross and a thorn from Jesus's crown of thorns, worn at his crucifixion. These he afterwards placed in the Dominican Church built by him at Vicenza which was known as the Church of the Crown.

Two years later, to ensure the presence of so distinguished a prelate at his own court, Pope Alexander IV made him Bishop of Vicenza. During his tenure of that see, Bartholomew was subject to the hostility of the local ruler Ezzelino III, a Ghibelline who was noted for the brutality of his rule and who was a strong opponent of papal power. It has been said that Bartholomew was named Latin Patriarch of Jerusalem, but this is doubtful, as his testament does not mention this.

He was venerated by the people and, according to the Bollandists, has always been honored with the title of "Blessed". In recognition of this, he was formally beatified in 1793. He wrote commentaries on scripture, was the reputed author of a commentary on the "Hierarchy" of Dionysius the Areopagite, of two volumes of sermons, and some smaller works. His feast day is observed within the Dominican Order on 27 October.
