= San Filippo Neri, Vicenza =

Church building in Vicenza, Italy

Coordinates: 45.54685°N 11.54241°E

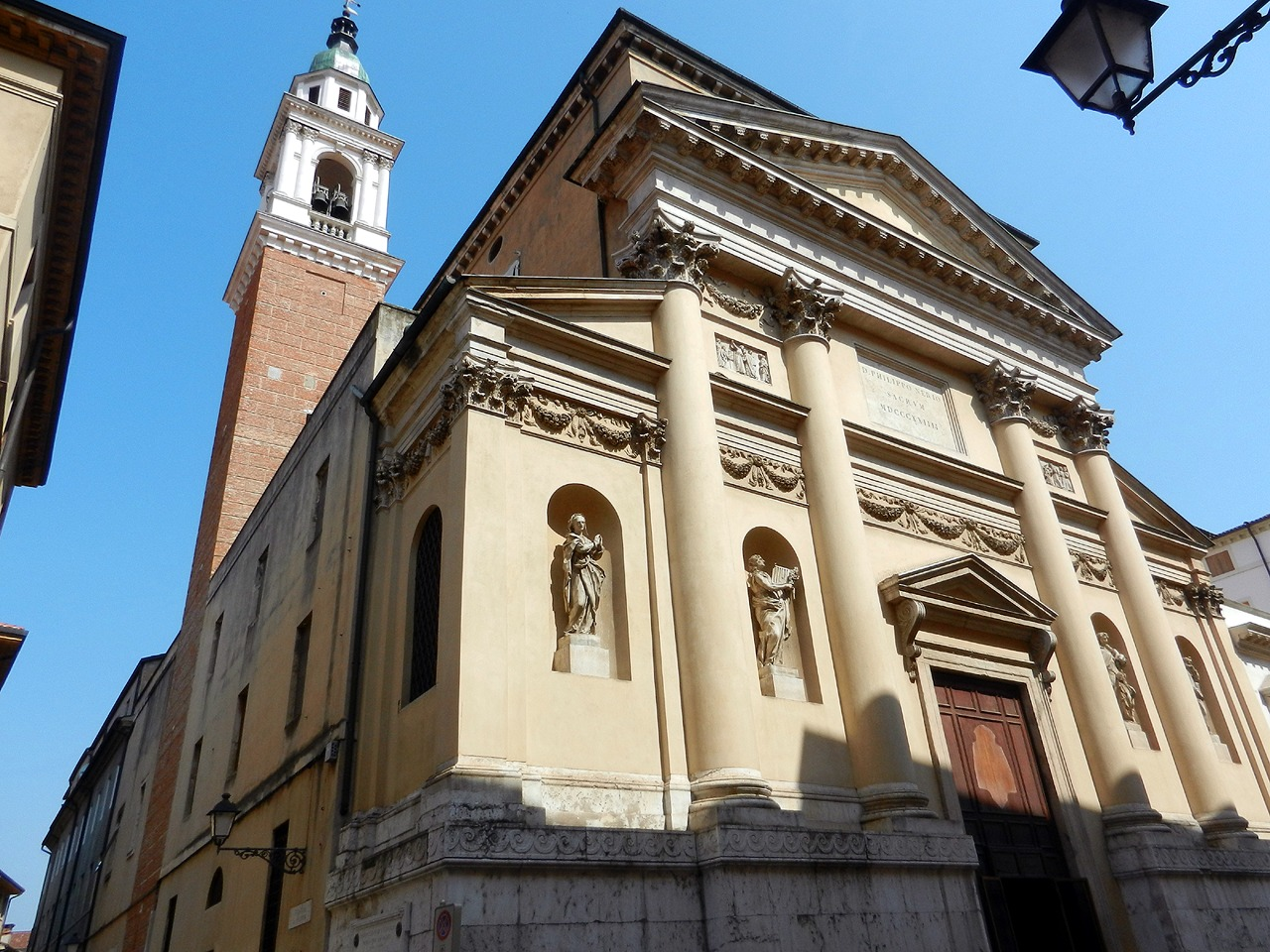
Facade of the church

San Filippo Neri, also called the Chiesa dei Filippini or San Marcello in San Filippo Neri, is a Neoclassical-style, Roman Catholic church located on Corso Palladio #35 in the city of Vicenza, region of Veneto, Italy.

== History ==
Members of the Oratory of Saint Philip Neri had arrived to Vicenza in 1658. They had failed to create their own church, but in 1719 were assigned by the then Bishop Sebastiano Venier to the Jesuit facilities here. The next year they were assigned a small church at this site belonging to the Jesuits, and in 1730 began construction of a larger church. The design was by Giorgio Massari. However, funding even by the citizenry was sparse, and construction was very slow. The presbytery was finished only in 1747, the nave started ten years later and, halted for a long time, completed with floors only in 1822. The church was consecrated on 15 May 1825 by the bishop Giuseppe Maria Peruzzi. The bell tower erected between 1838 and 1842. The architects Domenico Cerato and Antonio Piovene had reworked the designs of Giorgio Massari.

The church was suppressed in 1810 under Napoleonic rule, but reverted to becoming a church in a few decades. It has been a parish church since 1840, and now falls under belongs to the parish of San Marcello.

== Description ==
The facade has four statues in niches: depicting the Virgin and Charity, and Saints Lawrence and Paul. Inside, the decoration has a richer baroque bent. The statues depict the four evangelists and Christ the Redeemer, attributed to the studio of Orazio Marinali. Stucco plaques recount the story of St Phillip Neri. The organ was built by De Lorenzi-Zordan in 1833.

== References and Bibliography ==
- Franco Barbieri; Renato Cevese (2004). Angelo Colla editore (ed.). Vicenza, ritratto di una città. Vicenza. ISBN 8890099070.
- Giovanni Mantese (1982). Accademia Olimpica (ed.). Memorie storiche della Chiesa vicentina, V/1, Dal 1700 al 1866. Vicenza.
- Natalino Sottani (2014). Edizioni Rezzara (ed.). Cento chiese, una città. Vicenza.
- Renato Zironda, ed. (1991). La chiesa di San Filippo Neri a Vicenza. Guida storico artistica. Vicenza: Congregazione dell'Oratorio di San Filippo Neri.
- Giovanni Mantese, I 250 anni dei padri dell'Oratorio di S. Filippo Neri a Vicenza, in G. Mantese, Itinerario archivistico nella vita vicentina del primo Ottocento, Vicenza, 1986.
- Sebastiano Rumor, Origine e sviluppo della Congregazione dell'Oratorio di San Filippo Neri in Vicenza, Vicenza 1895.
