= Giovanni de Surdis Cacciafronte =

Italian catholic Bishop

Blessed Bishop Giovanni de Surdis Cacciafronte O.S.B.
- Bishop of Vicenza
- Church: Roman Catholic Church
- Diocese: Vicenza
- See: Vicenza
- Appointed: 1179
- Installed: 1179
- Term ended: 16 March 1184
- Predecessor: Ariberto
- Successor: Pistore
- Previous post: Bishop of Mantua (1174-1177)

Orders
- Consecration: 1174
- Rank: Bishop

Personal details
- Born: Giovanni de Surdis Cacciafronte; 1125 Cremona, Commune of Milan
- Died: 16 March 1184 (aged 58–59) Vicenza, Republic of Venice
- Buried: Cattedrale di Santa Maria Annunziata, Italy
- Denomination: Roman Catholic

Sainthood
- Feast day: 16 March; 9 July (Mantua)
- Venerated in: Roman Catholic Church
- Beatified: 30 March 1824; Saint Peter's Basilica, Papal States by Pope Leo XII
- Attributes: Benedictine habit; Episcopal attire; Palm
- Patronage: Diocese of Mantua; Diocese of Vicenza; Persecuted Christians

Giovanni de Surdis Cacciafronte (1125 - 16 March 1184) was an Italian Roman Catholic priest and bishop from the Order of Saint Benedict. He served as the Bishop of Mantua from 1174 until his resignation in 1177 and held the position of Bishop of Vicenza from 1179 until his murder. The schism that Antipope Victor IV caused enabled him to proclaim his support for Pope Alexander III though leading to his removal from a position at the behest of Frederick Barbarossa.

The beatification cause commenced in 1222 under Pope Honorius III and culminated on 30 March 1824, when his beatification received formal ratification from Pope Leo XII upon the confirmation of the late bishop's enduring local 'cultus' - or popular devotion.

== Life ==
Giovanni de Surdis Cacciafronte was born in 1125, in Cremona to the nobles Evangelista Sordi and Berta Persico. He lost his father as a child and his mother soon remarried the nobleman Adamo Cacciafronte who allowed his stepson to assume his surname and as such treated him as if he were his own child.

He was well-educated as a child and his desire to pursue the ecclesiastical life was well received at home. Cacciafronte entered the Order of Saint Benedict in 1141 at their convent of San Lorenzo in Cremona and was later ordained to the priesthood before being appointed as the prior of San Vittore - connected to San Lorenzo - and later being made as the abbot of San Lorenzo itself from 1155 until 1159. The schism that Antipope Victor IV caused - with the support of Frederick Barbarossa - caused the priest to affirm his ardent support of Pope Alexander III. He was banished from his convent after Barbarossa learned that he had supported the pope.

The pontiff did not fail to notice the priest's support and so appointed him as the Bishop of Mantua after his predecessor sided with the antipope. But his predecessor later returned repentant and requested to be Mantua's bishop once more. Cacciafronte sent his resignation to Alexander III and returned to hermitage life though the pontiff had other ideas in mind and instead made him the Bishop of Vicenza. One particular initiative of his was to revive public devotion to Ss. Felice and Fortunato and another was to repave roads. He also combatted the heretical Cathars. He also established a theological training school for seminarians in 1184 before his death.

Cacciafronte was killed on 16 March 1184. He had reprimanded Pietro - who had been embezzling in an illegal move - and encouraged him to repent though the angered Pietro took his sword and killed the bishop in a merciless encounter. His remains were interred in the Cattedrale di Santa Maria Annunziata though were relocated to a new tomb in that church in 1441.

== Beatification ==
The sainthood process commenced in 1222, when the late bishop's successor approached Pope Honorius III and requested such a cause open while the official process opened in 1223. The cause tried to resume its proceedings in 1647 under Pope Innocent X but failed though was reinvigorated in 1824.

The ratification of the late bishop's enduring and noted local 'cultus' - otherwise known as popular devotion - allowed for Pope Leo XII to issue his formal approval to the late bishop's beatification on 30 March 1824.
