= Michele Priuli =

1xth-century Catholic bishop

Most Reverend Michele Priuli
- Bishop of Vicenza
- Church: Catholic Church
- Diocese: Diocese of Vicenza
- In office: 1579–1603
- Predecessor: Matteo Priuli (bishop)
- Successor: Giovanni Delfino (seniore)
- Previous post: Apostolic Nuncio to Florence (1589–1591)

Personal details
- Born: Venice, Italy
- Died: 1603

Michele Priuli (died 1603) was a Roman Catholic prelate who served as Bishop of Vicenza (1579–1603) and Apostolic Nuncio to Florence (1589–1591).

== Biography ==
Michele Priuli was born in Venice, Italy.

On 3 August 1579, he was appointed Bishop of Vicenza by Pope Gregory XIII.

On 10 April 1589, he was appointed Apostolic Nuncio to Florence by Pope Sixtus V; he resigned from the position on 3 August 1591.

He served as Bishop of Vicenza until his death in 1603.

While bishop, he was the principal co-consecrator of Pietro Usimbardi, Bishop of Arezzo (1589).

== External links and additional sources ==
- Cheney, David M. "Diocese of Vicenza". Catholic-Hierarchy.org. (for Chronology of Bishops) ^{[self-published]}
- Chow, Gabriel. "Diocese of Vicenza". GCatholic.org. (for Chronology of Bishops) ^{[self-published]}
- Cheney, David M. "Nunciature to Florence (Tuscany)". Catholic-Hierarchy.org. ^{[self-published]}

Catholic Church titles
Preceded by Matteo Priuli (bishop)	Bishop of Vicenza; 1579–1603	Succeeded by Giovanni Delfino (seniore)
Preceded by Giovanni Francesco Mazza de' Canobbi	Apostolic Nuncio to Florence; 1589–1591	Succeeded by Carlo Montigli
