= Girolamo Priuli (17th century) =

Venetian patrician and genealogist

Girolamo (or Gerolamo) Priuli was a Venetian patrician and genealogist. In 1616, he compiled a complete genealogy of the Priuli, the Arbore della nobilissima Famiglia Priuli. It is known from two manuscripts. In 1619, he began writing the Pretiosi Frutti del Maggior Consiglio. He may have still been working on it into the early 1630s. It is preserved in the manuscript Museo Correr, Codici Cicogna MSS 3781-3 (formerly 2889-91). This manuscript is composed of three originally separate volumes assembled for Emmanuele Antonio Cicogna.
