= Matteo Priuli (cardinal) =

17th-century Catholic cardinal

His Eminence Matteo Priuli
- Cardinal-Priest of San Marco
- Church: Catholic Church

Personal details
- Born: 1577 Venice, Italy
- Died: 13 Mar 1624 (age 47)

Matteo Priuli (1577–1624) was a Roman Catholic cardinal.

Catholic Church titles
Preceded by Felice Centini	Cardinal-Priest of San Girolamo dei Croati; 1616–1621	Succeeded by Giovanni Delfino (seniore)
Preceded by Giovanni Delfino (seniore)	Cardinal-Priest of San Marco; 1621–1624	Succeeded by Pietro Valier
