= Matteo Priuli (bishop) =

16th-century Catholic bishop

Most Reverend Matteo Priuli
- Bishop of Cittanova
- Church: Catholic Church
- Diocese: Diocese of Vicenza
- In office: 1565–1579
- Predecessor: Giulio della Rovere
- Successor: Michele Priuli
- Previous post: Bishop of Novigrad (1561–1565)

Matteo Priuli (30 March 1528 - 3 April 1595) was a Roman Catholic prelate who served as Bishop of Vicenza (1565–1579) and Bishop of Emona, (1561–1565).

== Biography ==
On 5 September 1561, Matteo Priuli was appointed Bishop of Emona (Civitas Nova) by Pope Pius IV.

On 13 April 1565, Pius IV appointed him Bishop of Vicenza.

He served as Bishop of Vicenza until his resignation in 1579.

== Sources ==
- Cappelletti, Giuseppe (1854), Le chiese d'Italia. (in Italian). Volume decimo (10) Venezia. Giuseppe Antonelli, pp. 909-911.
- Riccardi, Tommaso (1786). Storia Dei Vescovi Vicentini (in Italian). Vicenza: Vendramini Mosca. pp. 202–205.

=== External links ===
- Cheney, David M. "Diocese of Novigrad (Cittanova)". Catholic-Hierarchy.org. (for Chronology of Bishops) ^{[self-published]}
- Chow, Gabriel. "Titular Episcopal See of Novigrad (Croatia)". GCatholic.org. (for Chronology of Bishops) ^{[self-published]}
- Cheney, David M. "Diocese of Vicenza". Catholic-Hierarchy.org. (for Chronology of Bishops) ^{[self-published]}
- Chow, Gabriel. "Diocese of Vicenza". GCatholic.org. (for Chronology of Bishops) ^{[self-published]}

Catholic Church titles
Preceded by Francesco Pisani	Bishop of Novigrad; 1561–1565	Succeeded by Francesco Pisani
Preceded by Giulio della Rovere	Bishop of Vicenza; 1565–1579	Succeeded by Michele Priuli
