= History of religious architecture in Vicenza =

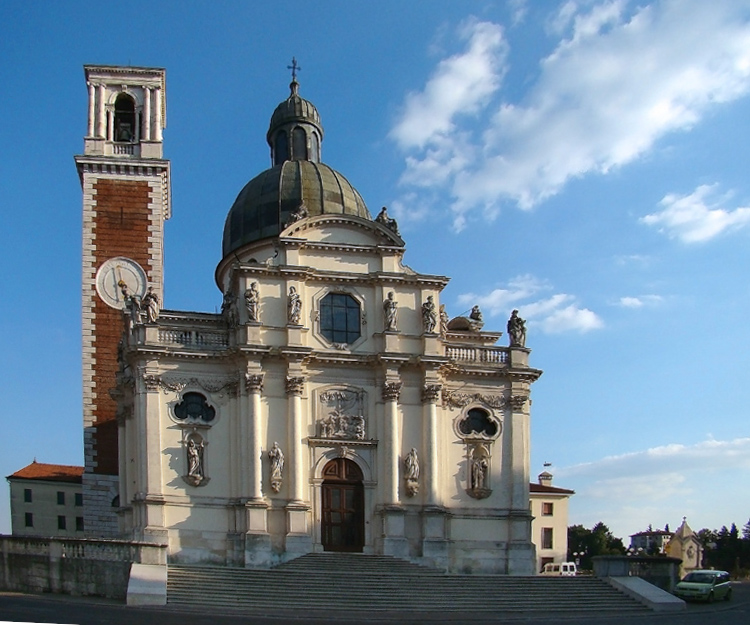
Monte Berico

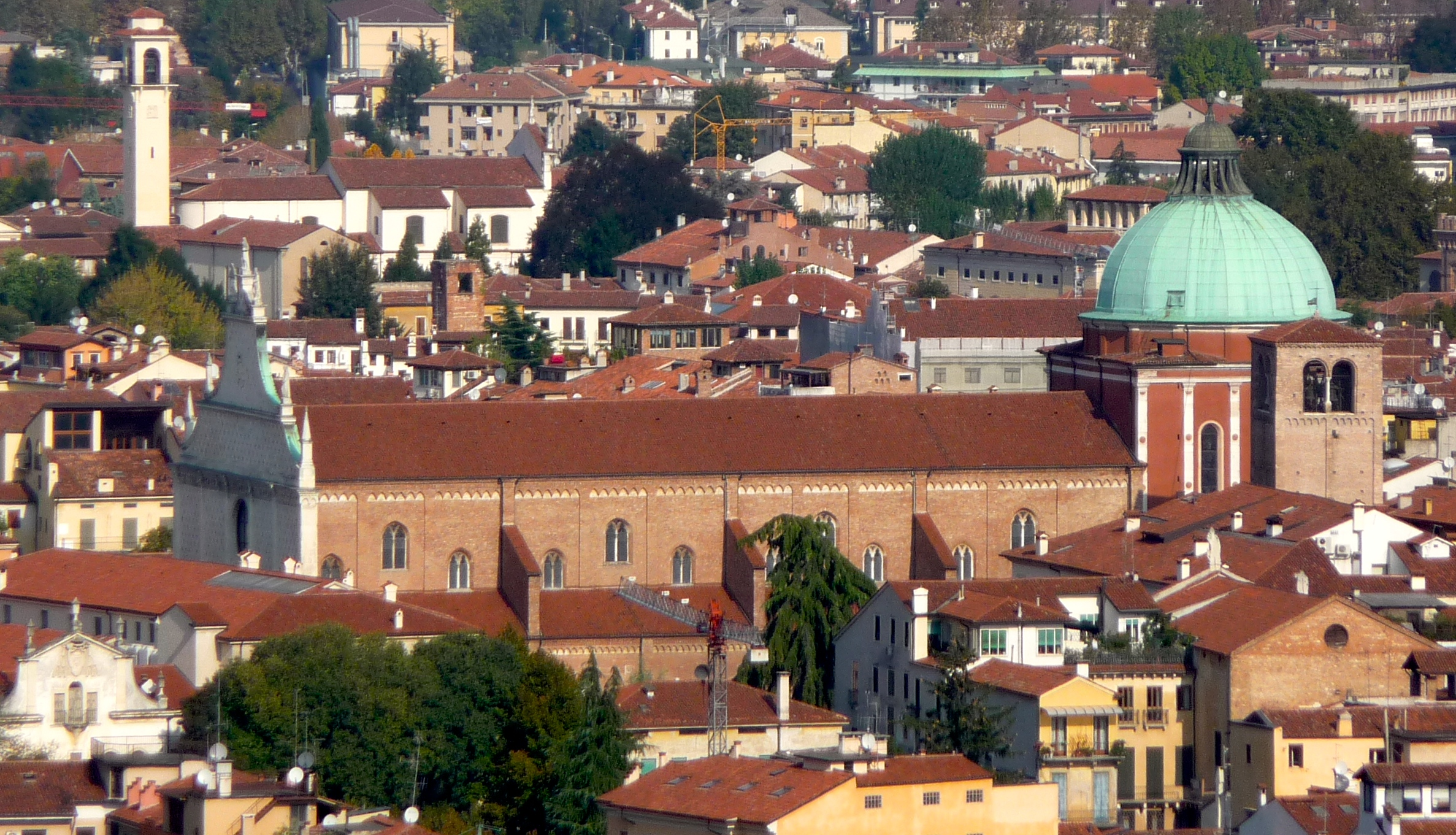
The cathedral of Santa Maria Annunciata in Vicenza's historic center, seen from Monte Berico.

The city of Vicenza is extremely rich in churches, monasteries, convents and other buildings intended for worship or religious activities, built during the seventeen centuries of Christian presence in the city.

Their history is not only about the vicissitudes of construction, renovations and additions, and then deconsecration and finally demolition; the history is about the people: the social, political and artistic context that characterized them; who commissioned these buildings and why; who financed their construction and implementation with works of art and piety; who earned income from them and appointed their rectors; and who was buried or remembered in them. It is only through the compilation of this variety of data that the history of a community can be understood through the study of religious buildings.

== Late ancient period ==
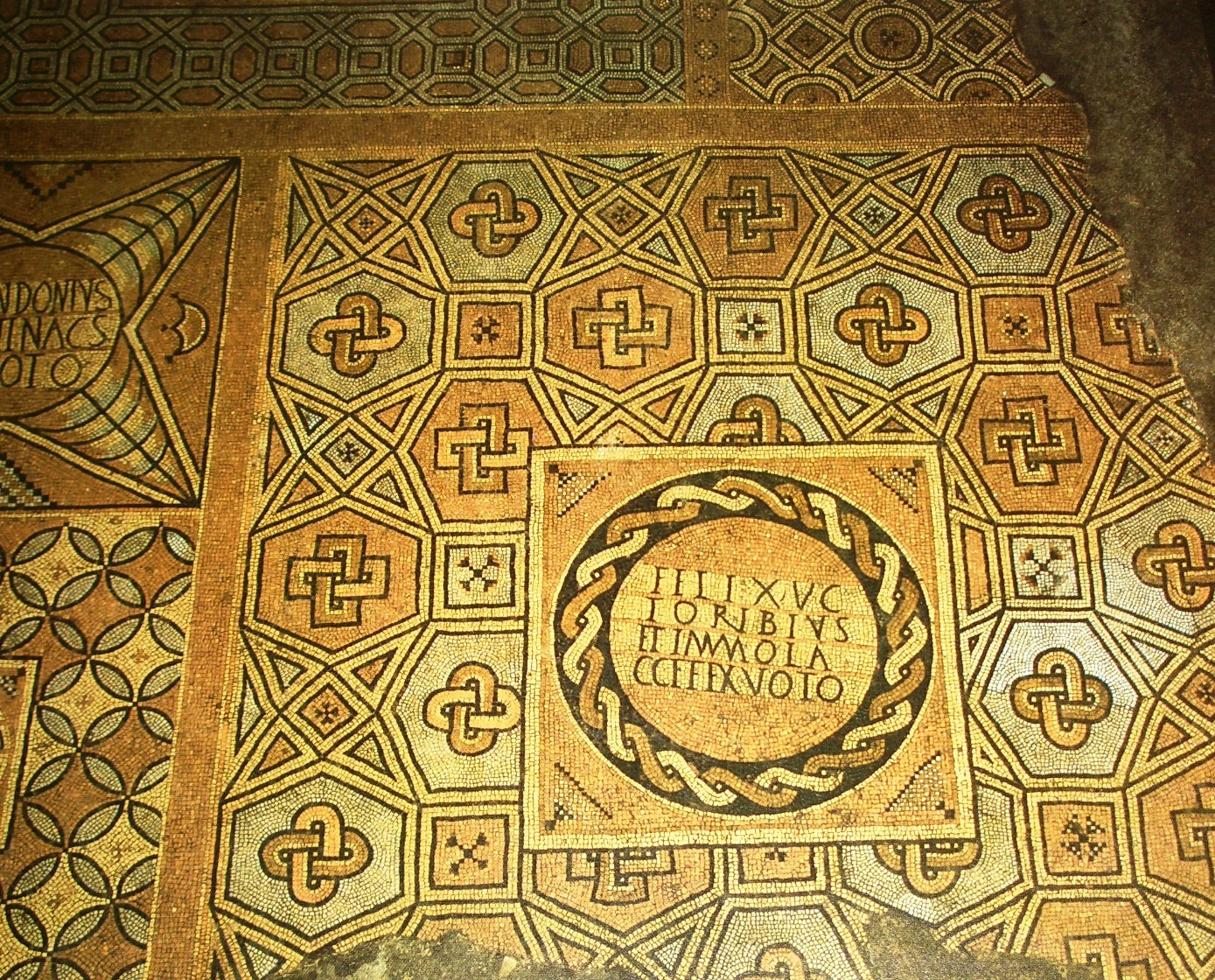
The mosaic in the center of the Basilica of Saints Felix and Fortunatus

The earliest churches in the city of Vicenza – of which there is evidence left to us and whose foundation dates back to the late 4th century – are the church of Santa Maria Annunciata and the Basilica of Saints Felix and Fortunatus, both of which have come down to us in their medieval, Renaissance and Baroque extensions and renovations. The former was the main church of the late Roman city and became its cathedral at the end of the 6th century, when the diocese of Vicenza was established; the latter was built in the existing cemetery area outside the city to house the remains of Vicenza's martyrs.

They were probably not the only places of worship in the city, but they are the only ones in which artifacts referring to the period can still be observed.

== Early Middle Ages ==
During the Early Middle Ages, and particularly after the construction of the city walls, there was a clear separation – also in the aspect of ecclesiastical organization – between the city, in which the bishop resided and officiated in the cathedral and on which the urban chapels depended, and the suburb outside the walls, practically all of which was entrusted to the Benedictine monks. Within the city there was only one baptismal font – in the cathedral – while in the suburb there were perhaps two other fonts, one in the basilica of San Felice and the other in the church of San Vito.

=== Structural and artistic features ===
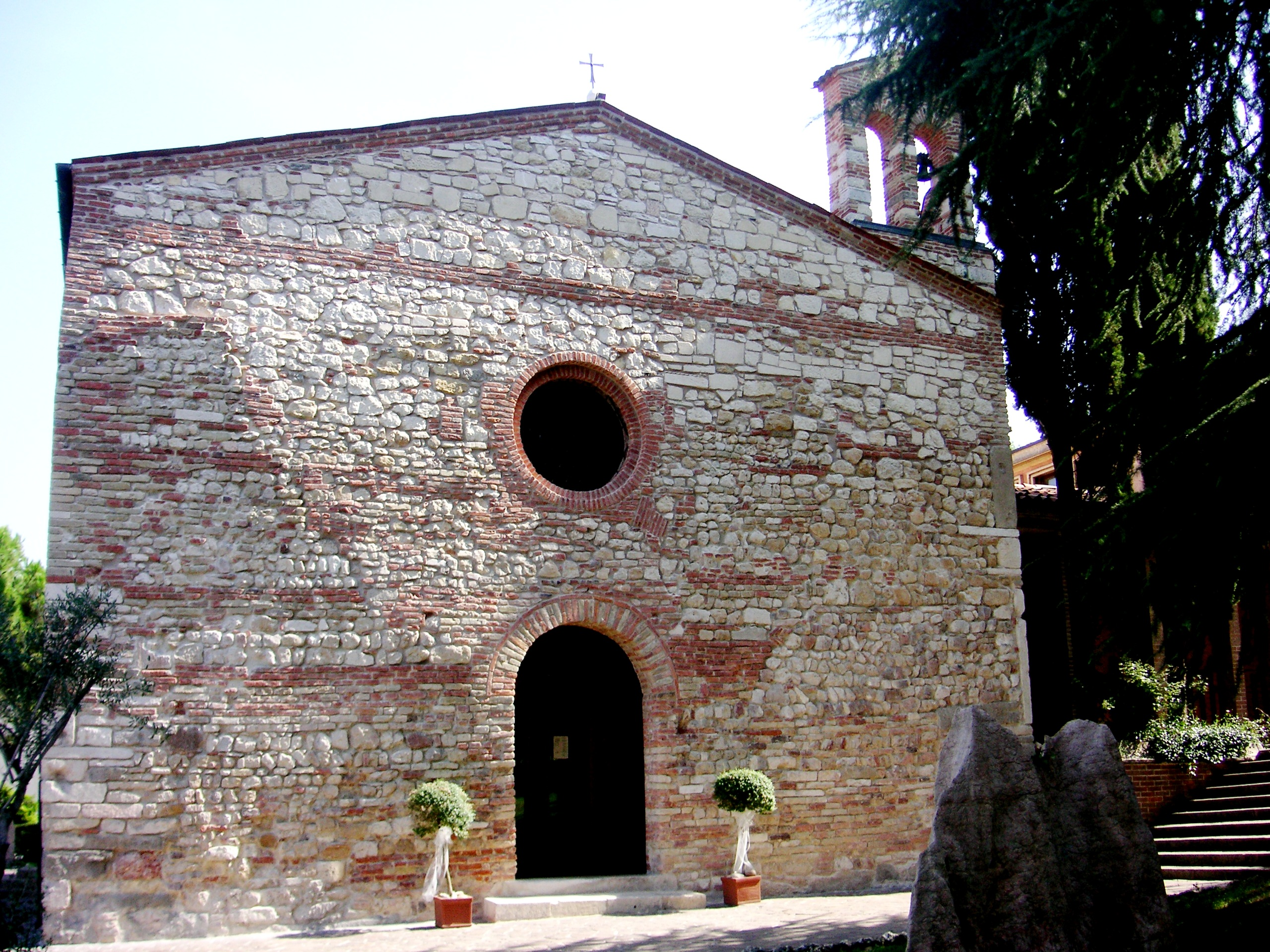
Church of St. George, facade

With the exception of the churches of the two main monasteries – St. Felix and St. Peter's – which were greatly altered in their structure over time, almost nothing remains of the small abbeys. Instead, there are still a few small churches – particularly well-preserved is that of St. George in Gogna – built in the pre-Romanesque or Romanesque style.

=== Cathedral and urban chapels ===
The cathedral represented the heart of not only religious but also civil life in the city: until the end of the 11th century, assemblies and solemn ceremonies were held there. The seat of power, as well as the basilica of St. Felix, was involved and severely damaged in factional clashes around the year 1000; after further damage from the 1117 earthquake, it was again repaired and renovated. To make it safer, the interior was divided into five naves, doubling the rows of pillars that had been erected in the 8th century.

There is a lack of documents from the first millennium attesting to the number, denomination and time when the oldest minor churches in the city were built; the earliest that records them is a bull of Pope Urban III from 1186, in which all the donations made to them the previous year by Bishop Pistore were confirmed to the canons of the cathedral. Their list is repeated in the Register of Rationes Decimarum in the Vatican Archives referring to the years 1297-1303. These are the seven urban chapels: St. Paul's, Saints Philip and James, St. Marcellus, St. Eleutherius, St. Stephen, St. Mark, and Saints Faustinus and Jovita.

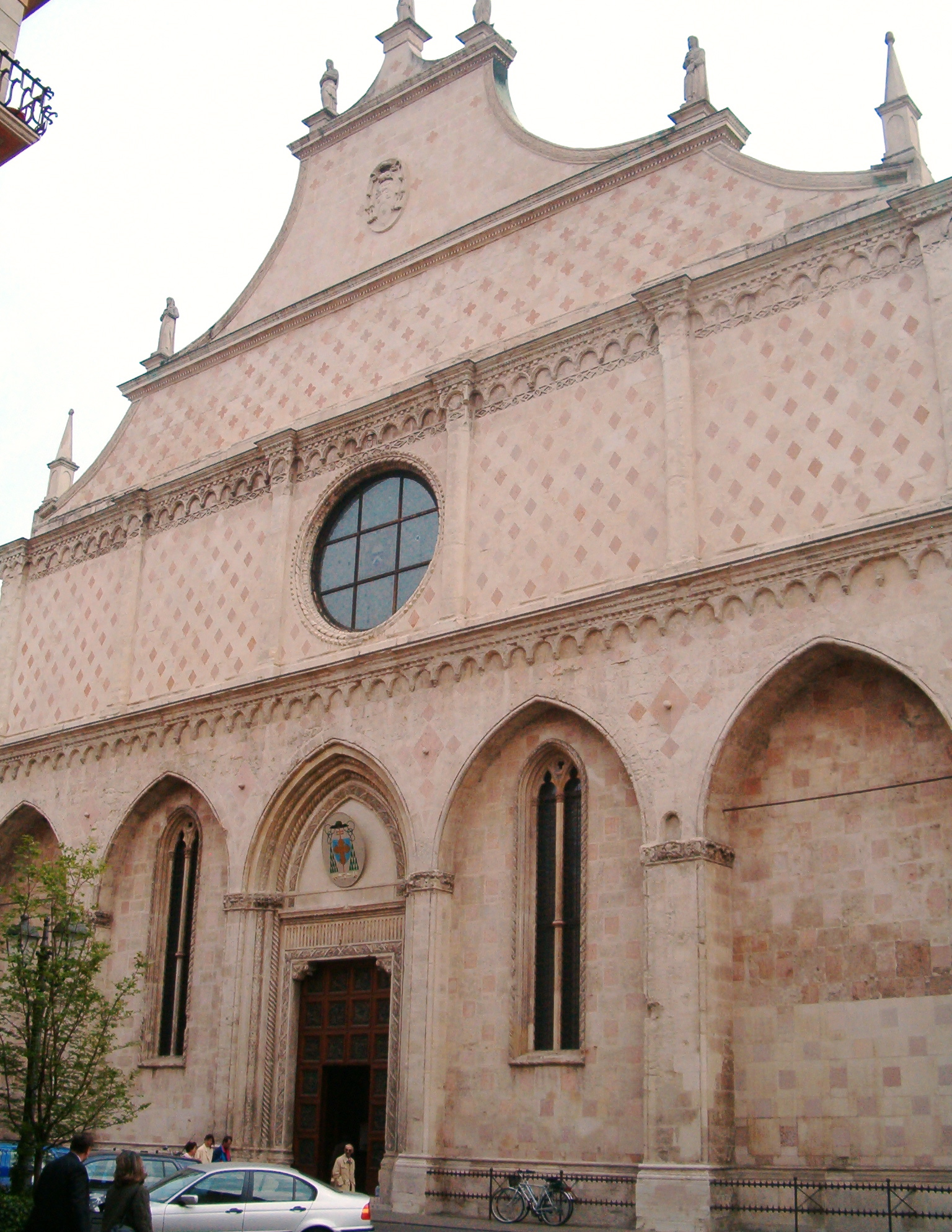
Façade of the Cathedral of Santa Maria Annunciata

These are secondary churches dependent on the cathedral, and their designation as chapels, typical of the Carolingian era, suggests that they existed as early as the 8th-9th centuries or were even earlier, as might be suggested by their dedications, all to martyred saints from the first three centuries. After the reform of Bishop Pistore in 1185, the owners of the chapels were the canons of the cathedral chapter, who benefited from the income produced by the crops outside the city walls.

In early medieval times the number of minor churches existing in the city was almost certainly greater than seven, but these were probably the most important churches; the number was also symbolic, as it corresponded to that of the ancient stationary churches of the Easter cycle.

After 1200 they became parish seats – though without the baptismal font, which remained the only one in the cathedral – and remained so until the Napoleonic suppression, from which only St. Stephen's, which had been completely rebuilt a century earlier, was spared. Transferred to the municipal property, they were later demolished – with the exception of the church of San Faustino, now destined for Cinema Odeon – and there is no further trace of them.

=== Benedictine monasteries ===
Of considerable importance from the Lombard period and throughout the early Middle Ages were the churches attached to Benedictine monasteries – places of worship frequented by people, often even more so than diocesan churches – built outside the city walls.

==== Male monasteries ====
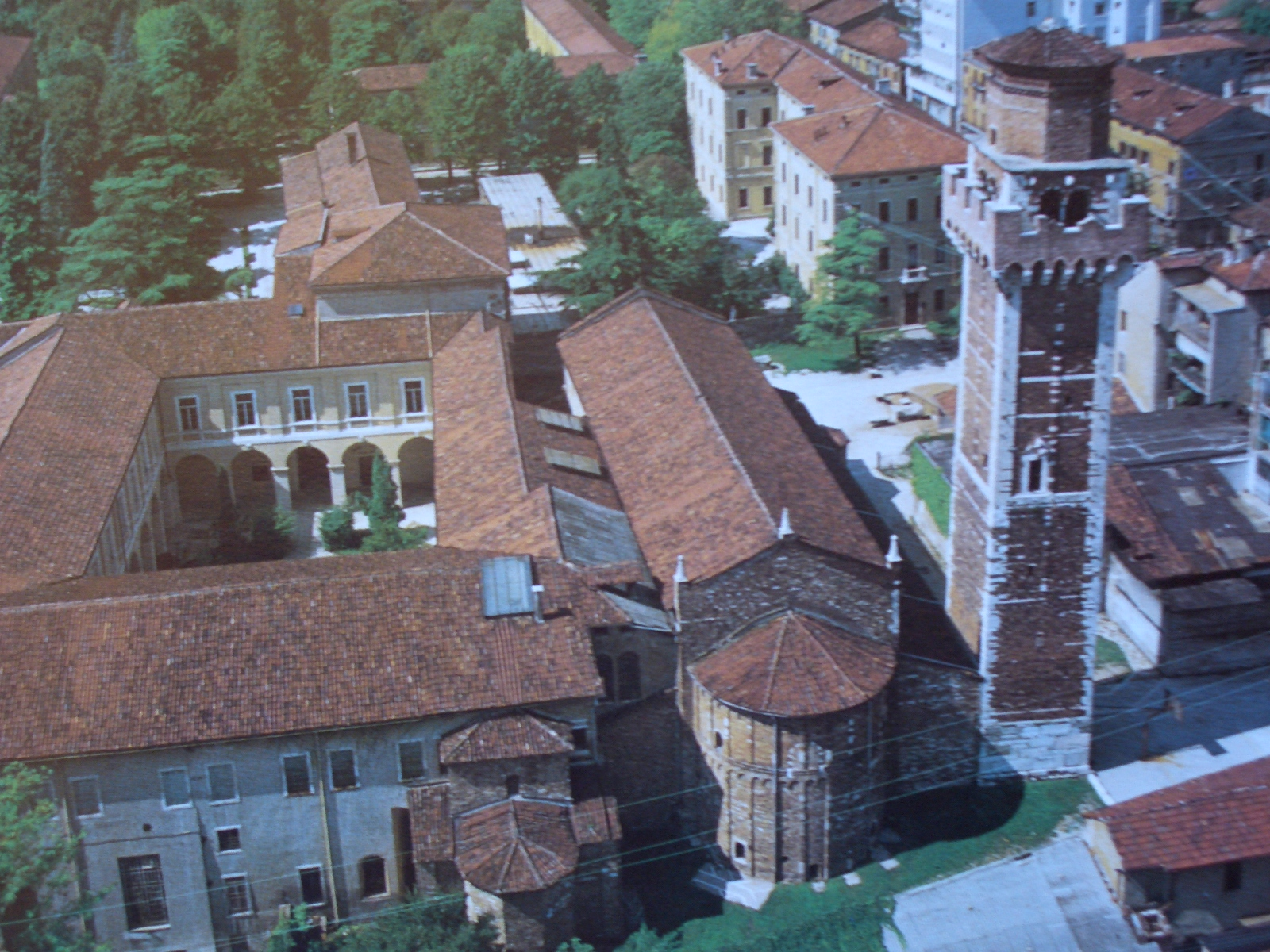
Aerial view of the former monastery (left), the basilica of Saints Felix and Fortunatus (center) and the bell tower (right)

The most prominent Benedictine center was the Abbey of Saints Felix and Fortunatus (also named, according to Benedictine custom, after Saints Vitus and Modestus), which possessed vast churches and buildings, estates and curtes throughout the Vicenza area, recognized to it by the Privilegium of Bishop Rudolf in 983 and confirmed by Bishop Jerome in 1001. The monks, who probably settled in Vicenza around 750, quickly spread throughout the territory, taking on the task of reclaiming marshy land.

Two very ancient chapels dependent on the Benedictines of San Felice were that of Monte Berico, whose name is unknown and that of San Pietro in Vivarolo, part of the monastery inhabited by Benedictine nuns until 1400. From a diploma of Conrad II the Salic from 1026 it is known that around 926 King Hugh of Provence and his son Lothair also donated to the bishop of Vicenza the two abbeys of San Salvatore and San Vito.

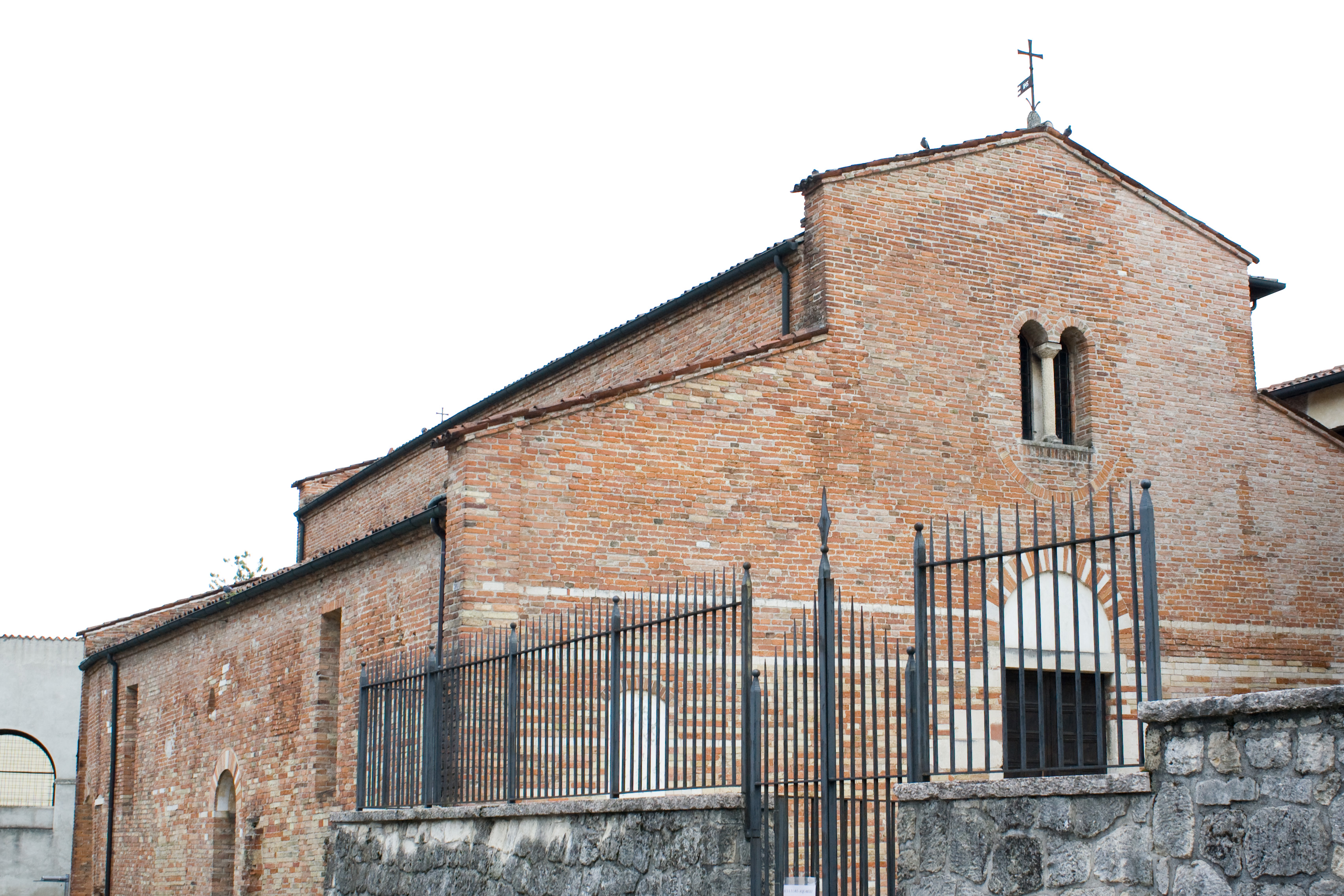
The church of the monumental complex of San Silvestro, in its 13th-century appearance.

The monastery of San Silvestro in Borgo Berga, which depended on the Benedictine abbey of Nonantola and had other dependencies in the Vicenza area, was also Benedictine.

==== Women's monasteries ====
Particularly important for the religious life that took place there, for the privileges granted by the bishops and for the possessions was the women's monastery of San Pietro, built in the first half of the 9th century on the site of a very old chapel (and where the parish church of the same name exists today). Very close to the city, which it accessed via the bridge over the Bacchiglione River (now Ponte degli Angeli, at that time San Pietro bridge), it was the hub of the first suburb (or perhaps the second after Borgo Berga) that had begun to develop outside the walls.

Dependent on the monastery of St. Peter were the two ancient churches of Sant'Andrea and San Vitale and yet another, also dedicated to St. Peter, which stood at the top of the Scalette.

== Late Middle Ages ==
The second half of the 12th century saw a general decadence of religious life – both in the parishes and in the Benedictine monasteries – with the consequence, from the point of view of religious architecture, of a general decay of even diocesan churches and monasteries. This decadence continued throughout the mid-13th century; no attempt at church reform had any effect, at a time when the city's bishops were engaged more in defending the ecclesiastical patrimony than anything else and Vicenza was subjugated by the signoria of Ezzelino III da Romano, who manifested Cathar sympathies. A decadence barely mitigated by the rise, here and there, of modest religious communities of lay people.

Renewal came after the fall of the tyrant, under the episcopate of Bartholomew of Breganze, who wanted to erect a new symbolic center of the city's faith, the church of Santa Corona. But Bishop Bartholomew's innovative thrust was short-lived – not least because the city soon fell under external lordships – and an ever-increasing gap was created between the local hierarchy, expressed by these lordships and effectively absent from the city, and the people.

The commune and the city aristocracy then took on the task of interpreting and sustaining the piety and religious devotion of the population, including by fostering and financing the construction of the three large churches and related convents of the mendicant orders that had settled in the city during the thirteenth century. This interest was not without symbolic significance: at the end of the fourteenth century the municipality had the church of St. Vincent built in the main square, declared patron saint of the city, dependent on its authority and not on the diocese.

=== Structural and artistic features ===
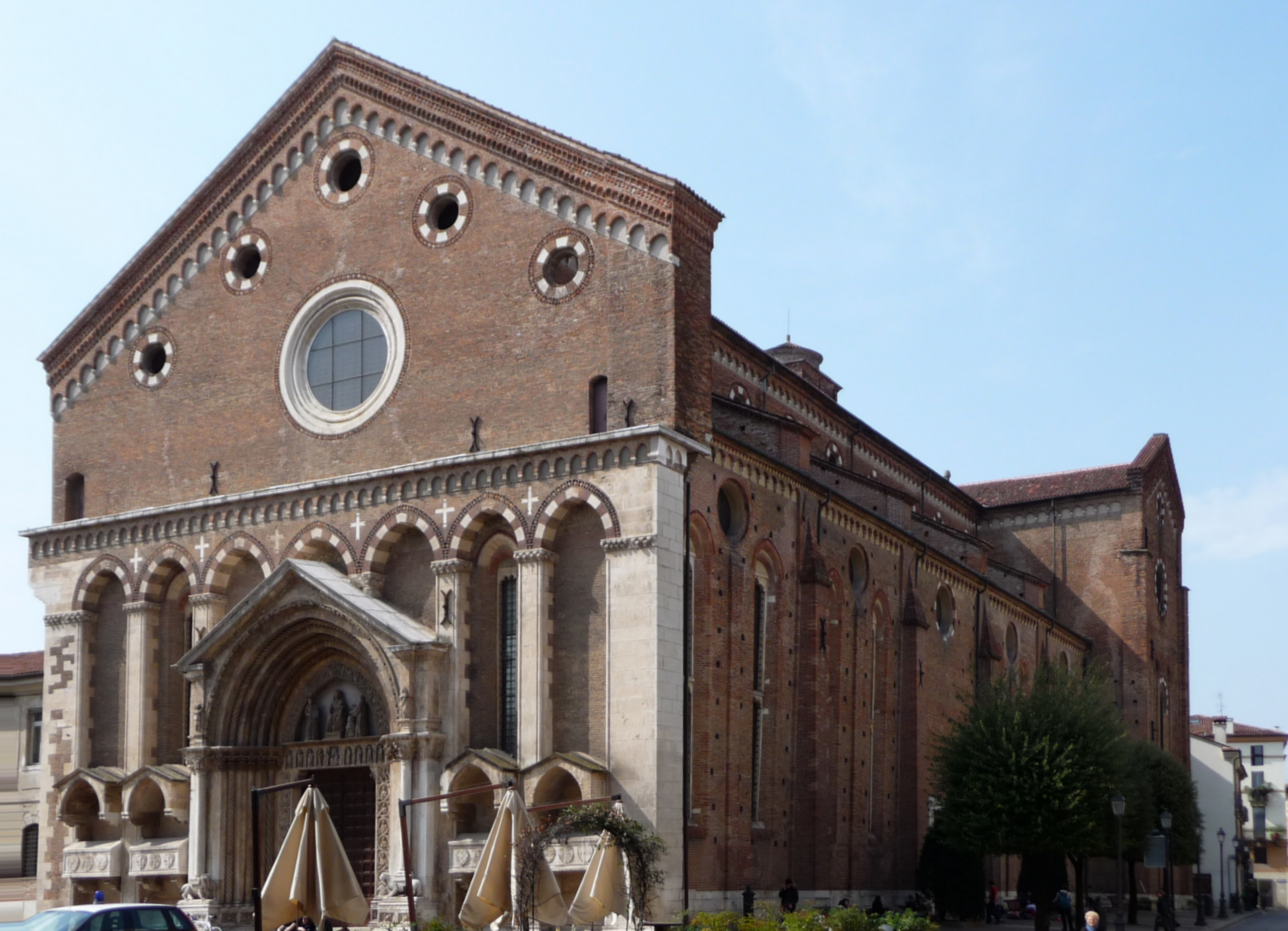
The church of San Lorenzo, in Lombard Gothic style.

The churches of the thirteenth century were built in the Lombard Gothic style – a compromise between Romanesque and Gothic, without excessive leaps in height, with the preservation of the gabled façade and wall masses – according to the Cistercian layout: Latin cross plan, with three naves ending in rectangular apses.

Only later, beginning in the 14th century, was the strict style softened and the naves began to be enriched with chapels and side altars; at the end of the 15th century the apses became semicircular, according to the Renaissance trend. But by then churches had become the place where the prestige and aesthetics of the ruling families were celebrated.

=== Communities and churches of secular groups ===
Towards the end of the 12th century, fraternities of laymen sprang up in the territory of Vicenza who practiced communal life, supported themselves with their work and often ran xenodochia or small hospices. To accomplish this, they obtained in concession – from the monastery of San Felice or the canons of the cathedral – chapels and buildings that they restored.

From ancient documents it is known of settlements at the hospice of Lisiera and at the church of San Nicolò di Nunto (today Olmo di Creazzo); others settled at the church of San Desiderio (today Sant'Agostino) and still others at the formerly Benedictine church of San Biagio Vecchio.

In Vicenza, a community of Humiliati settled in Borgo Berga just outside the early medieval walls at the end of the 12th century, founding the convent of Ognissanti in 1215 and the church of Santa Caterina in 1292.

Within a few years of their establishment, however, all of these lay communities, either because they were considered dangerous to orthodoxy or criticized for their lifestyle, were dissolved or regularized, and the buildings were taken back by the Church, which granted them to religious orders of more certain orthodoxy, such as the Canons Regular or the Observant Franciscans.

=== Convents and churches of the mendicant orders within the walls ===
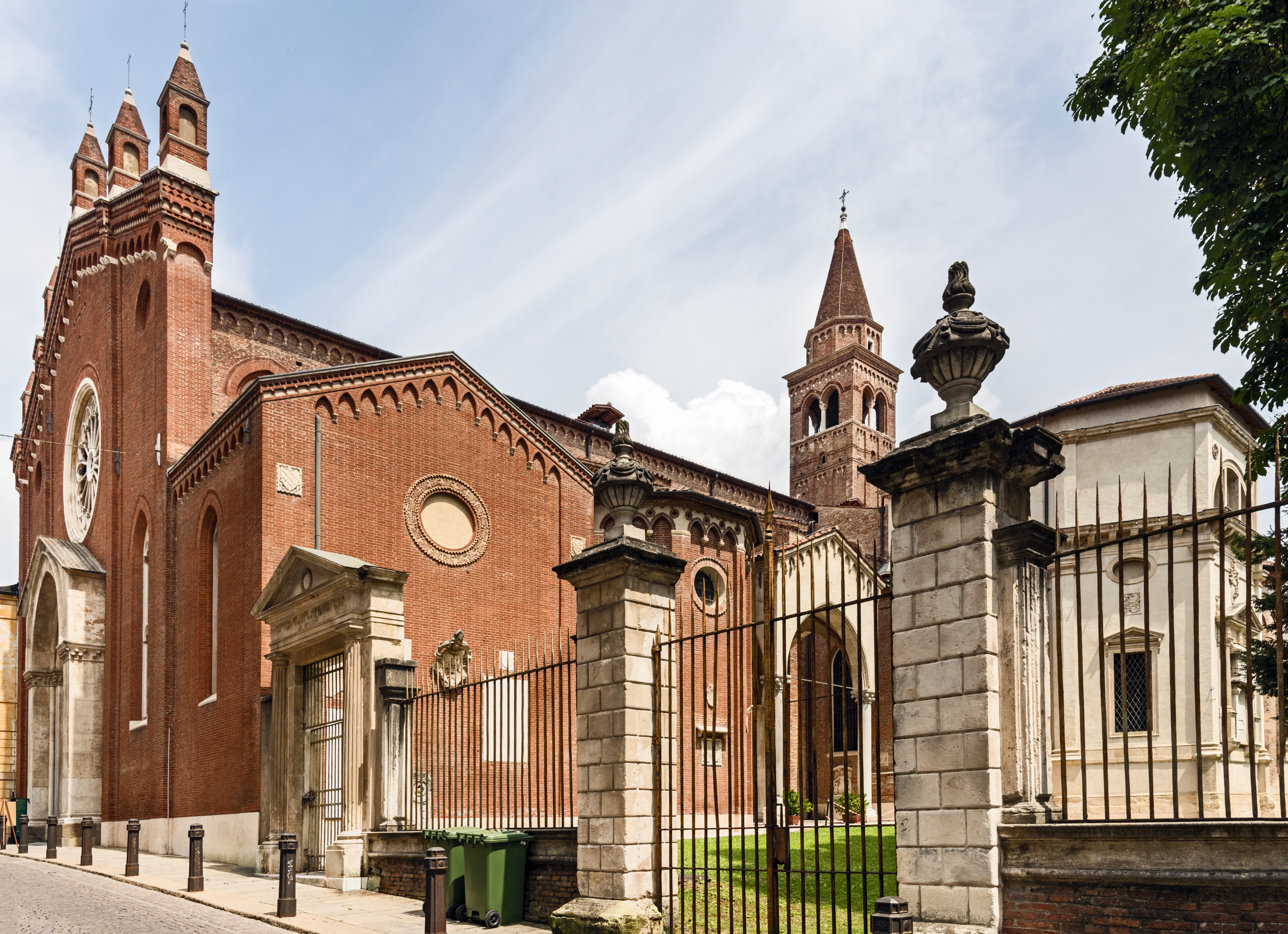
Façade and side of the church of Santa Corona

In the second half of the 13th century, as soon as the tyranny of Ezzelino III da Romano ended, the Mendicant Orders spread rapidly in Vicenza. Unlike the Benedictine monks, their purpose was to evangelize the cities, so each built its own large church in one of the sectors of the city, within the walled enclosure near one of the gates opened in the walls.

Between 1260 and 1270 Bishop Bartholomew of Breganze, supported by donations from the municipality and private citizens, had the church of Santa Corona built in the northeast sector not far from the Porta San Pietro gate and entrusted it to the Dominicans.

In 1266 the canons of the cathedral donated to the Hermits of St. Augustine the chapel of San Lorenzo in Berga, which they had received from Bishop Pistore in 1185. The Augustinians incorporated it into the construction – near the Porta di Mezzo or Berga Gate – of the church dedicated to St. Michael, thus extending their de facto jurisdiction over the southeastern sector of the city.

The presence of the Franciscans in Vicenza most likely dates back to the time when their founder was still living, perhaps 1216; his passage through the city, however, is not documented. It appears that in 1222 they officiated at the church of San Salvatore, the location of which is unclear, whether in the Contrà Carpagnon or in the Contrà later renamed San Francesco Vecchio, in any case near the episcope.

In 1232 they built the church of San Francesco Vecchio, which in 1289 they exchanged with the canons of the cathedral for that of San Lorenzo (one of the ancient seven chapels). From 1280 to 1300 they built the large church of St. Lawrence near the Porta Nova in the northwest sector of the city. This church, too, was built with considerable contributions provided by private individuals and the municipality, in part derived from the confiscation of heretics' property: in this period, in fact, the Franciscans were entrusted with the office of the Inquisition.

The southwest sector of the city remained the responsibility of the cathedral, which was also renovated in the second half of the 13th century.

The last of the mendicant orders to make its appearance in Vicenza was the Carmelites, introduced by Bishop Giovanni de Surdis around 1370. They were entrusted with the new church of San Giacomo Maggiore (Carmini), which was built at the expense of the same bishop and opened for worship in 1373 in the new Borgo di Porta Nova, which the Scaligeri incorporated into the city with a new walled enclosure and which quickly became populated with poor people, thus requiring the creation of a new parish entrusted, precisely, to these religious.

=== Convents and churches outside the walls ===
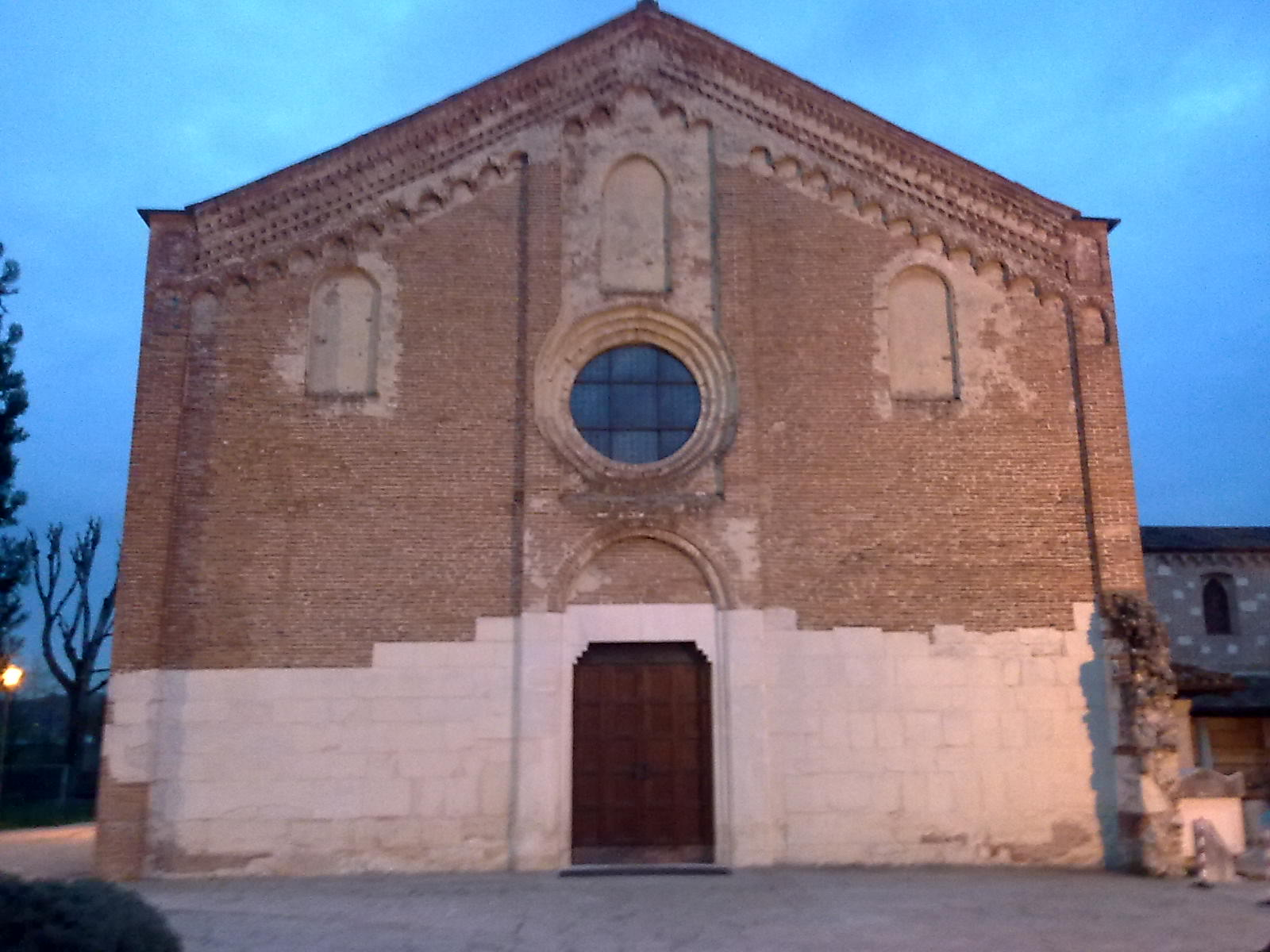
Abbey of St. Augustine

Also during the late Middle Ages, other convents and churches – often belonging to the female branch of the Mendicant Orders – were built in the immediate vicinity of the city. Nuns, held to seclusion, did not have the same goals of evangelization as men's convents and so their monasteries were built in greater isolation, outside the walls.

In Borgo San Pietro, the house of the Dominican nuns with the adjoining church of St. Dominic were built around 1264.

New male or mixed convents were also added to them.

In 1244 Bishop Manfredo dei Pii ordered the Franciscan nuns, who lived at the church of Sancta Maria Mater Domini in Longare, to move to the city to build a monastery on the site where the small church of Santa Maria ad Cellam, mentioned as early as the mid-12th century, already existed.

In 1220 the Canons Regular of St. Augustine of the Congregation of St. Mark in Mantua – who had been officiating since 1217 at the church attached to the convent of St. Bartholomew, where they had their headquarters in Borgo Pusterla – obtained from the canons of the cathedral the right to build an oratory, and the following year from the municipality the church and convent of St. Thomas in Pra de Valle in Borgo Berga, which for a couple of centuries housed both friars and nuns.

On the initiative of a certain Giacomo, son of Ser Cado, who wanted to adopt the rule of St. Augustine, between 1323 and 1357 the church of the same name – perhaps the most important artistic monument of Vicenza's 14th century – was built on the site previously occupied by the small church of San Desiderio.

The construction of an oratory in the village of San Vito, in the area now occupied by the present church of Santa Lucia, also dates back to the 14th century. The inhabitants of the hamlet, which was developing in this century, bought a house to be used as an oratory and handed it over to the Camaldolese who resided in the nearby abbey of San Vito; by the end of the century an actual church had been erected, of which, however, neither the size nor the value is known, having been completely rebuilt in the next two centuries.

=== Hospices ===
During the thirteenth century, as a result of a heightened sensitivity to the poor and the suffering and the new mobility, numerous hospices flourished on the outskirts of the city – at first mainly outside the walls, later also inside. They did not, like modern hospitals, have specific health care purposes, despite their affinity with the present name. The hospice was a domus hospitalis, also called domus Dei, whose function was to house the pauperes Christi, that is, orphans, the outcast, widows, the old, the sick without any means of assistance and, above all, pilgrims. Although they were not religious buildings in the strict sense, almost all of them were built and attached to churches, chapels or convents and were run by religious or, in some cases, lay people who intended to practice the Christian virtue of mercy.

A 1299 will mentions the hospices of San Salvatore in Carpagnon and those of Santa Croce and San Biagio, San Lazzaro, Misericordia in Borgo San Felice, and Santi Apostoli and Santa Caterina in Borgo Berga. By the date of 1316, when this will was executed, the hospices of Santa Croce, San Salvatore and Santi Apostoli are no longer named – and thus perhaps no longer existed. Instead, the Domus Dey de porta Sanctii Petri, i.e., today's St. Julian's, is mentioned, which would in time become one of the most important hospices and which still exists as a rest home for sick elderly people.

From rare mentions in other documents one learns that at that time there were also other hospices outside the city: that of Lisiera and another at the now vanished church of St. Francis "picciolo". In the 13th and 14th centuries, the need to give shelter to those suffering from contagious diseases, such as leprosy and plague, increased: thus the old hospices for pilgrims at San Nicola di Olmo and San Giorgio in Gogna – the latter only in case of epidemics – were destined to meet these needs, while the leprosarium of San Lazzaro was built ex novo.

During the 14th century, when the city was developing and new suburbs were about to be incorporated into the Scaliger walls, new hospices were also created inside, such as those of San Marcello around 1320-30, Sant'Antonio Abbate in 1350, and Santi Ambrogio e Bellino in Borgo di Porta Nova in 1384.

== From the 15th century to the second half of the 16th century ==
Throughout the Middle Ages, civil and religious authority were considered two expressions of a single society; however, they were two distinct authorities, very often fighting with each other for the management of power – mirroring the struggles between papacy and empire – and for the possession of large estates. This had not prevented moments of cooperation, such as when the Commune had supported the building of the churches of the mendicant orders.

In the modern age, however, during the four centuries of the city's submission to the Serenissima, collaboration was the rule. With the exception of the first half of the 16th century, when the Vicenza Episcopal See remained vacant and was ruled by apostolic administrators appointed by the Holy See, practically all the bishops of Vicenza were not only appointed by the Senate of the Venetian Republic, but also identified from among members of the families of the Venetian patriciate.

Thus was reproduced, even on the mainland, the climate of the Patriarchate of Venice: a protected and supported Church, but also functional to ducal power. Vicenza's noble families were no different from the Venetian ones in collaborating with the ecclesiastical hierarchy, to which they also gave numerous scions: male sons became ecclesiastics endowed with benefices and females entered the convent bringing with them a good dowry.

This permanent intertwining of civil and religious society found its most visible expression in religious architecture. Churches were filled with altars and chapels of patrician families – intended to house the funerary urns and monuments of their most distinguished members – desired by them and financed through testamentary bequests. Along with architectural structures, works of art with religious subjects multiplied; the demand for statues and ornaments with the use of stone and precious marble, canvases for altarpieces and frescoes attracted artisans and artists from other cities of the Republic or other Italian states and gave rise to local workshops. The best known of these was the stone workers' workshop of Pedemuro San Biagio, in which Andrea Palladio was trained.

=== Votive churches and family chapels ===
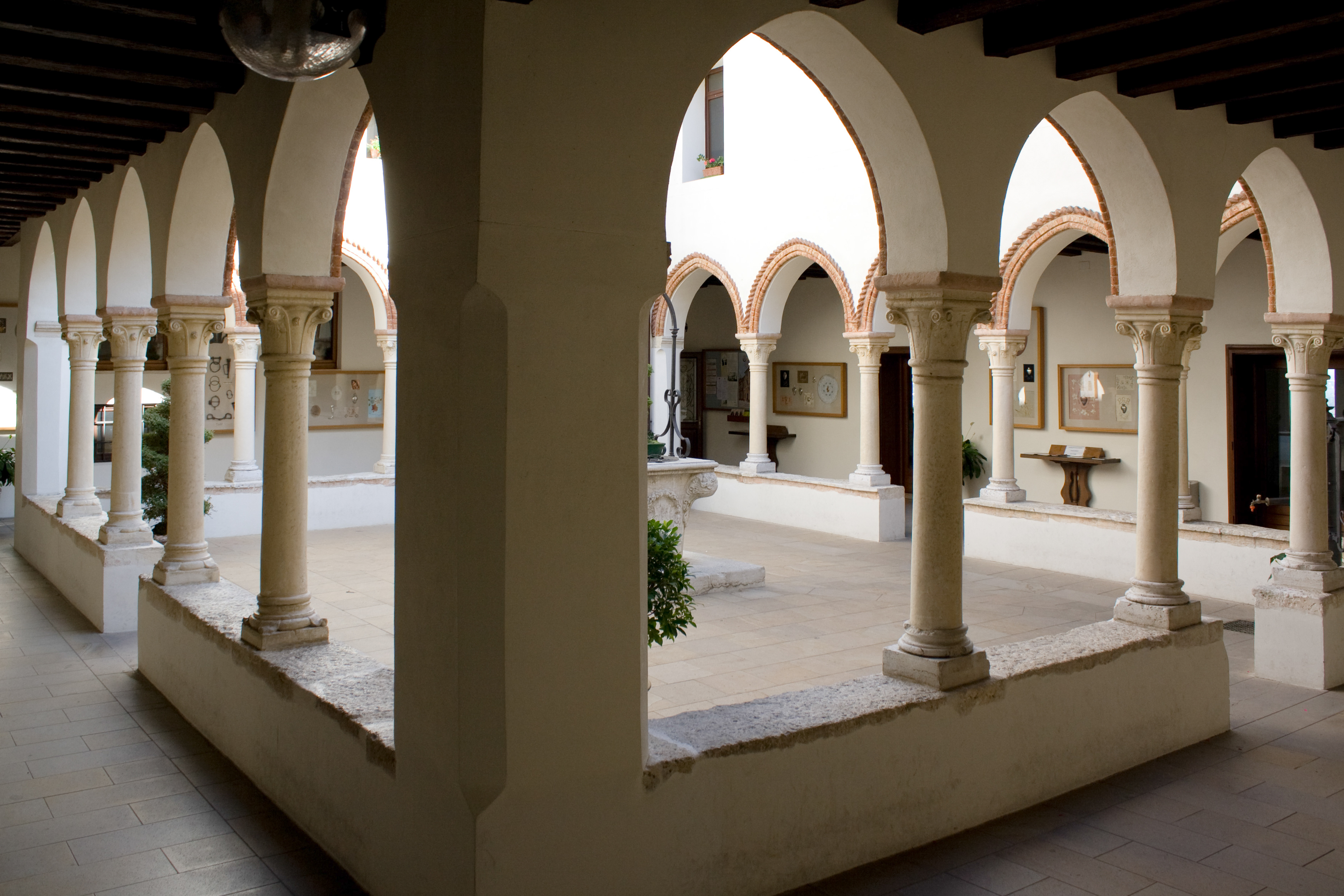
The late Gothic cloister of the Sanctuary of the Madonna of Monte Berico.

In this climate, the municipality itself became the interpreter and representative of popular religiosity, functional to the stability of the system. In 1428 it supported, even more than Bishop Pietro Emiliani, the city's efforts to build the first church of Monte Berico in the late Gothic style, as fulfillment requested by the Madonna who appeared to Vincenza Pasini. It was not the only church erected during this century as a vow to ward off the plague: the churches of San Rocco and San Sebastiano were also built for the same reason.

In the last two decades of the 15th century the architect Lorenzo da Bologna carried out considerable activity, called to the city by the most important noble families, such as the Trissino and the Valmarana, the Barbaran, the Da Porto, and the Thiene, who wanted to build chapels intended for the burial of their most illustrious members. He directed, in particular, the renovation of the apses of the cathedral and the church of Santa Corona. He also oversaw the renovation of the cloister in the monastery of San Bartolomeo.

=== Benedictine monasteries in the early modern age ===
At the beginning of the 15th century the Benedictine monasteries were in a state of extreme decay. That of San Felice was practically deserted – in 1430 not a single monk lived there – and the monasteries dependent on it, namely Santa Maria Maddalena, San Biagio Vecchio and San Pietro in Vivarolo were as well. While the main abbey in 1463 was united with the Congregation of St. Justine of Padua, which revitalized it, those dependent on it in the course of the century were transferred to other religious congregations. The history of these centuries is thus, for these monasteries, one of continuous attempts at reactivation and reconstruction.

San Biagio Vecchio, abandoned by the Benedictines who had concentrated in the monastery of Santa Chiara in Borgo Berga, was granted in 1421 to the Observants, who inhabited it for about a century and then moved to San Biagio Nuovo. The abandonment of the old monastery – quite decadent at that time – was decided by the Serenissima, to implement a plan to fortify the city, in an area considered of strategic interest after the devastating war of the League of Cambrai.

San Pietro in Vivarolo passed to the Hieronymites of Fiesole, who permanently suppressed the Benedictine rule there and for almost forty years worked to rebuild the monastery and church, which was reconsecrated in 1471 and at that point was named after St. Jerome; they, however, abandoned it in 1494, when they entered the city to build the church and monastery of Santa Maria delle Grazie. St. Peter's remained almost abandoned – for a short time three religious of the Servants of Mary lived there – after which, heavily damaged during the war of the League of Cambrai, the state of abandonment was total: that is how St. Ignatius of Loyola found it when he stayed there with some companions in 1537. In 1567 Pope Pius V granted it to the Capuchins, who had to rebuild the church and much of the monastery.

The monastery of Santa Maria Etiopissa, dependent on the Abbey of Pomposa, was also in a state of neglect and decay at the end of the 14th century, but in the last years of the century there was some recovery, with the restoration of the church and cloister.

Also in a state of absolute decay was the monastery of San Silvestro, dependent on the abbey of Nonantola, to the point that in 1464 it was given in commendam first to an external abbot, then to the bishop of Verona, and finally to a Venetian patrician.

A case in point is given by the ancient hospice of San Giuliano. Remaining outside the city walls built by the Scaligeris in 1365, it ceased to function around the middle of the 15th century. The church, however, continued to be officiated and indeed in the same period had furnishings and restorations. It became the property of the city municipality after the withdrawal of the Benedictines, and was united with the church of St. Vincent and assigned the cure of souls of the surrounding territory. It became a traditional meeting place between the townspeople and the bishops – almost all Venetians in the 15th century – on the day they entered the Vicenza diocese.

=== New women's monasteries ===
The new lifestyles of the modern age under the rule of the Venetian Republic also changed the relationship of proximity between the monasteries and the city. Inhabited largely by daughters of noble families, women's monasteries occupied spaces within the walls.

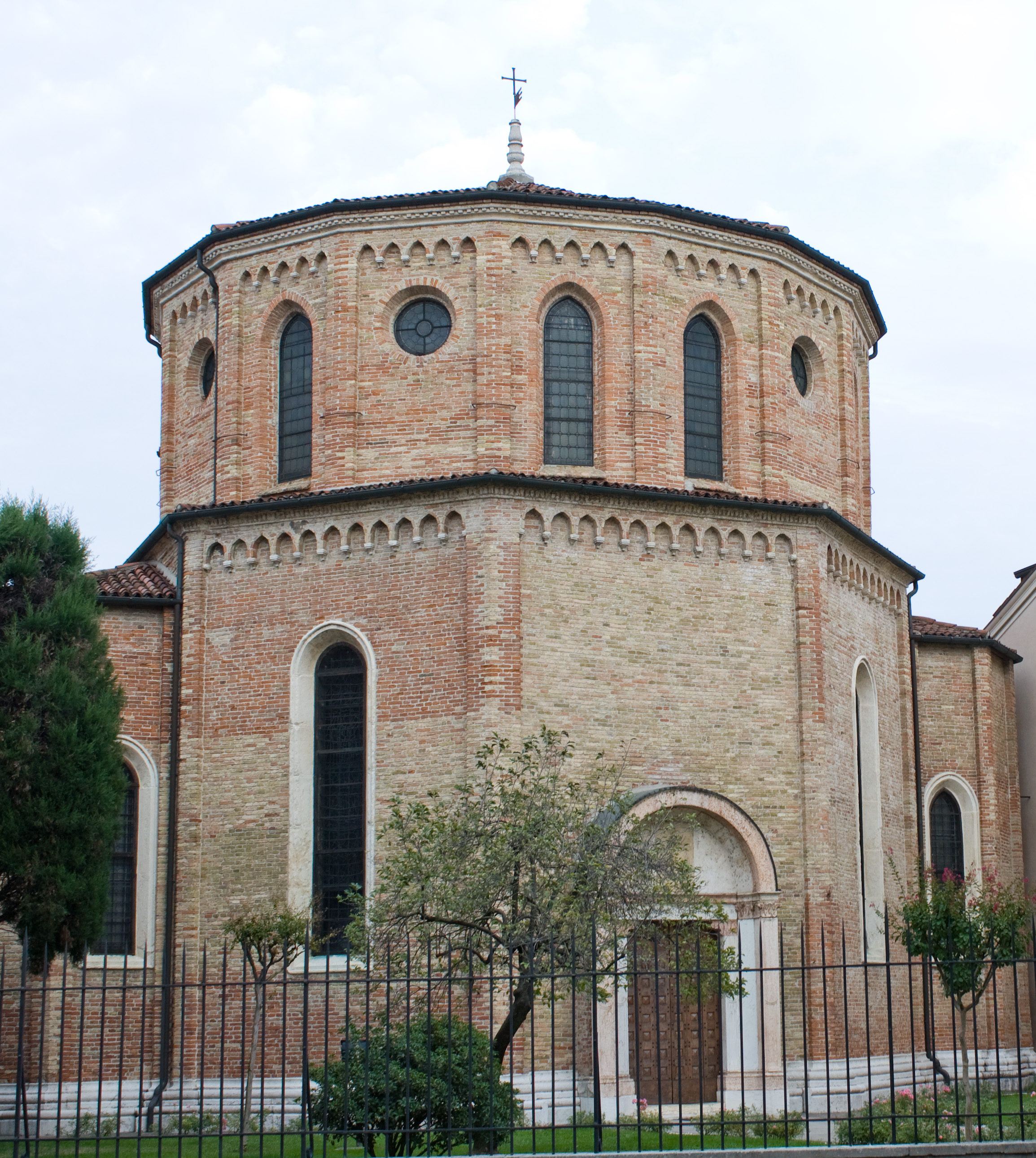
Vicenza – Exterior of the church of Saints Bernardine and Clare

The entry of the Observant Franciscans into Vicenza had also sparked enthusiasm among women, and the establishment of new monasteries was favored by the municipal authorities. Thus a community of Poor Clares in 1436 settled in that part of the monastery of St. Thomas that, a few years earlier, had been vacated by the canons of St. Mark who had moved to St. Bartholomew. Soon afterwards the Poor Clares, strongly supported by private donations, began the construction of their monastery, though they continued to use the church of St. Thomas together with the Augustinian nuns with whom, moreover, they were often at odds. In 1451 John of Capistrano came to Vicenza and, in a sermon delivered at San Lorenzo, urged the people of Vicenza to build a new church to be dedicated to St. Bernardino of Siena, who had been canonized in Rome the previous year and also celebrated in Vicenza where he had preached. Twelve days later a solemn procession of city authorities accompanied Bishop Francesco Malipiero to lay the foundation stone of the church, which was completed in 1476; by 1483 all the altars were built, and in 1494 the one dedicated to St. Clare was consecrated.

It was such a success that within a few years the monastery of St. Bernardino became inadequate, and so, around 1500, a new church and monastery dedicated to St. Francis of Assisi in Borgo Pusterla were built on the site of an older chapel in Borgo Pusterla, into which a part of the Poor Clares converged. The initiative for the construction was taken by five Vicenza nobles, who had purchased the land in 1497. The expense of construction did not prove to be a problem and the monastery was soon built, so that in 1503 six nuns, all from noble families of the city, entered it; this first nucleus soon grew and at some times the number of nuns reached up to 70, in addition to the number of choristers and lay sisters.

Around 1540 two other monasteries – that of Santa Maria Nova and Corpus Domini – were created a short distance apart in Borgo Porta Nova by nuns of the Augustinian rule, who had come out of the monastery of St. Anthony of Schio. Especially the first of the two was inhabited predominantly by women from aristocratic families, and the distinctly aristocratic character helped distinguish this religious community from the others also by the sumptuousness of the buildings and furnishings. As for the buildings, both churches and convent premises were constructed in a relatively short time, well supported by funding from the families to which they belonged. The first monastery was thus able to afford, for example, the monumental church of Santa Maria Nova, designed by Andrea Palladio.

In 1523 Domicilla Thiene and Febronia Trissino, nuns of the Benedictine community of San Pietro in Vicenza – perhaps inspired by St. Cajetan – in search of a more withdrawn place asked to be allowed to settle, together with other companions, in the monastery of San Silvestro. The latter thus came back to life, animated by the faith and zeal of the nuns, so high that – it is recorded in the chronicles – the bishop had to intervene to temper the excessively strict rules that Domicilla, the abbess, had imposed. In 1551 there were as many as 25 nuns in the monastery, the most prosperous in the city, and until the mid-18th century they always exceeded 30. The church, which had six altars, was remodeled in 1568 and the following years; in the following century the apses were demolished for the erection of the nuns' choir and the interior was enriched with a coffered ceiling decorated with seven canvases, including five by Carpioni.

=== New churches and men's convents ===
As for the men's religious orders, the era of monasteries was over and, as early as the 13th century, the era of convents, which were well established in the city, had begun.

Around 1430 the Jesuati arrived in Vicenza, who in Borgo Pusterla built both the church, which was consecrated in 1491, and the convent in a few decades. The Jesuati lived very poorly, providing a stable witness of Christian life that lasted until the Council of Trent.

The Observants bought the land in Pra' dell'Asinello near Porta Pusterla and, aided by many donations from private benefactors, provided for the construction of the monastery and the church of San Biagio Nuovo between 1530 and 1545; in the second half of the century the church was enriched with altars and chapels.

== From the second half of the 16th to the entire 18th century ==
=== Structural and artistic features ===
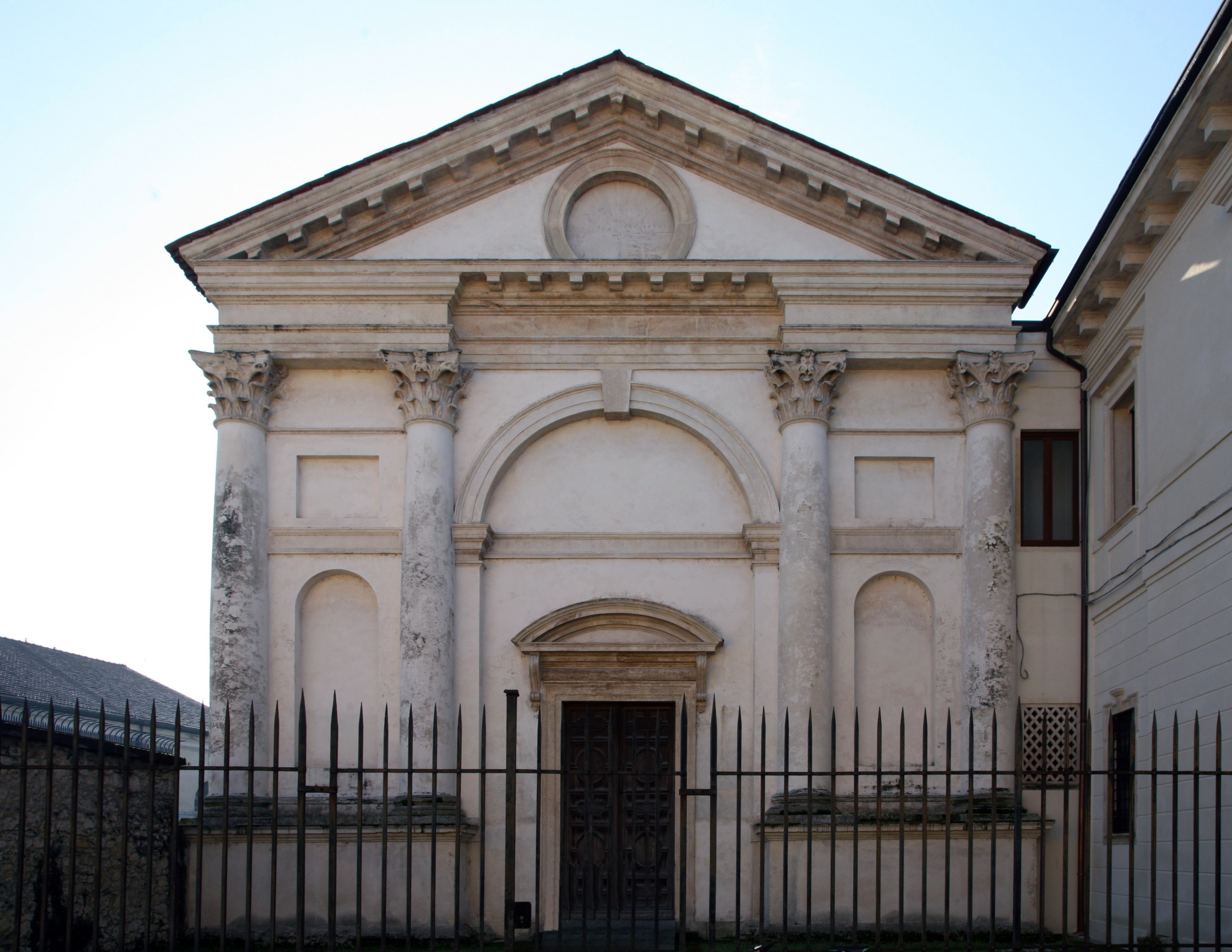
Façade of the church of Santa Maria Nova, the only religious building entirely designed by Palladio in Vicenza.

Beginning in the second half of the sixteenth century, religious architecture in Vicenza changed decisively. Andrea Palladio's artistic approach, which saw the city as a grand stage setting, dovetailed well with the theological motivations of the ecclesiastical reform sought by the Council of Trent.

The church building became the symbol of God's power, taking on a monumental character, unlike the bare and symbolless Protestant churches of northern Europe. The construction of new religious buildings and the rebuilding of previously existing ones took place using the classical schemes proposed by Palladio and was entrusted to architects who were inspired by him. Churches and convents were almost indistinguishable from stately palaces: in both columns and tympana, large portals and windows, painted ceilings, statues, inlays and colored marble. Only the subjects depicted in statues and paintings inspired by religious tradition or classical mythology changed; but there was no lack, even in churches, of warrior symbols and coats of arms of the families that had financed their construction.

Particular emphasis was placed on light, intended to reflect heaven.

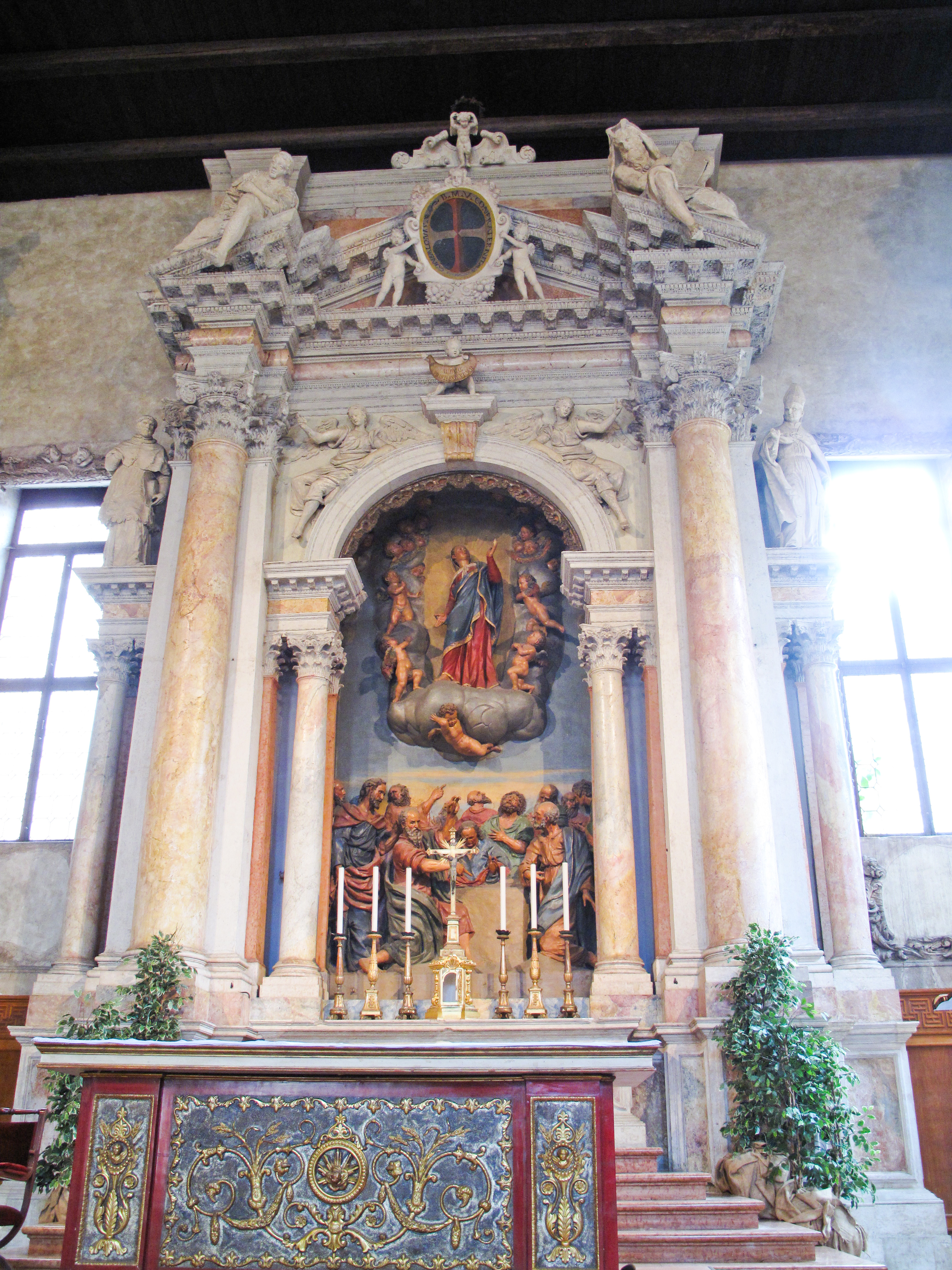
Altar and altarpiece of the Assumption of Mary in the Oratory of the Gonfalone

The high altar was placed at half height above a flight of steps in the central chapel; the celebrant – in complete contrast to Protestant theology, where the pastor is only a member of the congregation – facing the altar, was away from the people, although the choir stalls of the canons or friars – which had previously been placed in the middle of the nave, were moved to the side or behind the high altar.

There was a multiplication in the number of chapels and side altars, on which the priests, who supported themselves with these benefices, could daily officiate, also to satisfy the numerous testamentary bequests for the celebration of masses for the suffrage of the dead.

Frequent were the depictions of symbols of heaven – angels and cherubs, saints in ecstasy, chiaroscuro effects – and of the Church, St. Peter's keys and triregnum, cardinal and episcopal coats of arms. These were symbols not found (forbidden) in Protestant churches.

The work was supplied by workshops of stone masons (those of Pedemuro, the Albanese, and the Merlo family gained fame), architects and master masons (such as Guarini, Antonio Pizzocaro, the Borella), sculptors (the Marinali brothers), painters (such as the Maganza, Francesco Maffei, Giulio Carpioni), and the artisans (carpenters, inlayers) who produced the furnishings.

=== Counter-Reformation churches and convents ===
The construction of new churches generally corresponded with the entry of new religious orders into the city.

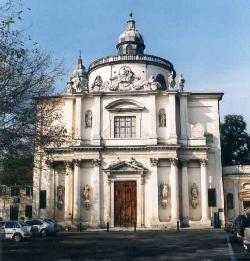
The church of Santa Maria in Araceli, attributed to Guarino Guarini

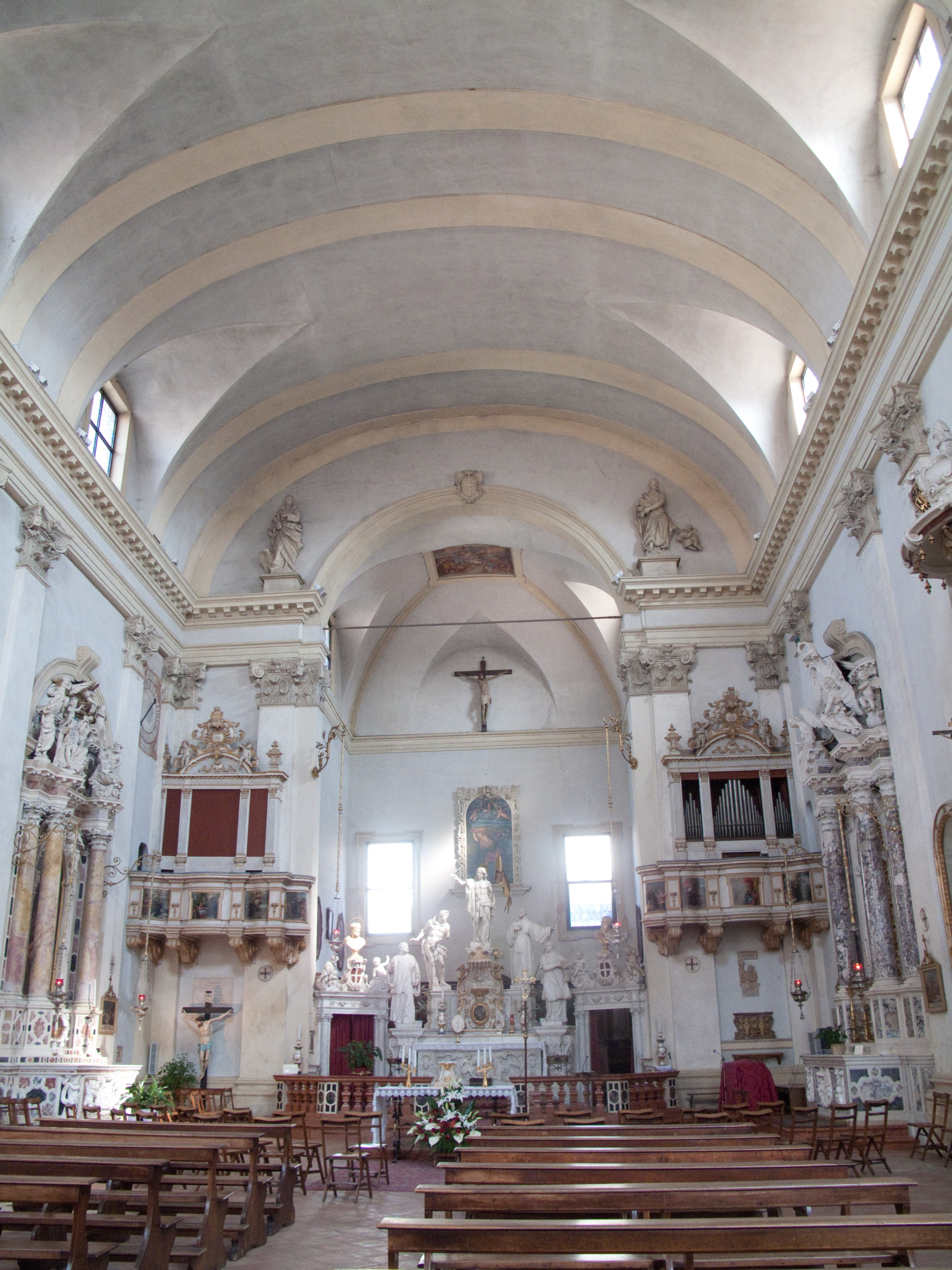
Interior of the church of San Giuliano

In 1647 the friars of the Order of Minims arrived in Vicenza, who, with the support of some of the city's noble families, obtained possession of the church of San Giuliano from the municipality, which, however, was in precarious condition and too small for their needs. With repeated pleas that lasted about a century they obtained from the City Council the concession of more and more space and the financing of construction and embellishment works. In 1666 – under the direction of architect Antonio Pizzocaro, who had drawn up the project – construction began on the convent and in 1684 on a new, larger church, which was also dedicated to St. Francis of Paola, founder of the Order and was called "one of the most conspicuous temples" in the city. Also in order to repair the damage caused by the 1695 earthquake, in 1743 the Minims asked and obtained from the municipality the right to build a new convent with its facade on the strada regia, that is, the road to Padua. The Vicentine Minims were forced to leave San Giuliano in 1784, based on a decree of the Republic of Venice that abolished religious communities that were too small. A few years later – driven out in turn by Napoleonic decrees from the convent of San Biagio in Pedemuro – the Capuchins moved into the monastery and church.

The church of San Girolamo, officiated by the Jesuati, was for centuries under the patronage of the Arnaldi family, which with substantial donations had the central chapel and some side altars built. But the Jesuati order was dissolved by Pope Clement IX in 1668 in order to recover its property, sell it to other religious and allocate the proceeds to the expenses of the war against the Turks. In their place settled the Discalced Carmelites who, in the first half of the 18th century, began the construction of the present church of San Marco in San Girolamo; to the new church, the dedication to St. Jerome was retained, and that of St. Teresa of Ávila, the Carmelite's saint of reference, was added.

In 1595 the Theatines, the order founded by the Vicenza-born St. Cajetan, entered the city and took over the management of St. Stephen's parish and around 1667-1668 built their convent. Two years later St. Gaetano was canonized and this attracted considerable contributions and donations from both the municipality and private individuals. However, when, in the last years of the century, they undertook the complete reconstruction of the church of Santo Stefano and yet were denied the change of the dedication in favor of their patron saint, they abandoned the parish and in just nine years – supported by strong private funding (the Municipality was opposed to this, however) – built the new church of San Gaetano Thiene, with its facade on the main city street.

The reconstruction of Santo Stefano – in Vicenza the only church with a distinctly Roman style, begun by the Vicenza architect Carlo Borella – who at that time enjoyed great fame for having built the church of Araceli and the sanctuary of Monte Berico – went on for more than 40 years, supported by disbursements from the Municipality and donations from private citizens, and ended in 1764 with the construction of the high altar.

The Somaschi Fathers, settled in the parish of Saints Philip and James and in charge of the education of youth and diocesan clergy, particularly in the new seminary, during the second half of the seventeenth century engaged in the rebuilding of the church and the construction of an imposing convent (current home of the Bertoliana Civic Library).

=== Renewal fervor ===
In the wake of the religious renewal of the Counter-Reformation, many other pre-existing buildings, churches and monasteries were also rebuilt or renovated. The modes of initiative and financing were the usual ones – conspicuous private donations and bequests as well as public funding – further testifying to the unique social and power system in which very close relations between civil authority, religious authority and the city's aristocratic families were intertwined. Until the entire seventeenth century, architects, contractors and master builders, and artisan workshops of painters and sculptors were also more or less the same and from Vicenza.

Some important constructions involved municipally owned churches.

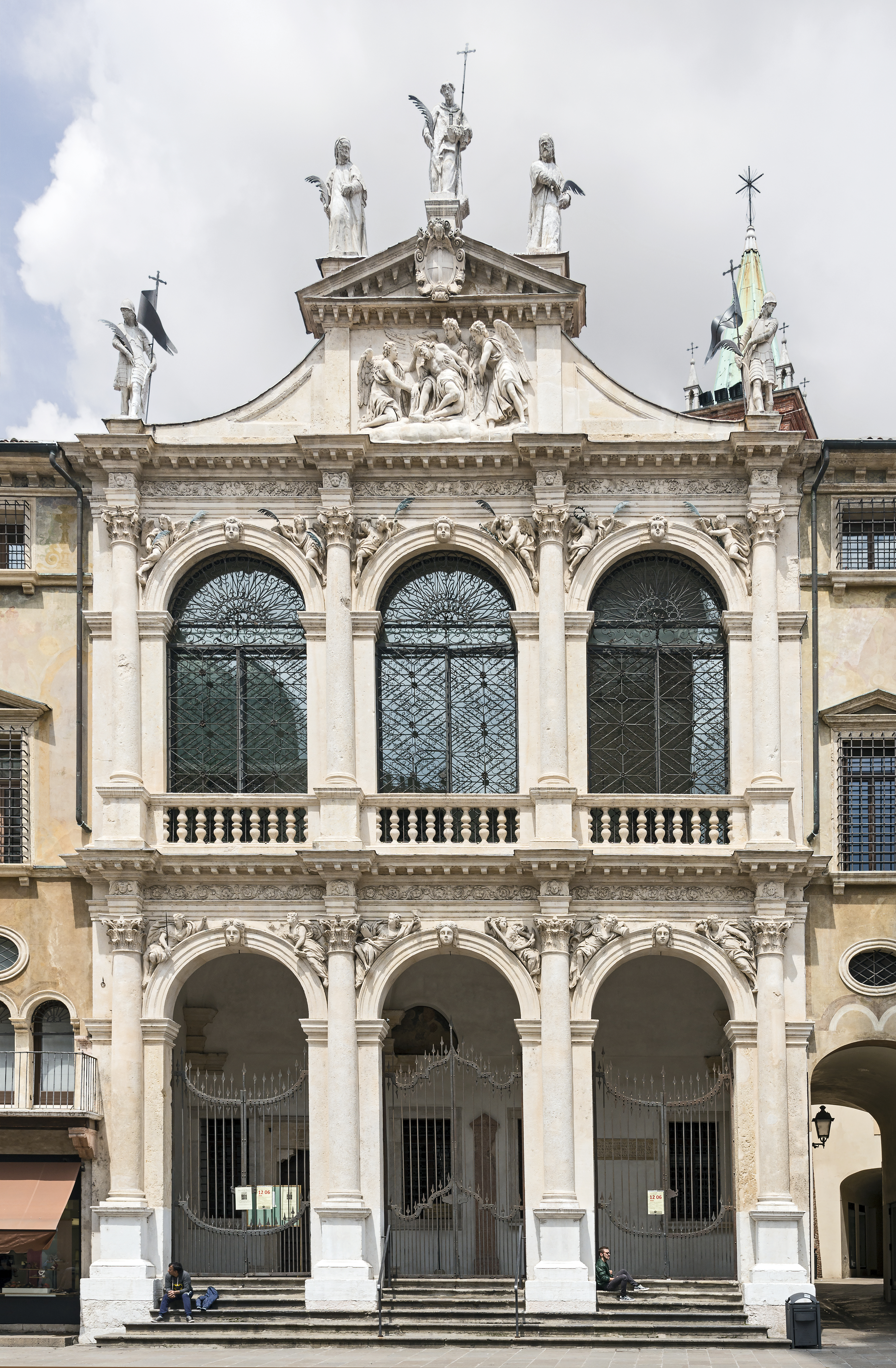
Facade of the church of San Vincenzo

In the early seventeenth century, once the work on the city's mount of piety had been completed, the Baroque-style construction of the facade and a monumental new entrance to the church of San Vincenzo, set into the palace, was commissioned as a sign of the centrality of Vicentine worship. A century later the extension of the interior of the church, with the erection of the new presbytery, was built by the same architect who had built the prestigious facade of the palace on Contrà del Monte, Francesco Muttoni.

When the plague of 1630 ceased, the mayors of the municipality in agreement with the Servites decided to enlarge the fifteenth-century church on Monte Berico; the architect Carlo Borella – realizing a design by Andrea Palladio from 1562, but departing from it in part – built the new basilica in the Baroque style.

Of the church and convent of San Giuliano, also owned by the municipality and entrusted to the Minim Friars, it has been mentioned above.

Other buildings were instead renovated on private initiative.

In Borgo Berga, mainly due to the impetus given by the patronage of the Valmarana family and the jurisconsult Giovanni Maria Bertolo, the new church of the Benedictine monastery of Santa Caterina and the oratory of the Zitelle, both attributed to Antonio Pizzocaro, were built at the end of the 17th century. Almost simultaneously, the Baroque facade of the church of Santa Caterina in Porto, attributed to Muttoni, was replaced with a larger one.

The old church of Araceli, which had been renovated several times over time, was demolished in 1675 and rebuilt in Baroque forms to a design by architect Guarino Guarini and work by Carlo Borella.

The Filippini church was erected beginning in 1730, the work of two architects: the Venetian Giorgio Massari, who designed the apse and the plan, and the Vicentine Antonio Piovene, who designed the nave and the facade, the latter built on an interpretation of Ottone Calderari's design for the Scalzi church.

Even in the cathedral, whose present appearance dates from the mid-15th century, work and remodeling continued in the following centuries: the construction of the present apse – begun in 1482 by Lorenzo da Bologna – was completed in 1540, when it appeared that the Council then held in Trent was to be celebrated there, and to the second half of the century date Palladio's works, the northern portal, tambour and dome.

=== Oratories and chapels of the Confraternities ===
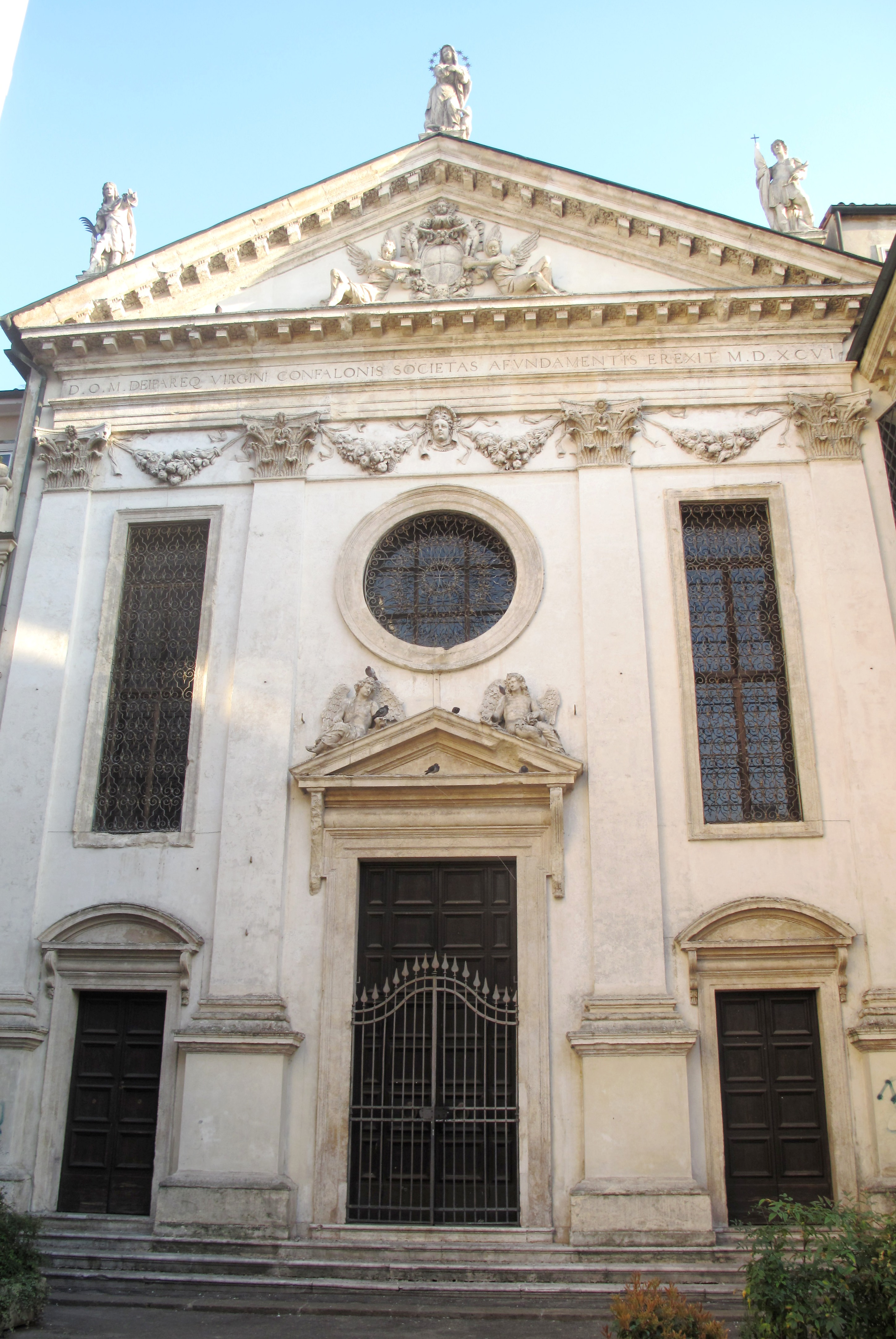
Façade of the Oratory of the Gonfalone in Piazza Duomo

Bearers of a religiosity that stemmed from popular faith and, at the same time, from the interests of the city's noble families, the confraternities created religious spaces – the oratories – true private churches in which mass was celebrated and the members of the sodality received the sacraments, attended services, and organized themselves in devotional practices and works of charity.

At the church of Santa Corona, where both had their own chapel, both the Confraternity of Mercy, also known as the Turchini, and the Confraternity of the Rosary, which was particularly popular after the Battle of Lepanto, built their own oratories.

The respective confraternities built the Oratory of the Gonfalone in Piazza Duomo, the Oratory of the Crucifix behind the church of Santa Maria dei Servi, and the Oratory of St. Nicholas of Tolentino attached to the church of San Michele.

== Contemporary age ==
The transition from the 18th to the 19th century represented a moment of radical change for ecclesiastical organization, as well as for places of worship and religious life in the city and the territory.

The change had begun as early as 1771, when the Republic of Venice issued decrees abolishing monasteries and convents in which there was not a minimum number of religious and forfeiting the property to the public domain. This was, for example, the fate of the monastery of St. Bartholomew, the richest in the city after that of San Felice, which was turned into a city hospital. The few remaining Camaldolese monks there were also removed from the convent of Santa Lucia, as were the Minim friars from San Giuliano in 1984.

However, a radical change occurred under the French Empire when, at two successive times, in 1806 and 1810, all male and female monasteries and convents were eliminated by law and the number of parishes was reduced. For the church community, this meant the loss of the considerable real estate accumulated over the centuries, which became state property and was almost always left in a state of neglect: convent buildings were reused as barracks or warehouses, many churches were deconsecrated and demolished, and the artistic heritage was dispersed.

The advent, a few years later, of the Catholic Habsburg Empire did not restore the previous situation: not only had the real estate and artistic heritage disappeared, but also the benefices attached to altars, chapels and churches that formed the necessary basis for their maintenance. Above all, the city's aristocratic class that in previous centuries – occupying all the important positions in the public administration, in the ecclesiastical hierarchy and even within convents and monasteries – had created and increased this patrimony, through public and private funding, had radically changed, if not disappeared.

Religious buildings no longer had the symbolic function of the past, when they had served to celebrate not only saints but also condottieri and military victories, the splendors of the Venetian Republic and the papacy, the cultural identity of a mainland capital. The Enlightenment of the previous century, the new economy of the territory, the different political situation by now imposed new identity symbols.

For the Church, it was not only a disadvantage: deprived of most of the material goods and constraints from which not even popes and local bishops had been able to free it, it was freer to rebuild its organization around diocesan parishes and to promote the more spiritual, cultural and theological aspects of its mission.

All this until after World War II.

=== Structural and artistic features ===
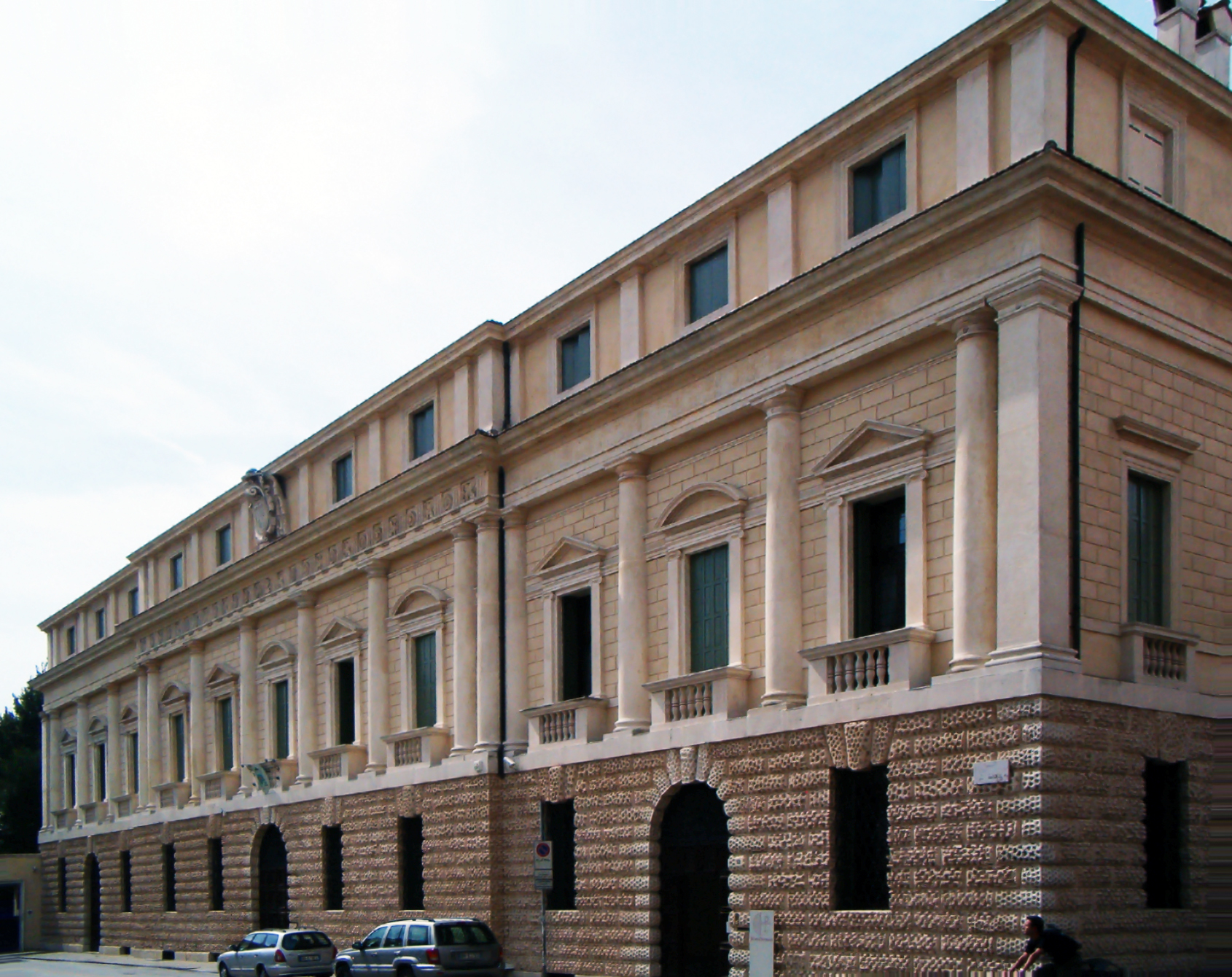
The bishop's palace as seen from Cathedral Square

Very little can be said about the characteristics of religious architecture from the early 19th to the mid-20th century because, given the situation, almost nothing was built from scratch.

Exceptions are the bishop's palace, the seminary and the major cemetery, but these are more like civil buildings, to the construction of which the canons of the time were applied. They were taken care of by Bartolomeo Malacarne and Giacomo Verda, the architects and town planners who were the authors of many normalization interventions in the city, and the Venetian Francesco Lazzari: all designed according to a strict Palladian neoclassical style, with criteria of maximum rationality and functionality.

In the second half of the nineteenth century, when work had to be done on the restoration of some important churches in Vicenza, the renovations of the fifteenth-century Gothic were in the neo-Gothic style; traces of this can be seen on the exteriors of the cathedral, Santa Corona, and the first church of the sanctuary of Monte Berico.

=== Napoleonic reform of ecclesiastical organization ===
Vicenza's complex ecclesiastical system, in its composition of diocese, parishes, monasteries and convents, religious orders and lay confraternities, heritages, privileges and benefices of the clergy, was profoundly modified in the early nineteenth century by Napoleonic legislation, which was preserved even under the Habsburg Empire.

In the city of Vicenza, the parish network was completely downsized, with the aim of eliminating superfluous centers of worship. The parishes were reduced from 15 to 10: only the parishes of the Cathedral, Santo Stefano and San Marcello (later transported from the church of San Marcello to the neighboring church of the Filippini) remained in the historic center in the strict sense, to which was added the parish of Santa Maria dei Servi, to which the previous one of San Michele was transferred. The city's other parishes were those of Santa Caterina in place of San Silvestro for all of Borgo Berga, Santa Maria in Araceli in place of the church of Santa Lucia for Borgo Santa Lucia, San Pietro, Santi Felice e Fortunato, Santa Croce in San Giacomo for Borgo Porta Nova, and San Marco in San Girolamo for Borgo Pusterla. The territories of the parishes also extended to the hamlets.

Between 1807 and 1810 all men's convents were suppressed: of the 13 existing in the city in 1797, after the 1806 decree those of the Dominicans in Santa Corona, the Carmelites in San Girolamo degli Scalzi, the Capuchins in San Giuliano, the Reformed Fathers in San Giuseppe dei Riformati, the Oratorians in San Filippo Neri, and the Servants of Mary in Monte Berico remained at least partially alive. All were later suppressed by the Napoleonic law of April 25, 1810.

The same happened to the women's monasteries: of the 14 that existed in the city at the advent of the democratic government in 1797, with the execution of the viceregal decree of July 28, 1806, the monasteries of the Humiliate of Ognissanti, the Augustinian nuns of Corpus Domini and Santa Maria Maddalena in Borgo Pusterla (Convertite), the Poor Clares of Santa Chiara and Santa Maria in Araceli, the Capuchin nuns, the Dimesse di Santa Maria Nova, the Benedictine nuns of San Pietro and the Dominican nuns of San Domenico were left alive. All surviving monasteries were then suppressed by the above-mentioned Napoleonic law of 1810.

All confraternities, with the exception of that of the Blessed Sacrament, with their chapels or churches were also suppressed.

The religious – deprived of their sources of income, because the Napoleonic legislation had forfeited to the state property the legacies of worship, that is, bequests for the celebration of religious services – either dispersed or went to enlarge the ranks of the parish clergy: the city had an average of one priest for every 150 inhabitants.

This downsizing led to the spoliation and reconversion of some churches, including historic ones such as that of Saints Faustino and Giovita and that of Saints Philip and James, and the demolition of others, such as almost all of the city's ancient chapels: St. Marcellus, St. Paul's, St. Eleutherius (St. Barbara), and St. Michael's.

=== Resumption of the settlement of religious orders ===
The period of French occupation having ended, under Austria some religious orders resumed living in the city, almost always to carry out pastoral and social activities.

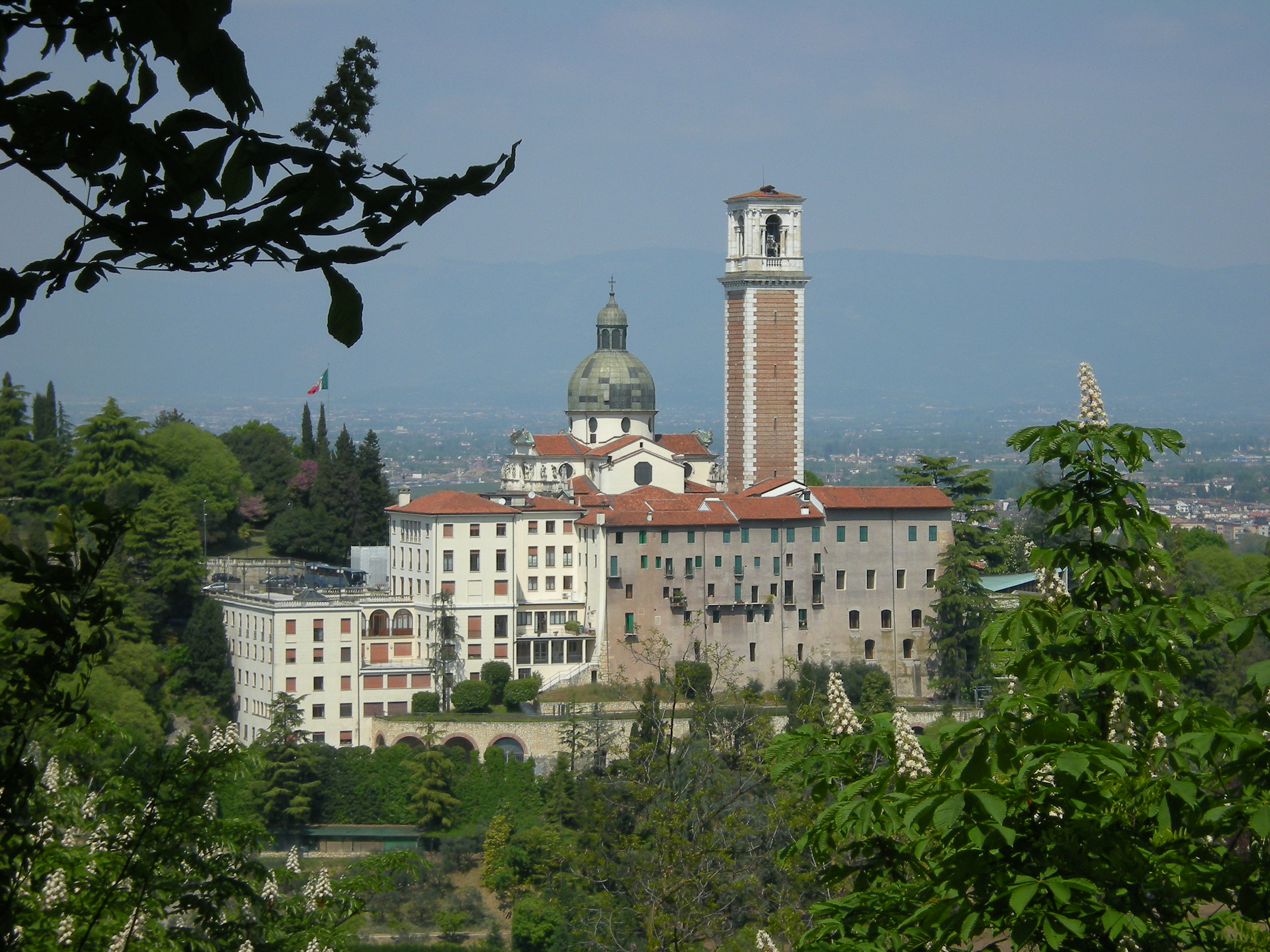
The Monte Berico shrine complex as seen from the south, with works from the 19th and 20th centuries

The Sanctuary of Monte Berico and the Servants of Mary who officiated at it enjoyed considerable prestige in the city, so the resumption of religious life at the shrine was swift and led to the imperial decree of 1835, which reconstituted the convent.

But even before that, building activity had continued: the construction of the three new side steps, by Giacomo Verda, was in 1817; the 8 Si2 bells, rung in the Vicentine style, were in 1821; the replacement of the 15th-century bell tower with a more grandiose one, designed by the Vicentine architect Antonio Piovene, was begun in 1826; and in 1860 the facade of the 15th-century church, on the west side, was restored by the architect Giovanni Miglioranza, who redid it in the neo-Gothic style. Also in the twentieth century there were other additions. Next to the bell tower the modern Penitentiary was built between 1971 and 1972.

In 1830 the abandoned church of Santa Lucia was entrusted to the Reformed Friars Minor, who restored and expanded the convent. This did not last long, because the new Kingdom of Italy also enacted laws to suppress religious bodies, and the convent part was used as a shelter, leaving the friars with only the church, which in 1895 was purchased by the Priests' Charitable Congregation.

In 1837, at the behest of Emperor Francis I of Austria, who appreciated their work, the English Dames took possession of the conventual part that had formerly belonged to the Carmelites, adjoining the church of San Marco in Borgo Pusterla, where they built an oratory and where they managed and still manage educational activities.

The Sisters Teachers of St. Dorothy, an order established in 1836 by Giovanni Antonio Farina, later bishop of Vicenza, had the mother church of their institute, named after the Sacred Hearts, built around 1940, the church of Perpetual Adoration in 1913, and around 1950 the chapel of St. Maria Bertilla.

The Franciscan church and convent of San Lorenzo had a more troubled history. Plundered and used first as a military hospital, then for the quartering of Napoleonic troops, they remained in a state of neglect until the municipality bought them in 1836 to carry out their restoration. Monuments and tombs from other city churches were transported to the church and it was reopened for worship in 1839 but, over time, it was closed again in 1859 and in 1866, during the wars of independence, used for war necessities. Despite continuous restoration work, in 1903 the church was declared unsafe due to structural damage and again closed for radical intervention. Reopened in 1914, after nearly ten years of work, it was closed again a year later, following the outbreak of World War I, once again to be used as a food supply warehouse. Re-opened for good to worship in 1927, it was given back to the Conventual Franciscans who still officiate there today.

In 1880 the Members of the Congregation of St. Joseph of Murialdo came to Vicenza, where they established the Leo XIII Patronage and built a church dedicated to the Sacred Heart of Jesus within it.

=== Other religious buildings of the 19th and early 20th centuries ===
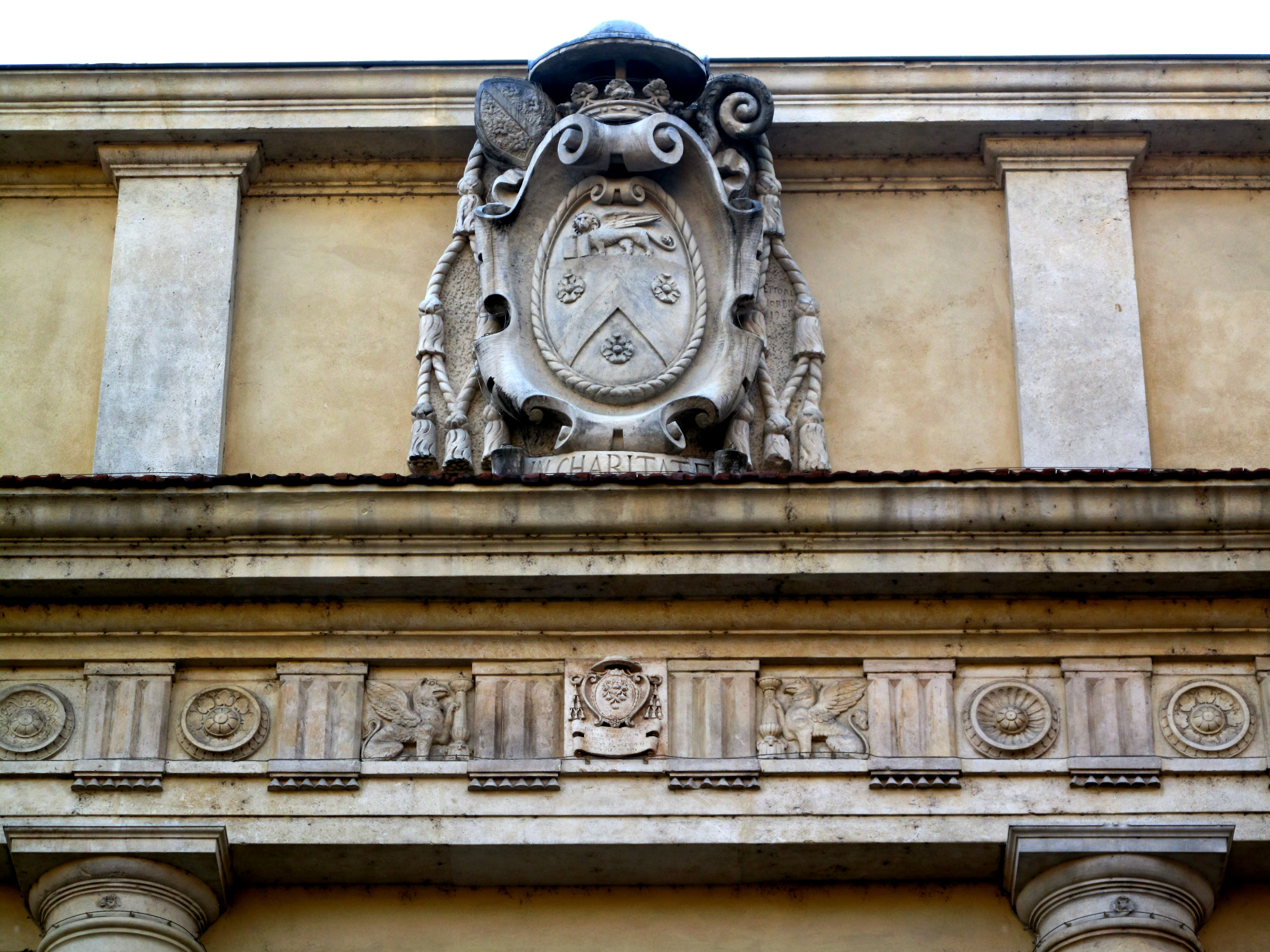
Façade of the Bishop's Palace: detail with the coat of arms of Bishop Carlo Zinato.

From 1810 to 1818, throughout the period of transition from the Kingdom of Italy to the Kingdom of Lombardy-Venetia, the bishop's see remained vacant, but there was still a desire to renovate the bishop's palace. The southern wing was replaced in 1812-14 with a building designed by Bartolomeo Malacarne, but this was not to the taste of the people and was soon torn down. The central building by Ottavio Bruto Revese was then replaced with a palace designed by Luganese architect Giacomo Verda.

This part of the palace was destroyed by repeated Anglo-American air raids during World War II, and was rebuilt from 1947 to 1952, with the addition of the attic, in the center of which stands the large coat of arms of Bishop Carlo Zinato.

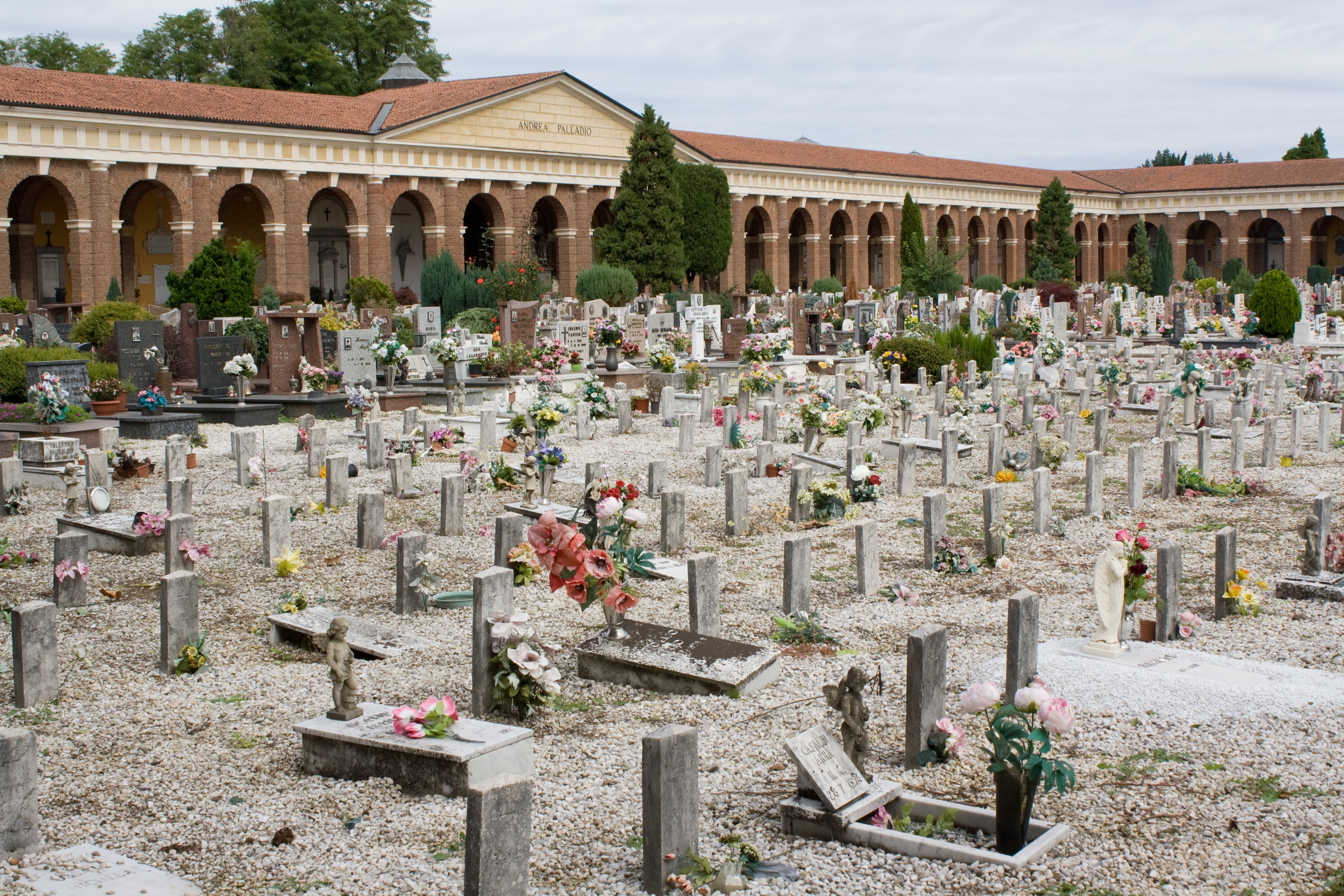
The Monumental Cemetery – North Portico and Infants' Sector.

Another complex, which at that time could be classified among the buildings of a religious and specifically Catholic character, was the Major Cemetery, commissioned by the municipality to Bartolomeo Malacarne, who arranged it in 1815-16; located along a still depopulated stretch of the Via Postumia, it was completed in 1848.

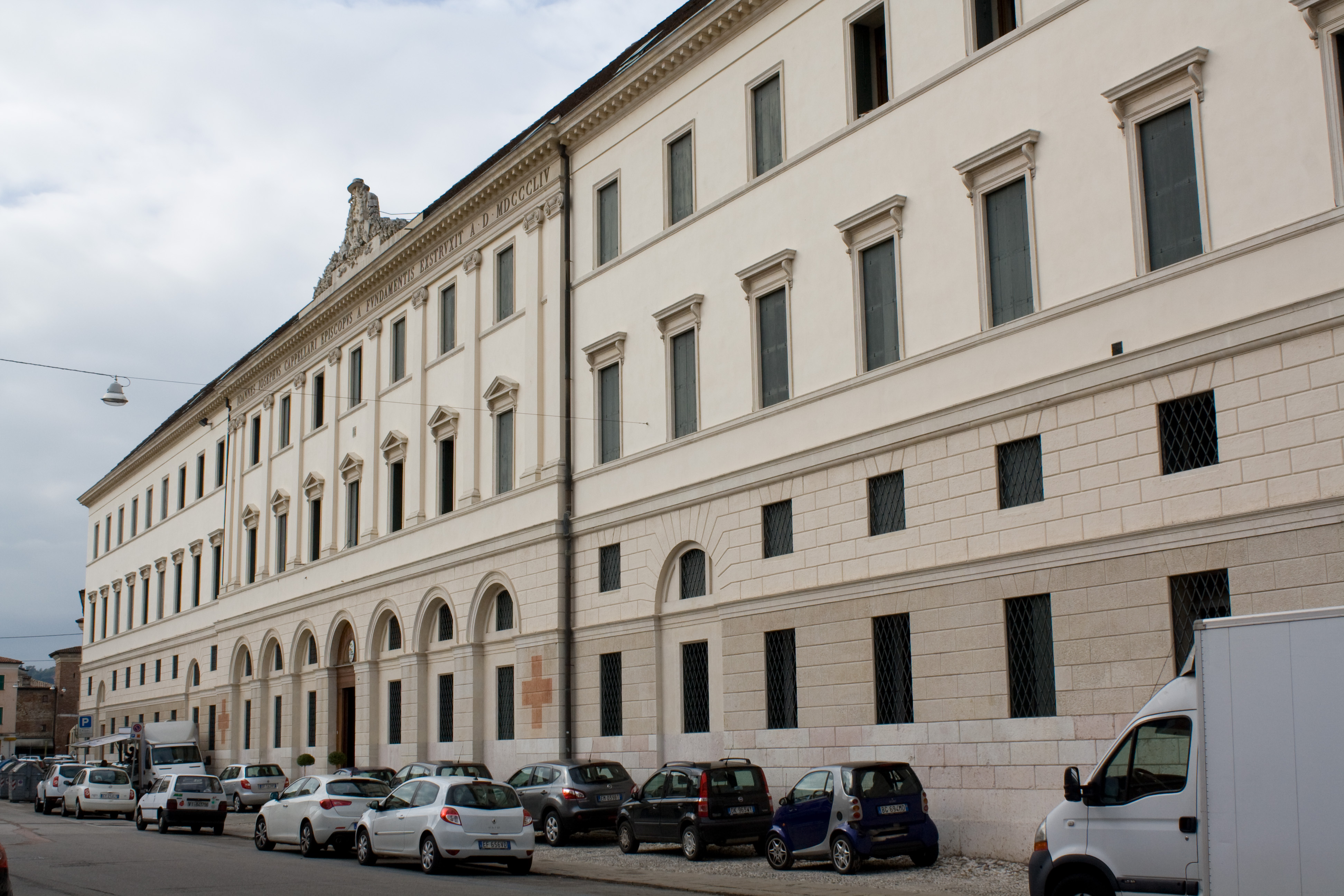
The Episcopal Seminary, built in the first half of the 19th century.

From 1842 to 1854, designed by Venetian architect Francesco Lazzari and at the behest of Bishop Giovanni Giuseppe Cappellari, the Episcopal Seminary was built opposite the church of Santa Lucia. However, the building was not immediately used for the function for which it was erected and was used several times for civilian purposes: in 1849 because of the cholera that struck the city, then until 1863 as barracks by Austrian troops, and finally throughout the duration of World War I as a military hospital. On a still uncovered area adjoining the Episcopal Seminary, the Minor Seminary was built by the diocese in 1958.

The only new public church of this period, built to provide a home for a new parish, was that of Our Lady of Peace; built beginning in 1914 where an older oratory had existed, it was dedicated in a vow made to Our Lady of Mount Berico by Bishop Rodolfi to ward off enemy invasion during World War I.

=== Churches after World War II ===
Already in the first half of the century the city had opened up, tearing down what remained of the old city walls and gates, filling in the moats, and creating new neighborhoods and new ring roads; however, this had not changed the ecclesiastical organization and the parish system.

From the 1950s onward, on the other hand, under the effect of the population boom and internal immigration, the city expanded powerfully with the creation of entire new urban villages; this development was also matched by the diocese with the establishment of new parishes, in order to place churches at the center of the new settlements, according to the new pastoral vision proposed by the Second Vatican Council. The same happened with the settlements that were consolidated even before the last war, where the parish had not yet been established (for example, the neighborhoods of San Bortolo and Ferrovieri).

The most commonly used practice was to buy land central to the new settlement, build a small temporary church – which would later become a youth center – and entrust it to a coadjutor priest of the mother parish. Once the village had grown, the new parish would be established and construction of the permanent church would begin.

Compared to other Italian settlements, where the function of the church was considered residual and a marginal plot of land was assigned to it, in Vicenza churches were generally given a central role and location in the new village that was developing. Often the project was entrusted to a local architect, who was involved in the urban organization, and thus buildings were avoided – as happened in other places – based on new theological conceptions but alien to religious sentiment.

This was the case, for example, with the churches built in the settlements that arose between the first and second ring-roads: those of the Immaculate Heart of Mary and St. Paul in the neighborhoods of St. Bortolo and St. Paul respectively, of Christ the King or Araceli Nuova in the Araceli neighborhood, of St. Andrew in the neighborhood of the same name, of St. Anthony in the Ferrovieri, of the Holy Family in St. Lazarus, of St. Joseph the Worker in St. Joseph, and of St. Bertilla in the Cattane.

The same was true of the villages that sprang up beyond the second ring road: the parish churches of St. Charles at the Villaggio del Sole, St. John the Baptist at Laghetto, Our Lady of Help at Saviabona, St. Francis at St. Francis, and St. Pius X in the neighborhood of the same name.

=== Conciliar architecture ===
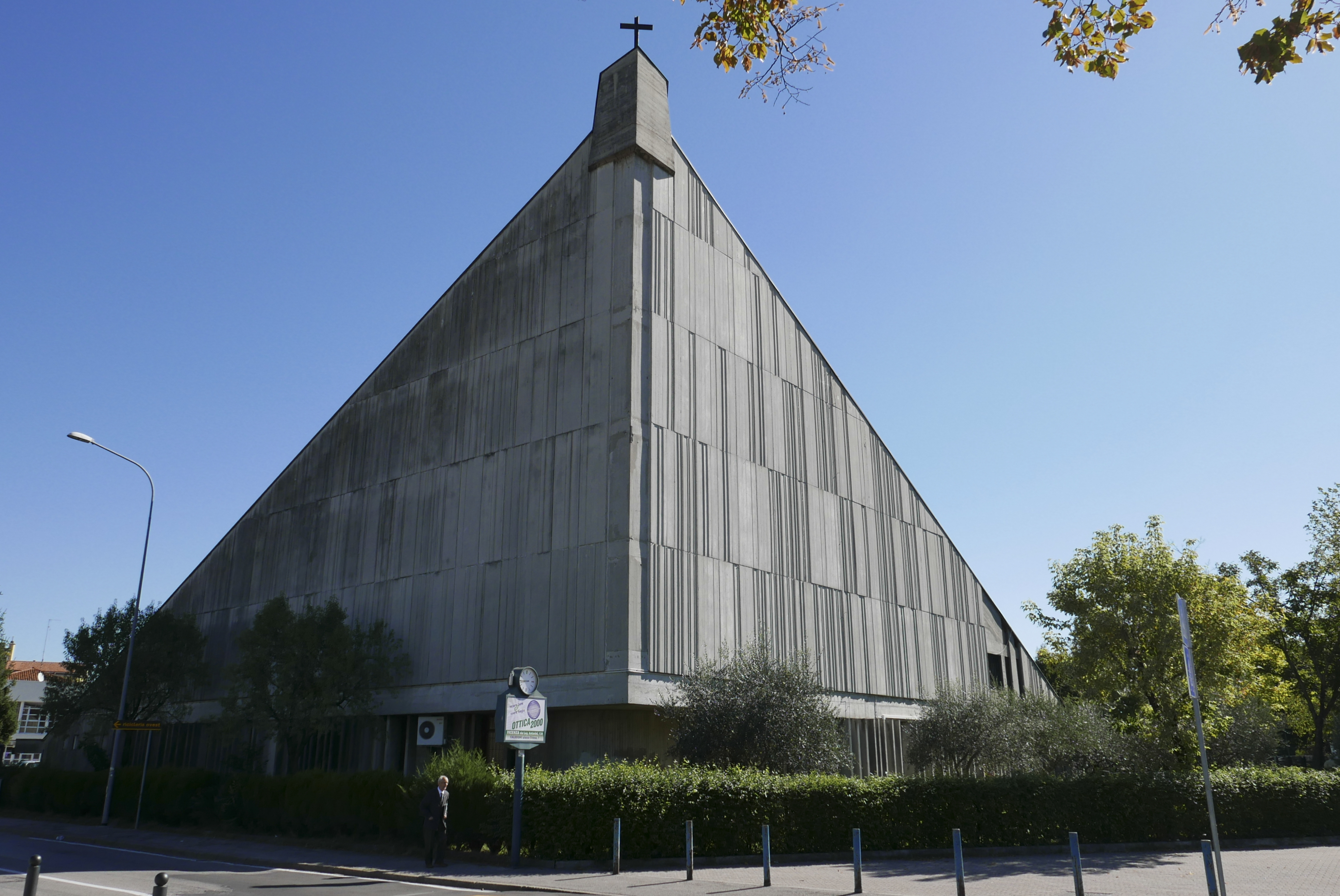
Church of St. Joseph the Worker, at the Mercato Nuovo

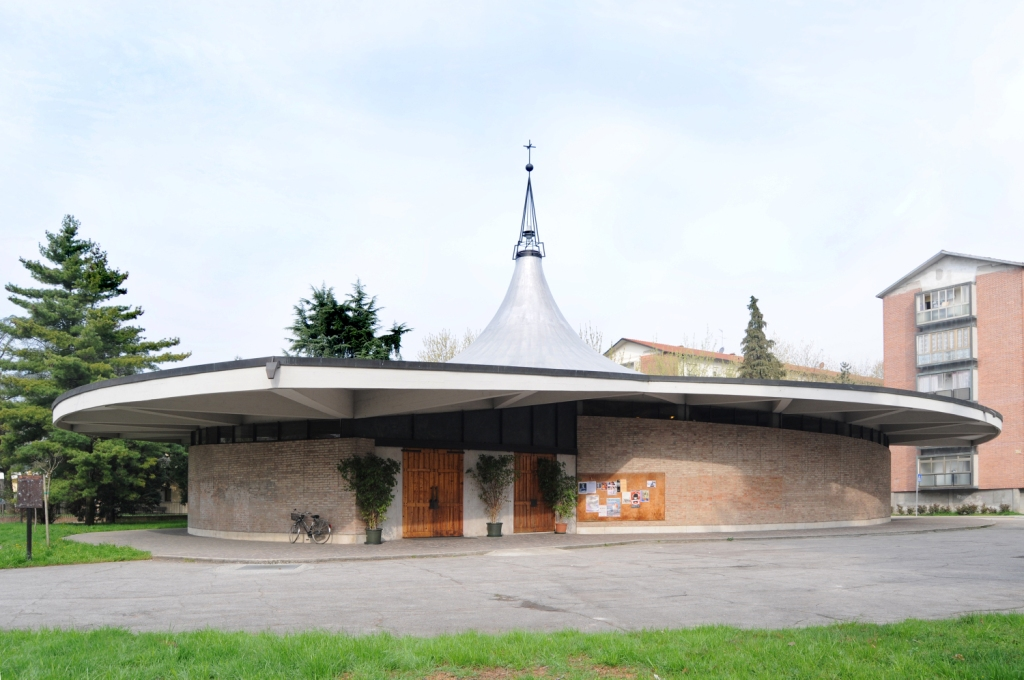
Church of St. Charles in Villaggio del Sole

In the 1960s the Council introduced reforms in pastoral care and liturgy, which caused cultic architecture to be adjusted.

The structure of the building was no longer the traditional one with a gabled roof, the great house of God overlooking the houses of men, with the interior in the shape of a Latin cross built on an axis from the entrance to the altar and ending with the chancel, where a balustrade separates the officiant from the people. The apse and chancel, also an expression of a religious class separate from the laity, no longer found a place in the new church, nor chapels or side altars, which recalled the fragmentation of the Eucharist among so many benefactors and beneficiaries. The new church took on a different symbology: still tending to be taller than the surrounding houses, it took the form of a tent, a ship, a sail, a hut, all symbols of the "people on the way."

The church was no longer seen as the place where God dwells, but as the place of gathering. Inside, the space tends to widen and become semicircular; it is the space of a community, of the people of God around the Eucharistic table where the sacrifice is celebrated, with no longer the demarcation between sacred and profane, almost an envelopment by the faithful towards the altar and the ambon; the tabernacle is moved to a side wall.

The search for the divine takes place through one's neighbor; the spaces therefore are open, with no more reserved niches or chapels, columns behind which to hide; the abundance of light makes this space always public, where the intimacy offered by medieval churches is scarce.

Space, however, is essential; there are few images or devotional objects, which in other times served a didactic function; the word of God is proclaimed, no longer from the top of a pulpit, but – sometimes even by a layman or lay woman – through a modern communication apparatus.

The use of reinforced concrete or steel structures, stylized load-bearing elements, and stained glass windows that filter daylight, supplemented or replaced by skillful artificial light effects, emphasizes modernity and accentuates discontinuity with tradition, in some cases secured by embedding an ancient element, a medieval crucifix, a Baroque altar, or a classical image, in the side wall.

== See also ==
- History of religious life in Vicenza

== Bibliography ==
=== Texts used ===
- Barbieri, Franco; Cevese, Renato (2004). Vicenza, ritratto di una città [Vicenza, portrait of a city] (in Italian). Vicenza: Angelo Colla editore. ISBN 88-900990-7-0.
- Cracco, Giorgio (2009). Tra Venezia e Terraferma [Between Venice and the Mainland] (in Italian). Roma: Viella editore. ISBN 978-88-8334-396-4.
- Mantese, Giovanni (1952). Memorie storiche della Chiesa vicentina, I, Dalle origini al Mille [Historical Memoirs of the Church of Vicenza, I, From the Origins to the Year 1000.] (in Italian). Vicenza: Accademia Olimpica.
- Mantese, Giovanni (1954). Memorie storiche della Chiesa vicentina, II, Dal Mille al Milletrecento [Historical Memoirs of the Church of Vicenza, II, From the Year 1000 to the Year 1300.] (in Italian). Vicenza: Accademia Olimpica.
- Mantese, Giovanni (1958). Memorie storiche della Chiesa vicentina, III/1, Il Trecento [Historical Memoirs of the Church of Vicenza, III/1, The Fourteenth Century] (in Italian). Vicenza: Accademia Olimpica.
- Mantese, Giovanni (1964). Memorie storiche della Chiesa vicentina, III/2, Dal 1404 al 1563 [Historical Memoirs of the Church of Vicenza, III/2, From 1404 to 1563] (in Italian). Vicenza: Neri Pozza editore.
- Mantese, Giovanni (1974). Memorie storiche della Chiesa vicentina, IV, Dal 1563 al 1700 [Historical Memoirs of the Church of Vicenza, IV, From 1563 to 1700] (in Italian). Vicenza: Accademia Olimpica.
- Mantese, Giovanni (1982). Memorie storiche della Chiesa vicentina, V, Dal 1700 al 1866 [Historical Memoirs of the Church of Vicenza, V, From 1700 to 1866] (in Italian). Vicenza: Accademia Olimpica.
- Sottani, Natalino (2014). Cento chiese, una città [One hundred churches, one city] (in Italian). Vicenza: Edizioni Rezzara.

=== For more information ===
- AA.VV. (1997). Chiesa di San Pietro in Vicenza, storia fede arte [Church of San Pietro in Vicenza: history, faith and art] (in Italian). Vicenza: UTVI.
- AA.VV. (1979). La Basilica dei Santi Felice e Fortunato in Vicenza, Vol. I [The Basilica of Saints Felix and Fortunatus in Vicenza, Vol. I] (in Italian). Vicenza: Ed. Banca Popolare.
- AA.VV. (1979). La Basilica dei Santi Felice e Fortunato in Vicenza, Vol. II [The Basilica of Saints Felix and Fortunatus in Vicenza, Vol. II.] (in Italian). Vicenza: Ed. Banca Popolare.
- AA.VV. (2002). Dall'ospedale di Sant'Antonio al Palazzo delle opere sociali cattoliche. L'impegno del laicato vicentino (secoli XIV-XXI) [From St. Anthony's Hospital to the Palace of Catholic Social Works. The commitment of the Vicentine laity (14th-20th centuries).] (in Italian). Vicenza: Tipografia Rumor.
- Associazione Araldica Vicentina. I portici di Monte Berico [The porticoes of Monte Berico] (in Italian). Vicenza.
- Bandini, Ferdinando (2002). La chiesa venuta da Gerusalemme, Santa Corona [The church that came from Jerusalem, Santa Corona] (in Italian). Vicenza: Ed. Fotogramma.
- Barbieri, Giuseppe (1999). Monte Berico [Mount Berico] (in Italian). Milano: Ed. Terraferma.
- Barbieri, Giuseppe (2002). La Cattedrale di Vicenza [The Cathedral of Vicenza] (in Italian). Milano: Ed. Terraferma.
- Bison, Ofelio (1963). La chiesa di San Vincenzo martire in Vicenza [The church of St. Vincent the Martyr in Vicenza] (in Italian). Vicenza: Tip. Rumor.
- Brogliato, Bortolo (1982). 750 anni di presenza francescana nel Vicentino [750 years of Franciscan presence in the Vicenza area] (in Italian). Vicenza: Ed. Lief.
- Fochesato, Renata (2002). Santa Chiara in Vicenza, complesso monumentale e istituto Palazzolo. Storia e il restauro [Santa Chiara in Vicenza, monumental complex and Palazzolo Institute. History and the restoration] (in Italian). Vicenza.
- Graziani, Alessio Giovanni (2010). La Parrocchia dei Servi. 1810-2010. 200 anni da San Michele a Santa Maria in Foro [The Parish of the Servants. 1810-2010. 200 years from San Michele to Santa Maria in Foro.] (in Italian). Vicenza: CTO.
- Goli, Antonio (1956). Nuova chiesa parrocchiale di San Cristoforo in Bertesina di Vicenza [New parish church of San Cristoforo in Bertesina di Vicenza] (in Italian). Vicenza: Tip. Rumor.
- Kozlovic, Andrea (1988). 25 anni della storia della Parrocchia di San Paolo di Vicenza (1963-1988) [25 years of the history of St. Paul Parish in Vicenza (1963-1988)] (in Italian). Vicenza.
- Zanolo, Alba Lazzaretto (1991). La parrocchia nella Chiesa e nella società vicentina dall'età napoleonica ai nostri giorni, in Storia di Vicenza, IV/1, L'Età contemporanea [The Parish in the Church and Society of Vicenza from the Napoleonic Age to the Present Day, in History of Vicenza, IV/1, The Contemporary Age] (in Italian). Vicenza: Neri Pozza editore.
- Pacini, Gian Piero (1994). Laici, Chiesa locale, Città. Dalla Fraglia di Santa Maria alla Confraternita del Gonfalone a Vicenza (Sec. XV – XVII) [Laity, Local Church, City. From the Brotherhood of Saint Mary to the Confraternity of the Banner in Vicenza (15th – 17th centuries).] (in Italian). Vicenza: Ed. Egida.
- Parrocchia del Cuore immacolato di Maria in Vicenza. 1957-1987 brevi note storiche [Parish of the Immaculate Heart of Mary in Vicenza. 1957-1987 brief historical notes] (in Italian).
- Pranovi, Alessandra (2005). La chiesa di San Vincenzo [The church of St. Vincent] (in Italian). Vicenza: Fondazione Monte di pietà di Vicenza.
- Todescato, Giocondo Maria (1982). Origini del santuario della Madonna di Monte Berico. Indagine storica del codice del 1430 e l'inizio dei Servi di Maria al santuario [Origins of the Sanctuary of Our Lady of Mount Berico. Historical investigation of the 1430 codex and the beginning of the Servants of Mary at the shrine.] (in Italian). Vicenza: Edizione Servi di Maria.
