= Santa Maria in Araceli, Vicenza =

Church in the Veneto, Italy

Coordinates: 45.553179°N 11.549226°E

Church of Santa Maria in Araceli of Vicenza
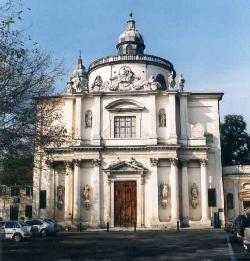

Religion
- Affiliation: Roman Catholic
- Year consecrated: 1743

Location
- Location: Vicenza, Veneto, Italy
- Interactive map of Church of Santa Maria in Araceli of Vicenza

Architecture
- Architect: Guarino Guarini
- Type: Church
- Style: Baroque
- Groundbreaking: 1672-1680
- Completed: 17th century

The church of Santa Maria in Araceli is a late-Baroque style church built in the late 17th century in Vicenza according to designs attributed to Guarino Guarini.

Documents first take note of a church at the site, dating from 1241. They refer to a church of Santa Maria in the area that stood near a convent. This convent, which in 1277 belonged to the Clarisse Nuns, was called Santa Maria ad Cellam, (referring to the nun's rooms). The suffix was then modified to alla cella, then Arcella and finally to Araceli. This church in Vicenza should not be confused with the church Santa Maria in Aracoeli (or St Mary of the Altar of Heaven) in central Rome.

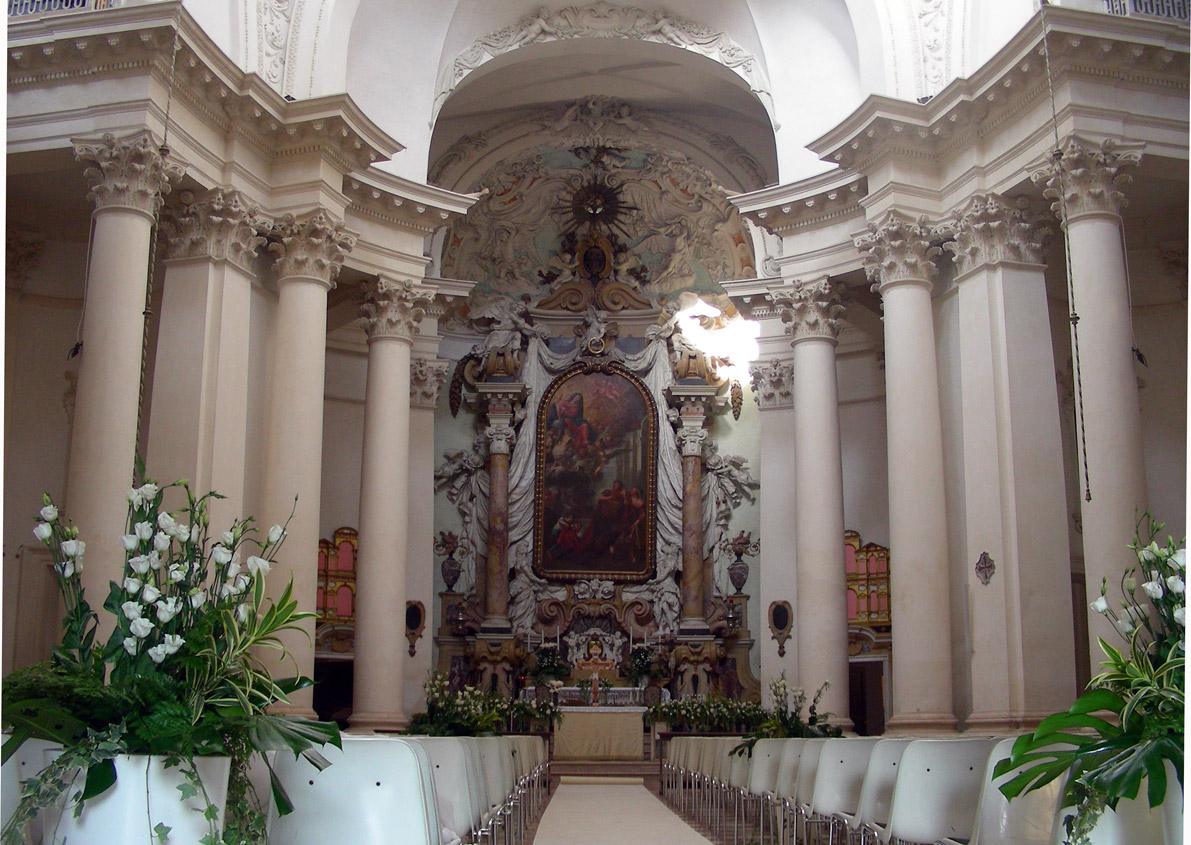
View towards Altar

Construction of the present church was begun during 1672-1680, a period during which the famous architect Guarino Guarini resided in Vicenza under the patronage of the Theatines. In 1965, designs for the church were found in the Vatican Library. Construction seems to have been guided by Carlo Borella. It was about 60 years after the start of construction, on November 17, 1743, that the church was consecrated. In 1810, during the Napoleonic occupation, the convent was expropriated, and the church became a parish church. The church was replaced by a new parish church, Cristo Re, in 1960. This church ceased being used until restoration in finished in 1990.

The main baroque altar (1696), was carved in marble by Tommaso Bezzi . It contains an altarpiece representing the Tiburtine Sybil who portends the coming Virgin and Child to the Roman Emperor Augustus attributed to Pietro Liberi . The altar on the right has a 13th-century painted crucifix, originally from church of San Vito.
