= Sword and Spurs of Giampietro de Proti =

The Sword and Spurs of Giampietro de Proti
- Parti di spada e sproni di Giampietro di Proti
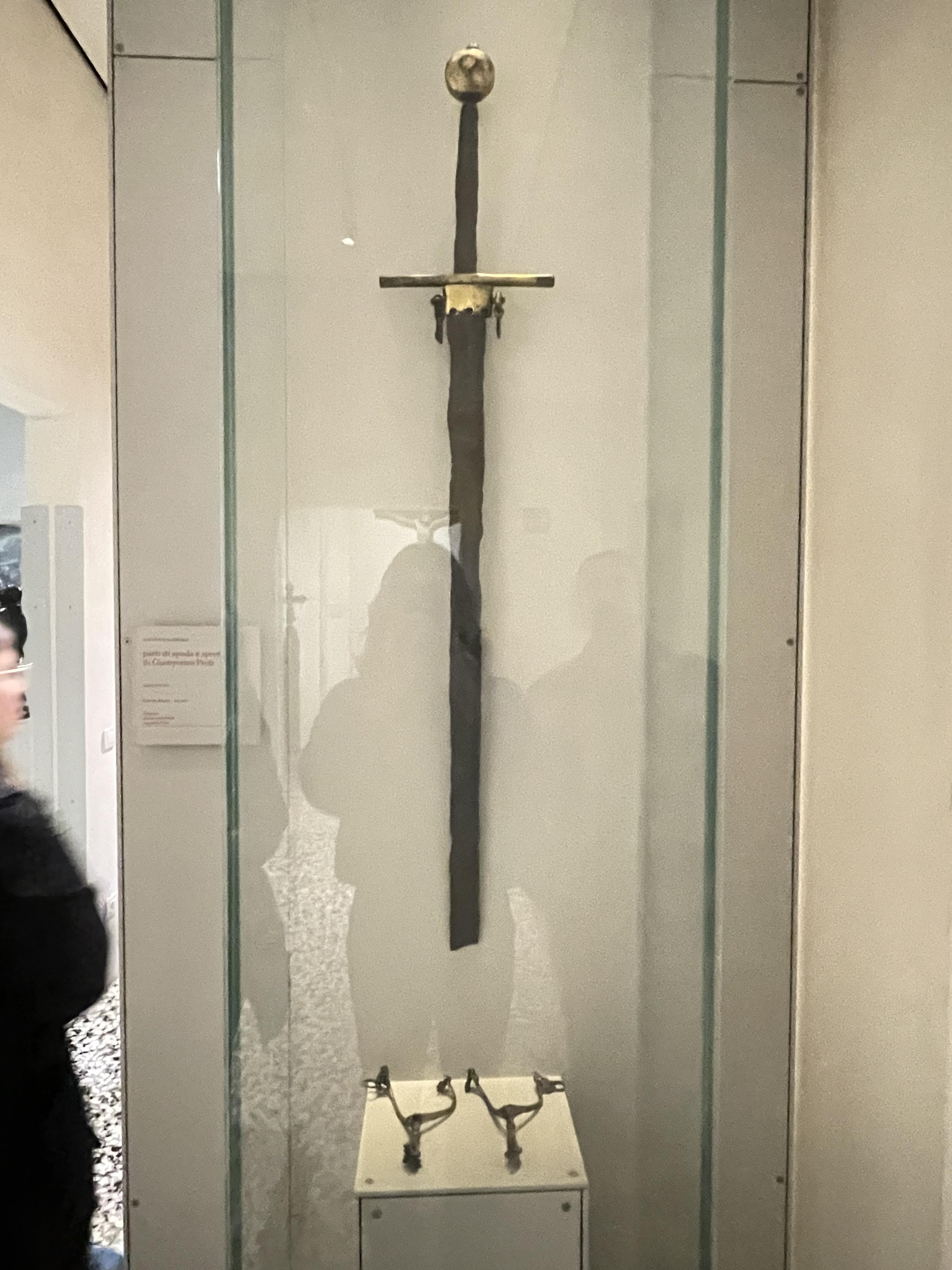
- Year: XIV-XV centuries
- Medium: Gilded bronze and steel
- Location: The Diocesan Museum, Vicenza

The Sword and Spurs of Giampietro de Proti (Italian: parti di spada e sproni di Giampietro di Proti) are articles of smithed objects dating from the late Middle Ages, between the 14th and 15th centuries. They were made by an Italian manufacturer in gilded bronze and steel. These items are linked to nobility and chivalry. They were found in the tomb of their owner and commissioner, Giampietro de Proti (1345–1412), a significant political and military figure of Vicenza. His tomb was located in the Proti chapel inside the Cathedral of Vicenza. Today, the sword and spurs are exhibited in the Museo Diocesano of Vicenza, near where they were discovered.

== History ==
=== Symbolism ===
In the high and late Middle Ages, the significance of a sword traditionally extended far beyond its role as a weapon as they were symbols of divine authority, power, status and chivalry used not only by the martial elite but also among the burgeoning middle class. A name and design represented the status and wealth of an owner. At the same time, a sword was a weapon of war, not only something to be admired. Within the warrior elite, sword owners were ranked higher than those not owning a sword, both martially and socially. However, as firearms emerged and technology advanced, the significance of the sword endured mostly in ceremonial and civilian contexts through duels, ceremonies and the arts.

Importantly, swords were also adorned with inscriptions, which often indicated the maker's mark or religious invocations. The transition from maker's marks to religious phrases on sword blades suggests a shift in attitudes reflecting the increasing sacralization of the medieval warrior class. Yet, as prominent amateur historian Ewart Oakeshott argued, inscriptions are often open to extremely varied interpretations without the proper historical and cultural context since medieval swords were most often decorated for “sentimental, unsophisticated, deeply religious, superstitious and illiterate people who had to rely upon them in heat of battle.”

=== Giampietro de Proti ===
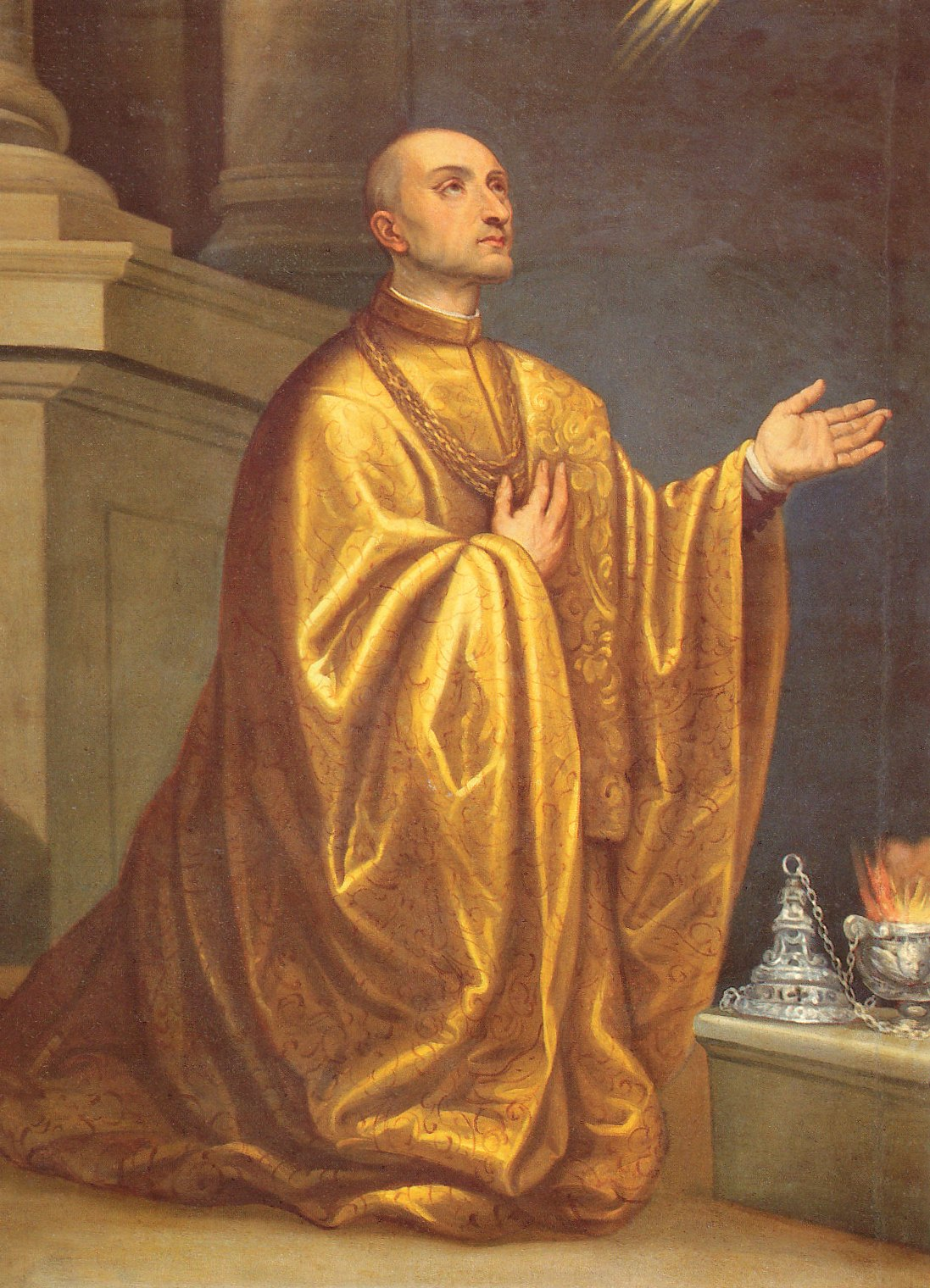
Portrait of a Venetian artist in the XVII^{th} century

Giampietro de Proti was an Italian politician and a significant military figure, particularly known from the tumultuous events in Vicenza and Venice in 1404. Born into a prominent family (Jacopo Dal Verme among his ancestors), he was also related to the major noble families in his hometown, including the Thiene, the Sesso and the Loschi.

The legacy of De Proti has been key to the events of 1404 between Vicenza and Venice. Following the occupation of Verona, an Italian leader from Padua, Francesco III da Carrara, headed towards Vicenza, besieged it with a huge army and demanded its unconditional surrender, which was refused by the city and De Proti, and thus resulted in a forceful attack by the Paduan army.

Aiming to secure Vicenza's future and recognizing the strategic importance of aligning with Venice, De Proti led a successful diplomatic mission to the Doge of Venice, Michele Steno, soon after which Vicenza was integrated into the Republic of Venice. Although this pivotal moment garnered De Proti substantial honors and rewards from Venice, this also meant that political sovereignty of Vicenza was lost in return. It is also noteworthy that his only son was murdered by the Marosticans, so De Proti did not have a male heir.

=== The last will ===
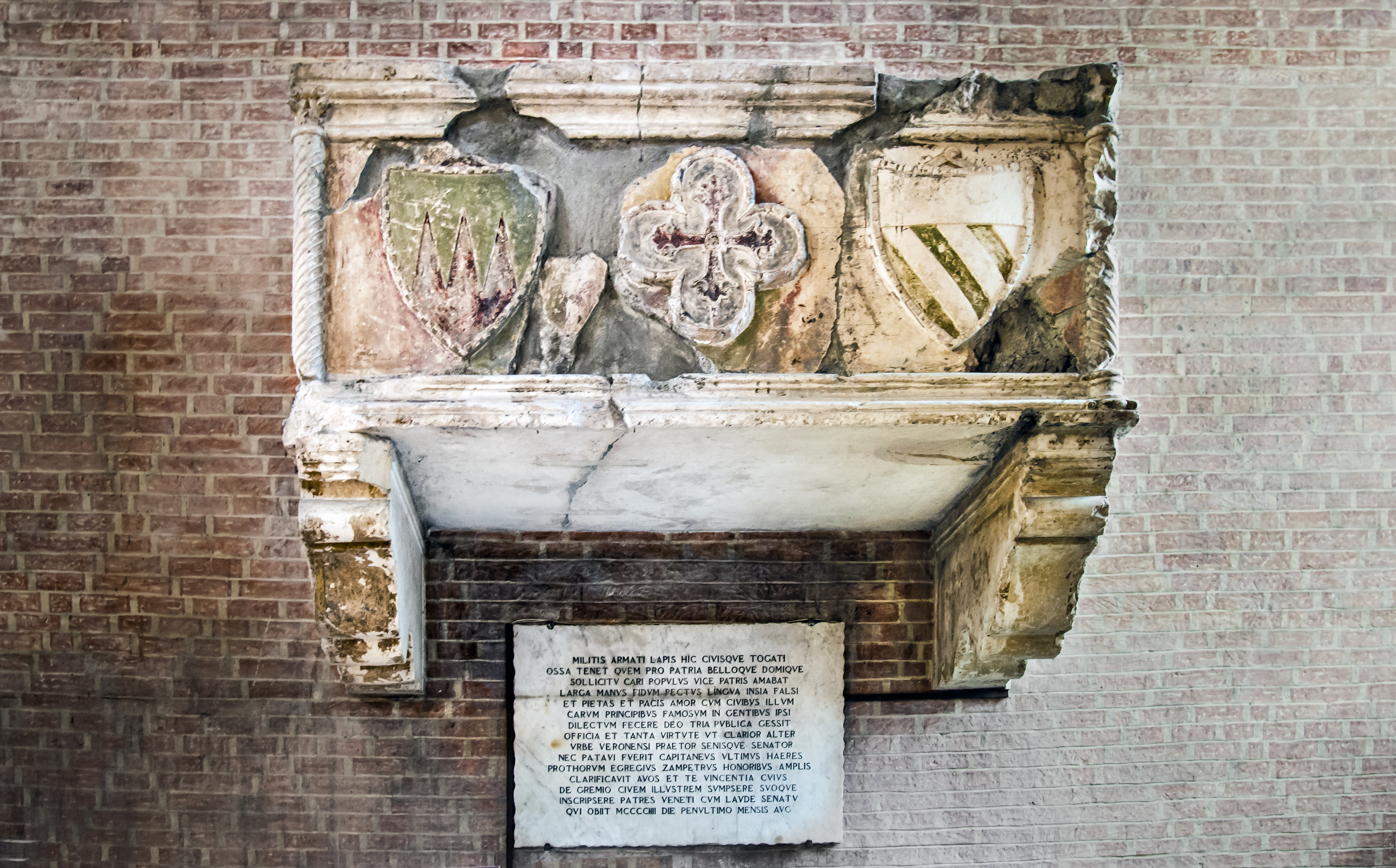
Tomb of Giampietro de Proti inside Vicenza's cathedral

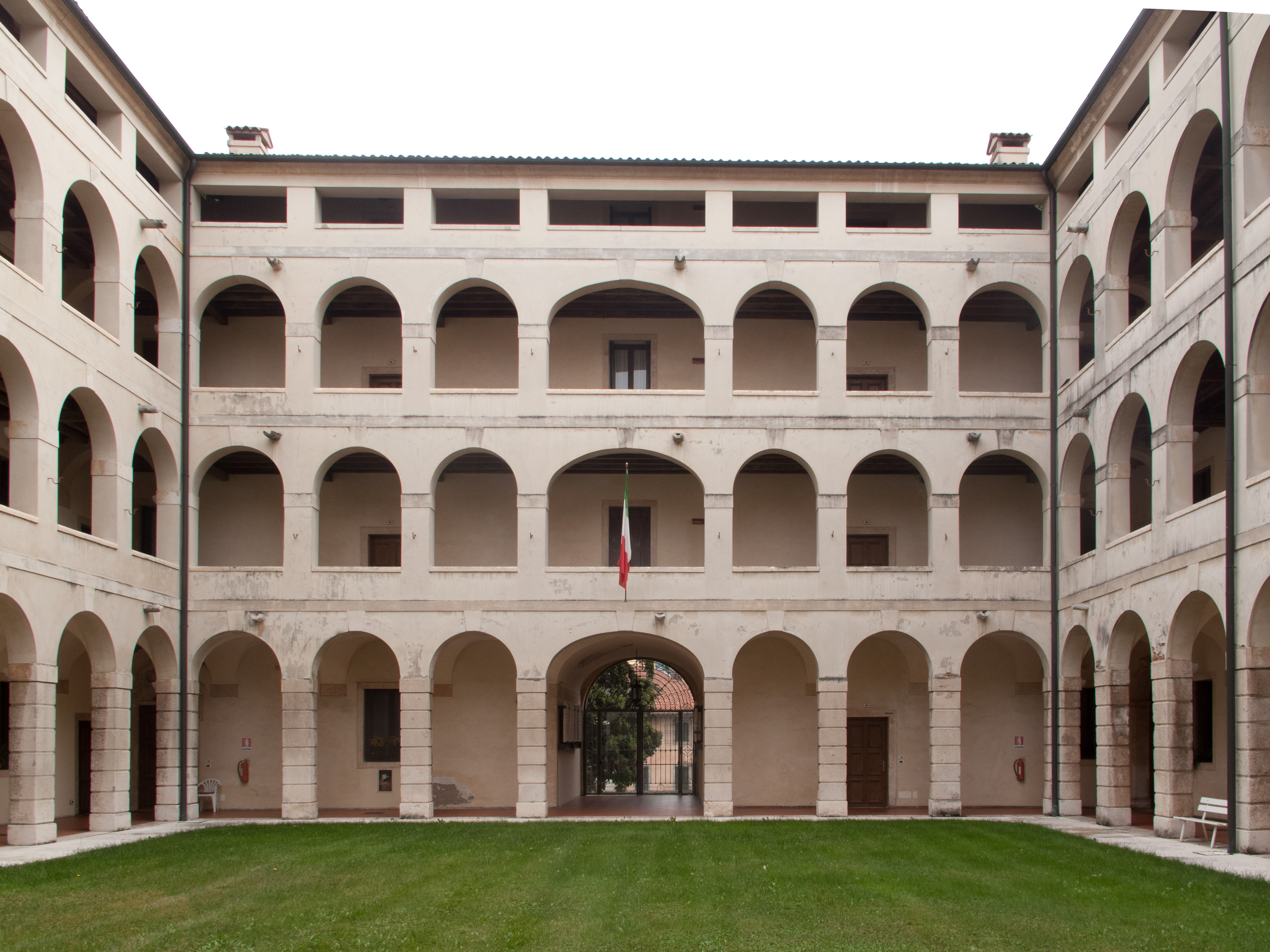
Hospice and oratory of Giampietro de Proti

In his last will and testament of 1412, De Proti entailed a detailed description of how he wanted his funeral to look like, which served as a grand commemoration of his life and accomplishments, ensuring his memory would endure in the annals of history.

The testament also expressed his deep concern for the welfare of the citizens of Vicenza. Aiming to endure his commitment to service even after death, he bequeathed a significant part of his wealth to establish an institution that would aid the impoverished nobility. Thus, Giampietro de Proti is also known for the welfare institute (Italian: L'istituto Proti-Vajenti-Malacarne), a retirement home for the elderly in Vicenza, which was named after him and exists until present (Italian: Ospizio e oratorio dei Proti, 2022).

== Description ==
=== Sword ===
There is a difference between a combat weapon and a ceremonial or symbolic weapon. In the late Middle Ages, and since some centuries, the swords that are used for combat were often double-handed, and were called claymore. They were more practical and handy thanks to the equilibrium that it provides. The simple-handed swords, like the one of De Proti, were sometimes used as a last resort in case of a face-to-face duel, but they took another purpose when kings and sovereignty started to dub knights with it, and it began to take a symbolic feature which is a symbol of power and influence. But also, a new type of simple-handed swords appeared in Western Europe at the end of the 13th century: thrust swords and foils. So, the simple-handed sword with a double-sided blade became purely symbolic, as a way to determine the social status of the owner, and their political function.

=== Spurs ===
Spurs, are another way to symbolize the importance of the figure of De Proti, because it is an instrument of the cavalry, and particularly in chivalry. It is globally a way to enhance the movements of the legs of the horse rider, to keep balance and stay mounted, and also to apply pressure to the horses' skin, so it can react quickly. The richer they seem, the better was the knight, but also the richer. The small toothed wheel (rowel) at the end is the tool to direct the horse, and the metallic frames surround the boot for improved balance. As simple as it seems, they were certainly used for parade and display, and those of De Proti were worn to emphasize his military skills.

=== Meaning and Shape ===
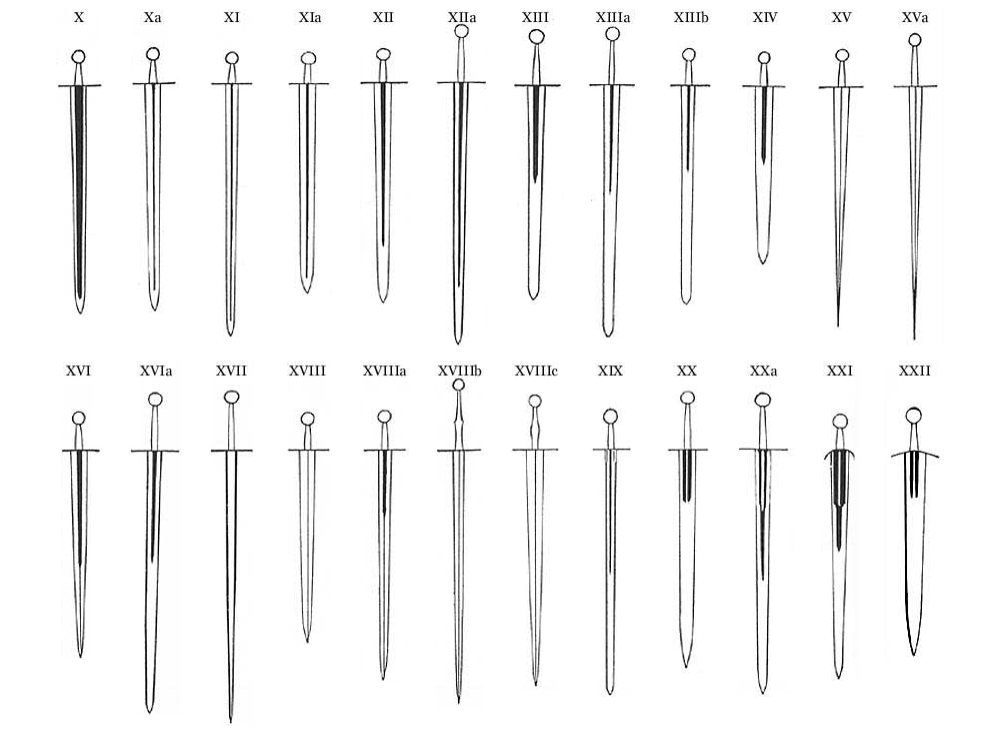
Different type of blades of the Oakeshott typology

Different type of sword cross section of the Oakeshott typology

The simple-handed sword as a hexagonal blade perimeter; with a type XIIIa kind of shape, according to the Oakeshott typology, made by Oakeshott, an English philosopher and theorist that created a sword typology in order to make a glossary.

The guard and the cope of the swords are in gilded bronze, and the cope is decorated with circle-shaped holes, realized precisely, which testifies the preciousness of the item, because precision in forging is expensive and difficult. The knob also is decorated with a circle outgrowth, that was utilized during fights to smash the skull of enemies, it is a symbol of brutal power and authority. Also, the scabbard is missing, but usually, they are the most decorated pieces of a sword, and we know for sure that it also contained gilded bronze, because in the typical way of creating a sword, the material used for the guard and the cope is the same for the cope and the bouterolle of the scabbard.

You can tell the difference between a combat sword and a ceremonial sword with the shape of the blade., with the gutter. In the center of the blade, in combat weapon, there is a linear gutter. In the legends, it says that it is for letting the blood of the opponent smear the sword, but in fact, it was for lighten the weight to be more practical, and also for an economy of material, because iron was quite expensive. As for the ceremonial swords, often, there is no need for a gutter, so the swords were more in shapes like diamond, hexagonal or lenticular.

As for the spurs, they are matching the sword, with the same material used, giving a matching color. The toothed wheels are here, also testifying a very precise, so precious blacksmith skill. They are also thin, which confirm that they were in fact used for parade and that's it, because if it was for serious horse riding, they would have been more robust.

== Posterity ==
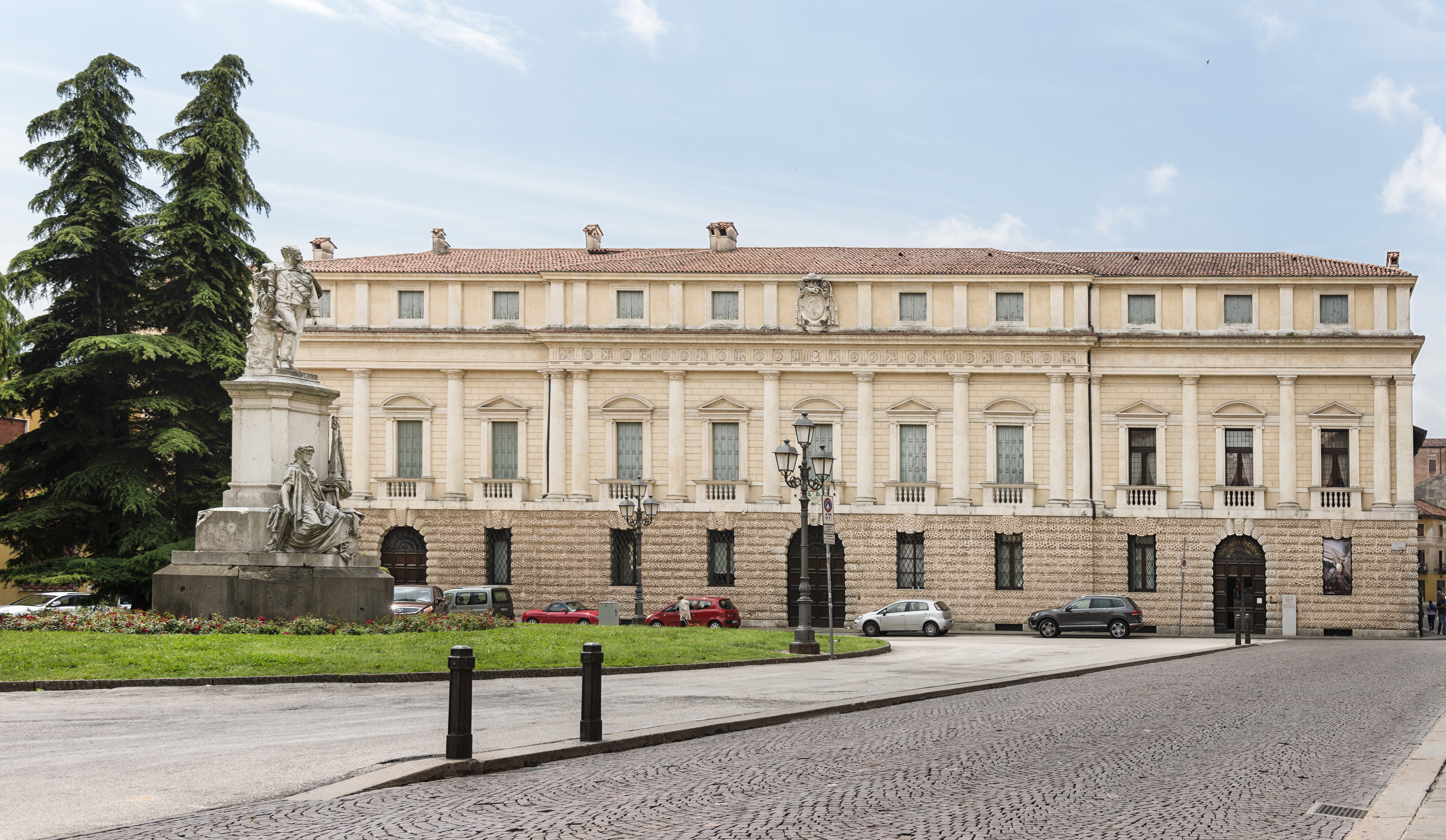
Facade of the Museo Diocesano of Vicenza

Due to the lack of written sources about the period of its exhumation and when it was placed inside the permanent collections of the museum, these objects needed different articles and point of views to understand them fully. However, we know that it was preserved until today by the diocese and mostly by the bishop Pietro Marco Zaguri who guided these artworks during the troubled Napoleonic suppressions.

We also know that it was placed with Giampietro de Proti inside of his tomb, as he was the most important figure of the Quattrocento in Vicenza, and with a very normative testimony, was buried with all honors inside of the cathedral. The precious metalworks in the same style were still produced after and followed its shape, for the bishops and other important noblemen it was a way to engrave their name and follow the path of Giampietro and raise their status to his. Thus, it was possible to pick information from the object itself by speaking through its function and with reliable articles from the cathedral or biographies of Giampietro de Proti, even though contemporary sources may have been lost by time.

== See also ==
- Cathedral of Vicenza
- Oakeshott typology
- Quattrocento

== Bibliography ==
- Brunning, S. (2019) The Sword in Early Medieval Northern Europe: Experience, Identity, Representation (NED-New edition). Boydell & Brewer. Available at: https://doi.org/10.2307/j.ctv136bw1r
- Deutscher, L., Kaiser, M., & Wetzler, S. (Eds.) (2019) The Sword: Form and Thought. Suffolk: Boydell & Brewer. Available at: https://doi.org/10.2307/j.ctvfrxrbx.
- Duby, G. La Chevalerie (1994), issu d’Encyclopedia Universalis, essay based on the work of “Les origines de la chevalerie”. Paris: Librairie Académique Perrin. Available at: https://www-universalis-edu-com.ressources-electroniques.univ-lille.fr/encyclopedie/chevalerie/).
- Foulques-Delanos, L., Manuel héraldique ou Clef de l’art du blason, Limoges, Octobre 1816, “extracts of a text mentioning the symbolic of the spurs”.
- Gasparini, F. (2012) Santa Maria Annunciata, Guida storico-artistica, Vicenza.
  Gauvard, C., De Libera, A., Zink, M. (2004) Dictionnaire du Moyen âge, Paris, éditions Quadrige/puf. Available at: https://blason-armoiries.org/heraldique/e/eperon.htm.
- Jones, Robert W. (2023) A Cultural History of the Medieval Sword: Power, Piety and Play. Suffolk: Boydell & Brewer. Available at: https://doi.org/10.2307/j.ctv134vjs6.
- Lobach, D. (2018) “Medieval Sources of the Modern Symbolic Meaning of the Sword” in Advances in Social Science, Education and Humanities Research, Vol. 283. Available at: https://www.atlantis-press.com/article/25906624.pdf.
- Louineau, V. (2019) “Les épées médiévales, évolution morphologique et sacralisation d’une arme (XI e - XVe siècles), thesis published in Actes de journées d’études. Available at: https://annalesdejanua.edel.univ-poitiers.fr/index.php?id=1924.
- Mairey, A. (2019) Des âges de la chevalerie (XI e -XV e siècles)? Approche historiographique, “Repenser l’histoire des mondes européens du Moyen age jusqu'au XXI e siècle”. Rennes: University Press of Rennes, 2019, p. 55 - 69. Available at: https://shs.hal.science/halshs-02409250/document.
- Marini, P., Napione, E., Varanini, G.M. (exhibition curators) (2004) Cangrande della Scala: la morte e il corredo di un principe nel Medioevo europeo, Venice.
- Oakeshott, E. (1991) Records of the Medieval Sword. Suffolk: Boydell Press.
- Ranzoli, A. (2022) La Carità a Vicenza: i luoghi e le immagini, catalogo della mostra. Vicenza: Basilica Palladiana ( 20 aprile-14 luglio 2002), a cura di C. Rigoni, pp. 205–209.
- Rigoni, C. (2002) La carità a Vicenza: i luoghi e le immagini, catalogo della mostra. Vicenza: Basilica Palladiana (20 aprile-14 luglio 2002), a cura di C. Rigoni, p. 233.
- Scalini, M. La carità a Vicenza: i luoghi e le immagini, catalogo della mostra. Vicenza: Basilica Palladiana (20 aprile-14 luglio 2002), a cura di C. Rigoni, p. 233.
- Sone, C. G. (1999) A Glossary of the Construction, Decoration and Use of Arms and Armor in All Countries and in All Times Together With Some Closely Related Subjects. New York: Dover Books.
- Taddeï, F. and Taddeï, M. (2021) D’art D’art, l’intégrale, Paris, éditions du chêne, p. 66 - 68, p. 72.
