= Vicenza Cathedral =

Coordinates: 45°32′46″N 11°32′37″E

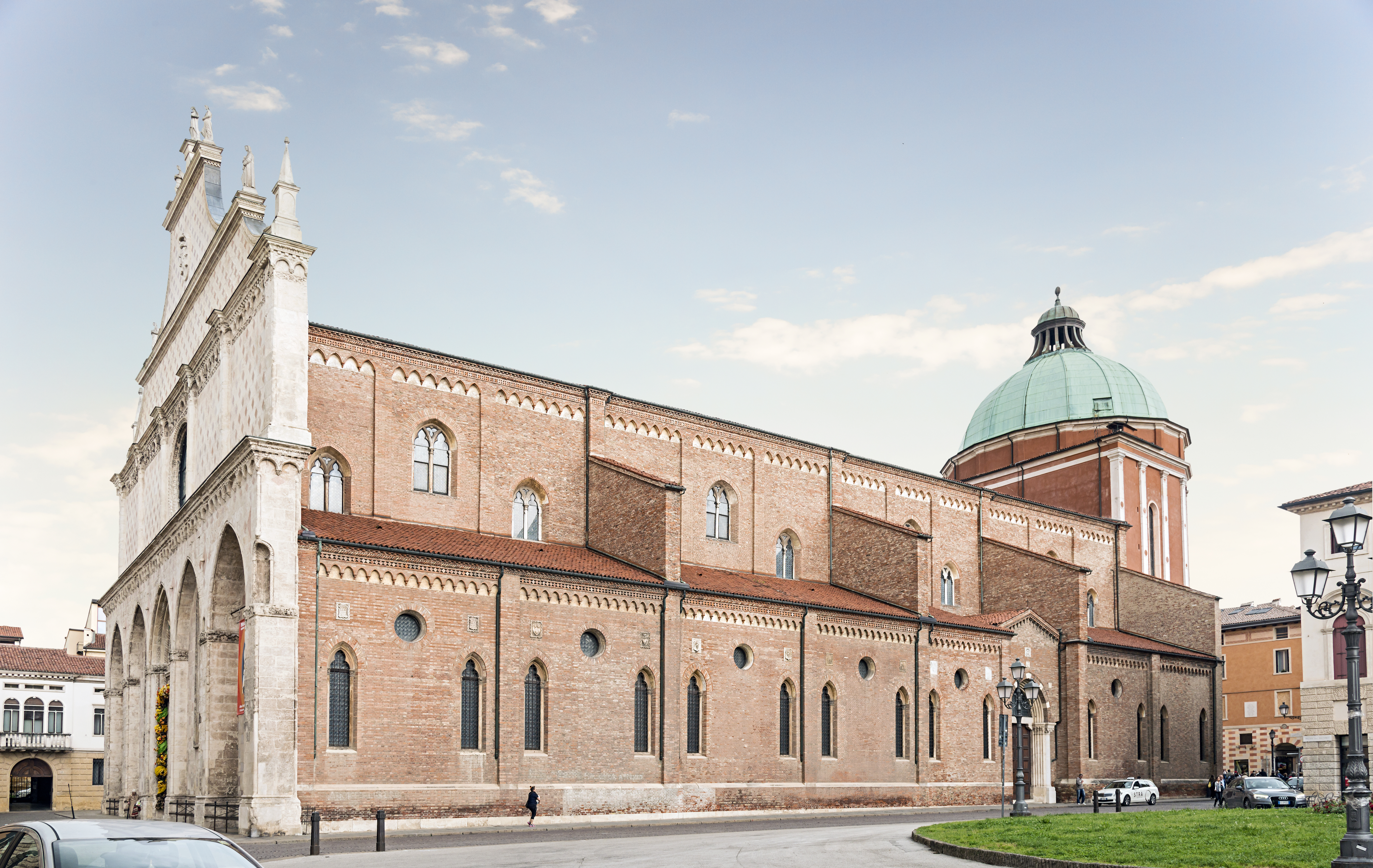
The cathedral seen from Piazza del Domo

Vicenza Cathedral (Italian: Cattedrale di Santa Maria Annunziata, Duomo di Vicenza) is a Roman Catholic cathedral in Vicenza, Veneto, northern Italy. It is the seat of the Bishop of Vicenza, and is dedicated to the Annunciation of the Virgin Mary.

== History ==
Construction of the cathedral was begun in 1482, to plans by Lorenzo of Bologna, and completed in the 1560s. The cupola was planned by Andrea Palladio and probably the north doorway also.

Only the original façade survived the bombing of World War II; the rest of the present building has been reconstructed.

The maestri di cappella include Fra Ruffino d'Assisi (1525–31), Nicola Vicentino (1563–65), Giammateo Asola and his pupil Leone Leoni (1588–1627).

== Exterior ==
=== Façade - Gable ===
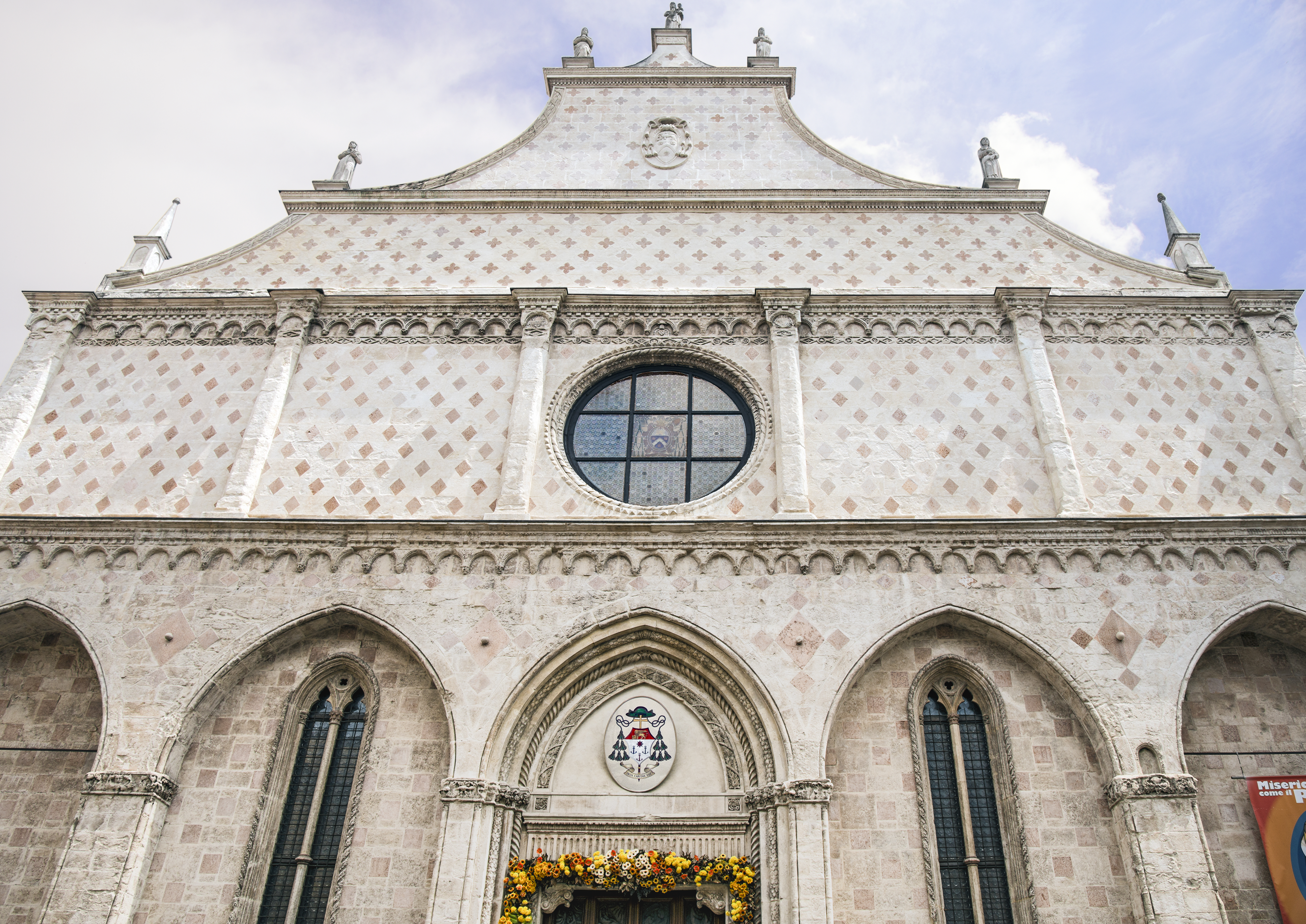
Façade - Gable

The original façade is Gothic and attributed to Domenico da Venezia 16th century. It is divided into four sections: the lower one has five arches in transoms, the second with arches in the center of an oculus, the third is smooth, the fourth is decorated with five statues (and two pinnacles added in 1948).

=== Dome ===
Vicenza Cathedral
UNESCO World Heritage Site
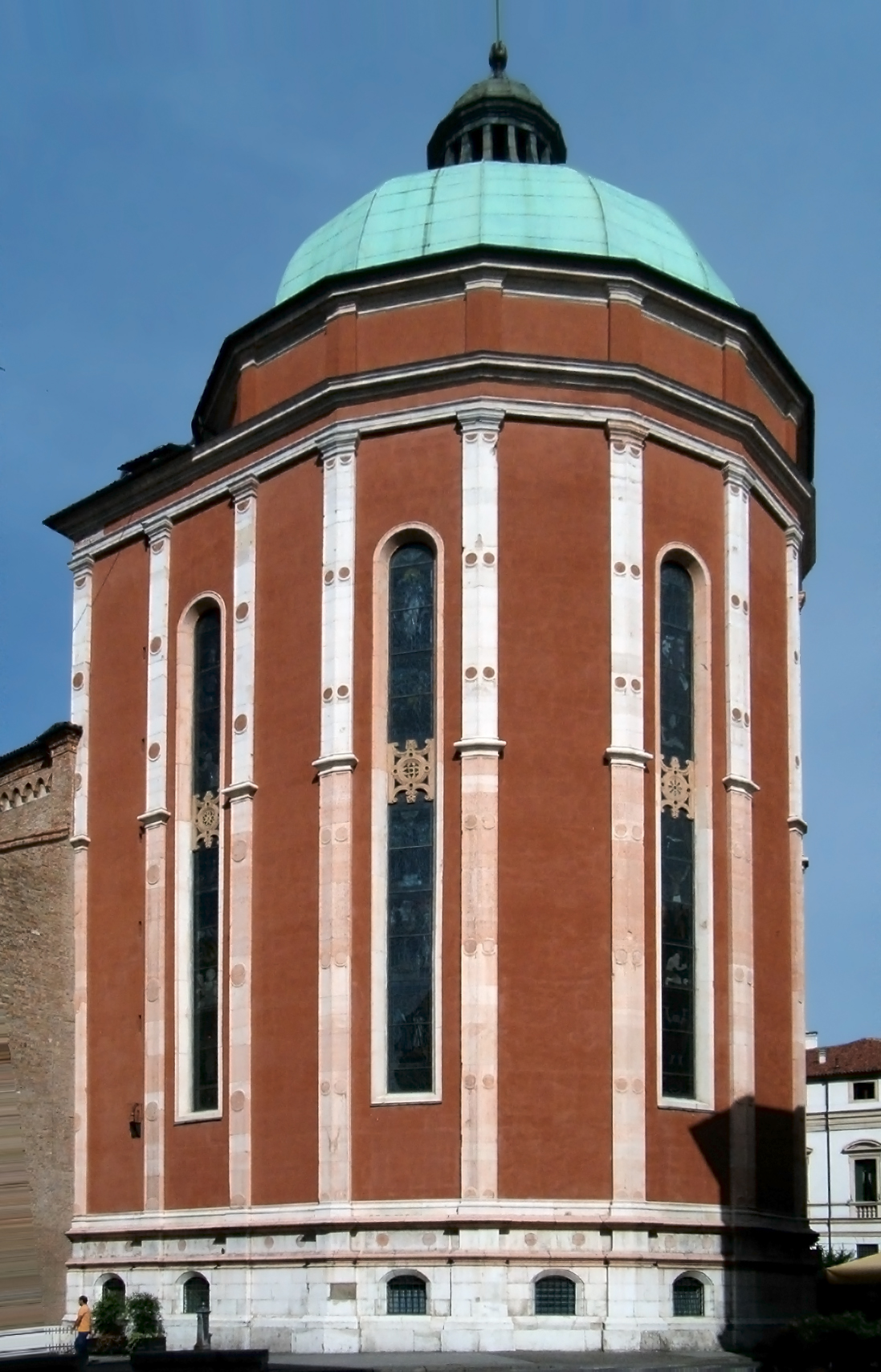

- Location within Veneto Location within Italy
- Location: Vicenza, Province of Vicenza, Veneto, Italy
- Part of: City of Vicenza and the Palladian Villas of the Veneto
- Criteria: Cultural: (i)(ii)
- Reference: 712bis-001
- Inscription: 1994 (18th Session)

The construction of the apse in the Cathedral of Vicenza had begun in 1482 to the design of Lorenzo da Bologna, but in 1531 it was still unfinished. Early, temporary, roofing was erected in 1540, as a result of the possibility that Vicenza might host the Church Council which in the end was held at Trent.

Only in 1557 did the Comune of Vicenza receive the financial means necessary from the Republic of Venice, in the shape of a bequest left by Bishop Zeno at the beginning of the century, and were therefore able to set in motion the work's completion.

Andrea Palladio, the author of the new project, most probably drew up an overall design which was however executed in two phases: from 1558 to 1559 the main cornice was built over the windows and the drum raised, while from 1564 to January 1566 the dome itself was constructed. The characteristic form of the lantern, abstract and devoid of decoration, was replicated on the summit of the cupolas of San Giorgio Maggiore in Venice (planned in the same years), and is also present in some of Palladio's reconstructions of centrally planned antique temples, such as the Mausoleum of Romulus on the Via Appia.

Since 1994, the dome, together with other Palladian buildings in and around Vicenza, has been part of the UNESCO World Heritage Site City of Vicenza and the Palladian Villas of the Veneto.

=== The bell tower ===
It is slightly detached from the church and placed in the street that runs along the south side of the cathedral. It rests on a 10th-century stone base, the bell tower dates from the twelfth century and has five bells, in the chord of Eb, the oldest still in place was cast in the seventeenth century.

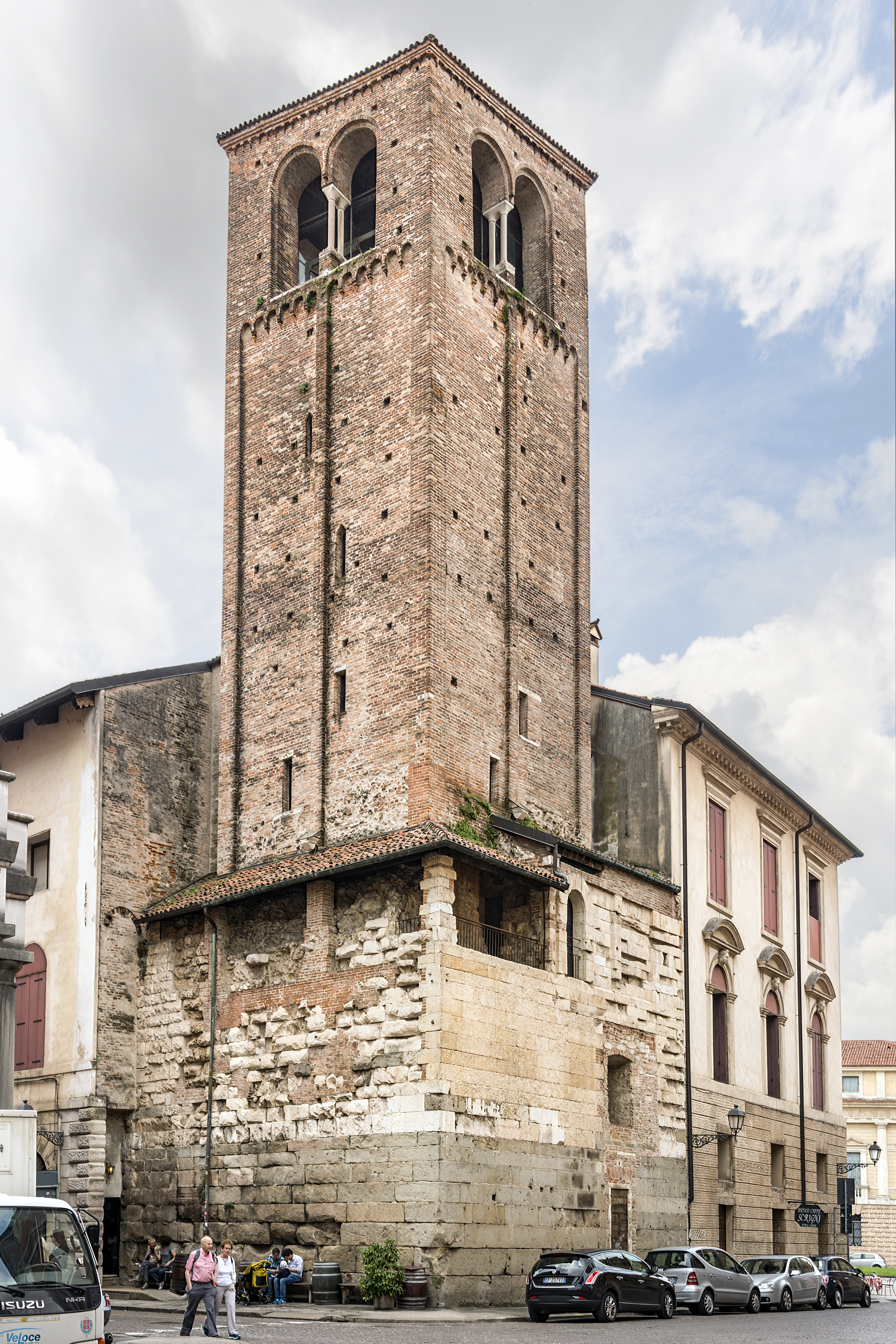
The bell tower

== Interior ==
Left nave

- The Thiene chapel, 1st chapel on the left, houses the funerary monument (1544) to Lavinia Thiene, by Giulio Romano and on the right wall, a cenotaph with the arms of the Thiene family and St Cajetan of Thiene.
- 2nd chapel on the left houses an oil on canvas altarpiece depicting an Adoration of the Virgin with Angels (1581) by Alessandro Maganza
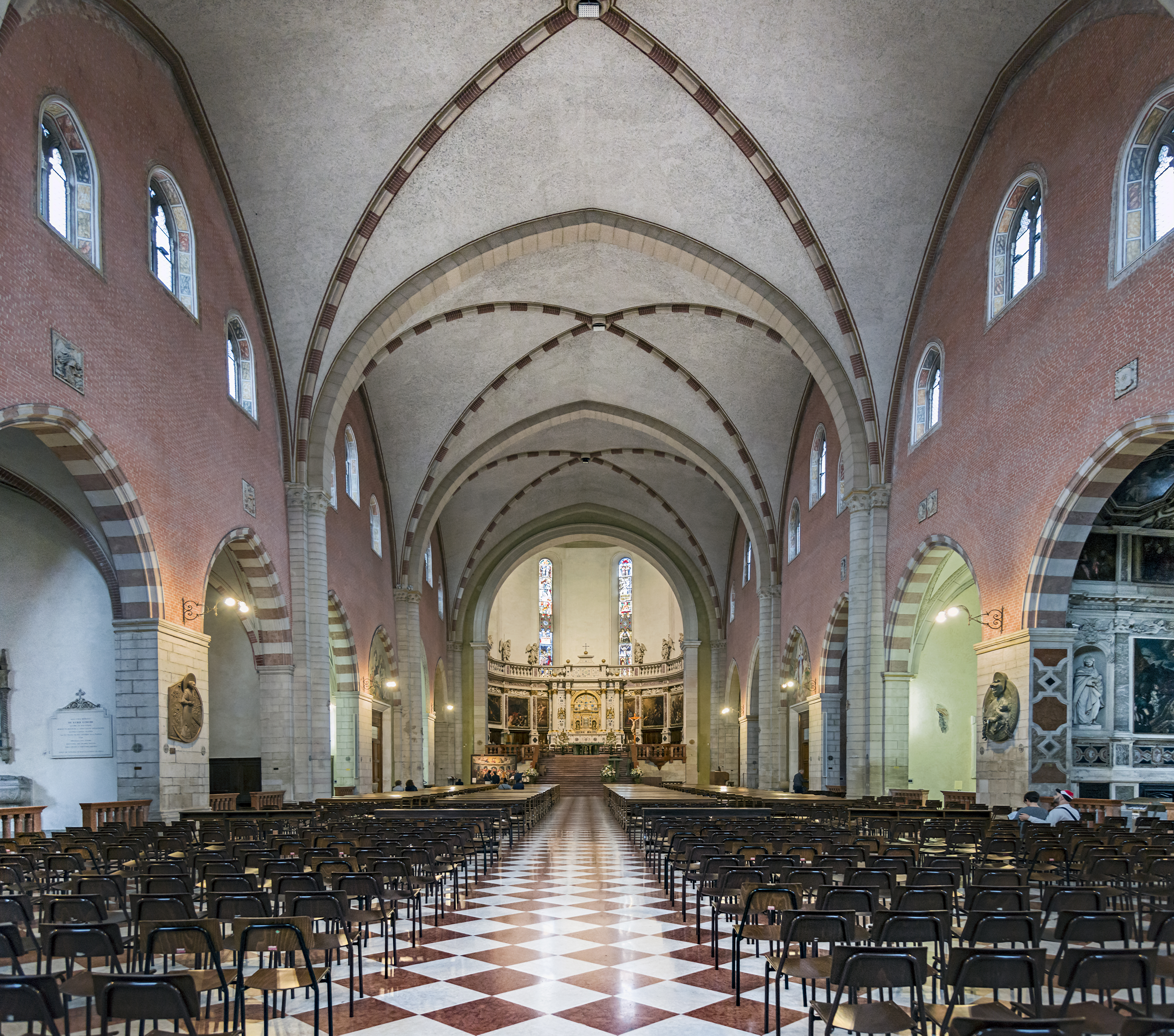
View of interior

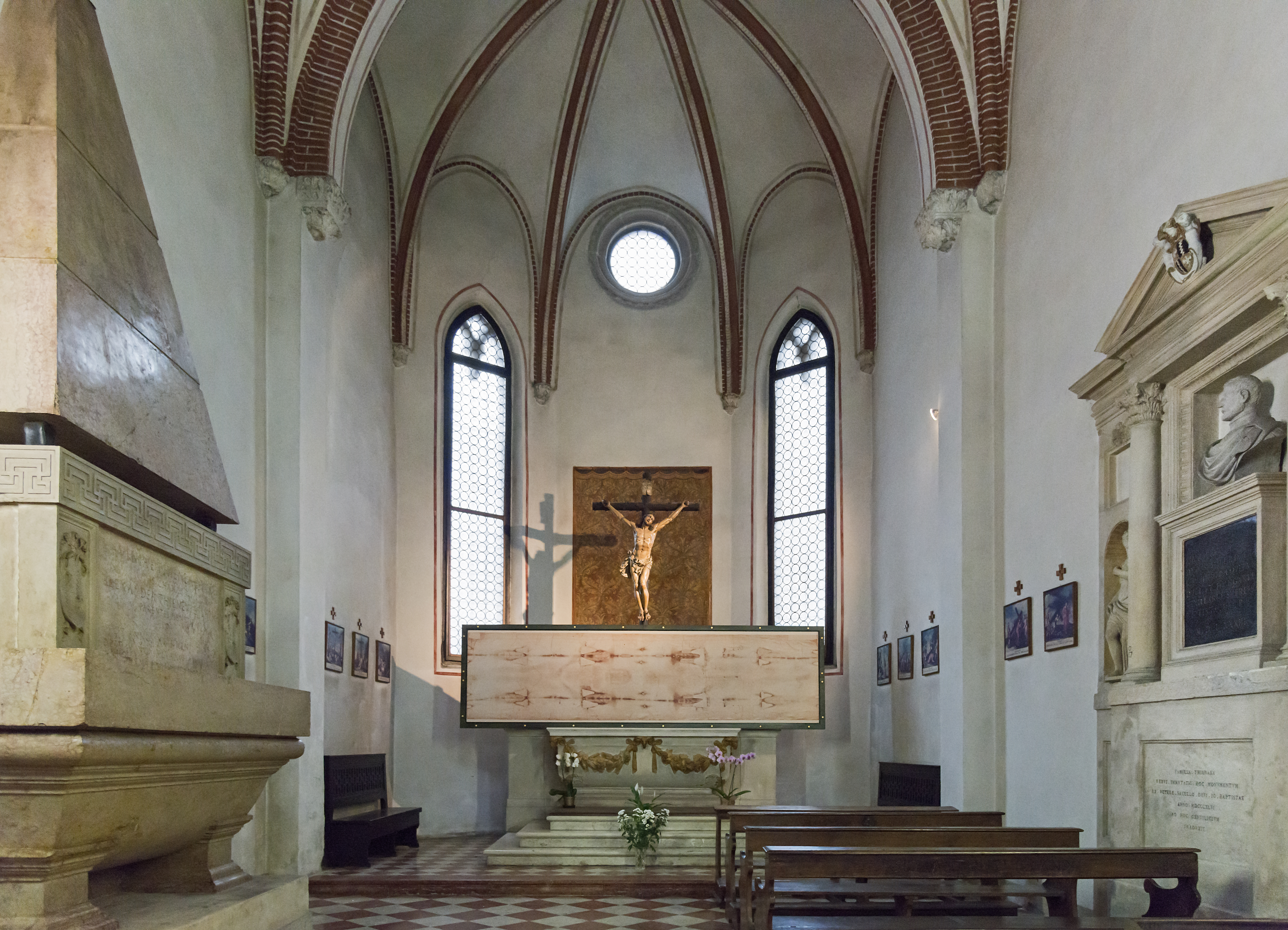
Thiene Chapel

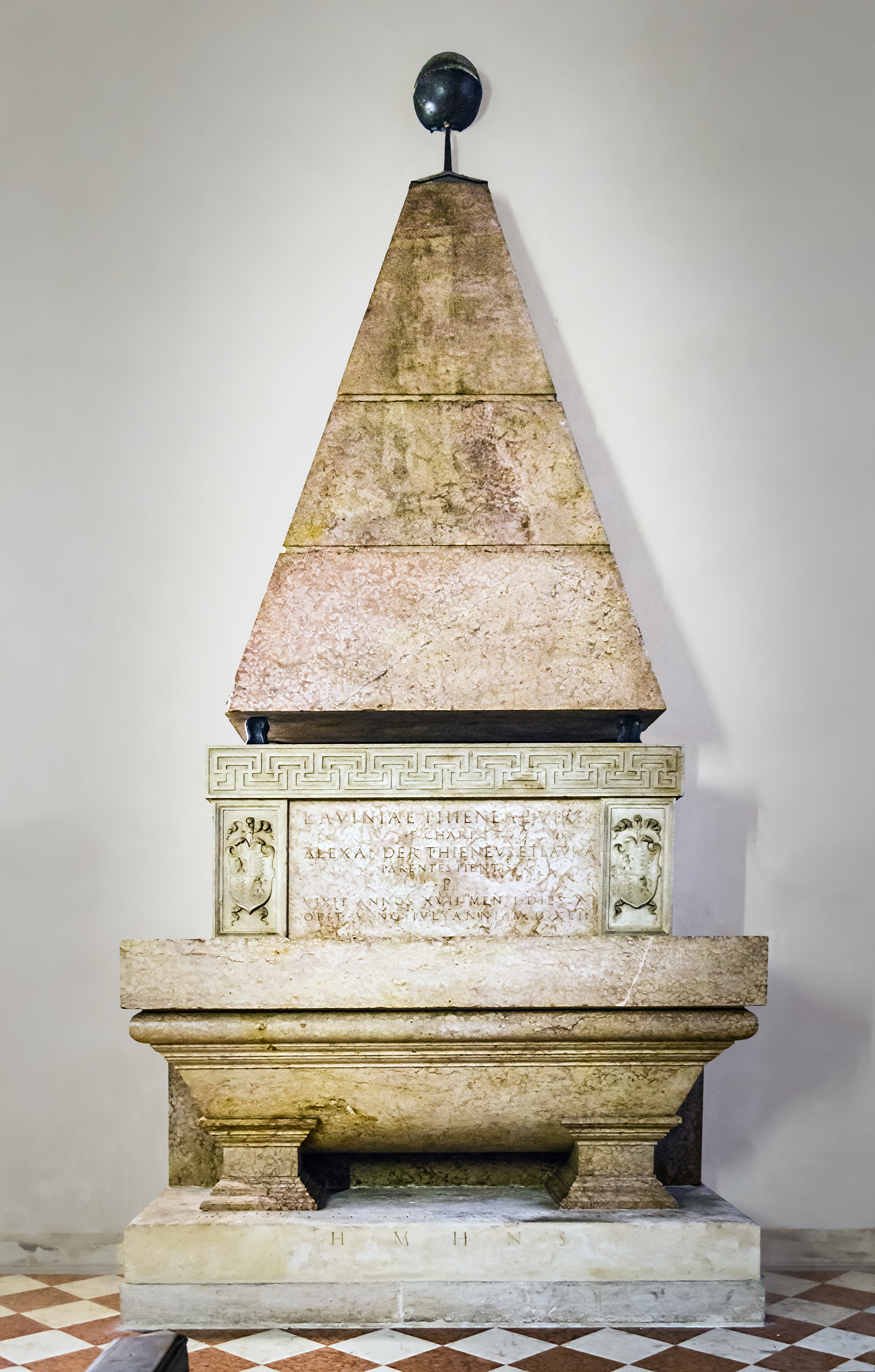
Monument to Lavinia Thiene by Giulio Romano

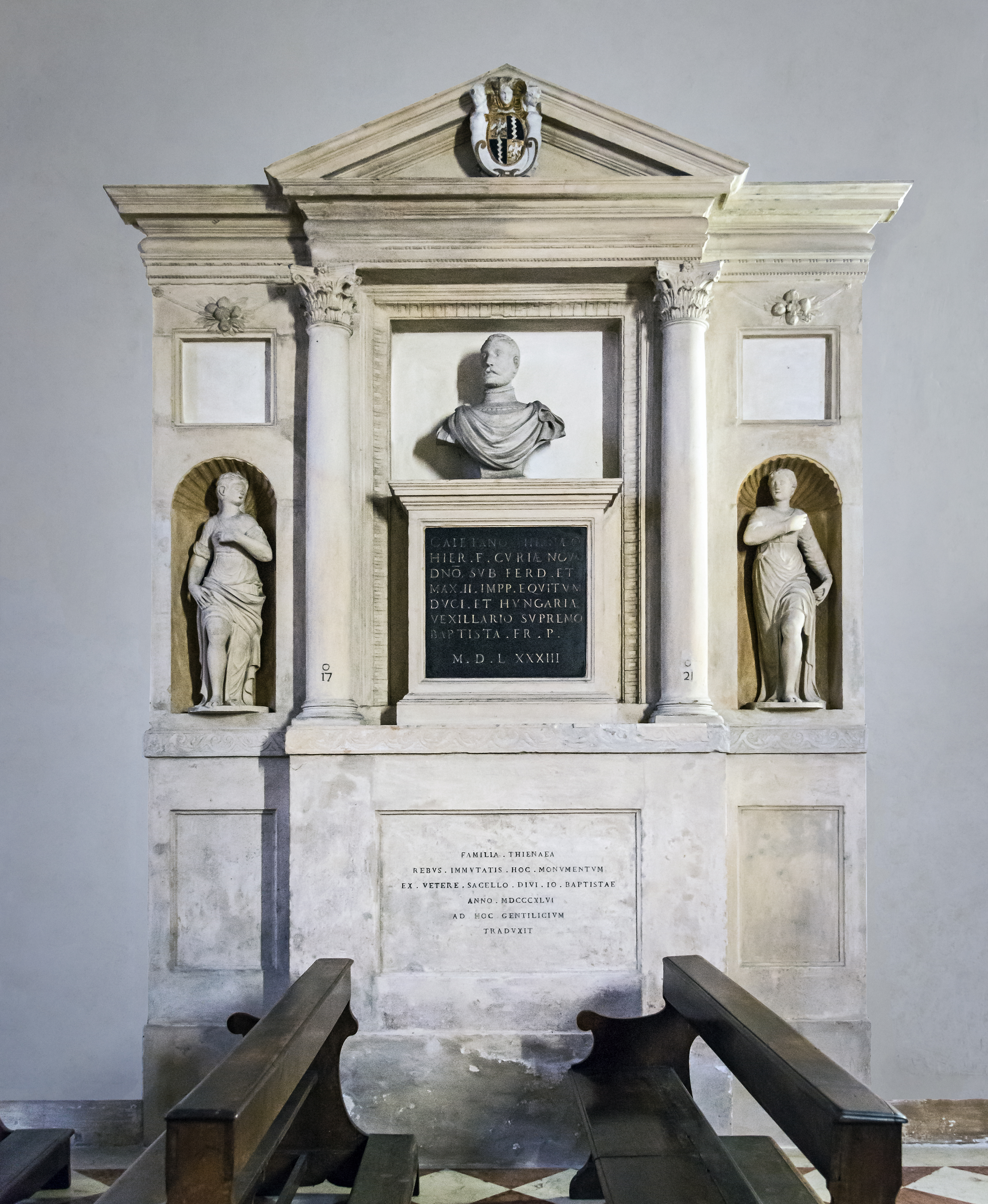
Cenotaph of the Thiene family and Saint Cajetan

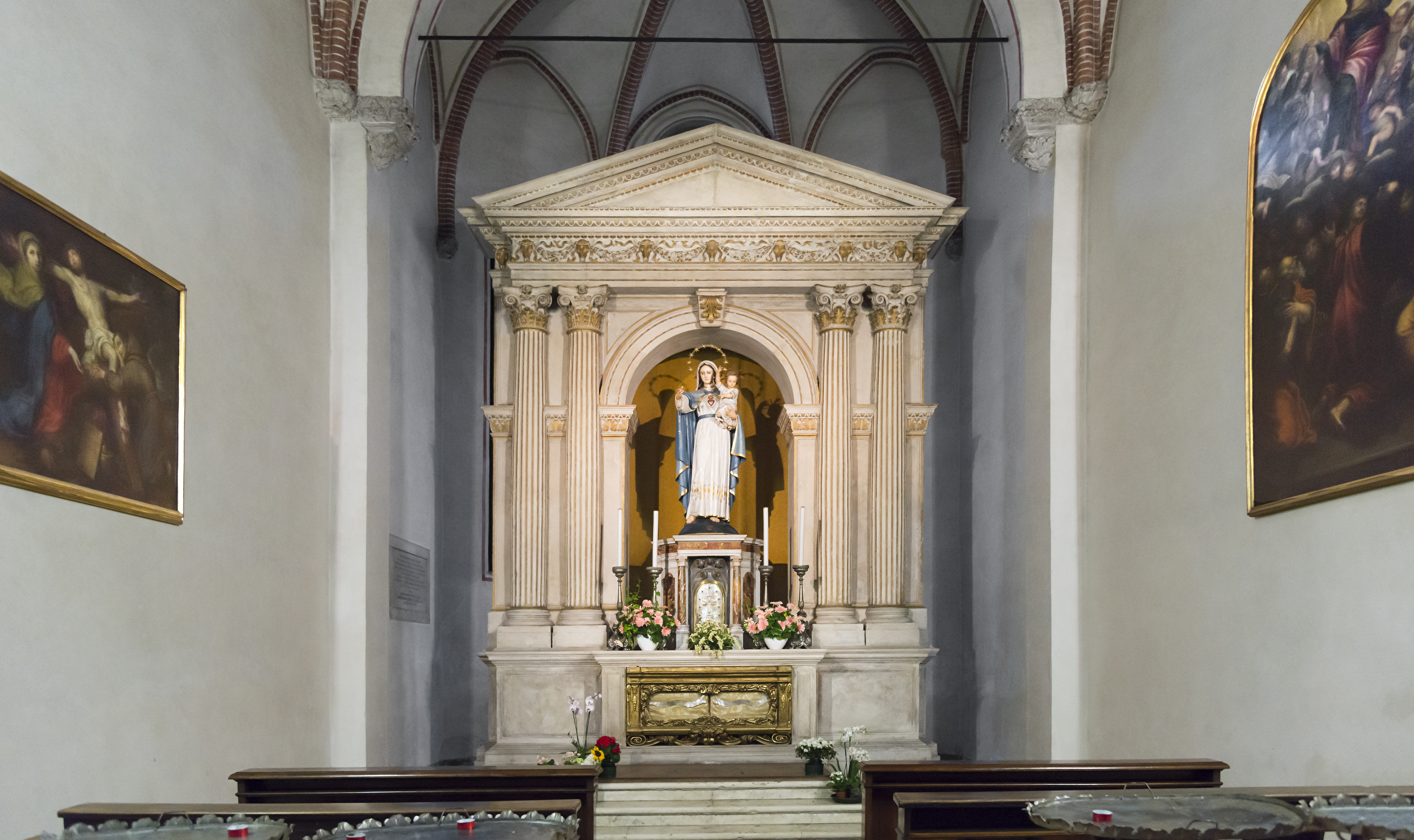
Second chapel on the left

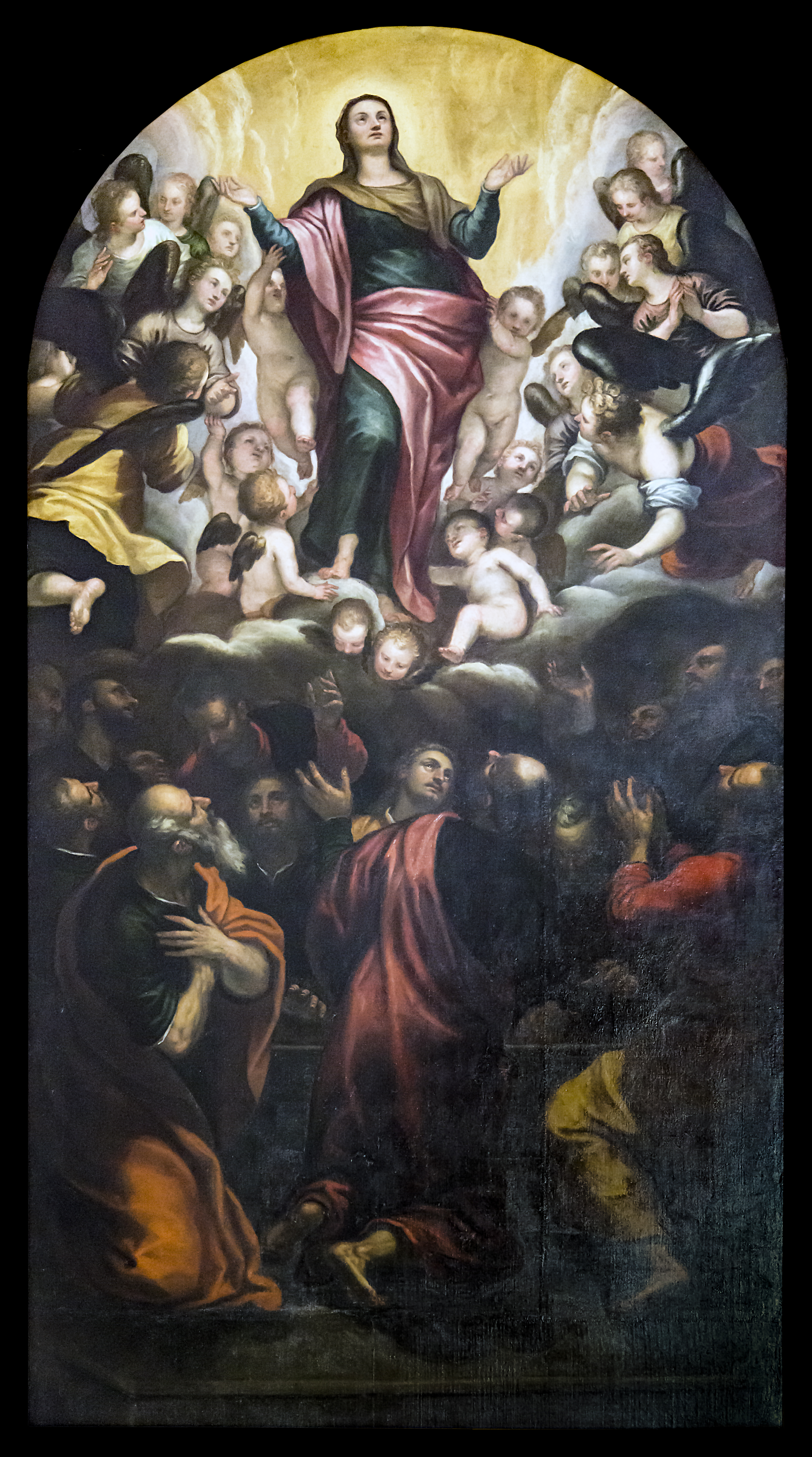
Adorazione della Vergine con gli Angeli by Alessandro Maganza
- Third chapel on the left dedicated to the Loschi family. Above the altarpiece are the arms of the family. Tombstones of Alfonso and Antonio Loschi.
- The fourth chapel on the left shows an oil on canvas Madonna and child between Saints Magdalene and Lucy by Bartolomeo Montagna
- Fifth chapel on the left : Chapel of the Incoronata or Gonfalone built in 1426 by the ancient fraglia of Santa Maria, transformed around 1591 in the Confraternity of the Gonfalone.

The altarpiece depicts Coronation of the Virgin (1448), by Antonino di Niccolò of Venice. Bas-relief in polychrome stone, representing Christ before the Lord who crowns Mary, kneeling on the right.
On the left wall the funerary monument of Girolamo Bencucci, known in France as Jérôme Sclede, bishop of the ancient diocese of Vaison.

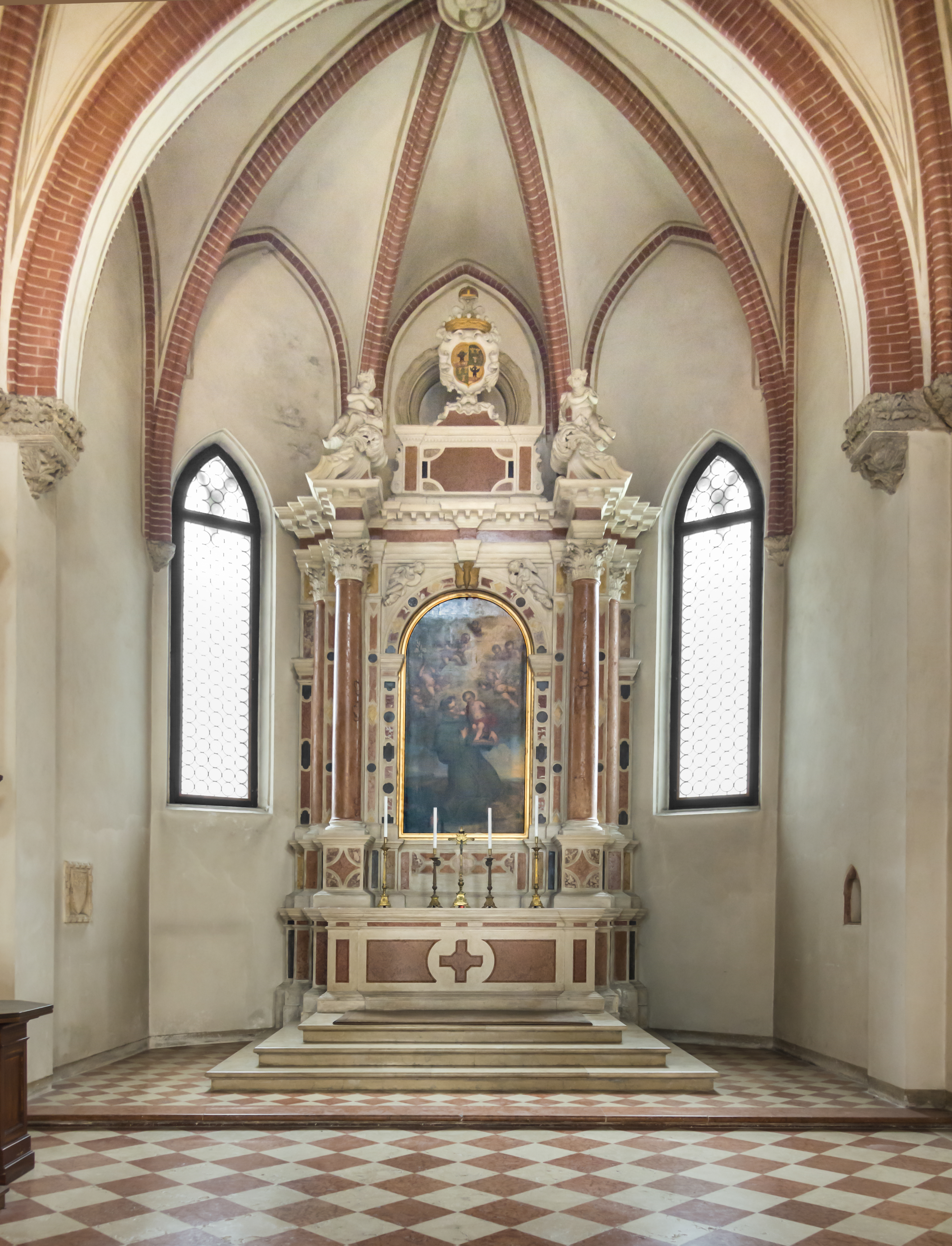
Third chapel on the left dedicated to the Loschi family

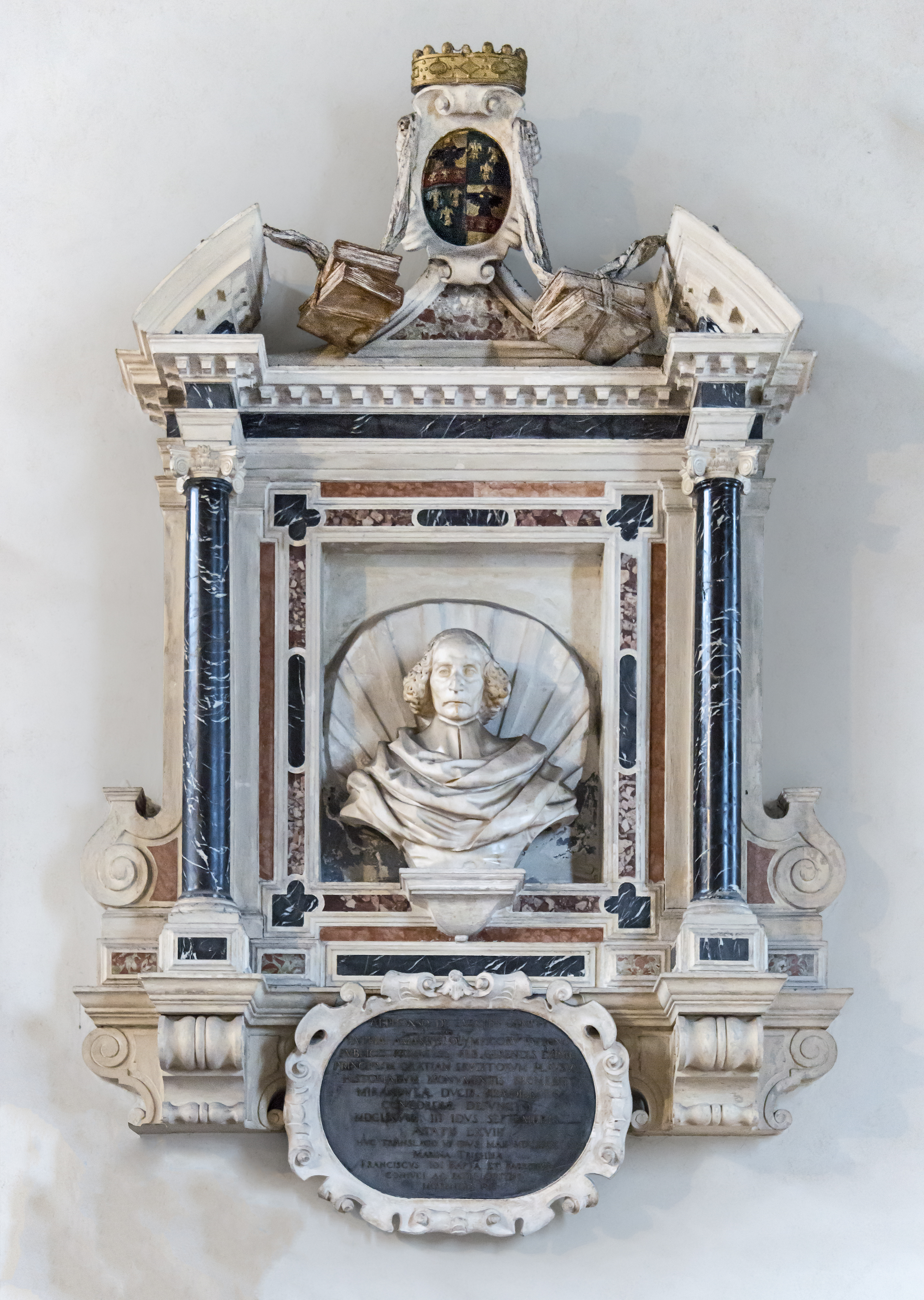
Monument to Alfonso Loschi

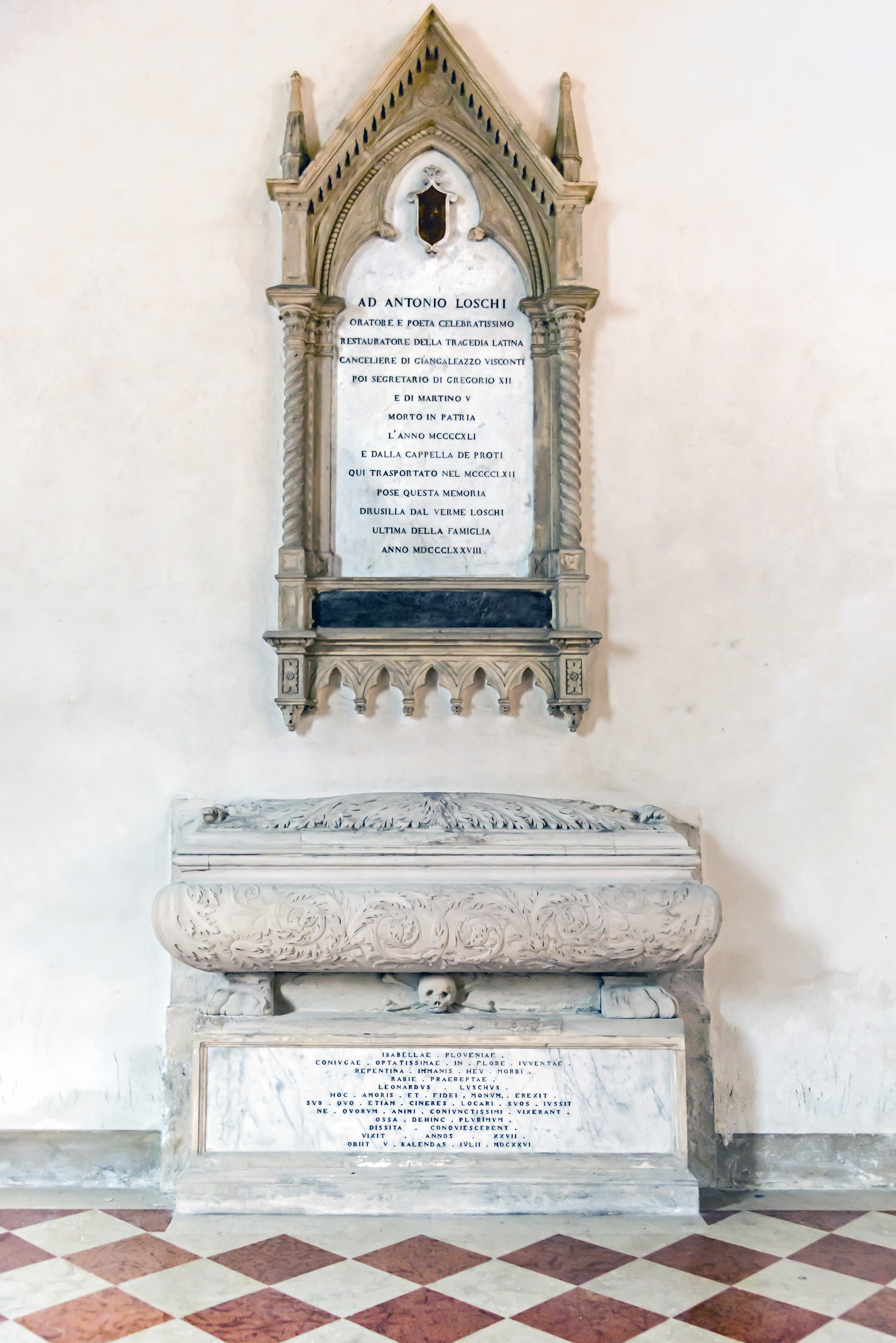
Monument to Antonio Loschi

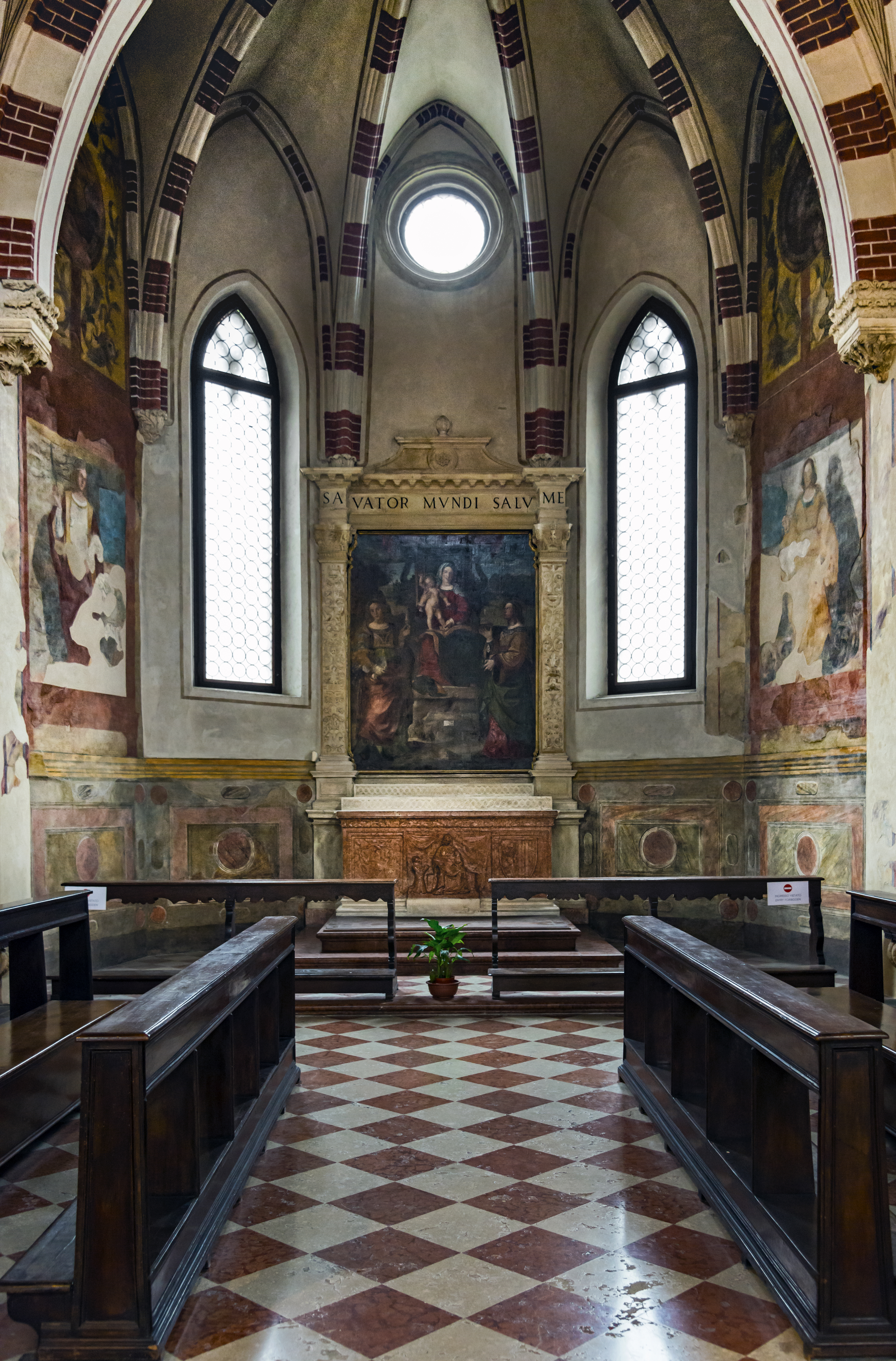
The fourth chapel on the left

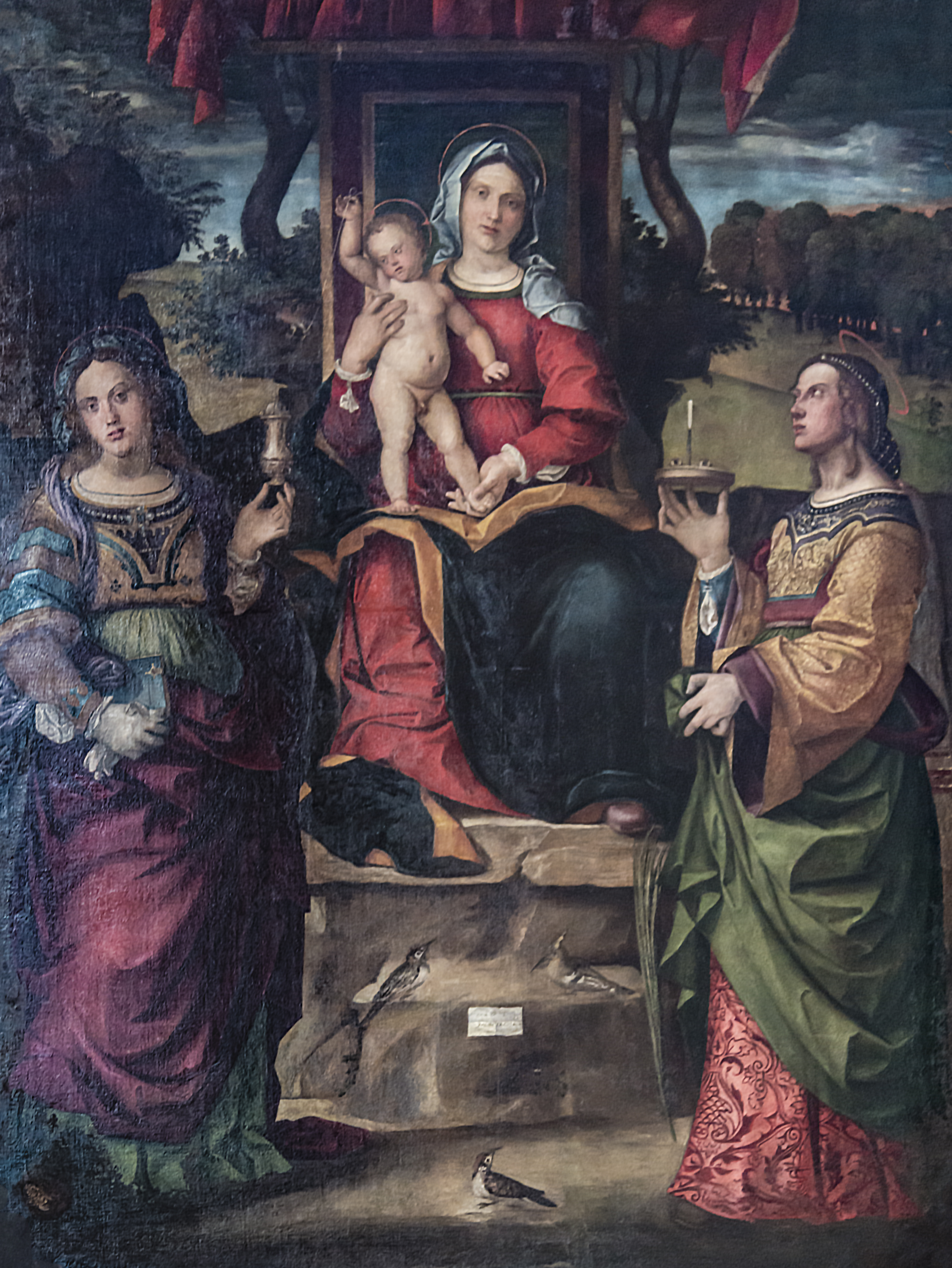
Madonna col bambino tra le Sante Maddalena e Lucia, by Bartolomeo Montagna

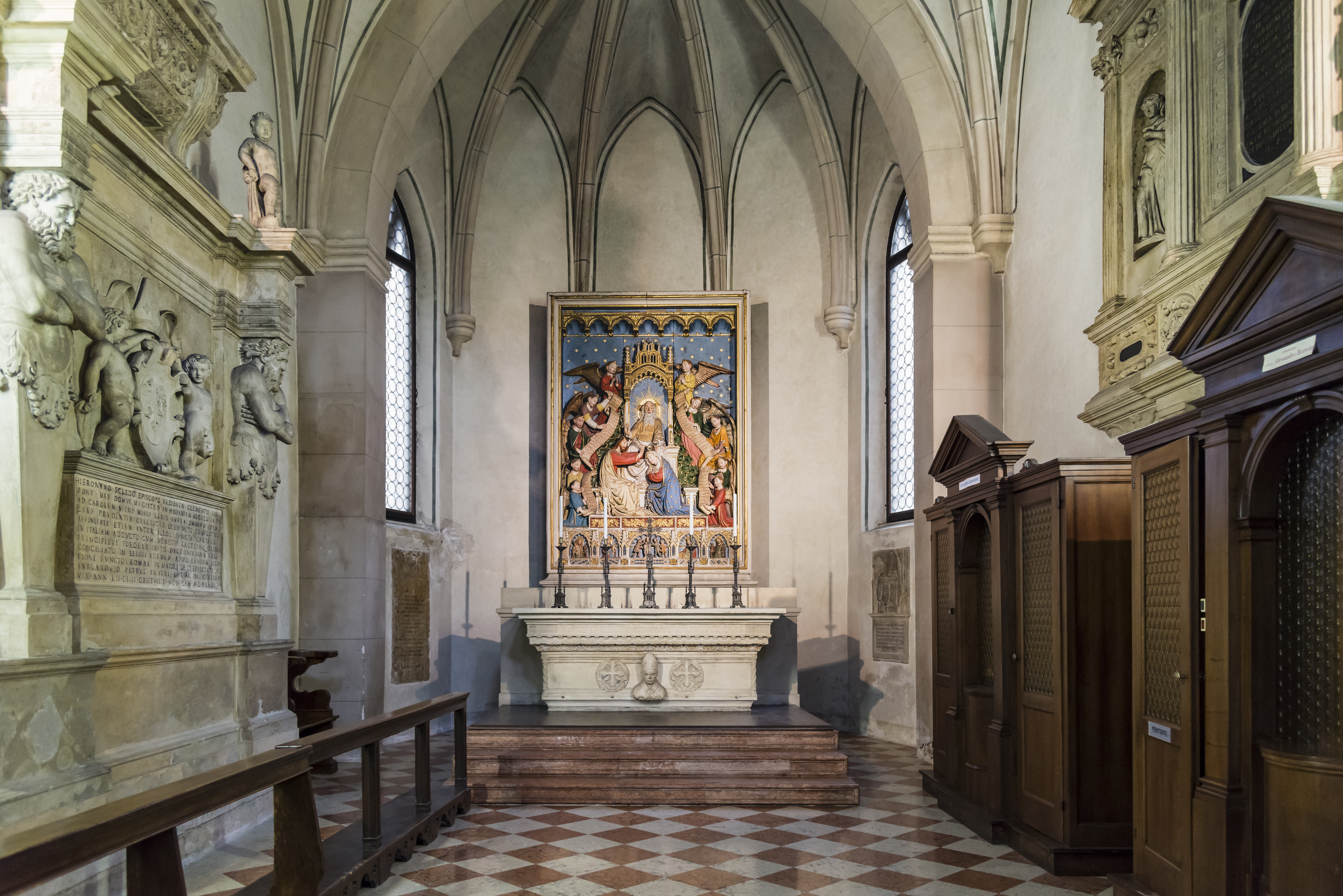
Chapel of the Incoronata

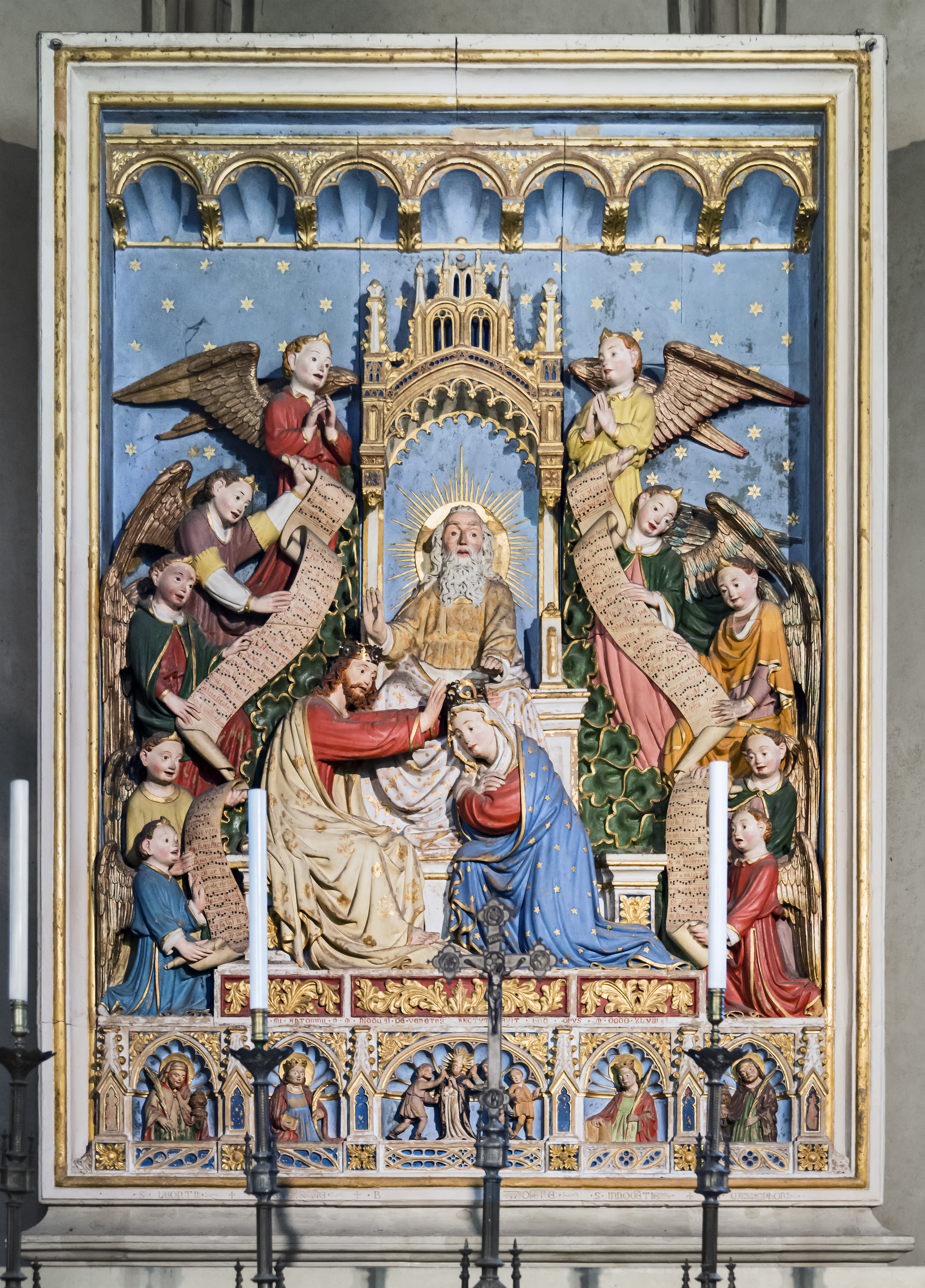
Coronation of the Virgin (1448) by Antonino di Niccolò da Venezia

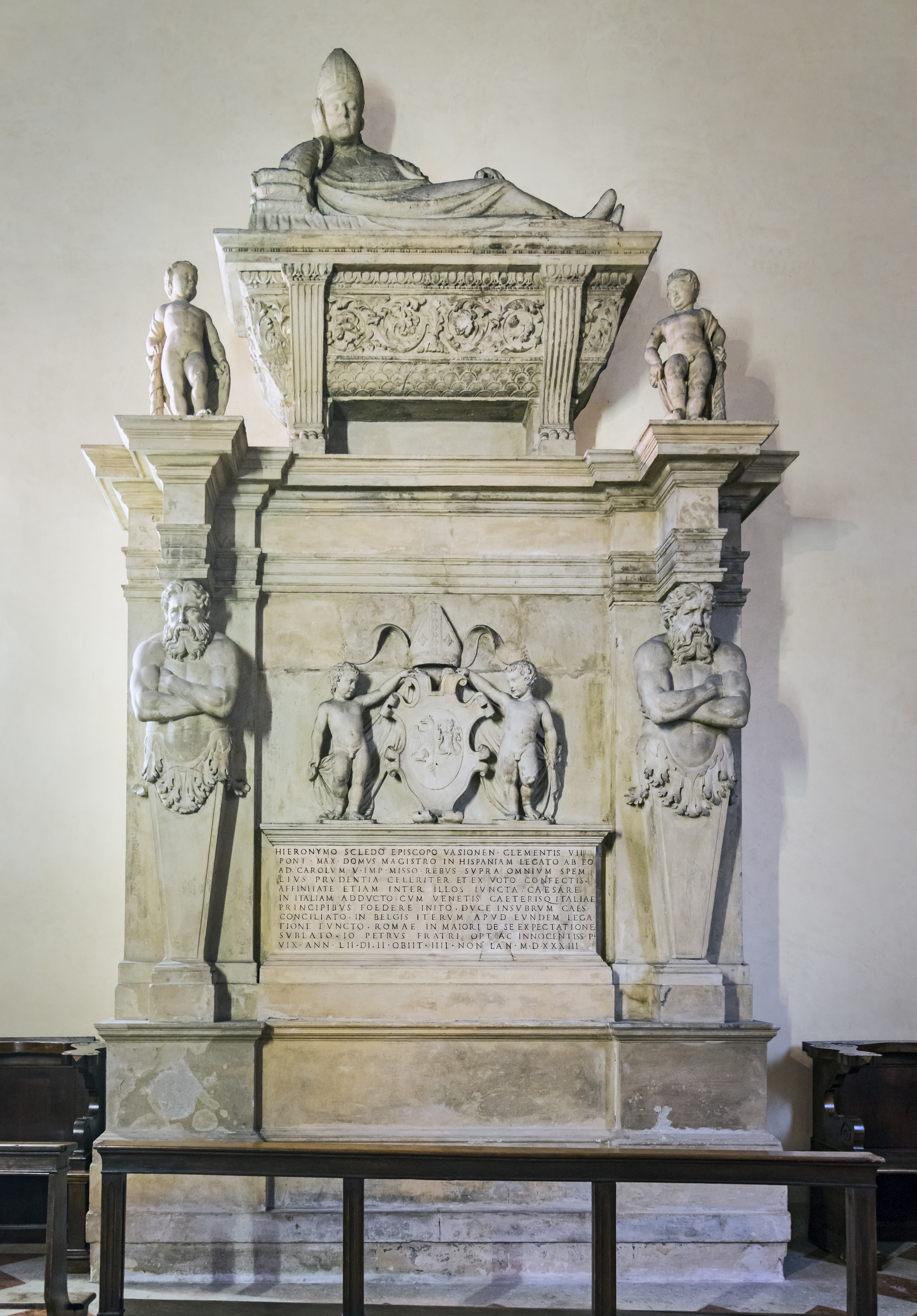
Funerary monument of Girolamo Bencucci

Right nave

- Chapel of the baptismal font - The present work dates from 1824. Work of the brothers Sguarise stone cutters on a drawing of the Antonian Bernati Bassanese. On the lid there is a small statue of Saint John the Baptist of Girolamo Albanese (XVII century).
- Chapel of St. James and St. Anthony the Great - Dormitio Virginis, polyptyque de Lorenzo Veneziano (1366). On the left wall the sarcophagus of Tommaso and Giampietro de Proti.
- Chapel of St. Jerome - The oldest one, founded in 1383 by Bishop Giovanni de Surdis, was then repeatedly remodeled, preserves today the two funerary monuments to Girolamo and Giovanni Battista Gualdo (16th c.) with the busts of the sarcophagus by Alessandro Vittoria.
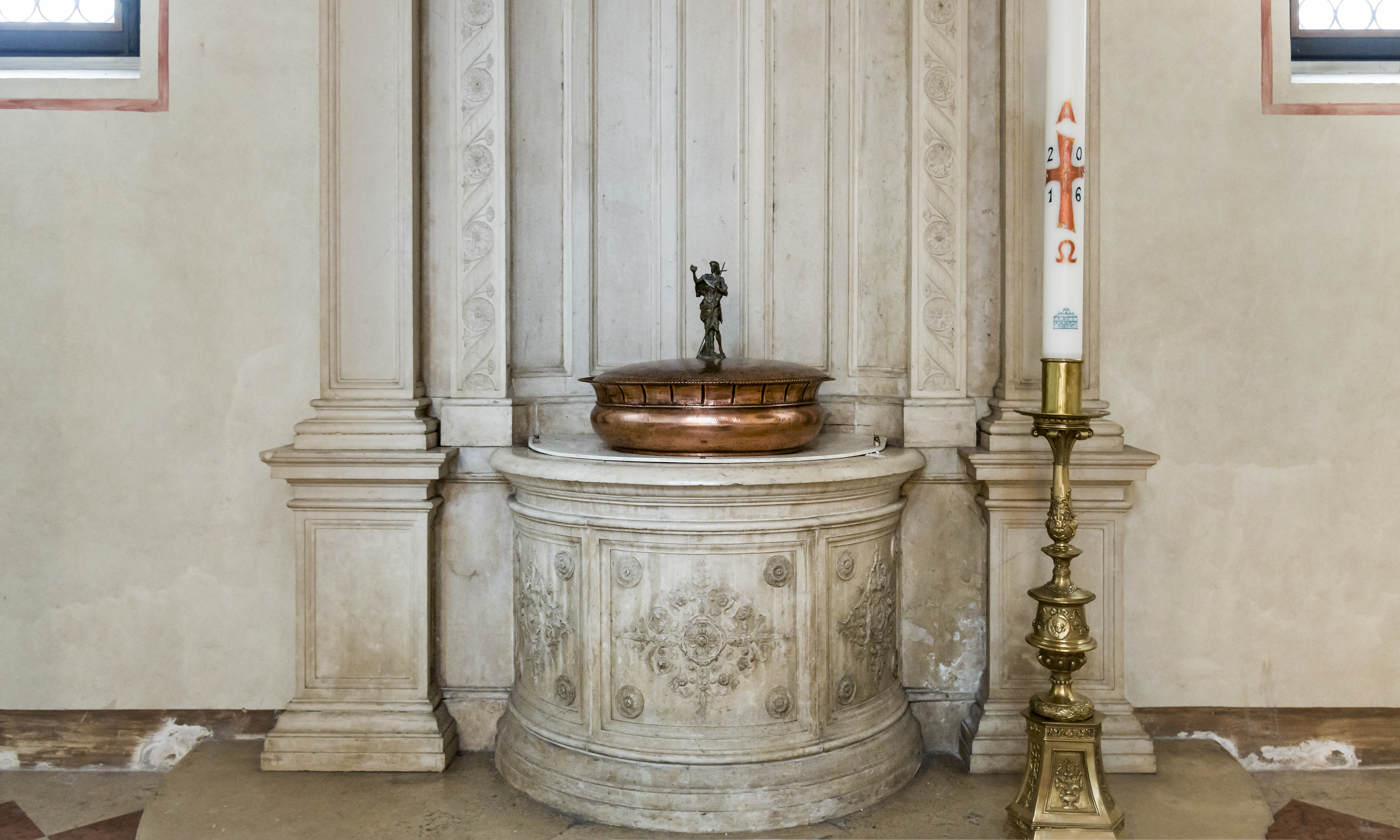
Chapel of the baptismal font

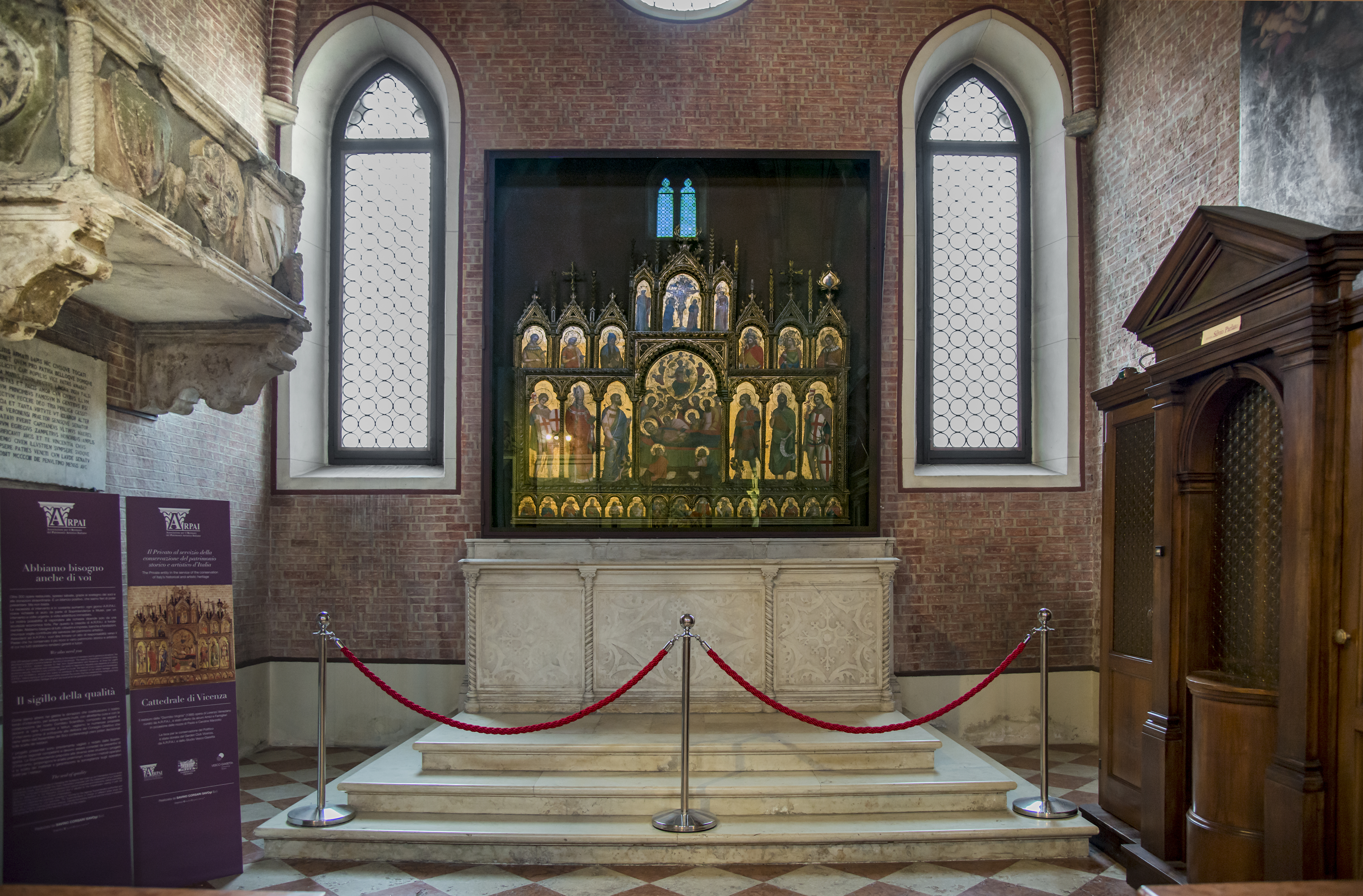
Chapel of St. James and St. Anthony the Great

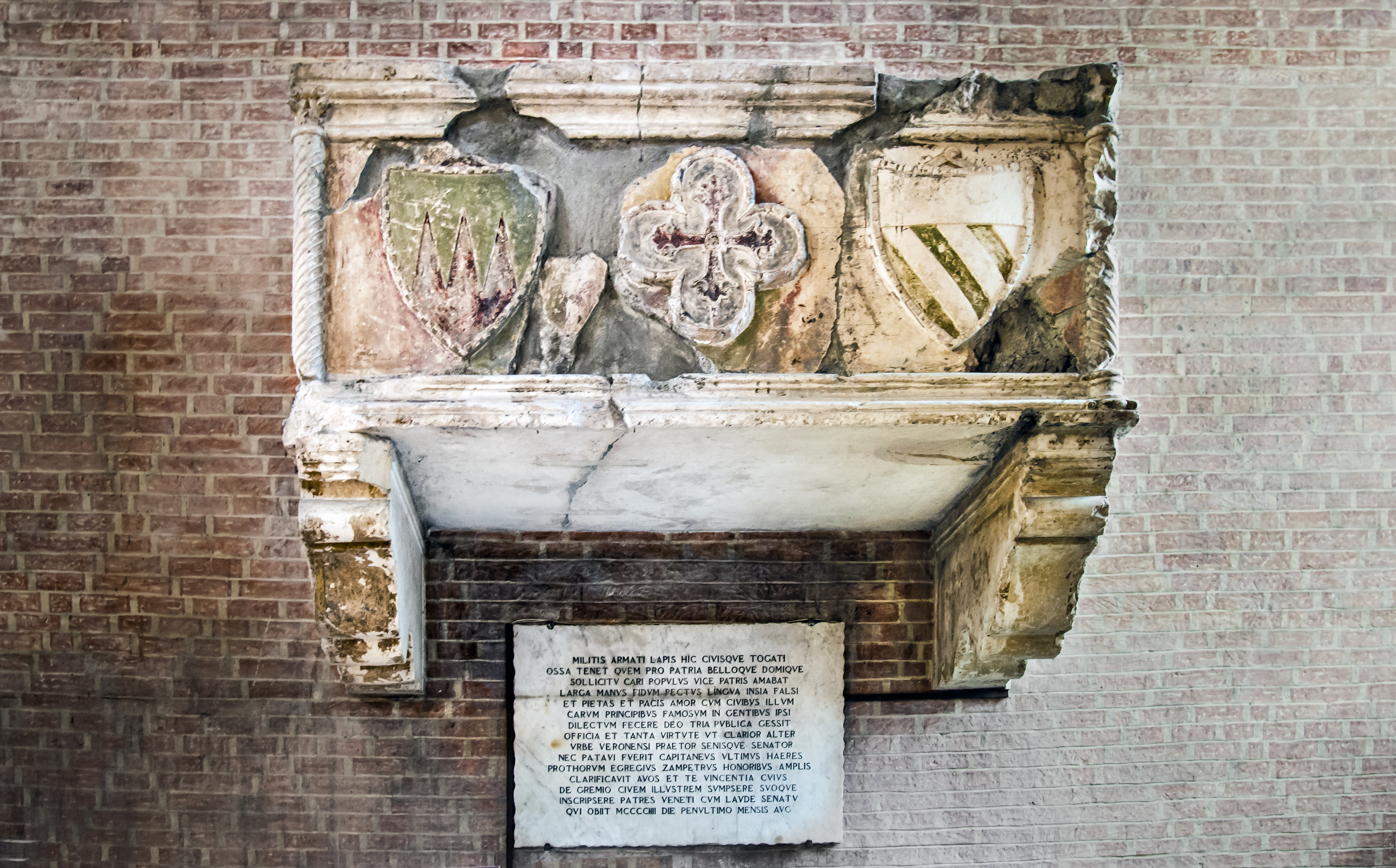
Sarcophagus of Tommaso and Giampietro de Proti.

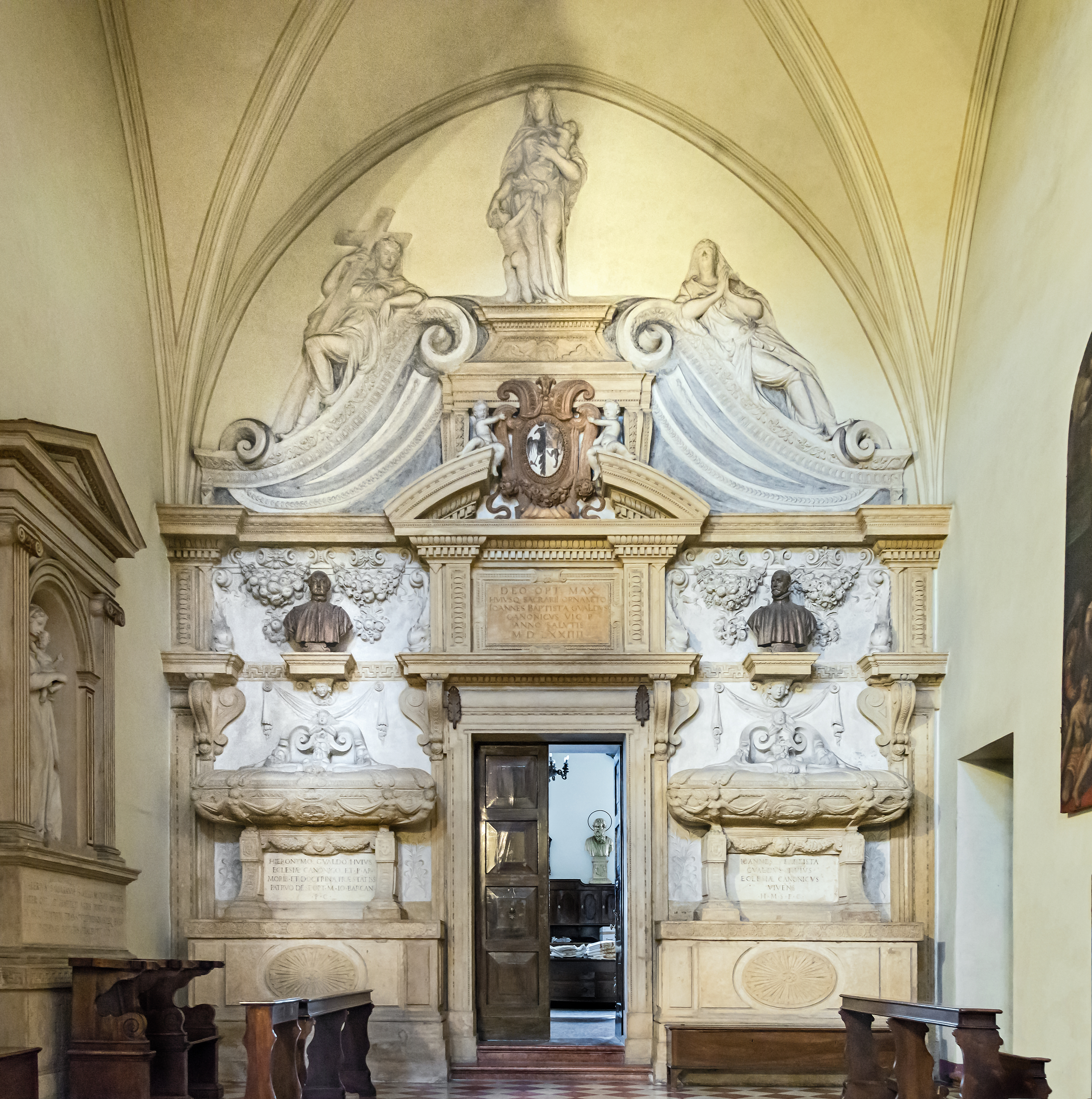
Chapel of St. Jerome

=== Organ ===
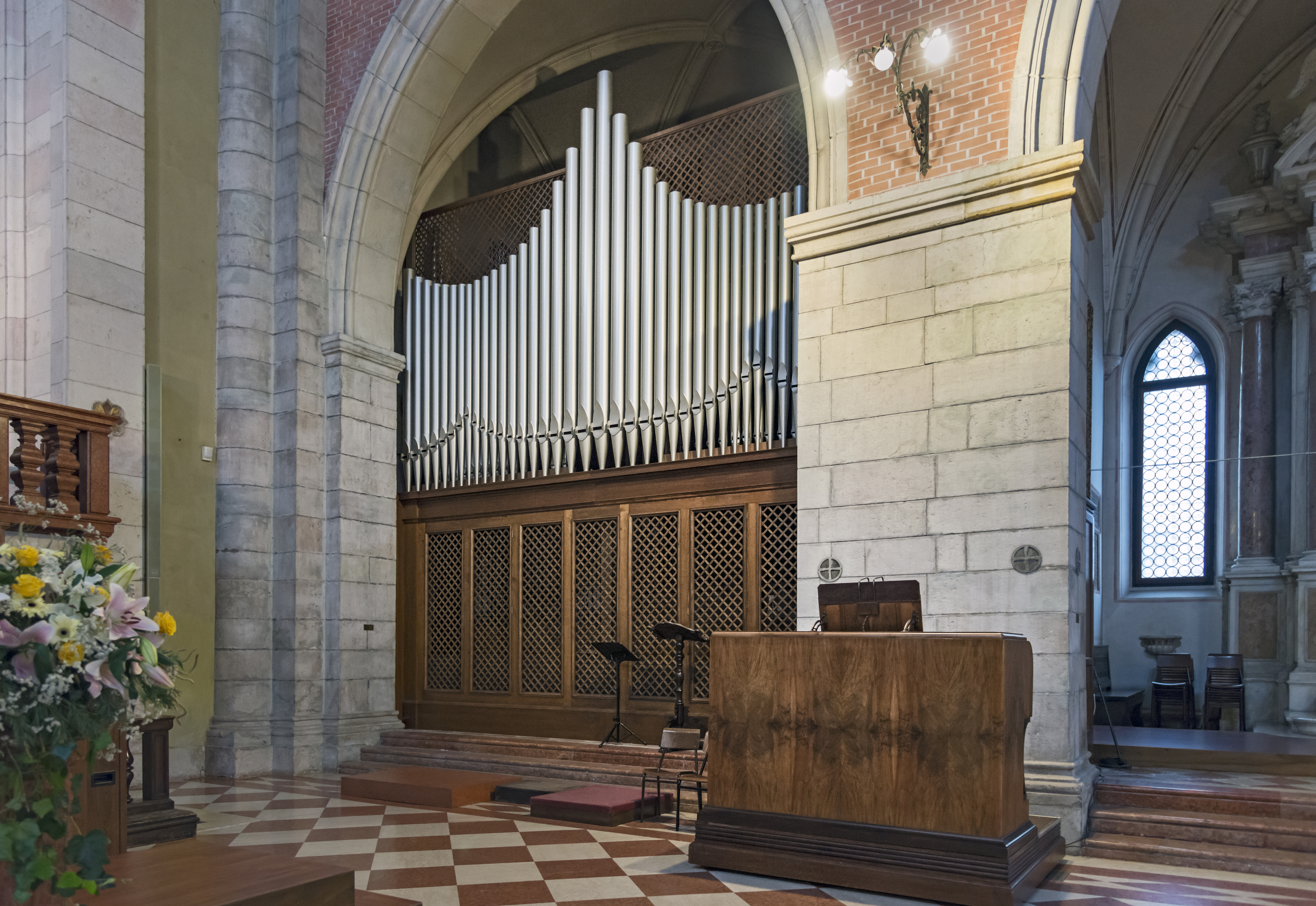
Organ Mascioni opus 721

In the last chapel on the right, there is the Mascioni opus 721 rod, built in 1955 and subsequently expanded. The instrument is electrically powered and its console, independent mobile, has three keyboards of 61 notes each and a concave-radial pedal of 32 notes.
