= Borgo San Pietro (Vicenza) =

District of Vicenza, Italy

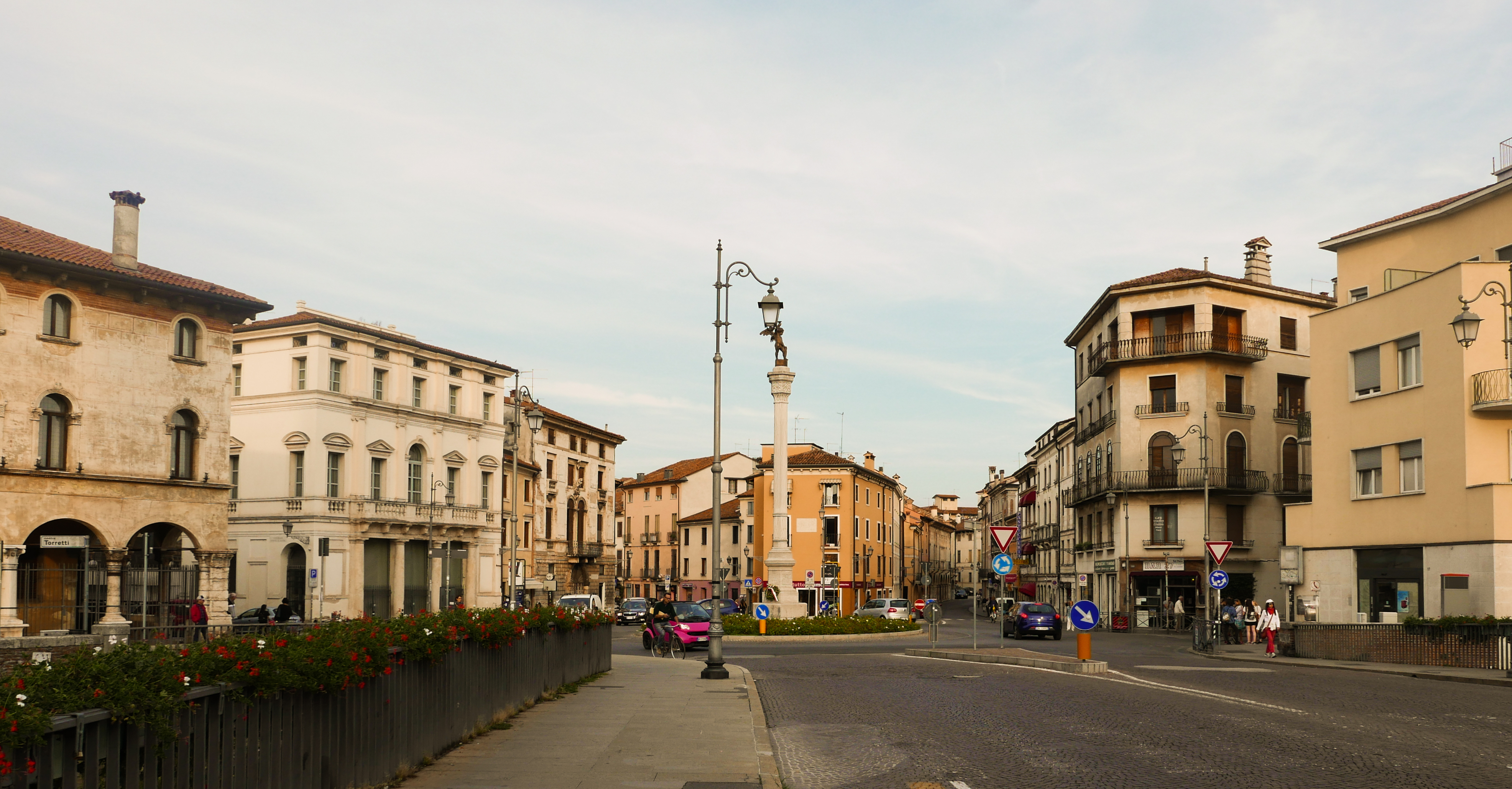
- Piazza XX Settembre, providing access to the borgo
- Country: Italy
- Region: Veneto
- Province: Vicenza
- City: Vicenza
- Circoscrizione: 1 Centro Storico
- Postal code: 36100
- Patron saint: Saint Peter, Saint Lucy

Borgo San Pietro (also known historically as the Trastevere District in the 19th and 20th centuries) is a historic district within the old town of Vicenza, Italy. Located east of the Bacchiglione River, it developed along ancient Roman roads extending from the city centre. The district occupies the area between the river and the 14th-century Scaliger fortifications.

== History ==
=== Origin of the names ===
The district has been known by several names throughout its history:

- Borgo: This term typically refers to a settlement that grew outside a city's walls. San Pietro fit this description until 1370, when the Scaliger family constructed a second set of walls enclosing the district. Subsequently, new borghi (such as Santa Lucia, Padova, and Casale) developed outside this new perimeter, and San Pietro became an integral neighbourhood within the city.
- San Pietro: This name became common in the Early Middle Ages due to the district's proximity to the Benedictine nuns' monastery, which was the most significant landmark in the area at the time.
- Trastevere: Adopted around 1891, this name coincided with the renaming of the main square from Piazza degli Angeli to Piazza XX Settembre (commemorating the Breach of Porta Pia on September 20, 1870). The name drew a parallel with Rome's Trastevere district, highlighting Borgo San Pietro's status as Vicenza's most populous and working-class neighbourhood.
- ''Republica de san Zulian'': Used colloquially in the early 20th century, this term reflected the district's perceived semi-autonomous character, particularly in relation to the support network for residents of the San Giuliano Hospice (later the Salvi Institute).

=== Ancient era ===
In 148 BCE, the Romans built the Via Postumia connecting Genoa to Aquileia. This major road passed through the settlement of Vicenza, then inhabited by the Veneti, who were Roman allies. To facilitate the route, the Romans constructed a stone bridge over the Astico River (where the Bacchiglione flows today). Originally built with three arches and oriented differently from the modern bridge, a fourth arch was added in 1570 based on a design by Palladio.

Beyond the bridge, another Roman road branched off from the main Via Postumia (which headed northeast), leading towards Padova. It is highly probable that residential clusters formed along these roads—later known as ''Contrà'' Santa Lucia and ''Contrà della Fontana Coperta''—even during Roman times, creating the nucleus of the future borgo.

=== Middle Ages ===
Around the 9th–10th centuries, a ring of early medieval walls was constructed around Vicenza's compact urban core. These walls included the San Pietro gate, which provided access to the areas across the river. This eastern district was known in older records as Porsampiero, as documented by the historian Silvestro Castellini. By this period, the borgo had taken shape and was organized into distinct contrade (neighbourhoods or streets), which are documented in Vicenza’s 1208 Building Decree.

==== The Borgo of San Vito and Contrada of Santa Lucia ====
Developing along the ancient Via Postumia route, the Borgo of San Vito emerged during this period. It was named after the Benedictine abbey of San Vito, built on the site now occupied by the Non-Catholic Cemetery. Situated outside the city walls, the abbey church possessed a baptismal font and served a large territory extending as far as the parish of Santa Maria in Bolzano Vicentino.

In 1206, the abbey was granted to Camaldolese monks. In 1314, they acquired a building closer to the city and replaced the original abbey church with an oratory dedicated to Saint Lucy. This relocation spurred further growth in the surrounding borgo. When the Scaliger walls were built in 1370, the wealthier and more densely populated inner section of this area was incorporated into the city proper. The outer section, remaining outside the new walls, became known as the Borgo of Santa Lucia. The inner part, now within the walls, retained the name ''Contrà de Santa Lùssia'' (Contrada of Santa Lucia).

==== The Contrada of San Pietro ====
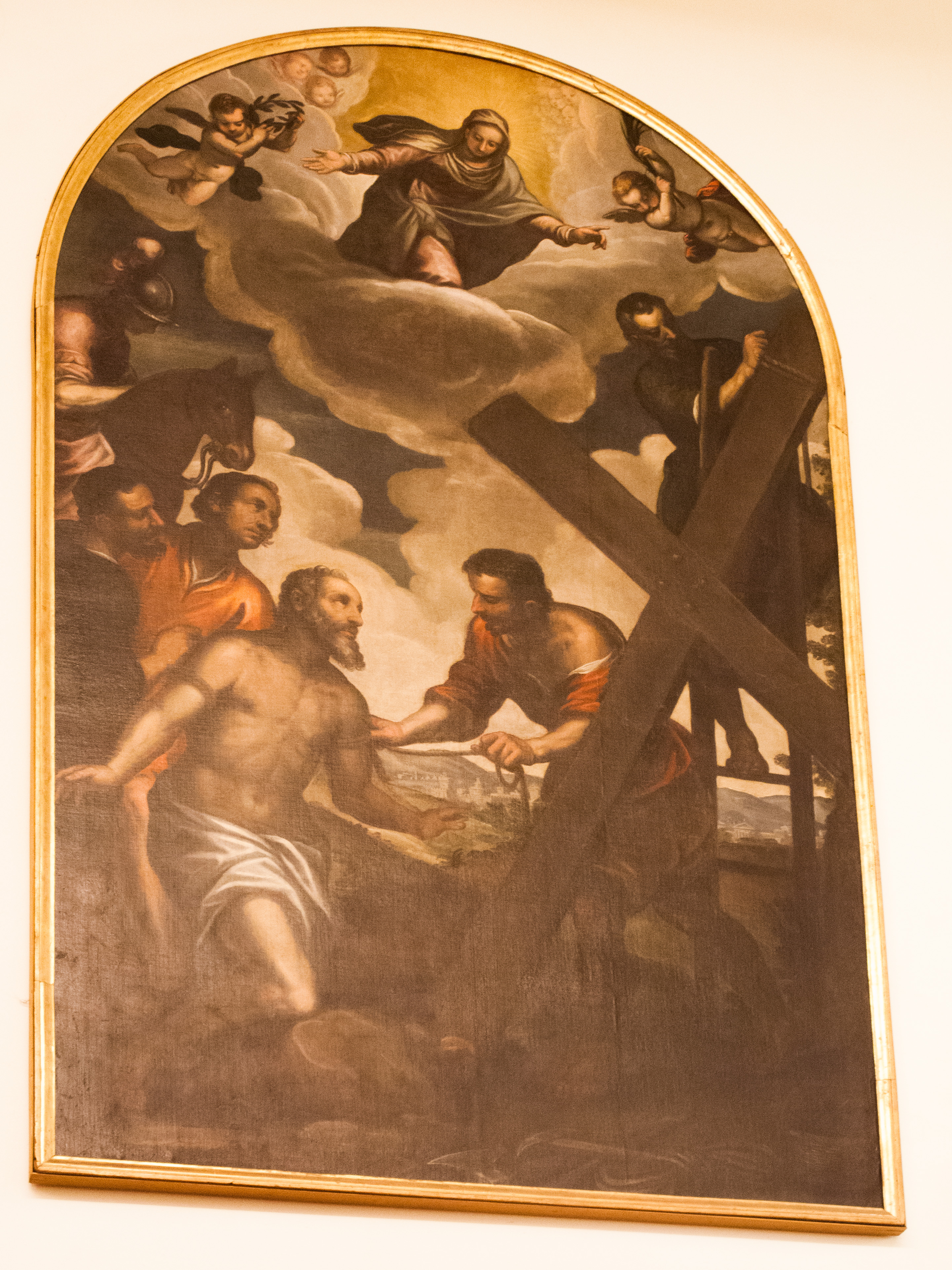
Altarpiece of the Martyrdom of Saint Andrew, attributed to Alessandro Maganza, formerly in the Church of Sant'Andrea

Before the 10th century, the Benedictine Monastery of San Pietro was established near the left bank of the Bacchiglione. Initially housing monks, it later became a convent for nuns. The monastery faced significant hardships during the Early Middle Ages, likely suffering damage during Hungarian raids in the early 10th century. A ''privilegium'' (charter) issued by Bishop Rodolfo in 977 described the monastery as “almost annihilated and devoid of monastic worship or divine service.” After 1000 CE, the bishops of Vicenza granted the nuns substantial feudal holdings around the monastery and throughout the Vicentine territory, bolstering its importance.

The monastery held jurisdiction over several smaller churches within Borgo San Pietro. These included San Vitale, located near the monastery square (where the Trento Institute was later built in the 19th century), and Sant'Andrea, situated near the Corte dei Roda. Documents from 1129 and 1166 record the abbess of San Pietro leasing land and houses near Sant'Andrea to local residents. From the 13th to the 15th centuries, Sant'Andrea functioned as a parish church, served by a secular priest appointed by the abbess, confirming the existence of a distinct ''contrada'' (neighbourhood) around it.

By the early 15th century, Sant'Andrea had fallen into disuse and was in a dilapidated state, partly due to frequent flooding from the Bacchiglione.

==== The Borgo of Porta Padova ====
This borgo developed along one of the two main roads leading east out of the city through the Porsampiero gate and certainly existed in the Early Middle Ages. In 1270, the Benedictine nuns of San Pietro leased land here for the establishment of a hospice “for the benefit of the poor,” known as ''Chà di Dio''. Its associated church, dedicated to Saint Julian the Hospitaller, is documented by 1319. The hospice provided shelter for beggars and pilgrims travelling the route between Vicenza and Padua.

During this period, the San Giuliano hospice was one of the most important charitable institutions in the city. Records show that in 1295, private citizens made donations to support its work in exchange for spiritual benefits. When the Scaliger walls were constructed in 1370, this area was left outside the new fortifications, and the hospice ceased operations by the mid-15th century.

However, services continued to be held in the Church of San Giuliano, which received furnishings and underwent restorations during this time. After the nuns relinquished control, the church became municipal property, administratively linked to the Church of San Vincenzo, and took on pastoral responsibilities for the surrounding area. It also became a traditional location for formal welcomes when new bishops—often Venetians in the 15th century—made their official entry into the Vicentine diocese.

This indicates that although the 1370 walls separated the inner ''contrada'' from the outer borgo, strong connections remained between them, facilitated by the Porta Padova gate, which under Venetian rule primarily functioned as a customs checkpoint rather than a strict defensive barrier.

==== The Borgo of the Roblandine (or San Domenico) ====
Evidence for the existence of this borgo in the 14th century comes from the 1377 will of Guglielmo Bolognini, which mentions it as one of the "''burgorum Sancti Petri Civitatis Vincentie''". The name refers to the settlement that grew around the convent of San Domenico, established circa 1264 by Dominican nuns. The convent complex, including the church and cloisters, underwent extensive rebuilding from the 15th century onwards. Today, these buildings house the Arrigo Pedrollo Conservatory of Music.

==== The Scaliger Walls ====
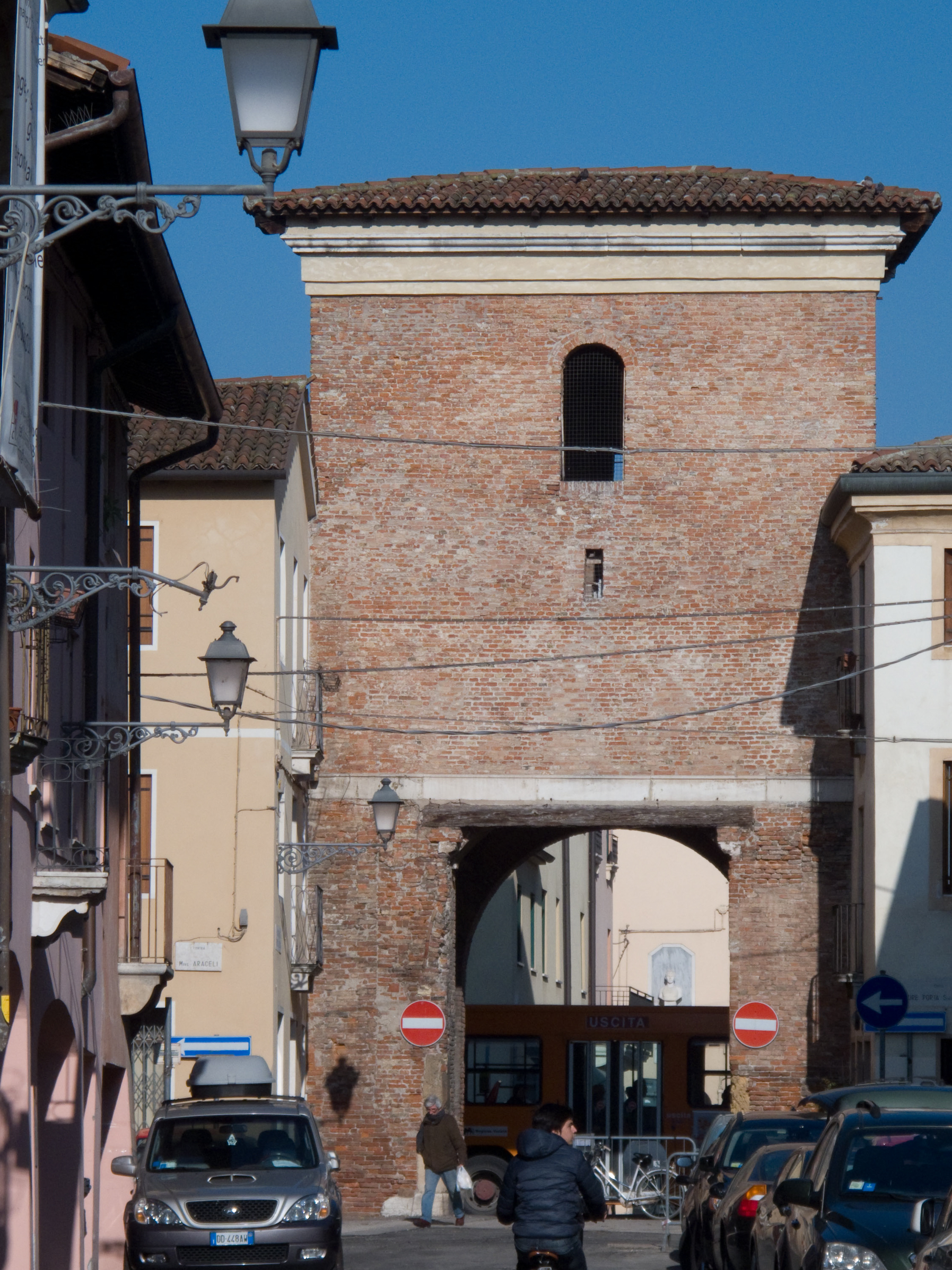
Porta Santa Lucia, viewed from the eponymous ''contrada''

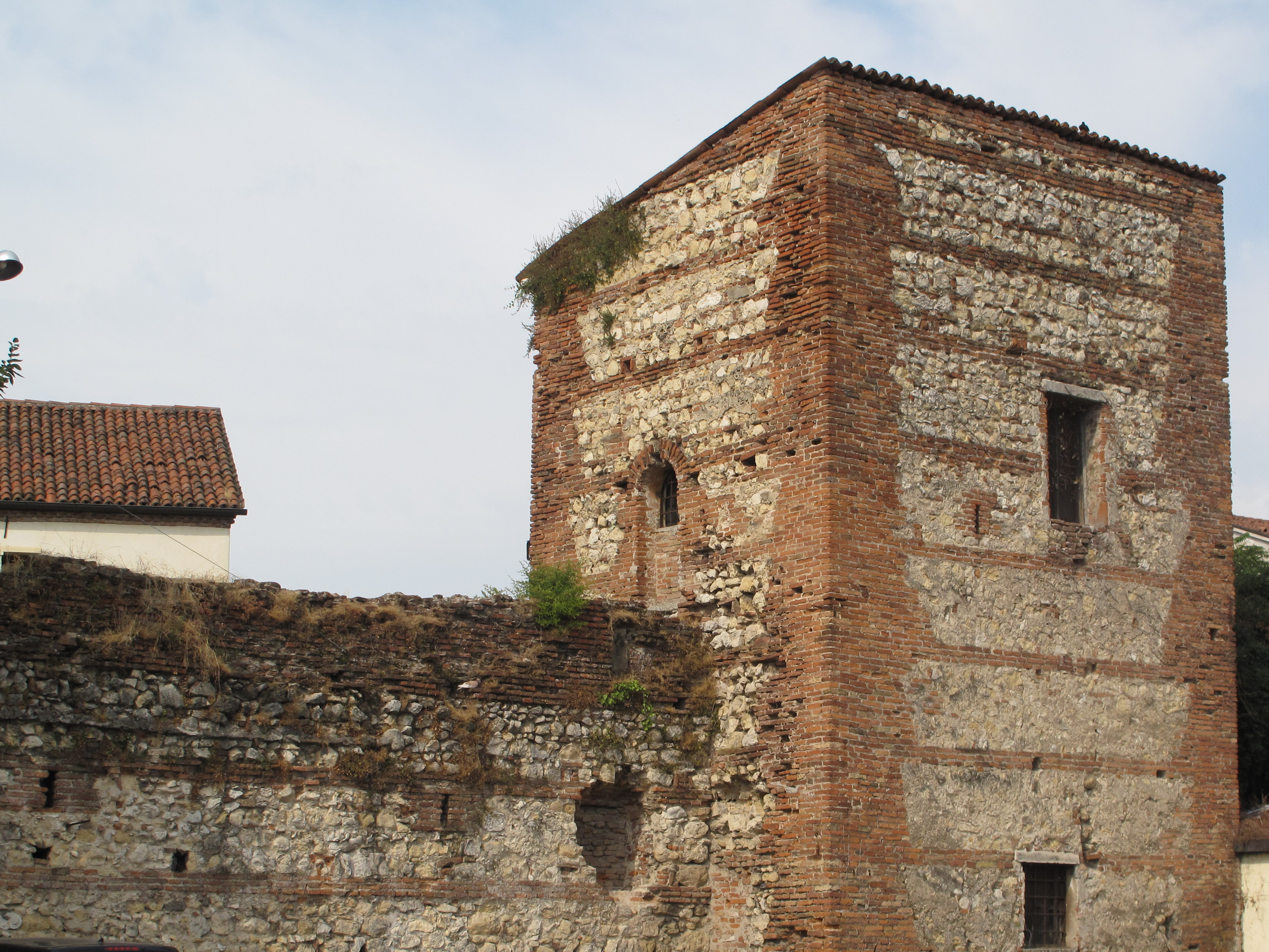
Scaliger walls along Via Legione Gallieno

During the 12th and 13th centuries, Vicenza experienced significant growth and prosperity. The eastern sector across the Bacchiglione, comprising several small borghi (identified by Castellini as San Vito, Lisiera, Roblandine, Camisano, and San Pietro), had become densely populated by the early 14th century. This expansion led to the formation of distinct contrade along the five main roads radiating from the bridge then known as Ponte degli Angeli (formerly Porsampiero).

According to Castellini, this collection of eastern borghi was protected by a defensive moat from at least 1182. Following their defeat by a Veneto-Florentine coalition in 1344, the Scaliger rulers reinforced these defences by adding ramparts—raised earthen embankments. Access was restricted to five gates (or controlled openings), likely guarded by wooden watchtowers known as ''battifredi''. These gates, listed counterclockwise starting from the north, were: San Vito (or Santa Lucia), leading towards the San Vito area; Lisiera; Roblandine, at the end of modern-day Contrà San Domenico; Camisano (also known as Torricelle or Porta Padova), facing Padova; and Camarzo, located near the San Pietro Monastery.

Around 1370, facing increasing tensions between the Republic of Venice and Francesco I da Carrara, Lord of Padua, Cansignorio della Scala decided to further strengthen Vicenza's defences to prevent the kind of devastation experienced during earlier conflicts with Padua. He ordered the construction of stone walls to enclose the entire Borgo San Pietro area, which had previously relied only on the moat and rampart. The number of gates was reduced to three—Santa Lucia, Padova, and Camarzo—while the Roblandine and Lisiera gates were sealed. Castellini noted this change: “Instead of one gate at the Ponte degli Angeli, he made three…” Two centuries later, in 1560, the nuns of San Pietro obtained permission to permanently close the Camarzo gate.

The new wall began on the left bank of the Bacchiglione, a short distance from the Ponte degli Angeli. It followed the outer edge of what became Contrà Torretti (named after the small towers, ''torrette'', likely incorporated into the wall) and Contrà Mure Araceli, where the Santa Lucia gate was situated. The wall continued along the present-day streets of Mure Santa Lucia, Mure San Domenico, and Mure Porta Padova. The Porta Padova gate stood where Contrà Porta Padova (now truncated) met Mure Porta Padova; modest remains of the gate structure are still visible near the intersection with Viale Margherita. The wall line, much of which is still traceable, continued towards Contrà San Pietro, eventually rejoining the Bacchiglione River (which at that time flowed further east, roughly parallel to today's Via Nazario Sauro) near the former location of the Camarzo gate. The total length of this eastern wall circuit was approximately 1,220 meters.

=== Early modern period ===
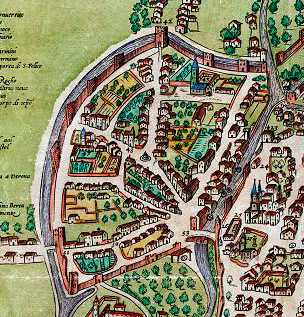
Detail of Vicenza amplissima, drawn in 1588, featuring Borgo San Pietro.

By the 16th century, records indicate that the walled area of Borgo San Pietro was already more densely populated and considered more prominent than some other parts of Vicenza. Throughout the early modern period (16th–18th centuries), the population residing within the district's parishes (Santa Lucia and San Pietro, including some dependent rural areas) consistently accounted for nearly a quarter of the entire city's inhabitants.

During the period of Venetian rule, the borgo maintained a presence of noble families, such as the Thiene and Monza, alongside merchants and bourgeois homeowners of considerable means. Starting in the 15th century, wealthier families commissioned impressive residences, including the Gothic Palazzo Regaù, the Renaissance Palazzo Angaran, the 16th-century Thiene houses, and the late 18th-century Palazzo Belisario.

Despite these examples of affluence, the borgo remained predominantly a working-class district. Its contrade were characterized by artisan workshops, mills, and various trades, many of which persisted until the cusp of the industrial era. Common occupations included shopkeepers, shoemakers, masons, leatherworkers, tailors, and weavers, reflecting the industrious nature of the local population.

Contrà Sant'Andrea, in particular, hosted numerous leatherworkers, some quite prosperous, like Gaspare Manente, who owned a complex comprising a “water-powered spinning and twisting mill with a wheel… a leather fulling mill, a sawmill, and three mill wheels.” While silk production was limited in the district until the 18th century, dyers, wool workers, and weavers were common throughout its neighbourhoods. Many homes also featured gardens and courtyards.

By the 18th century, however, the working-class quarters of Santa Lucia and San Pietro had become some of the most degraded and impoverished areas in Vicenza. This situation was exacerbated as less desirable populations were often pushed from wealthier central areas towards the city's fringes. The urban elite tended to minimize contact with these groups, particularly those engaged in trades like tanning and butchery, as well as with recently urbanized peasants and beggars. Furthermore, the Borgo Padova area housed the barracks of the ''sbirri'' (the Venetian Republic's police guards), who were generally unpopular with the populace.

In the pre-industrial late 18th century, increasing overcrowding further diminished the quality of life in the contrade. Cobblestone streets often deteriorated into mud during rain or frequent floods, and housing generally lacked proper sanitation and comfort. Goethe, visiting Vicenza during this period, admired the locals for their “open and affable manners,” which he attributed to their “constant outdoor life,” perhaps a necessity given the indoor conditions.

Towards the end of the 18th century, silk production gained a foothold in the district, particularly near the workshops of Borgo Pusterla. Looms operated continuously, and ''samitari'' (weavers of ''samit'', a luxurious silk fabric often interwoven with gold or silver threads) and their families became more concentrated here than in other parts of the city. Nevertheless, industrial-scale silk processing remained limited, with only one silk mill (equipped with 24 stoves) located at Fontanelle, alongside a single workshop belonging to the Felice Savi company.

=== Contemporary era ===
==== Decline and degradation of the district ====
Following the fall of the Venetian Republic in 1797 and the subsequent disruptions caused by Napoleonic campaigns, Vicenza's economy entered a period of gradual decline. This was largely driven by the stagnation and eventual collapse of the silk industry, a cornerstone of the city's traditional economy and social structure. While some other areas adapted, Vicenza suffered severely, particularly after the introduction of the mechanical loom. Local silk entrepreneurs struggled to compete in the changing global marketplace, leading to widespread business failure and job losses. This economic hardship, which persisted through much of the 19th century, disproportionately affected working-class districts like San Felice and Borgo San Pietro.

Recurring cholera epidemics in 1836, 1849, 1855, and 1867 particularly ravaged these poorer neighbourhoods. Substandard, overcrowded housing conditions amplified the spread of disease and resulted in higher mortality rates, especially noted in Contrà San Pietro and the Corte dei Roda.

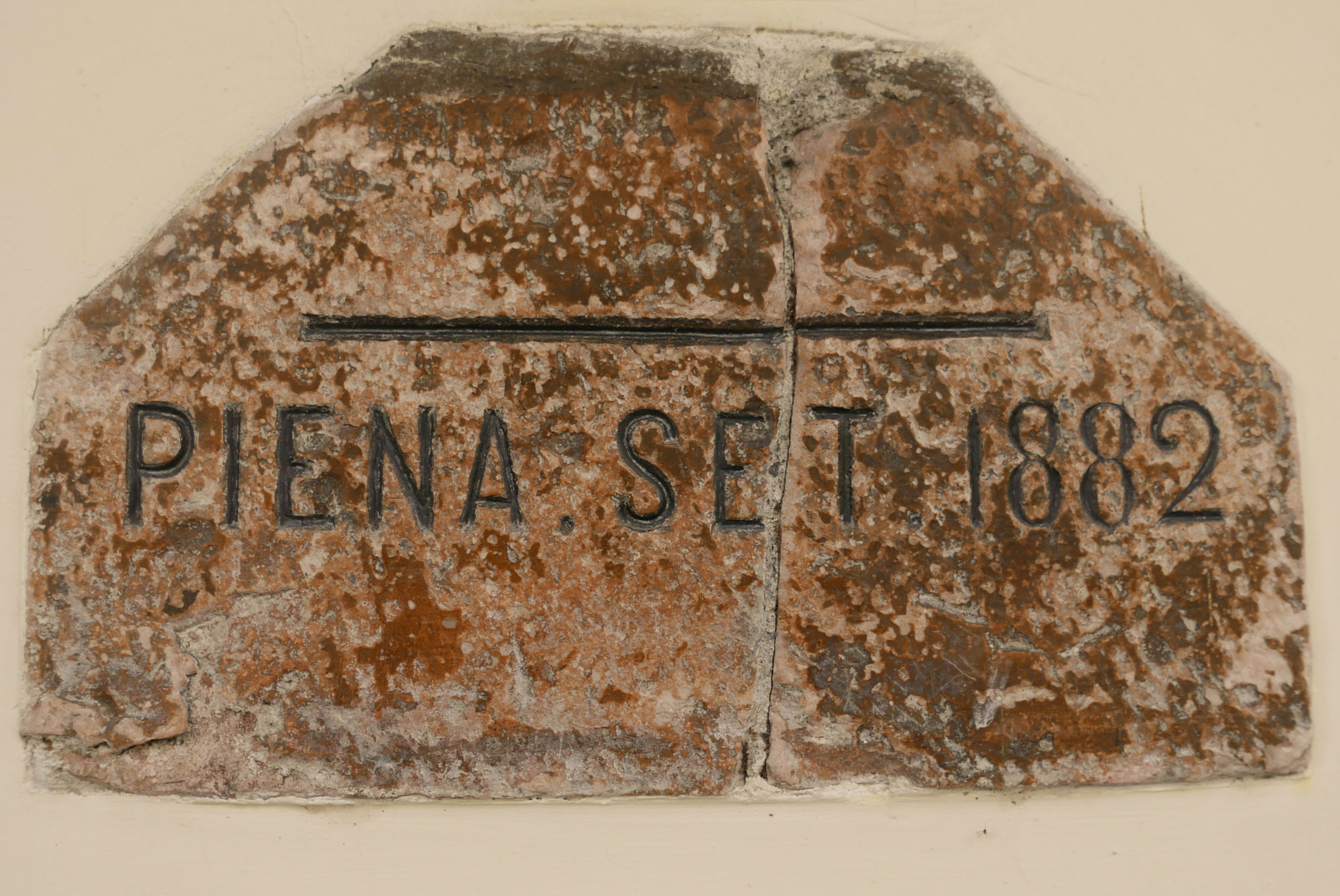
Plaque marking the 1882 flood level, approximately 180 cm high

Frequent flooding of the Bacchiglione River also devastated the low-lying areas of the district, such as Contrà Torretti, Santa Lucia, and Corte dei Roda. The major flood of 1882 was particularly catastrophic, exacerbating the physical decay of the area. Paradoxically, these shared hardships also fostered a growing sense of solidarity and community cohesion among the residents of the contrade.

Even after the Veneto region was annexed to the Kingdom of Italy in 1866, the district's decline continued. Local newspapers frequently decried the neglect shown by the municipal authorities towards all the contrade within Borgo San Pietro—including San Pietro itself with the Corte dei Roda, Porta Padova, and Santa Lucia.

In the late 19th century, the district's population gradually increased. This growth was fueled not only by a higher birth rate but significantly by migration from the surrounding countryside into the city. Workers seeking employment and impoverished individuals, sometimes encouraged to relocate by other provincial towns aiming to reduce their own welfare costs, contributed to the swelling population of Vicenza's poorer neighbourhoods.

==== Emergence of welfare and religious institutions ====
During the 19th century, the character of Borgo San Pietro shifted significantly with the establishment and concentration of numerous civic and religious welfare institutions. This transformed the district from primarily a residential area for modestly prosperous workers into a central hub for managing the city's poor, elderly, orphaned, and marginalized populations.

==== The Ottavio Trento Institute ====
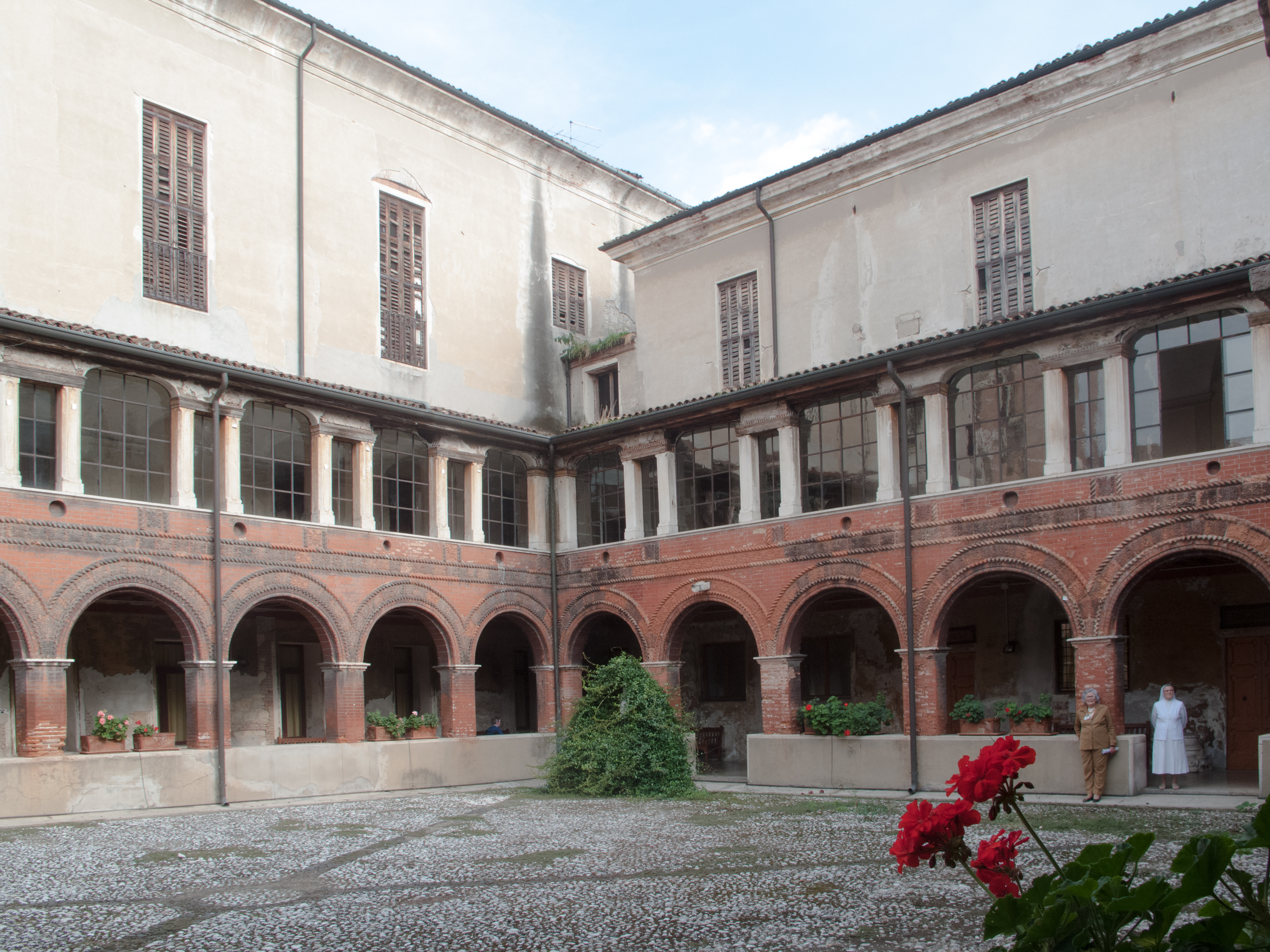
Cloister of the former San Pietro Monastery, site of the Trento Institute since the 19th century

In 1810, the Vicentine nobleman Ottavio Trento donated a substantial sum to the municipality to create a “voluntary and semi-forced workhouse.” This initiative aimed to provide relief for artisans and labourers who had become destitute with their families during the ongoing economic crisis. A significant bequest in his will further funded the project. The city designated the suppressed former Monastery of San Pietro as the site for this institution. Restoration work began after Trento's death and was completed in 1814.

Initially, the institute primarily housed elderly and needy individuals, offering basic shelter, especially during winter. Five years later, a section was opened dedicated to the children of unemployed workers, providing them with vocational training. In 1881, this children's section was relocated to the newly established municipal male orphanage, housed in the nearby former convent of San Domenico. The Ottavio Trento Institute—variously known as the “House of Industry and Labour to help the needy” and later the “Rest home for disabled or elderly persons without resources”—increasingly specialized in providing care for impoverished seniors, eventually evolving into a modern elder care facility.

==== The Salvi Institute ====
Count Gerolamo Salvi, who like Trento was childless, bequeathed almost his entire fortune to charitable causes aimed at supporting vulnerable populations. His 1873 will designated the municipality of Vicenza as his heir, with the explicit mandate to establish a shelter for the poor, the elderly, and individuals with physical or mental impairments. This led to the opening of a beggar's shelter (''Ricovero di Mendicità'') in the renovated former convent of San Giuliano in 1886.

==== The Public Dormitory ====
Palazzo Regaù, after passing through various owners, was converted into a public dormitory in 1888. It subsequently fell into disrepair but has undergone meticulous restoration in recent times, returning it to its former state.

==== The San Domenico Orphanage ====
By the mid-19th century, severe overcrowding at the Misericordia Orphanage necessitated finding separate premises for its boys' section. In 1861, the boys were moved to Contrà San Domenico, initially housed in the former Capuchin convent under the supervision of the Pavonian Fathers. Finding these facilities inadequate, they were relocated four years later to the adjacent, larger former Dominican convent. Workshops and classrooms were established to provide education and vocational training for “orphans or abandoned youths unable to be adequately supported by their families,” who resided there as boarders under the care of diocesan priests.

==== The Farina Institute ====
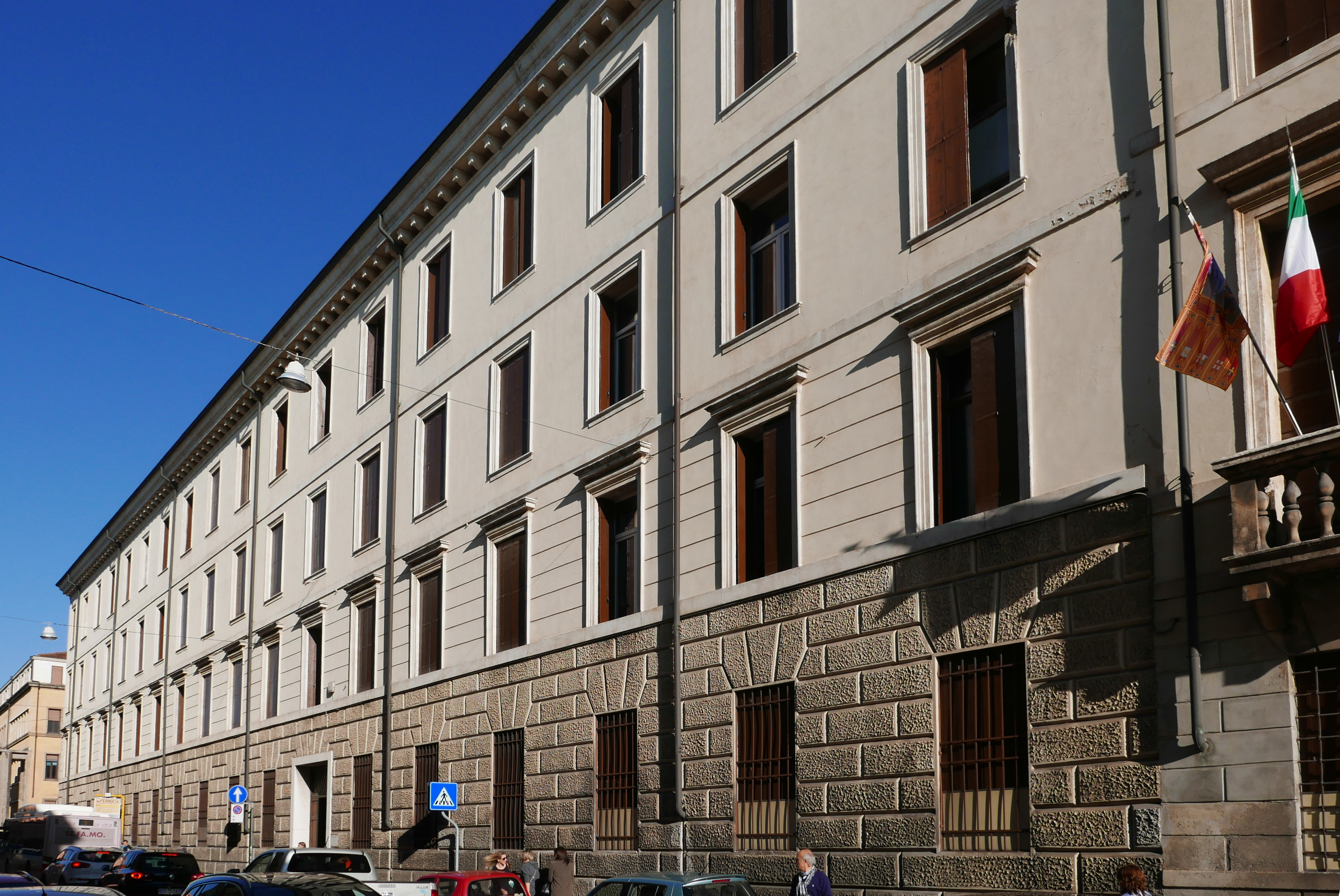
Farina Institute of the Sisters Teachers of Saint Dorothy, Daughters of the Sacred Hearts

Founded in 1836 by Giovanni Antonio Farina—a priest who later became Bishop of Treviso and then Vicenza—the Farina Institute originated from initiatives started during his early priesthood as chaplain of San Pietro parish. In 1827, Father Luca Passi introduced the ''Work of Saint Dorothy'', a lay association focused on religious education for girls, into the largely working-class parish. The following year, a ''Charity School for Poor Girls'' was established. Farina actively supported both initiatives and formally merged them in 1831. Initially run by secular teachers, Farina sought greater stability and commitment, leading him to establish a religious congregation, the Sisters of St. Dorothy, Daughters of the Sacred Hearts, in 1836 to run the school.

With approval from Bishop Cappellari and civic authorities, Farina opened the institute's first house in Contrà San Domenico. Supported by donations, it provided girls with not only humanistic and moral education but also vocational training, which was uncommon for women, especially from poorer backgrounds, at the time. By 1840, the institute had expanded its mission to include the education of blind and deaf-mute girls, employing specialized teaching methods.

==== The Childhood Asylum ====
Father Giuseppe Fogazzaro, a priest, patriot, and seminary professor, established Vicenza's first charitable nursery school, or "Asylum for Children." In 1839, his organizing committee announced plans, modeled on similar institutions in other cities and following the pedagogical principles of Ferrante Aporti, to provide care along with moral and intellectual education for young children, thereby easing the burden on poor families. The asylum opened in July 1839 in Piazza dell’Isola, initially catering to about 40 children from the city’s poorest families, many residing across the Bacchiglione in Borgo San Pietro. Its rapid growth soon necessitated assistance from the Dorothean nuns to manage the increasing number of girls attending.

==== The women’s oratory in Contrà Santa Lucia ====
Following Italian unification, numerous Catholic oratories were established in Vicenza as part of a broader movement to preserve religious values in response to the rise of secular, liberal, and sometimes anti-clerical or Masonic influences in society. These oratories offered young people religious and moral instruction, alongside recreational activities like reading, games, outings, theatre, music, and sports. Many also provided practical support such as after-school tutoring, vocational courses for girls (''scuole di lavoro''), and assistance with finding apprenticeships. The first such institution in Borgo San Pietro was a women's oratory opened in Contrà Santa Lucia, run by the Sisters of the Poor.

==== May 20, 1848, at Porta Santa Lucia ====
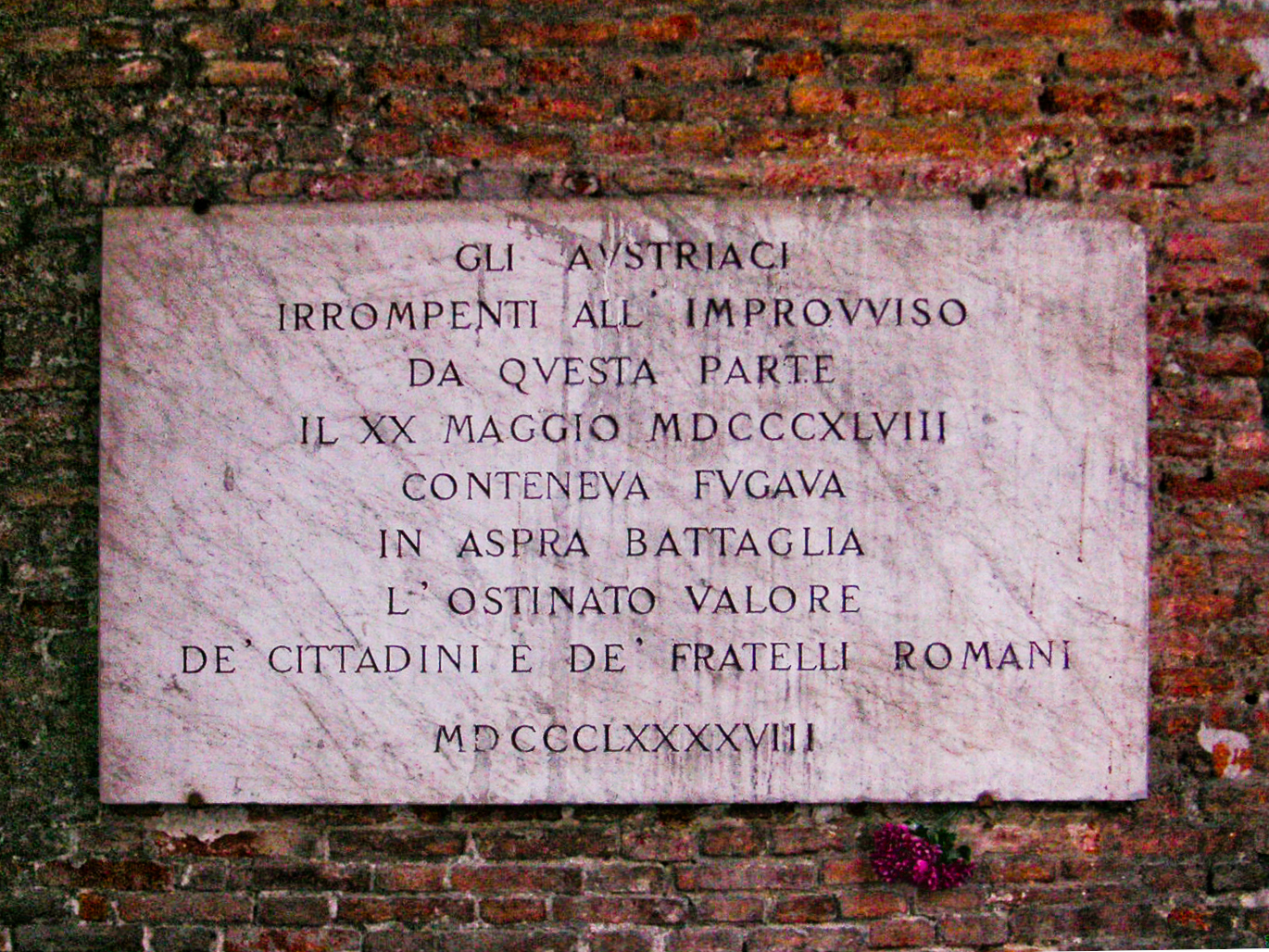
Plaque under Porta Santa Lucia commemorating the 1848 resistance

The Revolutions of 1848 swept across Europe, forcing the Austrian army in Northern Italy to retreat into the Quadrilatero fortresses. Vicenza was evacuated by Austrian forces on March 24, and a provisional government was formed. On May 20, an Austrian counteroffensive led by General Nugent, commanding around 16,000 troops supported by artillery, attacked the city's eastern defences between Porta Santa Lucia and Borgo Casale. Despite being outnumbered, the Vicentine volunteers, bolstered by papal troops sent to aid the revolution, successfully repulsed the assault in a fierce and bloody battle.

Local writer Vittorio Meneghello vividly described how the artisans and labourers of the Santa Lucia neighbourhood joined the volunteer fighters and soldiers on the barricades erected from Borgo Scroffa to Porta Padova. The uprising involved all social classes, including members of the nobility like Count Camillo Franco, who enrolled his sons in the Civic Guard, and figures like Canon Luigi Maria Fabris, known for his work with street children. Historian Jacopo Cabianca noted the broad participation: “The women of Santa Lucia not only aided the wounded but also prepared and handed ammunition to the fighters sheltering behind the fragile shield of the barricades.”

==== Late 19th-century revitalization ====
Following the devastating flood of 1882, the municipality undertook repairs, including fixing cobblestones and demolishing some dilapidated houses near the Ponte degli Angeli. These works exposed views of landmarks like the “Torreti lane, rustic yet vine-draped, proudly showing its unwarlike turrets.” Restoration efforts focused particularly on the area around San Pietro. In 1890, the private tramway company extended electric street lighting across the Bacchiglione into the district. However, these improvements also led to increased property values and rents, potentially worsening the economic hardship for the poorest residents in these already struggling areas.

In the final decades of the 19th century, traditional individual and family-based trades—such as the washerwomen who worked along the riverbanks near Corte dei Roda—gradually gave way to wage labour in larger workshops or factories. This shift contributed to the strengthening of community bonds and the formation of workers' associations. By the end of the century, Palazzo Angaran hosted three such groups: "The Brotherhood," the Carpenters' association, and the Butchers' association. Alongside these, anticlerical and Masonic groups also emerged, including the ''Lelio Socino'' lodge (named after Lelio Sozzini).

Thus, by the late 19th century, Borgo San Pietro, the city's most populous and proletarian neighbourhood across the river, was a complex mix of urban poverty, social tension, and cultural vibrancy. It was a centre for workers' and artisans' associations and politically leaned towards pro-Risorgimento and progressive ideologies.

Taverns served as important hubs for communal life, hosting frequent gatherings where politics and local culture mingled with card games, singing, and occasional brawls, especially on Sunday nights when visitors from the countryside arrived. Notable establishments included the ''Taverna di Benetto'' (reportedly capable of holding over 300 people) and the ''Taverna della Luna'' in Soave, located just outside Porta Padova. Throughout the year, these venues also hosted social banquets and events with political undertones.

==== The controversy over the naming of the districts ====
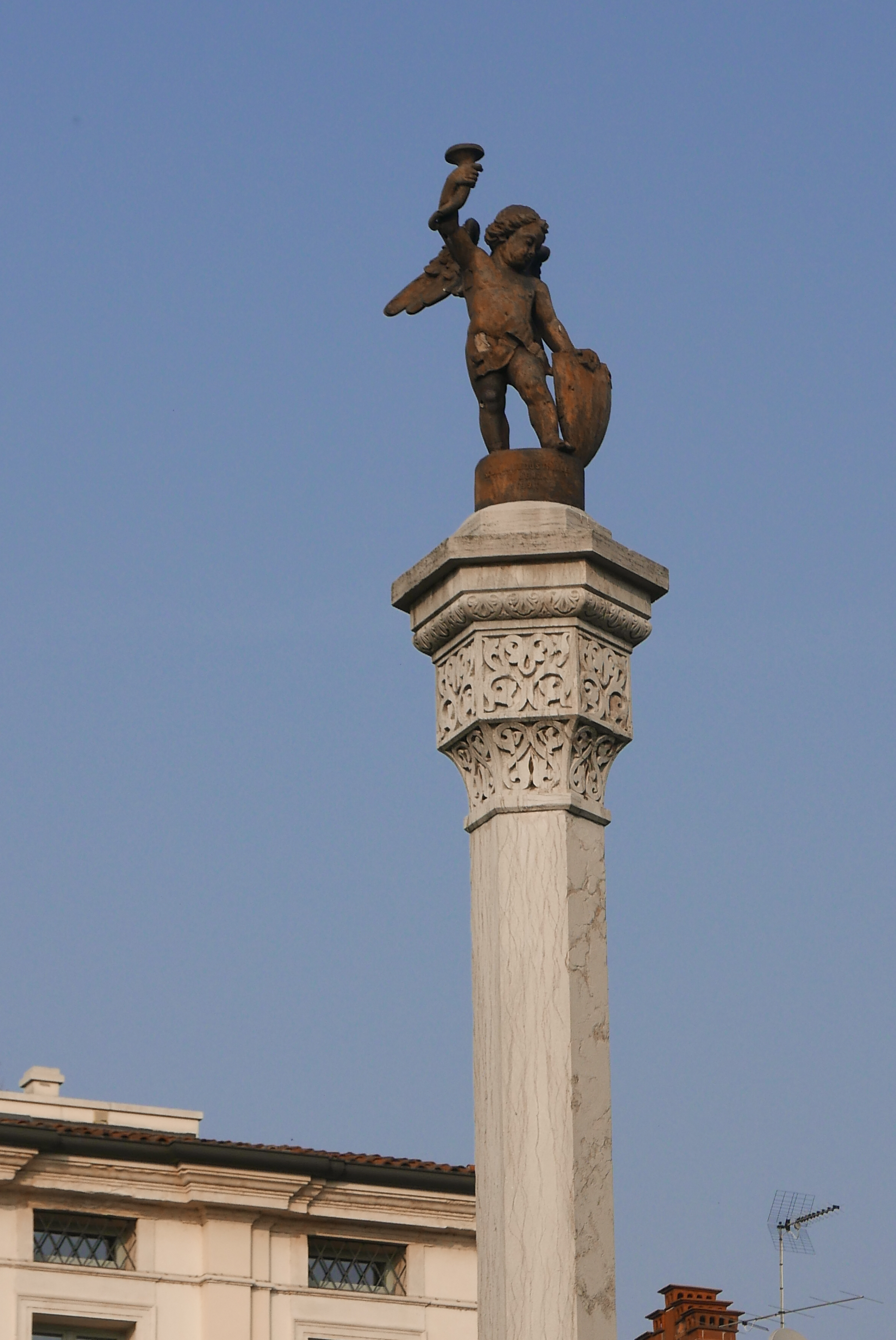
The Angel Column in Piazza XX Settembre

In 1895, an alliance of Catholics and moderate liberals gained a majority on the municipal council, leading to accelerated efforts to modernize the district. However, this period also saw intensified symbolic clashes between supporters of the Savoy monarchy (representing the unified Italian state) and Catholics loyal to the Papacy, which had been in opposition to the state since the capture of Rome in 1870.

In October 1895, a petition signed by 395 citizens requested that Piazza degli Angeli and the adjacent ''Contrà della Fontana Coperta'' be renamed Piazza XX Settembre and Contrà XX Settembre, respectively, to commemorate the date of the breach of Porta Pia. The Council, under Mayor Count Antonio Porto, initially seemed inclined to agree. However, a counter-petition signed by 757 electors strongly opposed changing the traditional name ''Fontana Coperta'' and proposed naming the square Piazza XX Maggio instead, honouring the 1848 defence of Vicenza.

The debate in the council was highly contentious. Some councillors argued for maintaining tradition to avoid civic discord, while others insisted on the politically charged XX Settembre name. A compromise proposal—keeping the name ''Fontana Coperta'' for the street, renaming the square Piazza XX Settembre, and renaming ''Contrà Santa Lucia'' as Via XX Maggio—failed to gain approval. Finally, in 1898, under a new mayor, Eleonoro Pasini, the council voted to apply the name XX Settembre to both the street (''contrà'') and the square, marking a delayed assertion of the nationalist narrative.

==== The 'Republic of Trastevere' and ''Republica de San Zuliàn'' ====
The analogy between Borgo San Pietro and Rome's Trastevere district gained popular traction. Both districts were situated across a major river (the Bacchiglione and the Tiber, respectively), were historically prone to flooding, and were known for their distinct, resilient, and proud working-class populations. The association was further strengthened by the memory of the 1849 Roman Republic, during which the residents of Trastevere had actively supported republican leaders like Mazzini and Garibaldi against French intervention, earning praise from the French commander, General Oudinot, as “true friends of liberty.”

In 1891, local figures Vittorio Cevese and Antonio Colain actively promoted the nickname 'Republic of Trastevere' for the district. While there was some initial resistance, particularly from residents and the washerwomen working near Ponte degli Angeli, the proponents of the nickname ultimately succeeded. On October 25, 1891, a commemorative column designed by Cevese was unveiled in the newly renamed Piazza XX Settembre, accompanied by celebrations including fanfares and fireworks that reportedly lasted until dawn.

Reflecting on the comparison with Rome, Antonio Colain wrote: “The Trasteverine with his customs! His glorious river… how many memories it holds! Our Bacchiglione has its glories too, though its Roman arch is gone; still, we have a Tiber without floods. I like this name—perhaps our local 'Trasteverines' will become famous... here we work, renovate roads, stage shows and donate to charity...” The term ''Republica de San Zuliàn'' was also used locally, referencing the area around the former San Giuliano hospice (Salvi Institute) and its strong sense of community identity.

==== Demolition of the walls and urban expansion ====
The early 20th century brought increased urban growth and rising traffic demands, leading to the partial demolition of the Scaliger walls and the physical expansion of the district beyond its historical boundaries.

In 1910, the Torricelle gate (also known as Porta Padova) was demolished, fully integrating the outer Borgo Padova (or ''San Zuliàn'') area into the contiguous urban fabric of the district. Although Vicenza largely remained confined within its historic walls before World War I, the post-war era saw significant changes. As one historian observed, “the urban form has been swept away by modern development, intolerant of boundaries, sprawling in a shapeless mass, defying centripetal force.”

Further breaches were made in the walls to improve circulation:

- In 1927, the ancient Lisiera gate was reopened, creating a connection between Via IV Novembre and Borgo Scroffa.
- In 1932, the Roblandine Gate was reopened, linking Contrà San Domenico with Via Legione Gallieno.
- In the 1950s, a section of the wall near the former Casale gate was demolished to connect Contrà San Pietro with the new Viale Margherita.

Throughout the 1950s, new streets like Via Ceccarini were built, and Via Legione Gallieno was significantly widened, largely filling in the old defensive moat along the eastern perimeter.

Houses incorporating sections of the Scaliger walls in Borgo San Pietro:

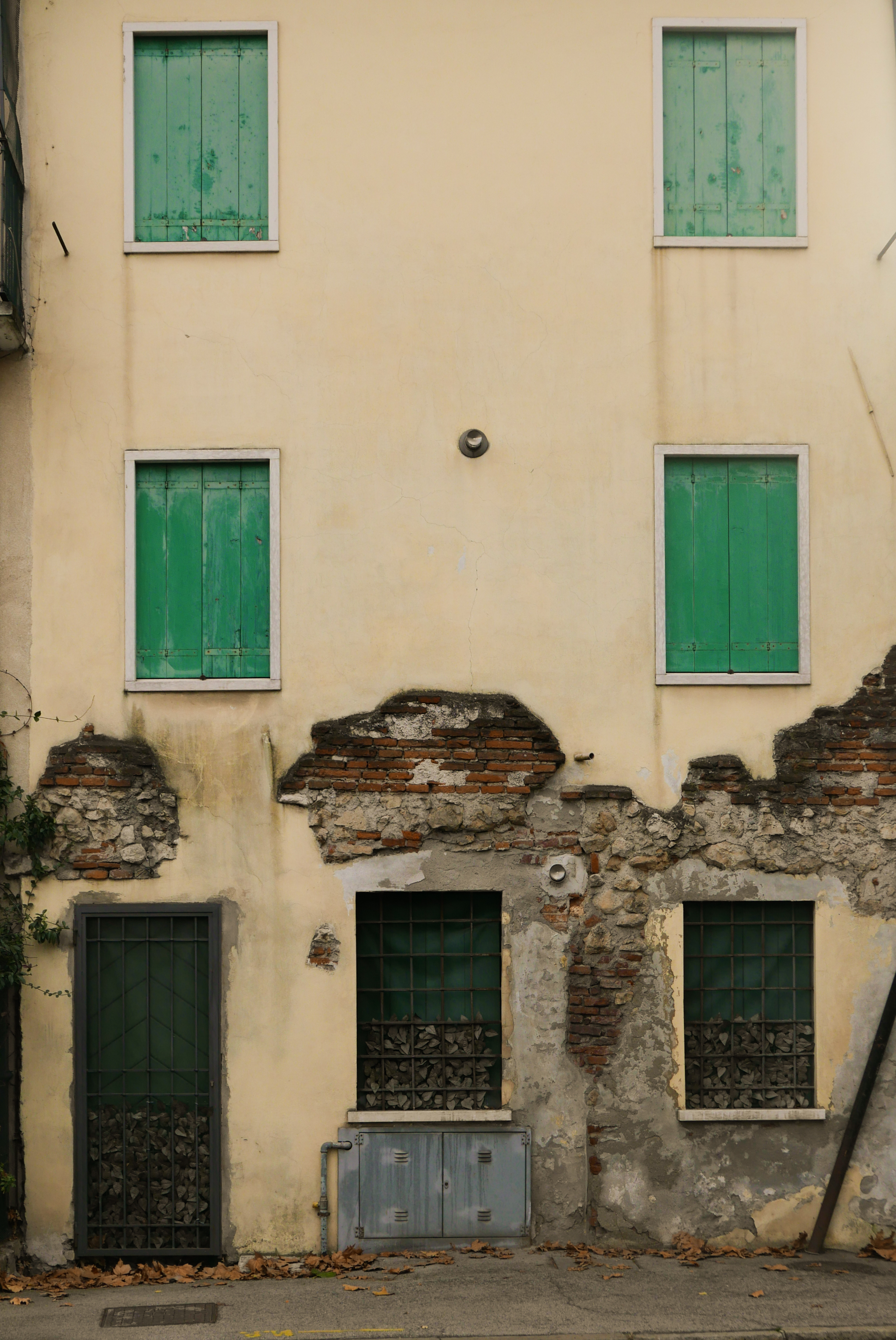
House built against the wall near Porta Padova

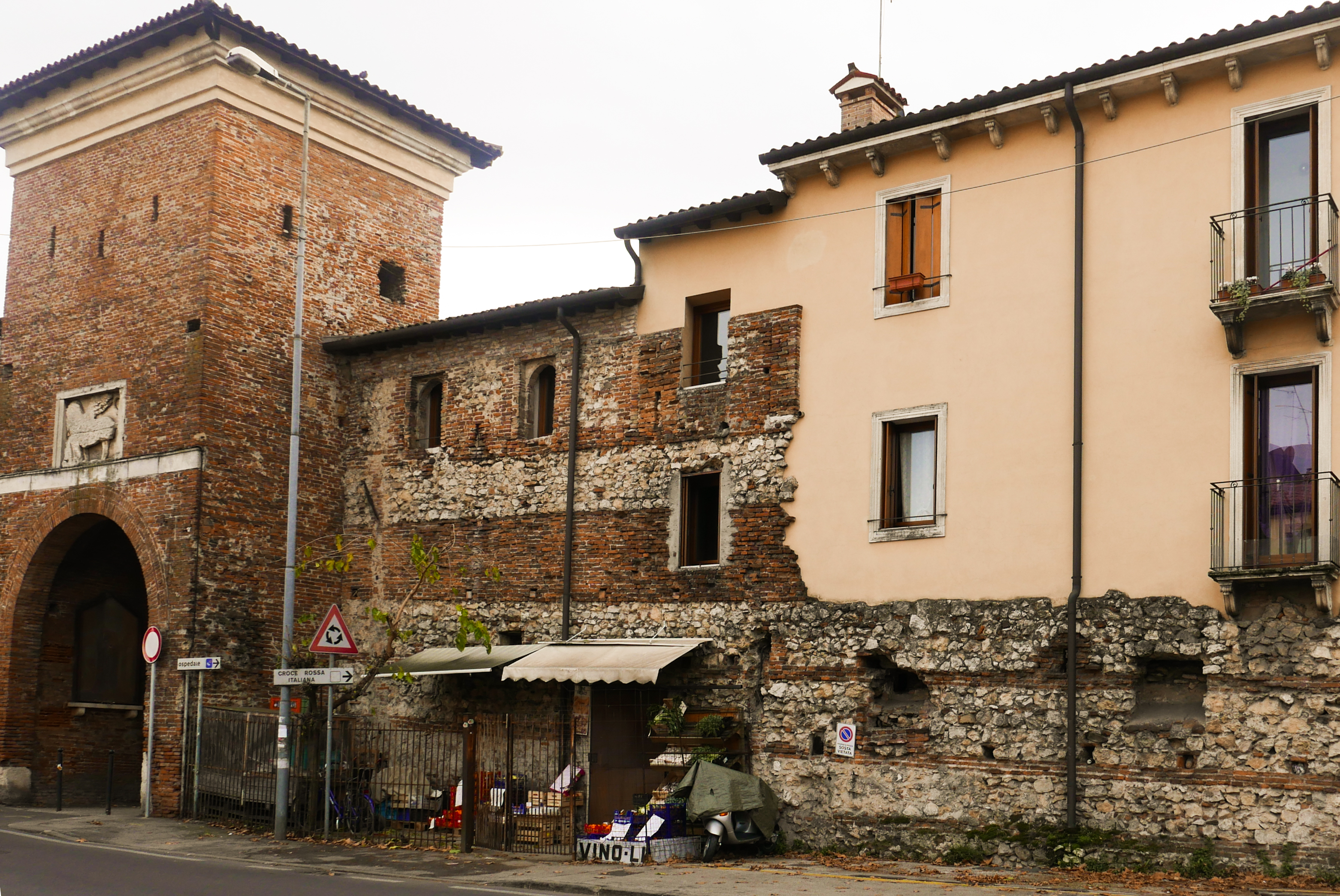
Wall section integrated into residential buildings

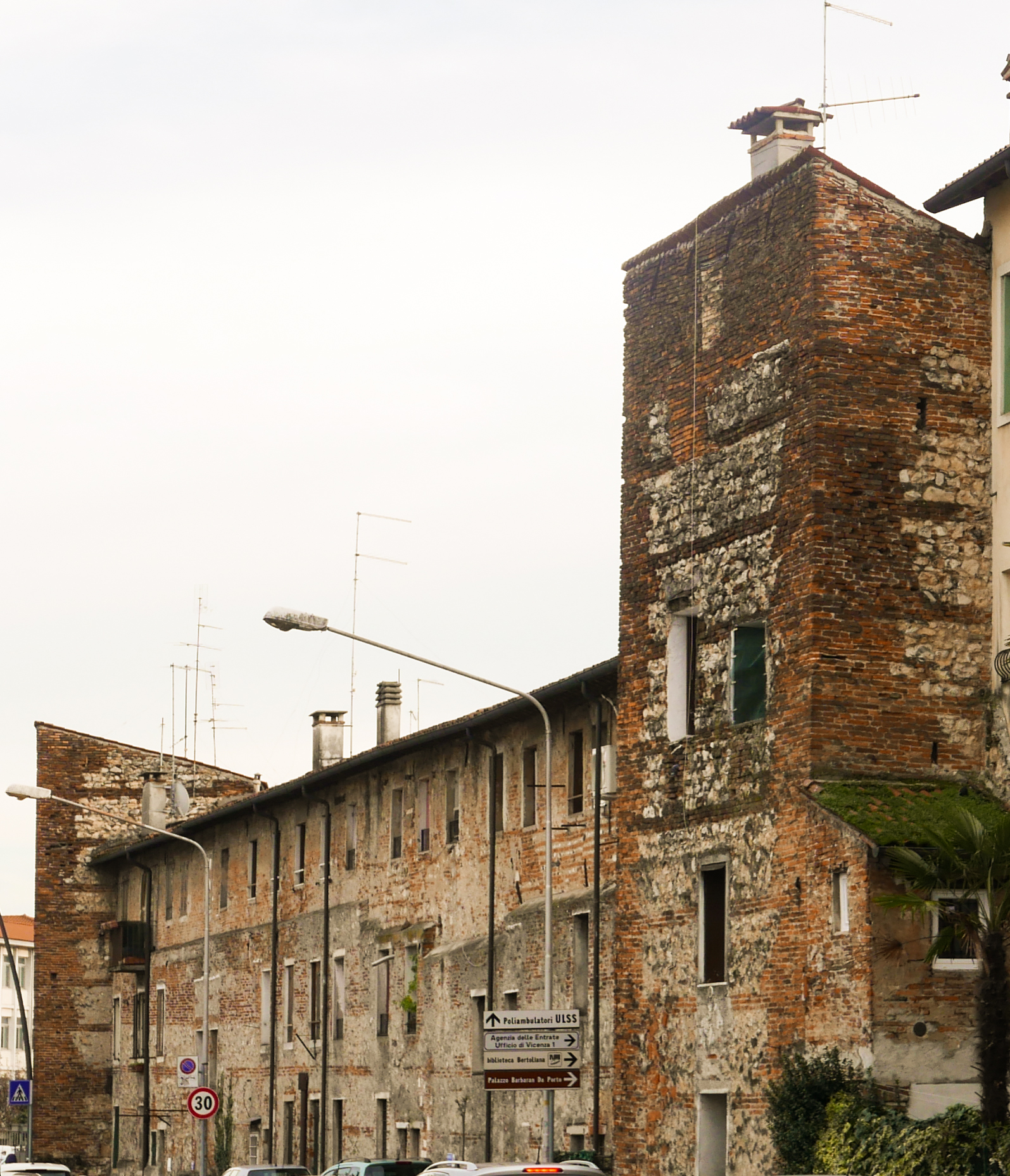
Houses using the medieval wall as a rear structure

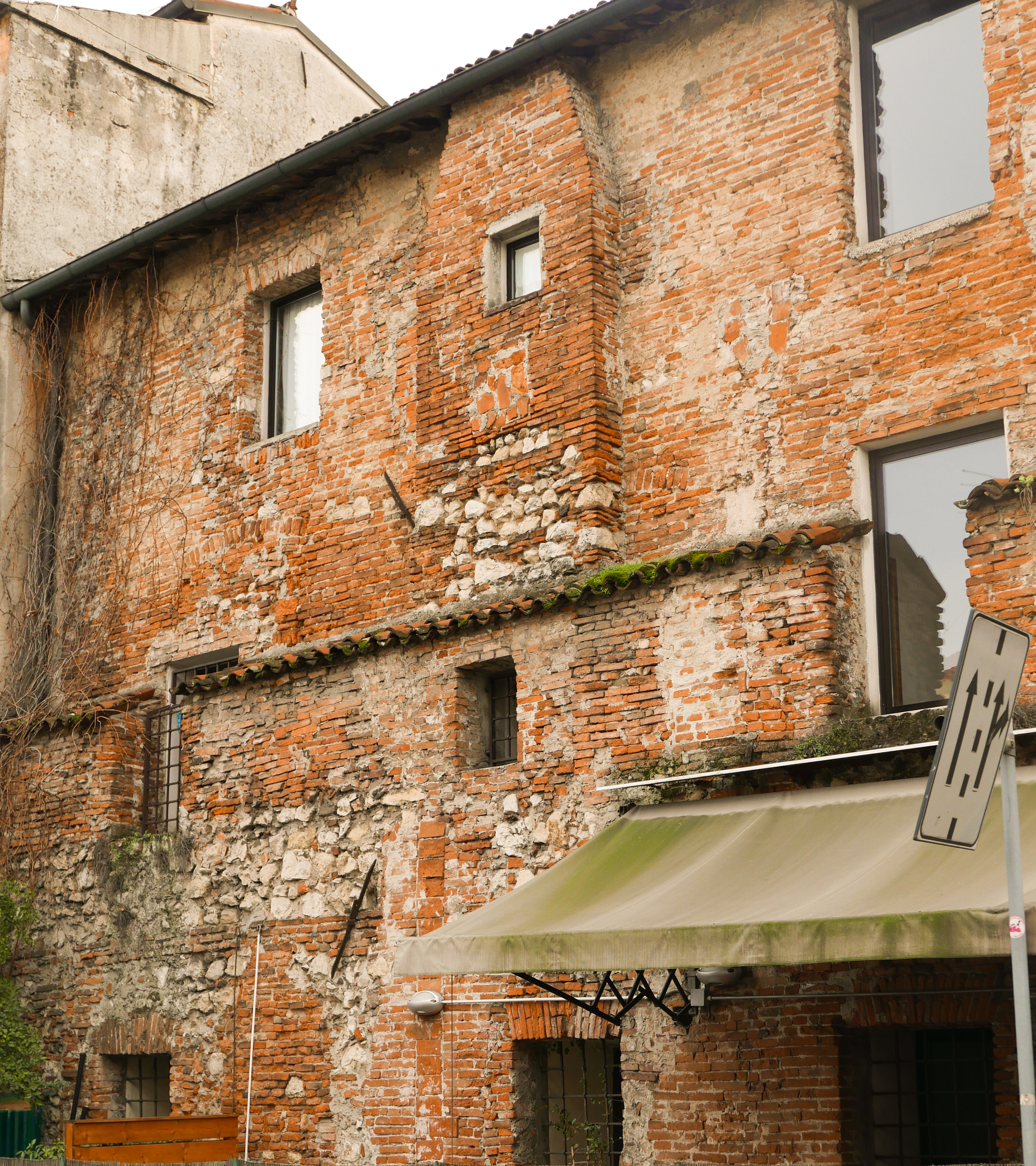
View showing houses built directly onto the Scaliger wall line

== The present district ==
=== The 'Trastevere' Nickname ===
Although never an official designation, the nickname 'Trastevere', originating from popular usage in the late 19th century, became widely accepted and occasionally appeared in documents. The name drew a parallel with Rome's Trastevere district, which lies across the Tiber River and was known for its distinct, historically rebellious working-class population (particularly noted during the 1849 Roman Republic and Garibaldi's 1867 attempt to take Rome). Vicenza's Borgo San Pietro, situated east of the Bacchiglione River beyond the Ponte degli Angeli, shared a similar topographical position (across the main river from the city center) and housed a comparable robust, working-class populace.

The politically charged renaming of the main square and adjacent street to Piazza XX Settembre and Via XX Settembre in 1898 reinforced this perceived identity. Some commentators even extended the analogy by comparing Rome's Tiber Island to a small island that periodically formed below the Ponte degli Angeli from flood debris, though the significance of this comparison is debatable.

The popular nickname inspired playful, sometimes pseudo-subversive carnival celebrations with republican undertones, which were met with popular acclaim. Access to the district from the city center is typically via the Ponte degli Angeli, leading into Piazza XX Settembre, from which the district's main streets radiate.

=== Piazza XX Settembre ===
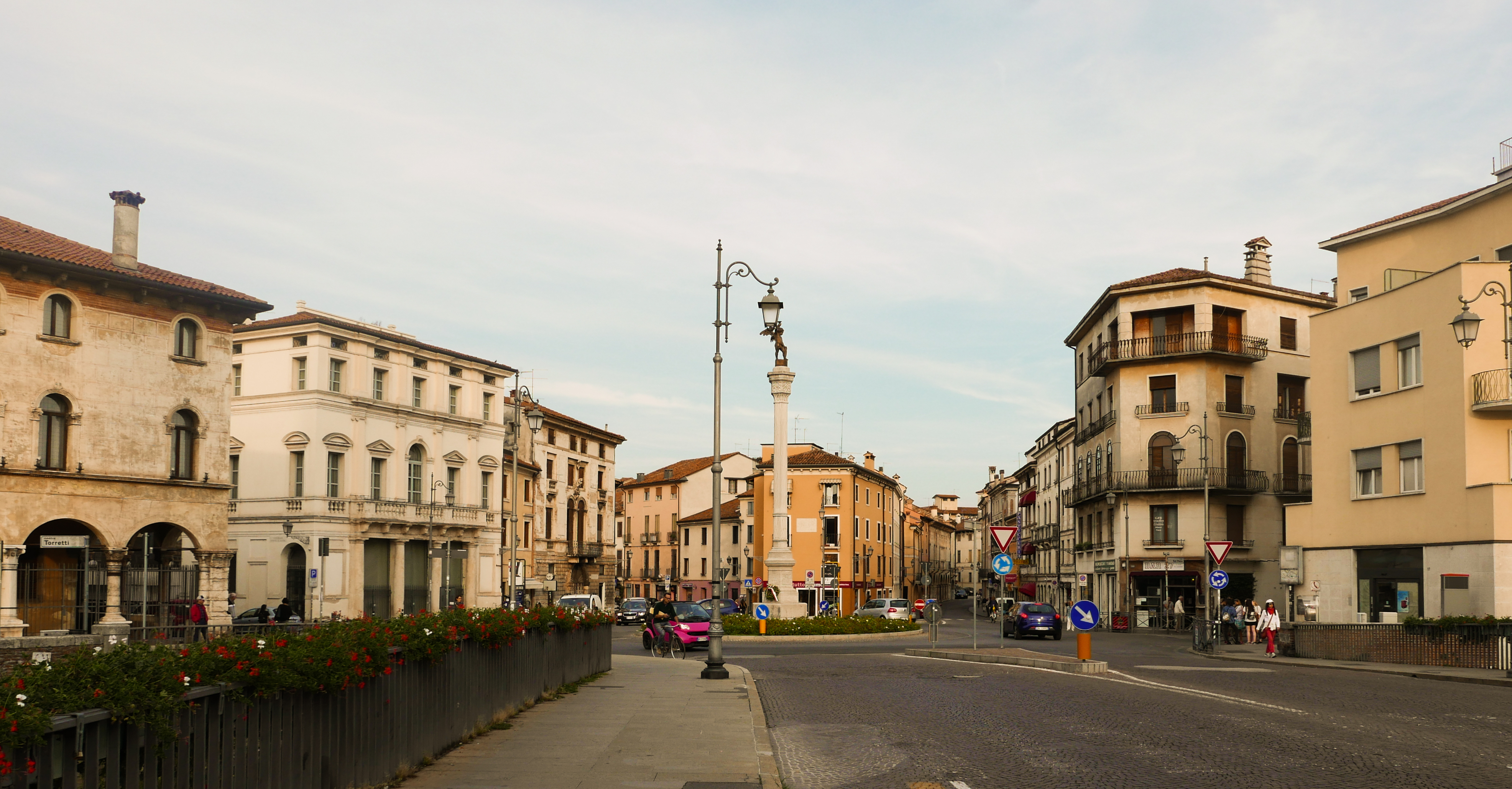
Piazza XX Settembre

Historically, this square was known as ''Piazza del Ponte di Porta San Pietro'', according to documents cited by Silvestro Castellini. By 1858, city guides referred to it as ''Piazzetta degli Angeli'', named after the former church of Santa Maria degli Angeli located near the western end of the Ponte degli Angeli.

In 1891, a Byzantine-style column topped by a bronze angel holding a lit torch was erected near the center of the square. It was sometimes interpreted as "a symbol of liberty and defiance, with Rome as witness." Decades later, following the opening of Via IV Novembre, the column was relocated northward to better accommodate increased traffic flow.

The current name, Piazza XX Settembre, was officially established by a council vote on March 11, 1898, commemorating the Capture of Rome in 1870. This act symbolically affirmed the unity achieved through the Italian Risorgimento, concluding a decade of local debate over the square's name. The rectangular square is architecturally defined by notable buildings including the neo-Renaissance Palazzo Angaran and the 18th-century Palazzo Bonaguro.

=== The contrade ===
The district is historically divided into several contrade (streets or neighbourhoods):

==== ''Contrà Torretti'', ''Stradella dei Orbi'', and ''Corte del Lotto'' ====
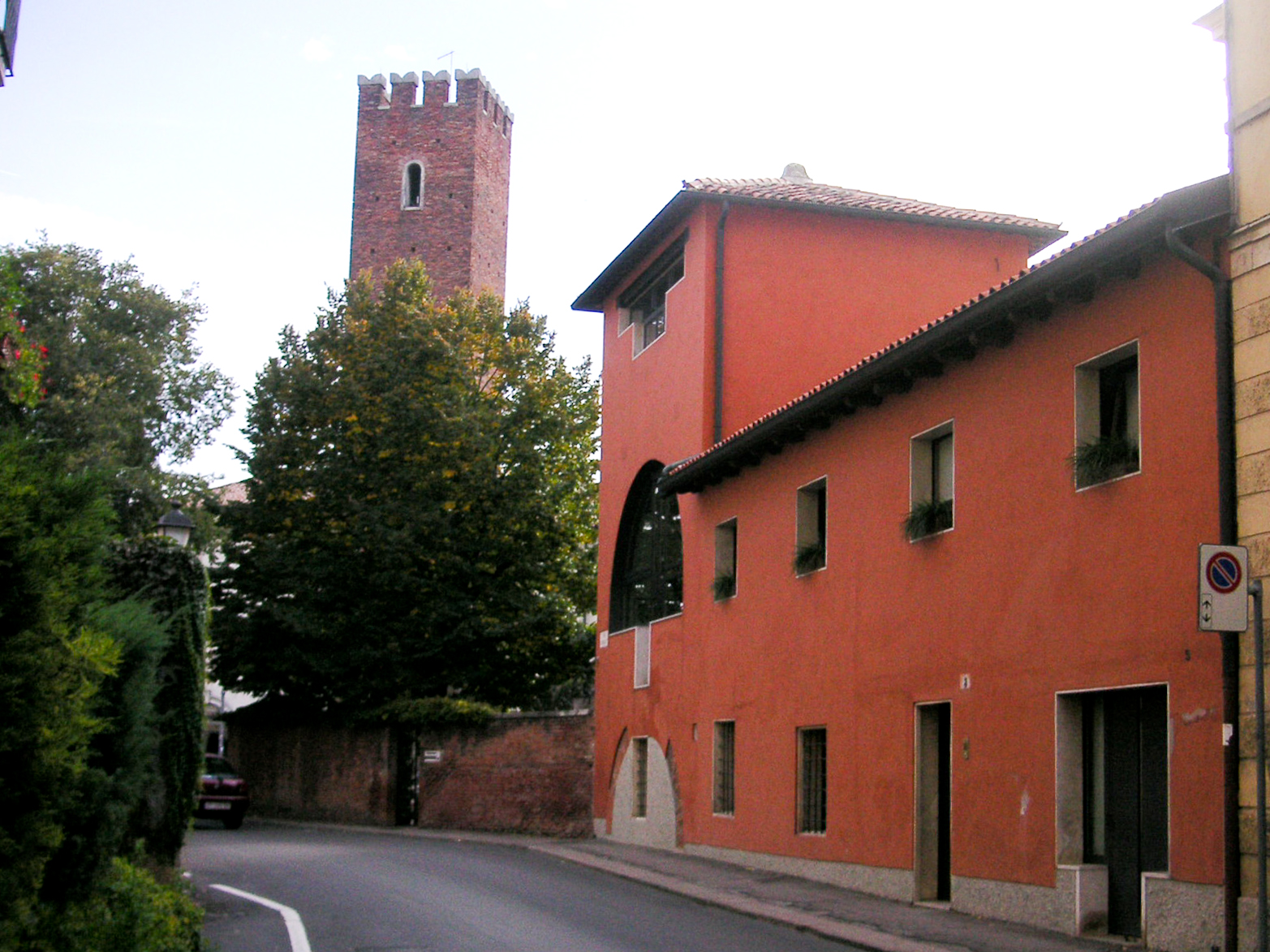
Restored ''torricella'' (small tower) on Via Torretti; Torre Coxina visible behind

- Contrà dei Torretti'' is a narrow lane following the line of the late 14th-century Scaliger fortifications. Its name derives from the small towers (''torretti'') that punctuated the wall, remnants of which can still be discerned within some of the houses built along its path. Palazzo Angaran marks the beginning of the ''contrada'' at the corner with ''Contrà Santa Lucia''.

Presently, the ''contrada'' houses the Vicenza headquarters of the Italian Red Cross in an early 20th-century building, and the diocesan Caritas centre, which includes an attached dormitory. Historically, a brothel known as Villa Lola also operated here.

Two narrow alleys branch off ''Contrà Torretti'':

- ''Stradella dei Orbi'': A short (approx. 70m) lane connecting to ''Contrà Porta Santa Lucia''. Its name likely refers to blind beggars (''orbi'') who may have resided there; in the early 19th century, it was simply documented as "the lane to Torretti."
- ''Corte del Lotto'': Named after the Lotto family, who owned and renovated properties within this small courtyard.

==== ''Contrà Santa Lucia'' ====
This road connects Piazza XX Settembre to the Porta Santa Lucia, a surviving (though altered) gate from the Scaliger era, which leads out towards the Borgo Santa Lucia area. The ''contrada'' retains a distinctive character due to its medieval and Renaissance buildings, many featuring low, narrow porticos.

Historically an important route corresponding to the Roman Via Postumia, its significance as a thoroughfare diminished after the opening of Via IV Novembre in 1927, which created a more direct path towards Borgo Scroffa. In 1896, during the heated debates over street naming, councillor Paolo Lioy proposed renaming ''Contrà Porta Santa Lucia'' as ''Via XX Maggio'' to commemorate the 1848 victory over Austrian forces near the gate. The proposal, intended partly as a compromise regarding the Piazza XX Settembre renaming, failed to gain majority support.

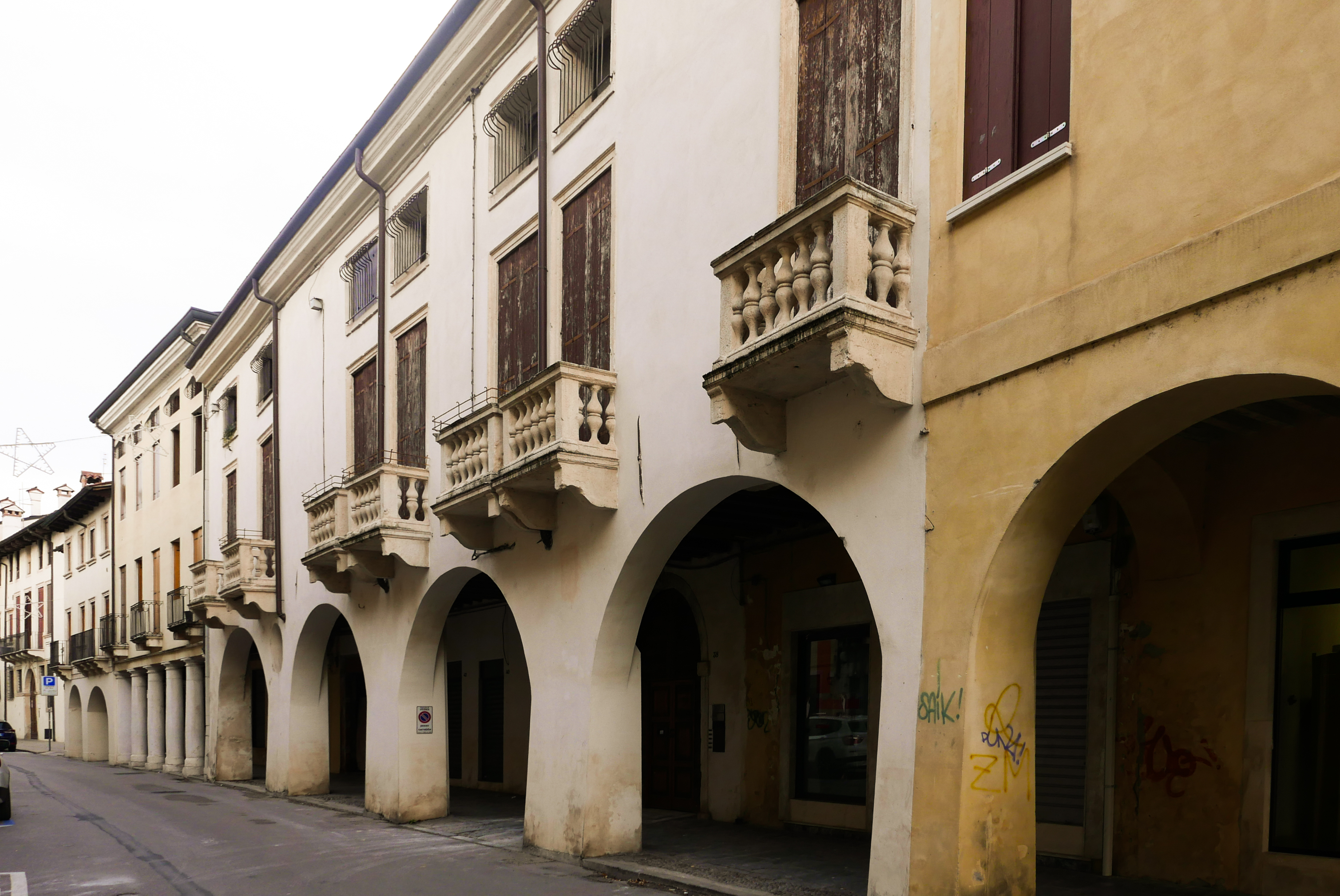
Porticos along ''Contrà Santa Lucia''

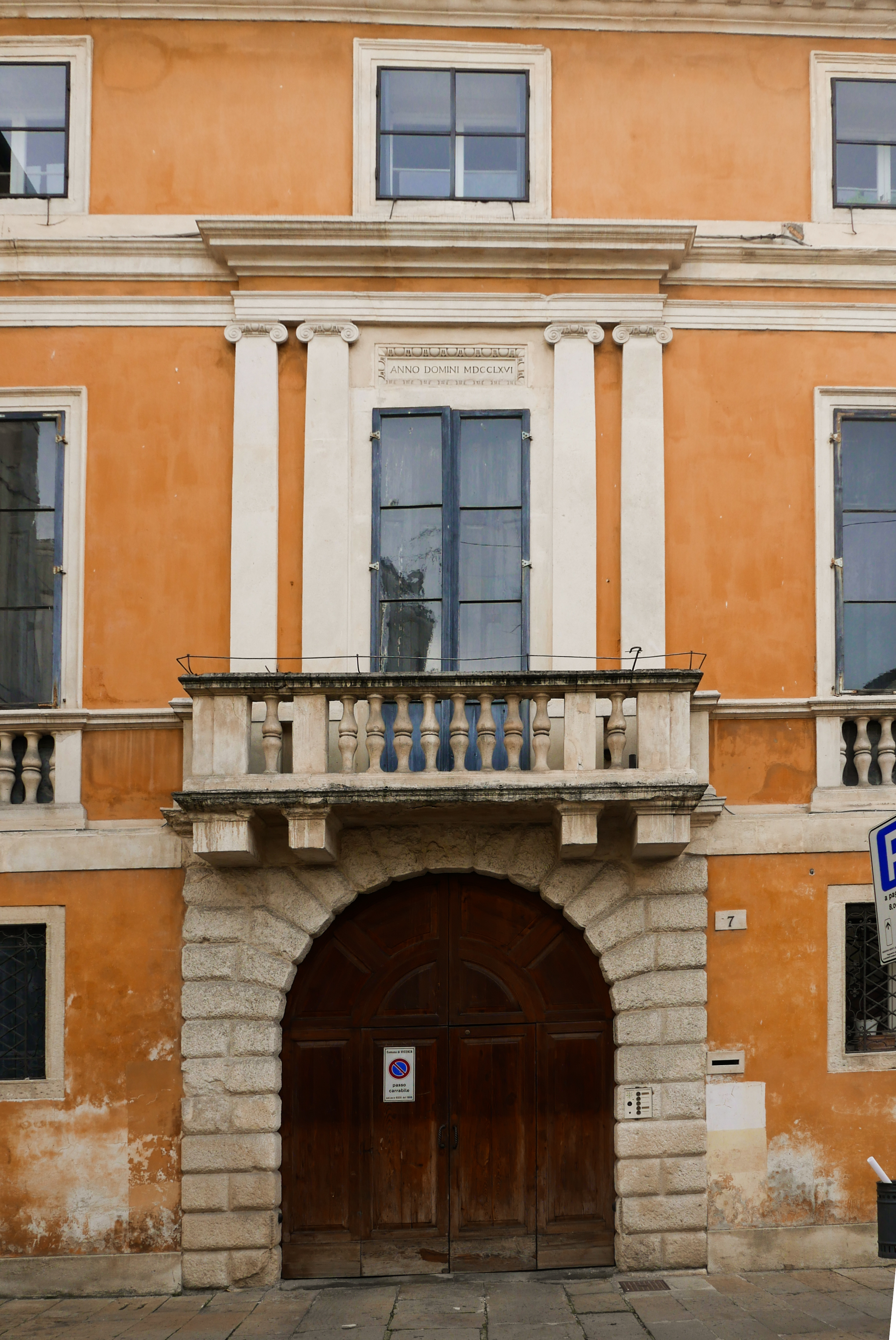
18th-century palace on ''Contrà Santa Lucia''

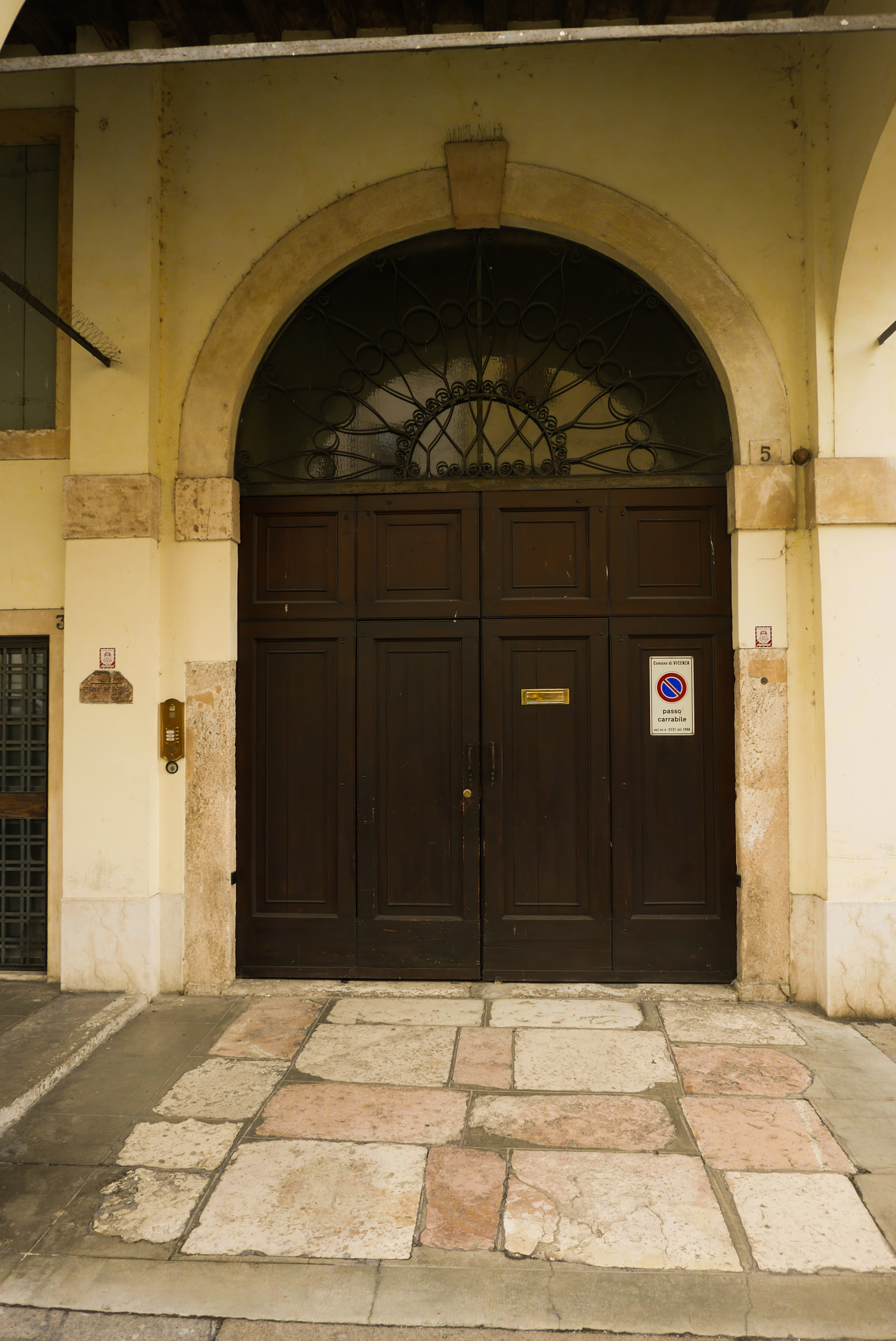
Palace near Palazzo Angaran

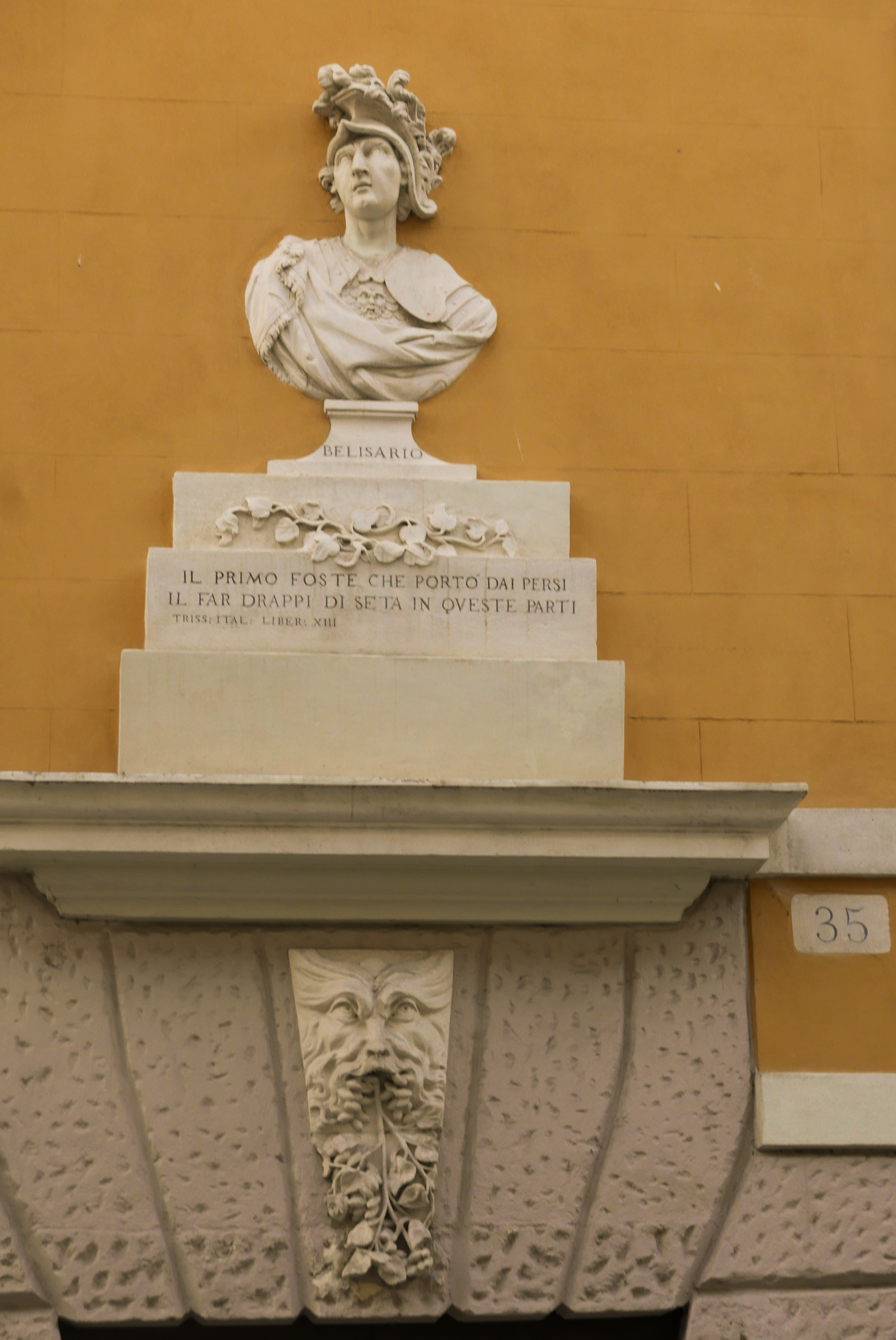
Bust of Belisarius above a doorway

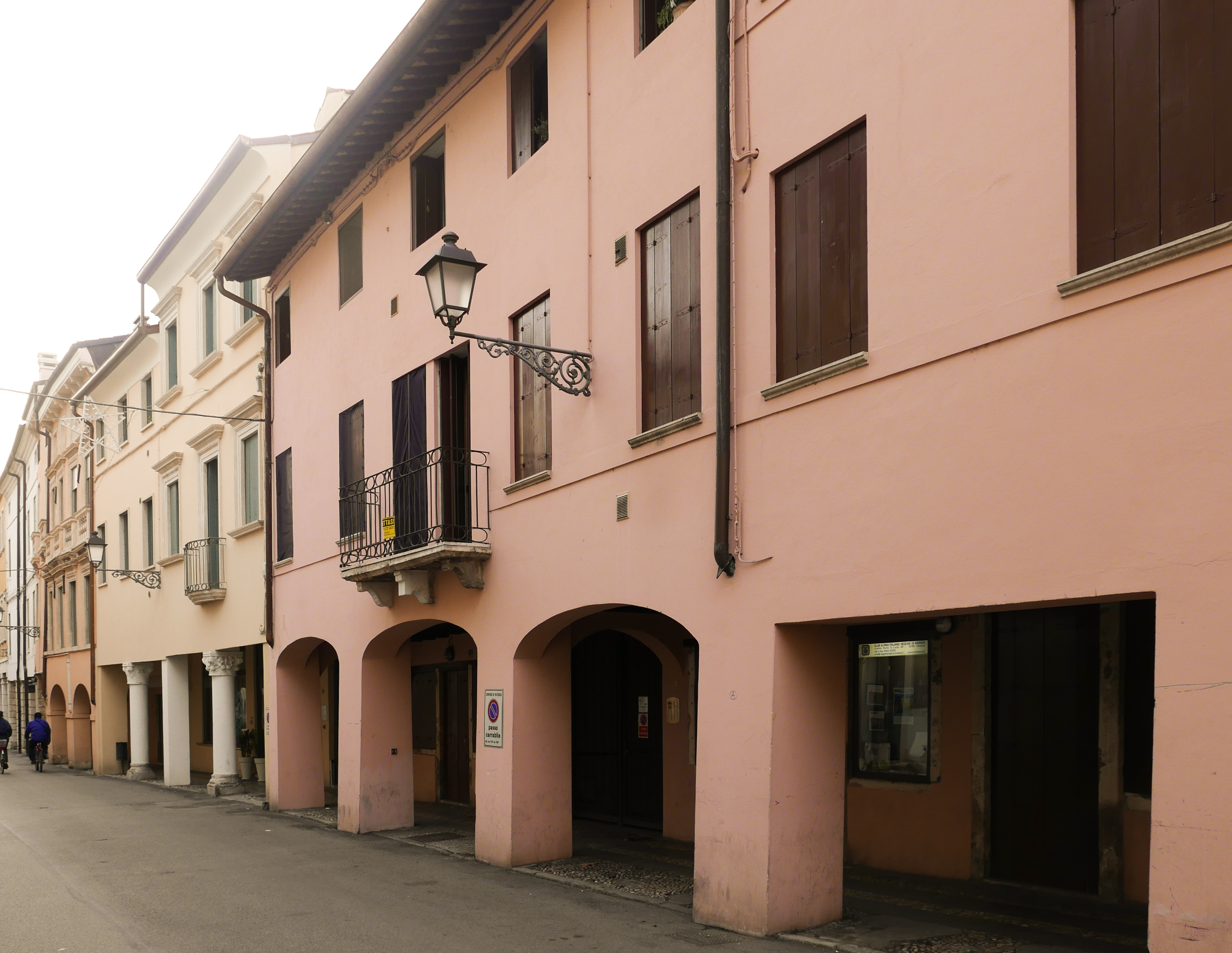
View of porticos looking towards Piazza XX Settembre

==== ''Contrà delle Mure'' ====
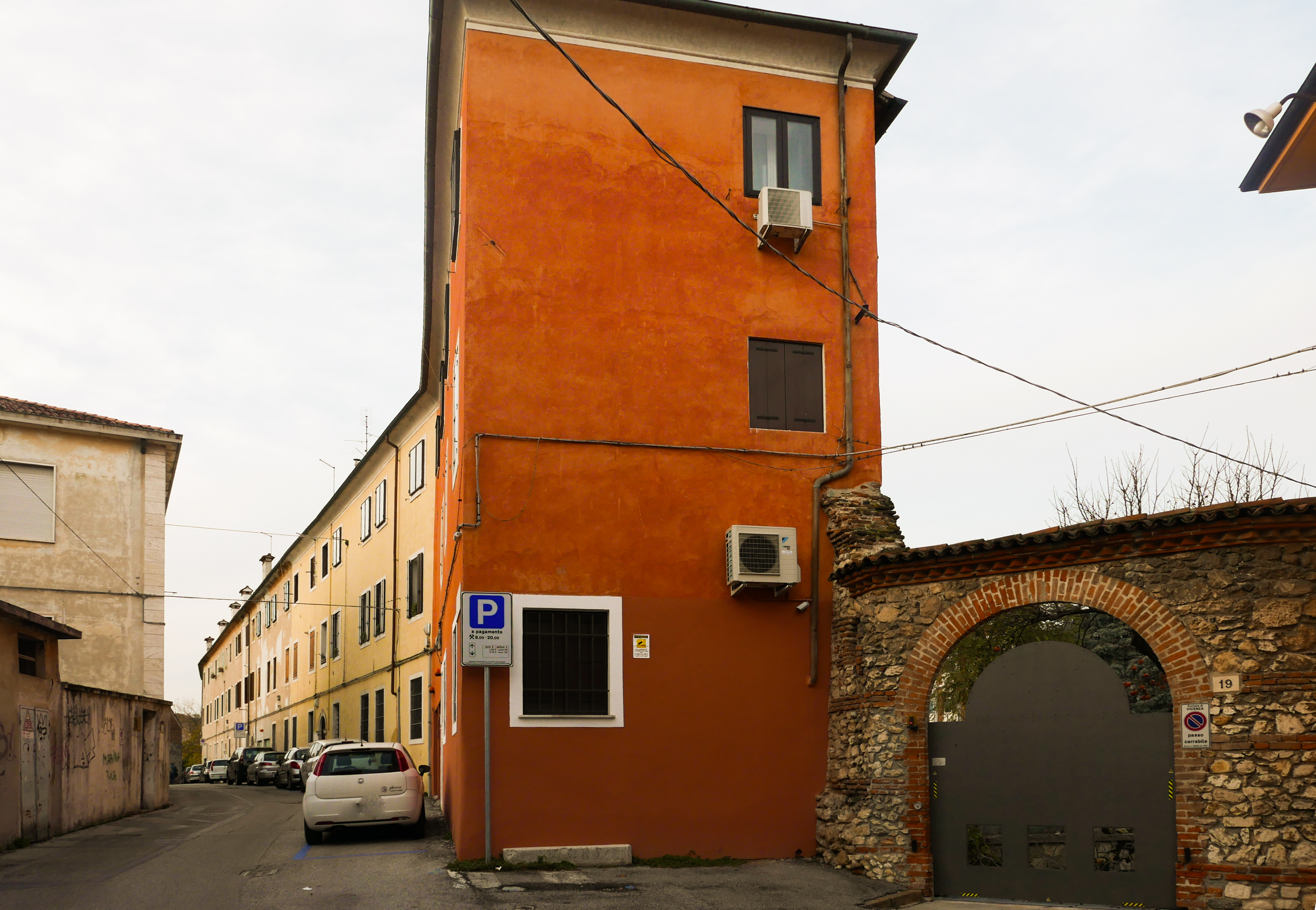
Homes historically associated with ''samitari'' (silk weavers) alongside a Scaliger wall turret

The name ''Contrà delle Mure'' refers collectively to several streets that run along the inner side of the Scaliger walls. While officially recognized and appearing in historical documents and guides, the walls themselves have now largely disappeared, surviving only in short segments integrated into later buildings.

Starting from the north near Piazza dell'Araceli, ''Contrà Mure d’Araceli'' runs towards ''Contrà Porta Santa Lucia'', named for its proximity to the Church of Santa Maria in Araceli. Crossing ''Contrà Porta Santa Lucia'', the route continues as ''Contrà Mure Porta Santa Lucia'', passes ''Contrà delle Fontanelle'', and, beyond Via IV Novembre, becomes ''Contrà delle Mure San Domenico'', running behind the former San Domenico church (now the Conservatory).

This section is a quiet, narrow street ending at ''Contrà San Domenico''. A breach made in the wall here in 1932 (reopening the old Roblandine gate) connects to Via Legione Gallieno. This area, along with the final stretch of ''Contrà San Domenico'', features rows of houses historically occupied by ''samitari'' – artisans who wove ''samit'', a type of silk fabric often incorporating gold threads, a trade that flourished until the 18th century.

South of ''Contrà San Domenico'', the line continues as the short ''Contrà Mure Porta Padova''. Very little of the original wall remains visible here, aside from a turret and fragments revealed during recent renovations. The street itself is fragmented, reduced to short sections at either end and interrupted in the middle by a square created in front of the Giacomo Zanella school complex (built 1905-06) to improve pupil safety.

==== ''Contrà delle Fontanelle'' and Via IV Novembre ====
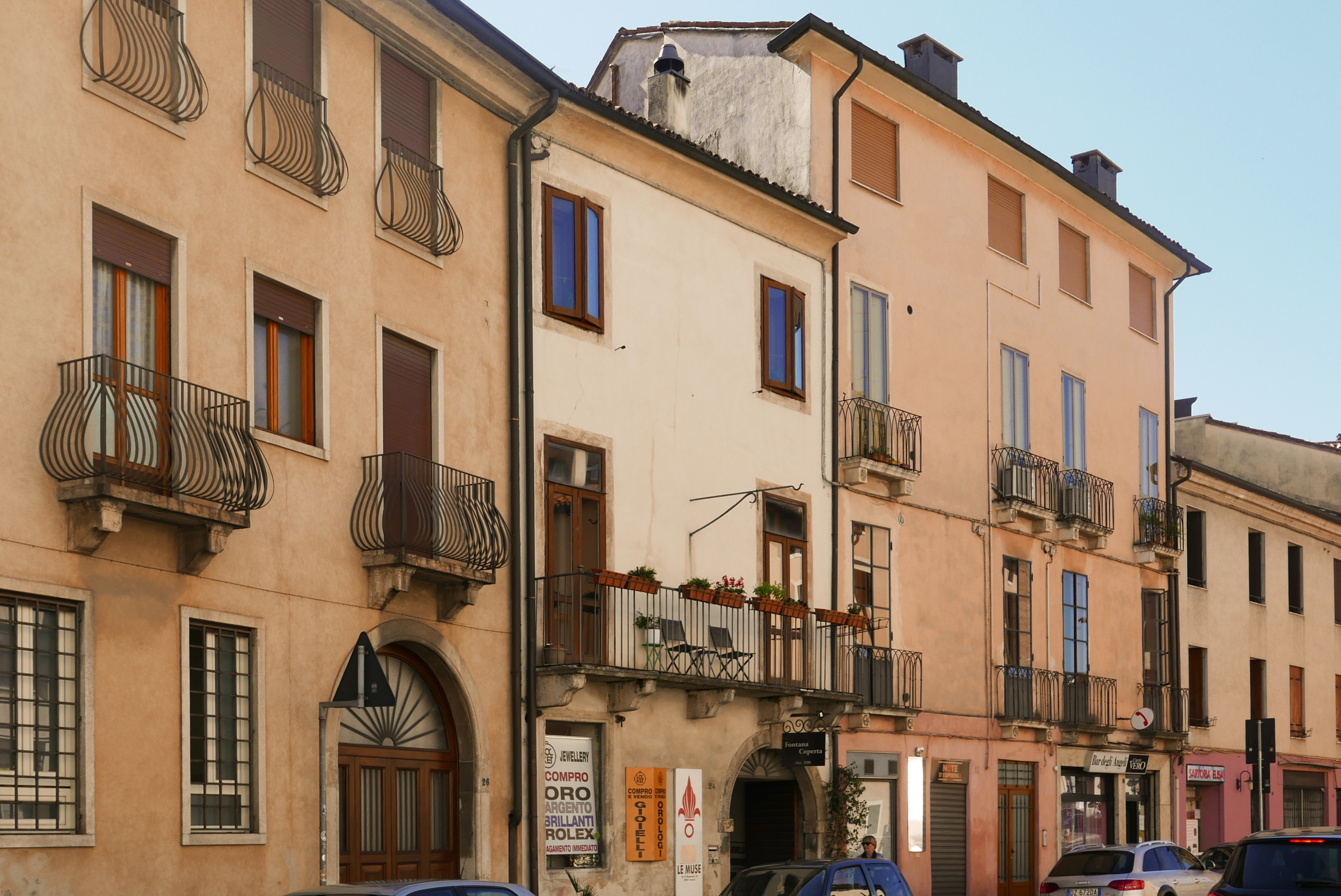
Initial stretch of Via IV Novembre, featuring late 19th/early 20th-century homes

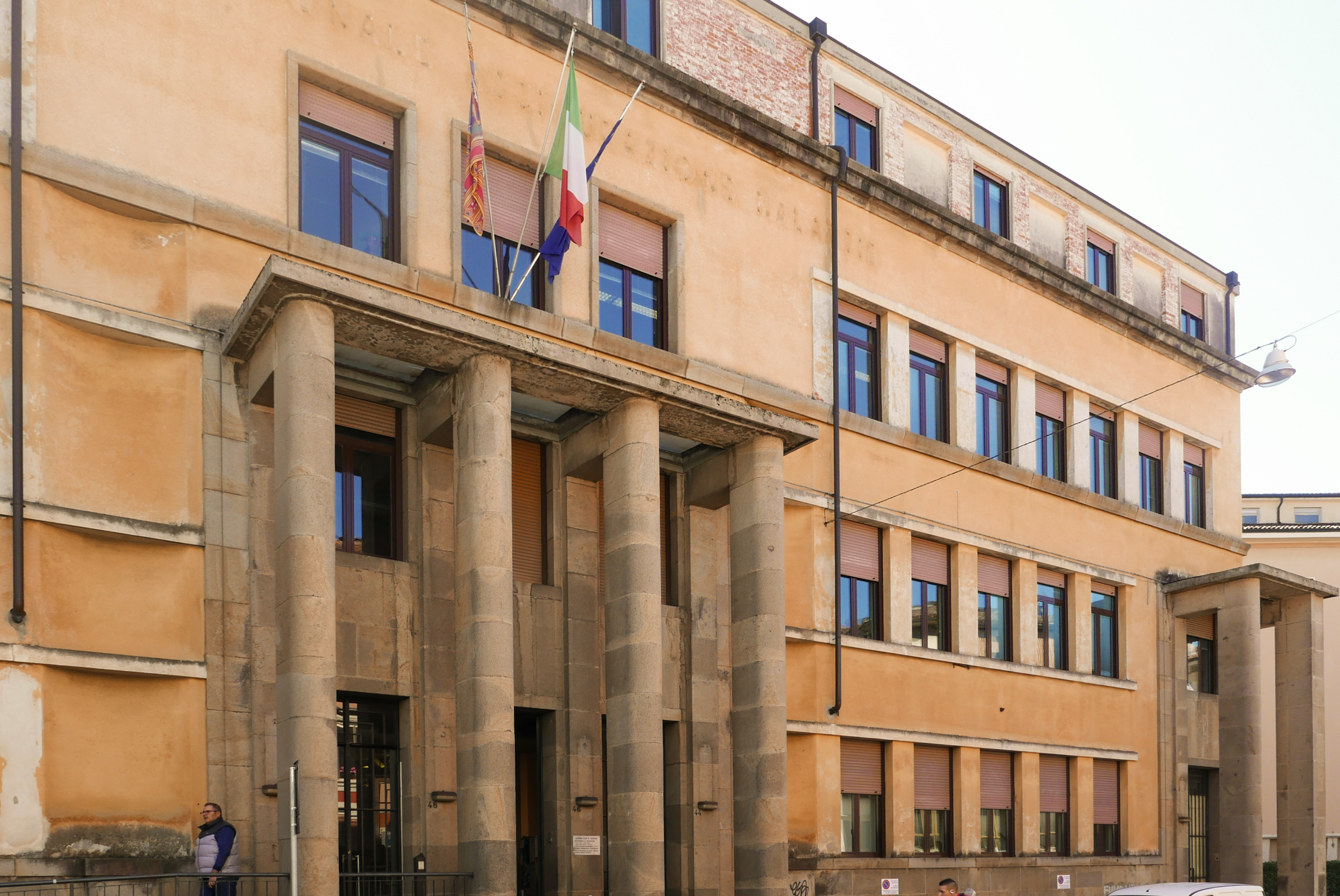
Palazzo INPS (now ULSS offices) on Via IV Novembre

Until the 1920s, the name ''Contrà delle Fontanelle'' applied to the street running from Piazza XX Settembre to the beginning of the current, shorter ''Contrà Fontanelle''. When a breach was made in the Scaliger wall to provide access to Borgo Scroffa, this initial section was incorporated into the newly constructed thoroughfare and renamed Via IV Novembre on April 16, 1927, commemorating the armistice date ending Italy's involvement in World War I.

The original path of ''Contrà delle Fontanelle'' extended further along the line of the ''Strada del Romano'', perpendicular to today's Via IV Novembre, connecting towards ''Contrà San Domenico''. This route is now physically blocked by the Chapel of Santa Bertilla, part of the Farina Institute complex, although the historical alignment remains discernible from aerial views dividing the institute's buildings.

The name “Fontanelle” (little fountains) likely derives from local natural springs, similar to the nearby former ''Contrà Fontana Coperta''. Claims by older historians, such as Francesco Barbarano de' Mironi, that the name originated from Roman baths are considered dubious, primarily because this area lay outside the Roman city walls.

The large Farina Institute complex, housing schools run by the Dorothean Sisters, was constructed here in the late 19th century. During the Fascist period, a significant building in the ''Stile Littorio'' architectural style was added along Via IV Novembre; it originally housed the INPS (National Social Security Institute) and now contains offices for the ULSS (Local Public Health Services).

==== ''Contrà della Fontana Coperta'' and ''Contrà XX Settembre'' ====
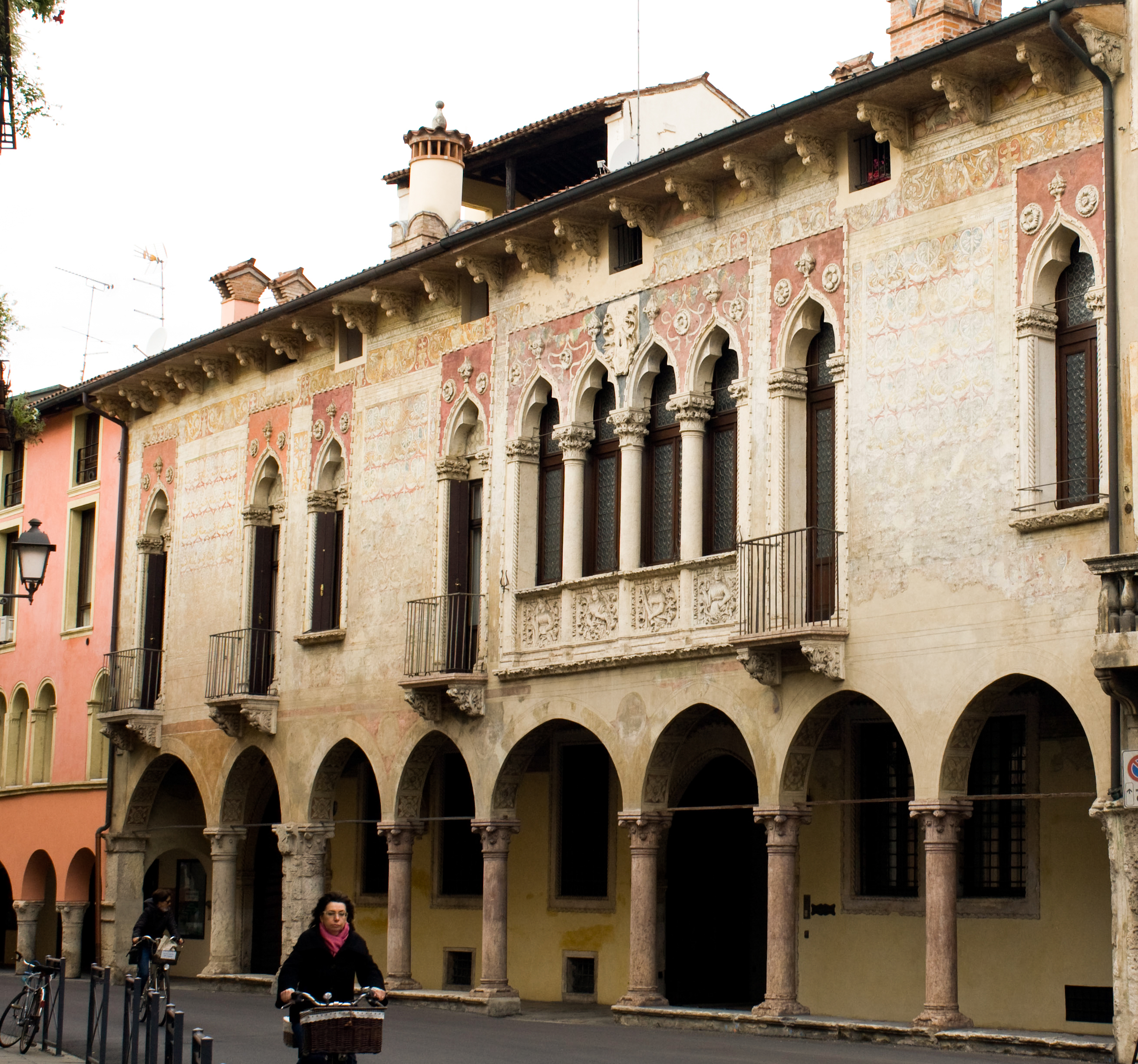
Façade of Palazzo Regaù on Contrà XX Settembre

Until 1898, the street currently named Via XX Settembre was known as ''Contrà della Fontana Coperta''. The name originated from a public fountain located at the street's southern end, near the junction with ''Contrà San Domenico'' and ''Contrà Porta Padova''. It was called 'coperta' (covered) because a canopy sheltered people drawing water from sun and rain. Although the fountain was removed in the late 18th century, the name persisted in common usage until the controversial council vote on March 11, 1898, officially renamed it Via XX Settembre.

This short ''contrada'' (approx. 100m) contains several historic buildings, most notably Palazzo Regaù, an example of Venetian late-Gothic architecture. At the intersection with ''Contrà San Domenico'' and ''Contrà Porta Padova'' stands Palazzo Franco, constructed in 1830 based on a design by Antonio Piovene.

==== ''Contrà San Domenico'' and ''Stradella delle Cappuccine'' ====
This area, historically known as ''Borgo delle Roblandine'', has long been defined by the presence of religious institutions. The convent of Dominican nuns was established in the 13th century, followed by a Capuchin convent in the 17th century. After the Napoleonic suppression of religious orders in 1810, these buildings were repurposed for various social and cultural uses.

The church of San Domenico, associated with the 13th-century Dominican convent (rebuilt from the 15th century onwards), was deconsecrated after 1810. Today, the former convent complex houses the Arrigo Pedrollo Conservatory of Music.

Opposite the San Domenico complex, Capuchin Poor Clares acquired property in 1635 to establish a new convent "for greater devotion and peace in the service of God" naming the adjacent lane ''Stradella delle Cappuccine''. Concerns about noise led the Venetian overseer Tomaso Mocenigo Soranzo to issue a decree mandating silence in 1733, recorded on a stone plaque still visible today.

After 1810, the former Capuchin site housed the Soccorso institute and later the Soccorsetto for vulnerable girls. The former Dominican site housed the municipal male orphanage from 1875. In 1921, the former Capuchin convent became the Casa della Provvidenza, run by the Sisters of Charity (known as the Sisters of Maria Bambina). Currently, the Territorial Service for Addictions (SerD) of the Vicenza ULSS is located at the southern end of ''Contrà San Domenico''.

==== ''Contrà Porta Padova'', ''Corso Padova'', and Viale Margherita ====
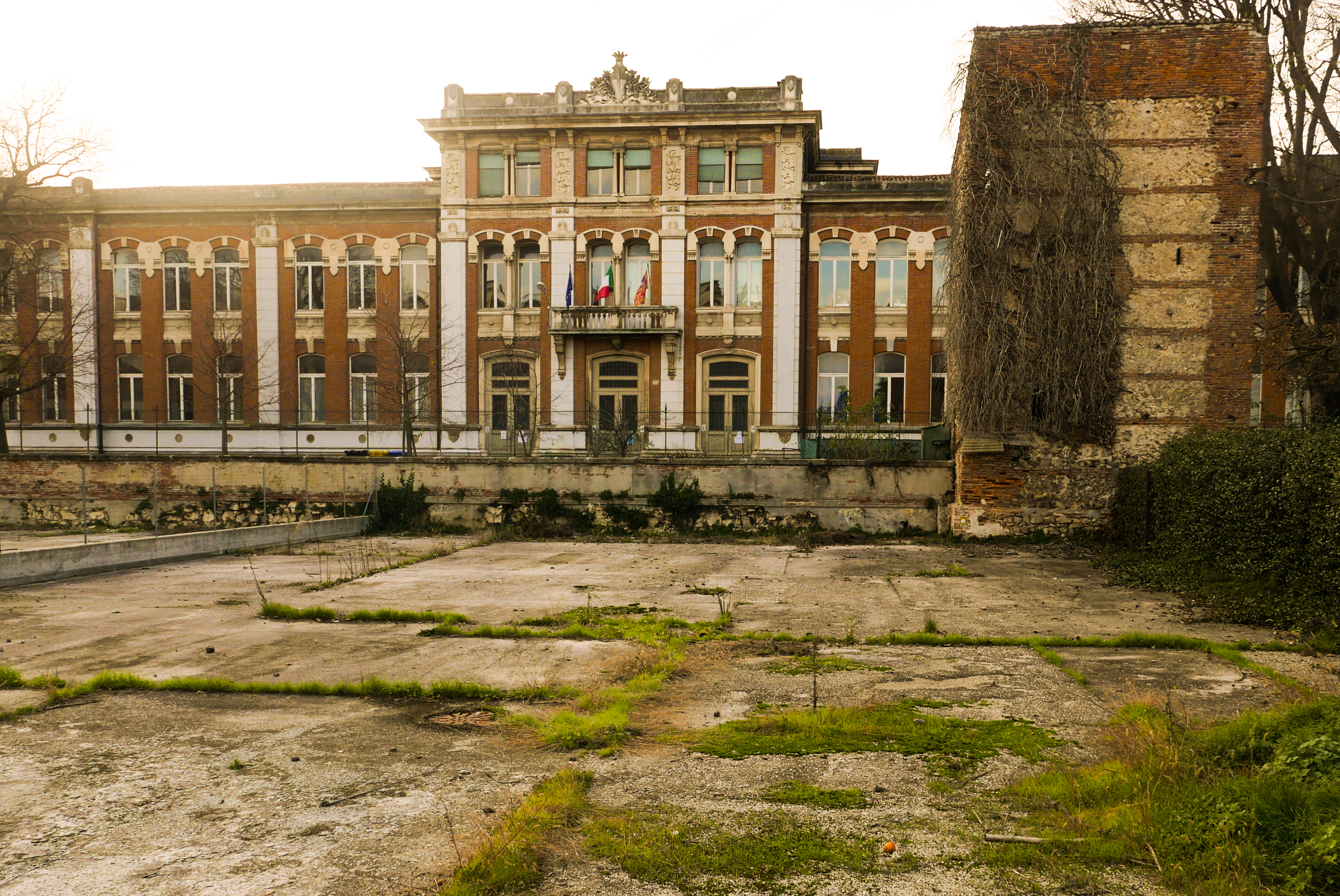
Primary school at Porta Padova: the turret of the Scaliger walls is on the right, bordering the former moat area.

Until 1910, ''Contrà Porta Padova'' extended from ''Contrà XX Settembre'' south to the ''Torricelle'' gate in the Scaliger wall. Beyond the gate lay the Borgo Padova. The gate was demolished in 1910, although remnants of the wall still mark its former position. In 1950, the name ''Contrà Porta Padova'' was officially extended southward to Viale Margherita, removing the distinction.

The term ''corso'' (course or avenue) came into official use around 1911 to denote major arteries leading from the center towards the city exits, gradually replacing ''borgo'' for areas like Padova which were no longer truly outside the city. ''Corso Padova'' is now a wide, straight commercial street running southward from the end of ''Contrà Porta Padova'' towards the railway viaduct, transforming the ancient ''borgo'' into a busy modern artery.

Viale Margherita is a roughly 900-meter avenue running from ''Contrà Porta Padova'' eastward to Piazzale Fraccon at the base of Monte Berico. Its name, long used popularly, derives from a villa near the Bacchiglione bridge that featured a daisy (''margherita'') motif. Its westernmost section overlaps the historic Borgo Padova. The easternmost section, from the Retrone river bridge to Piazzale Fraccon, historically belonged to Borgo Berga. The central section was constructed in 1876, following an 1873 decision, coinciding with hydraulic engineering works designed by engineer Beroaldi to separate the Bacchiglione and Retrone rivers and mitigate the disastrous floods that frequently afflicted the city.

==== ''Contrà'', Piazza, and ''Stradella San Pietro'' ====
Named after the important Benedictine monastery and its church, ''Contrà San Pietro'' originally terminated at Piazza San Pietro. In 1950, the name was extended along a newly developed section connecting to Viale Margherita, passing the modern buildings of the Trento Institute.

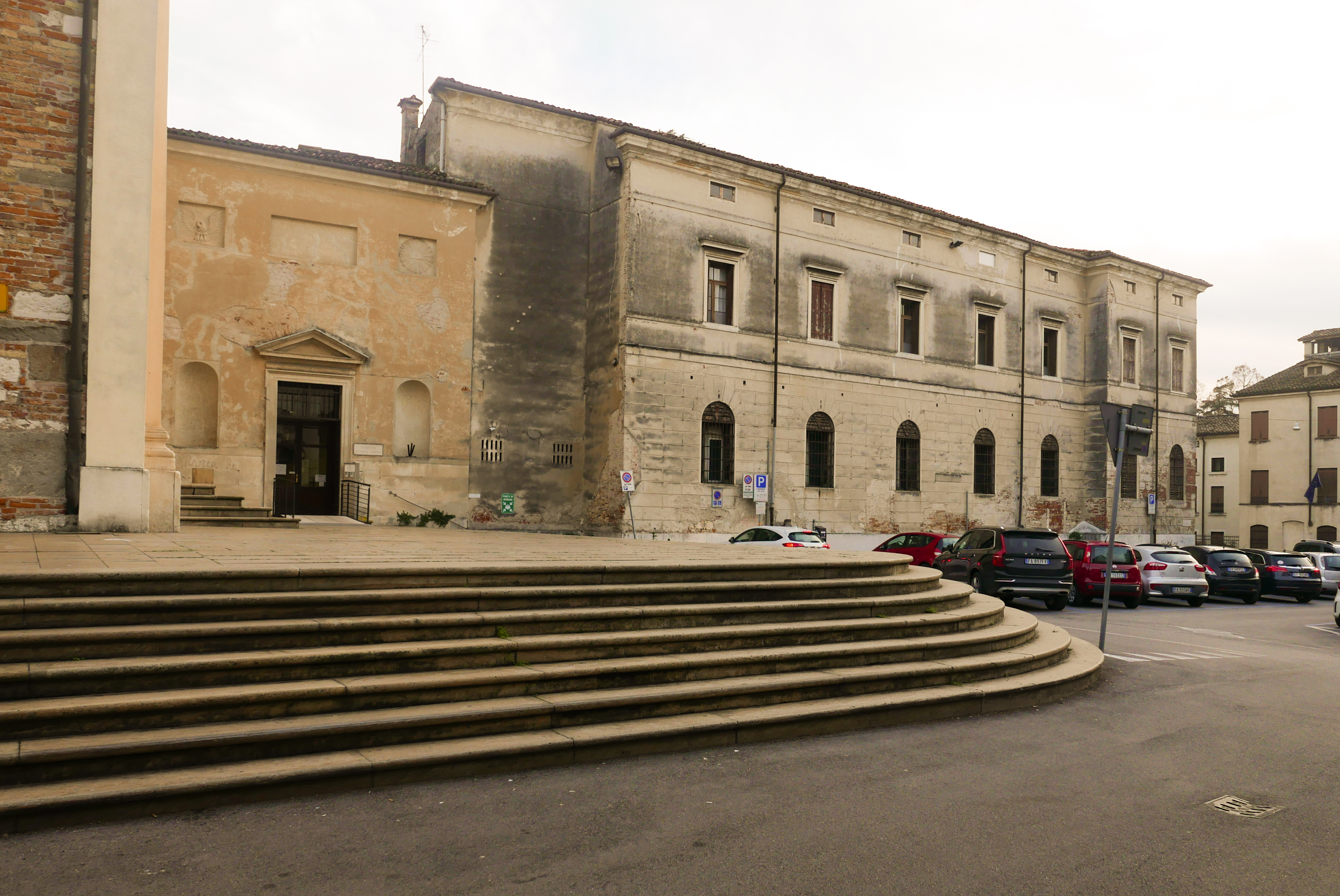
Piazza San Pietro

Piazza San Pietro is situated in front of and alongside the parish church, set on a slight artificial incline accessed by wide steps. The space directly before the church façade, once enclosed by a wall, constituted the ''zimiterium sive sacratum'' (cemetery or sacred precinct). This historical function is recalled in the local dialect term ''sagrà'' still used by residents. In the 19th century, the piazza served as a social gathering place and a popular outdoor play area for local children.

On the square's northwest side stands the 15th-century Oratorio dei Boccalotti. Opposite, near the entrance to the Trento Institute, formerly stood the church of San Vitale, documented as early as 1187. The feast day of Saint Vitalis (April 28) holds civic significance, commemorating Vicenza's act of dedication to the Republic of Venice in 1404. This event led to a vow by the city rulers in the 16th century to hold an annual procession to San Vitale to renew the bond.

Stradella San Pietro'' is a short, narrow alley connecting the Piazza to ''Contrà Porta Padova''. A 1563 tax record cited by Lampertico refers to it using the archaic term ''viazzolla'' (small side street).

==== ''Contrà Sant'Andrea'' and ''Corte dei Roda'' ====
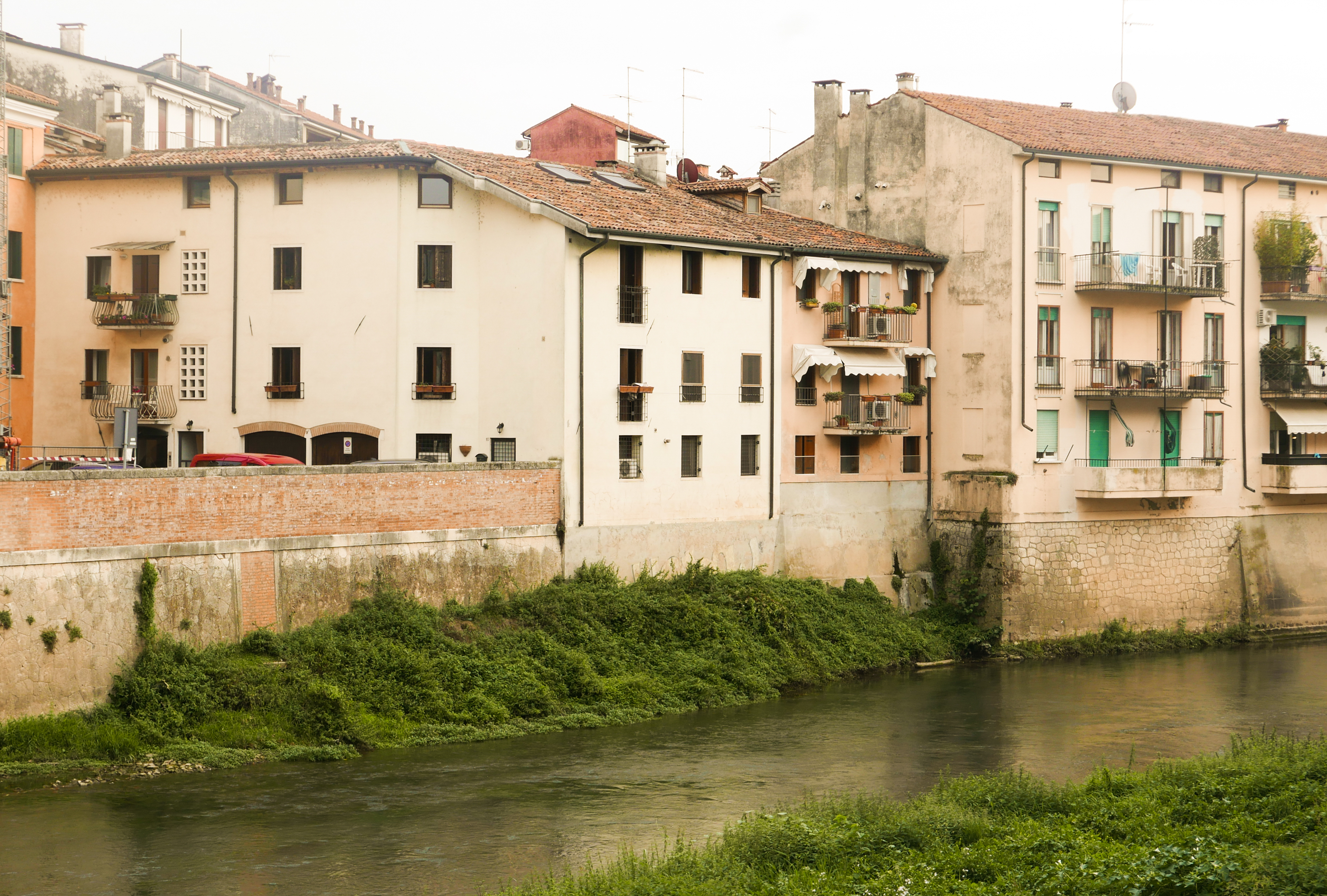
Along the Bacchiglione River and Corte dei Roda

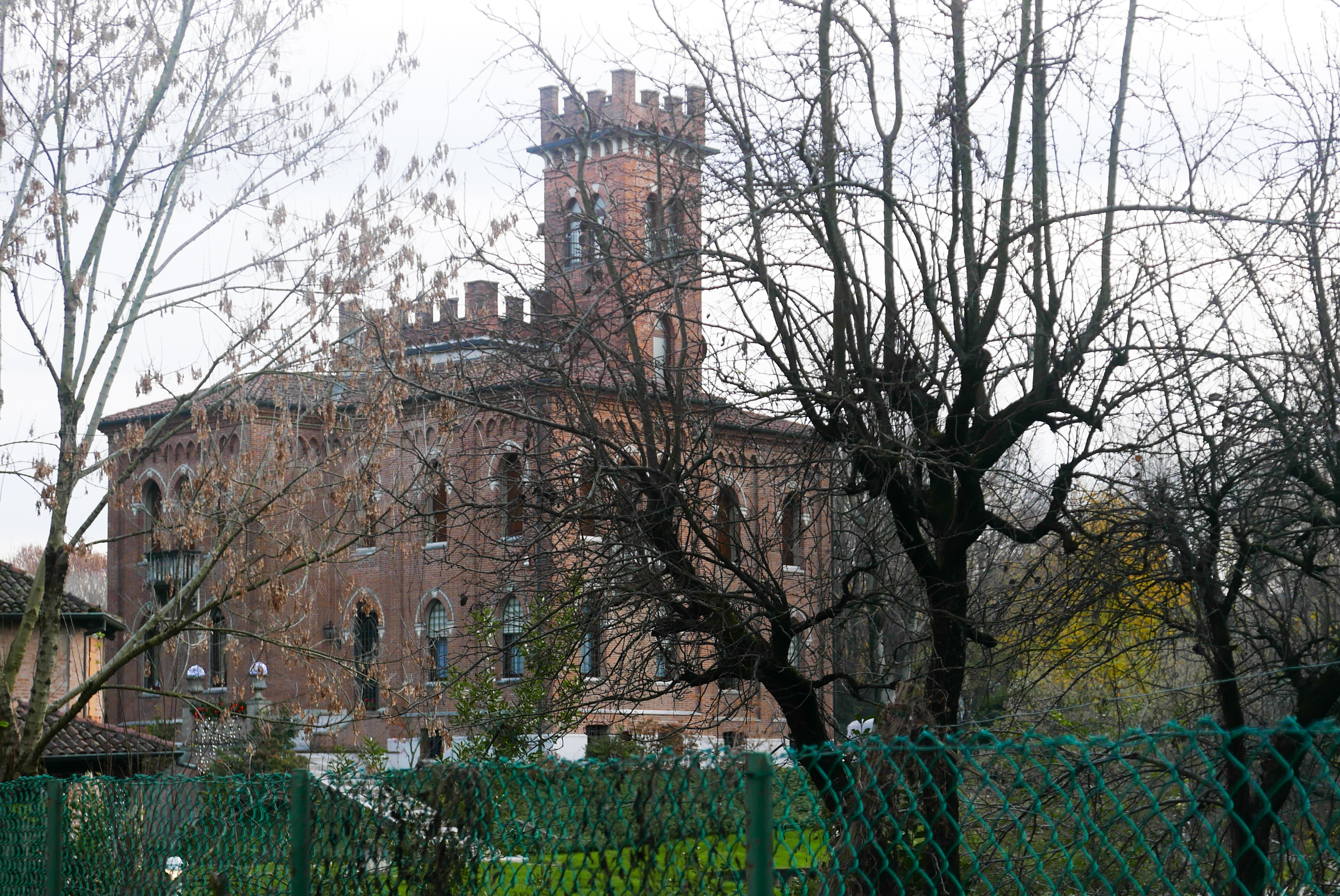
Villa Morseletto, nicknamed “the Castle”

Situated between ''Contrà San Pietro'' and the Bacchiglione riverbank, ''Contrà Sant'Andrea'' leads towards the ''Corte dei Roda''. This area was historically a center for activities reliant on the river, such as silk mills and tanneries. Until the 19th century, it featured tall buildings with characteristic rooftop lofts used for drying materials; it has since transitioned primarily into a residential complex.

About twenty meters along the ''contrada'', Via Nazario Sauro branches off to the left, leading towards the "Iron Bridge" (a pedestrian bridge built by the Piovene family in 1911 connecting to the opposite riverbank) before curving back to rejoin ''Contrà San Pietro''. Notable late 19th-century additions along Via Nazario Sauro include the Antonio Fogazzaro school building (now a municipal kindergarten) and several villas, such as Villa Salviati and the distinctively turreted Villa Morseletto (nicknamed "the castle"), set amongst mature trees.

- Contrà Sant'Andrea'' derives its name from the former church of Saint Andrew, which was under the jurisdiction of the San Pietro convent. Once serving as a parish church, it was requisitioned as barracks during the French occupation in 1797. Due to flood risks and the prominence of the nearby San Pietro parish church, it was never restored to religious use and was eventually demolished to make way for housing.
- Corte dei Roda'' is a courtyard accessed through a passageway under Casa Sesso, with another arched exit at its far end. Its name originates from the Rota (or Roda) family, merchants from Bergamo who settled in Vicenza in the mid-16th century. Giandomenico Scamozzi, father of the renowned architect Vincenzo, designed their house here, featuring a loggia facing the Bacchiglione. The family's coat of arms, a wheel (''rota''), adorns the entrance arch to the courtyard.
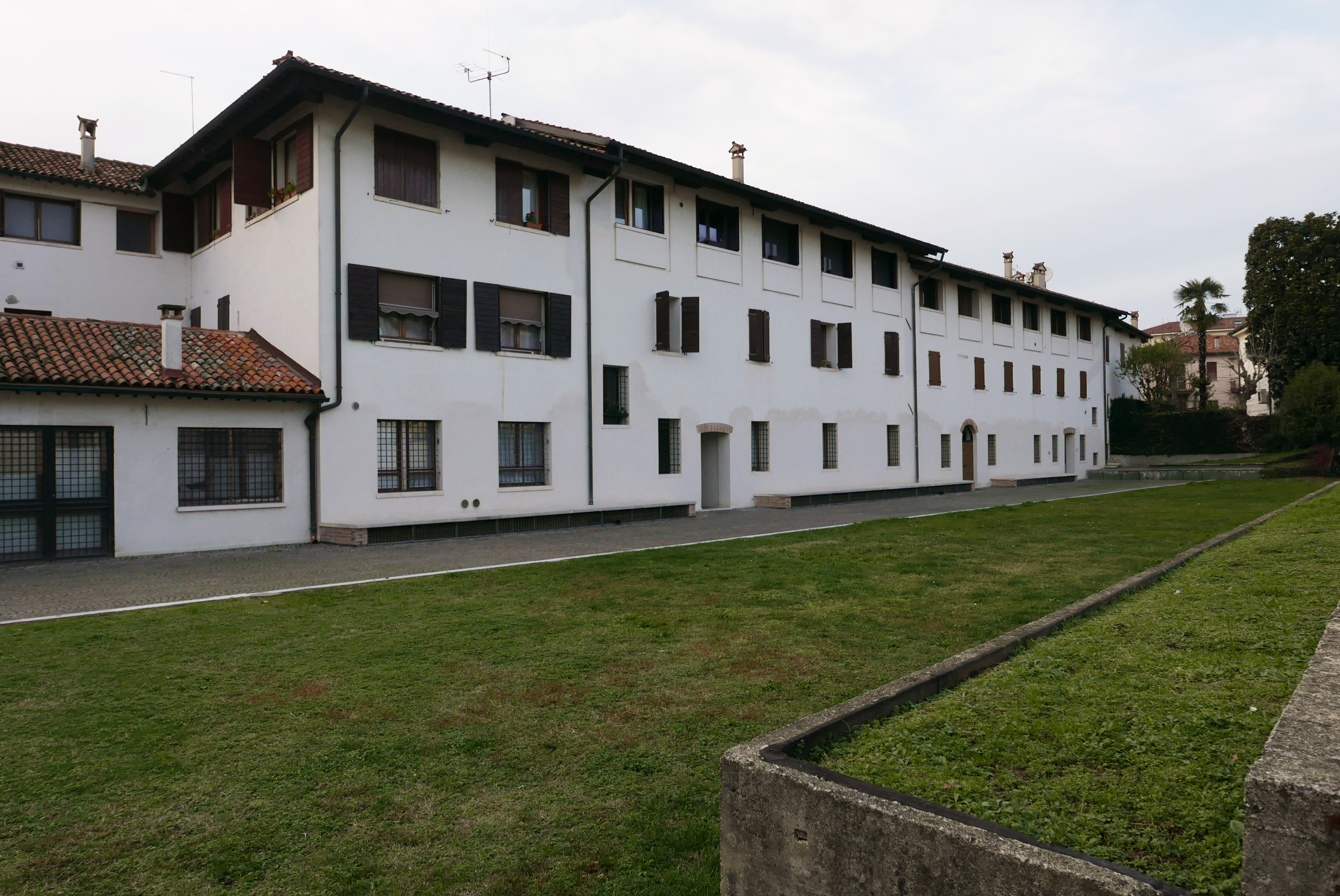
Detail of architecture in Corte dei Roda

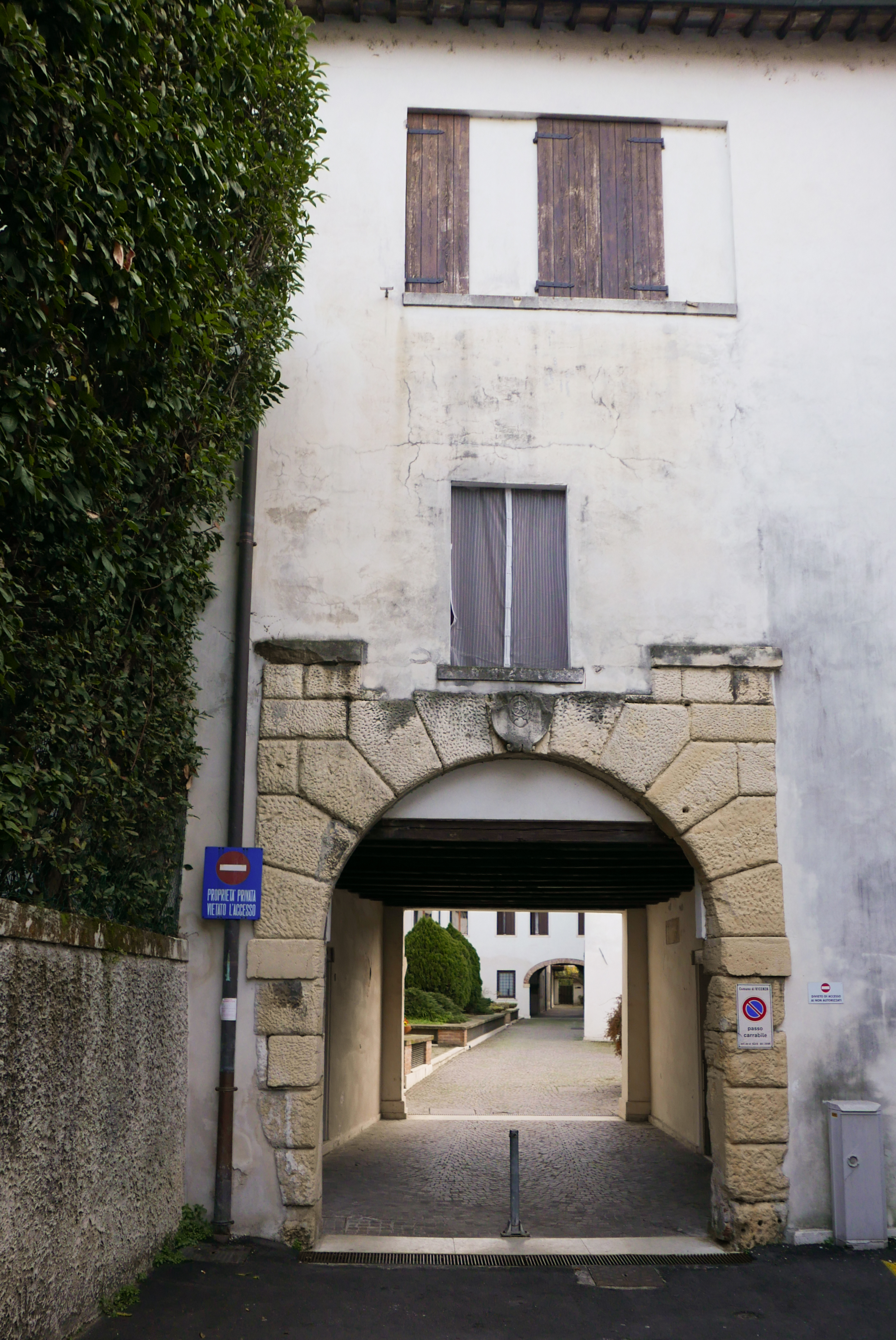
View within Corte dei Roda

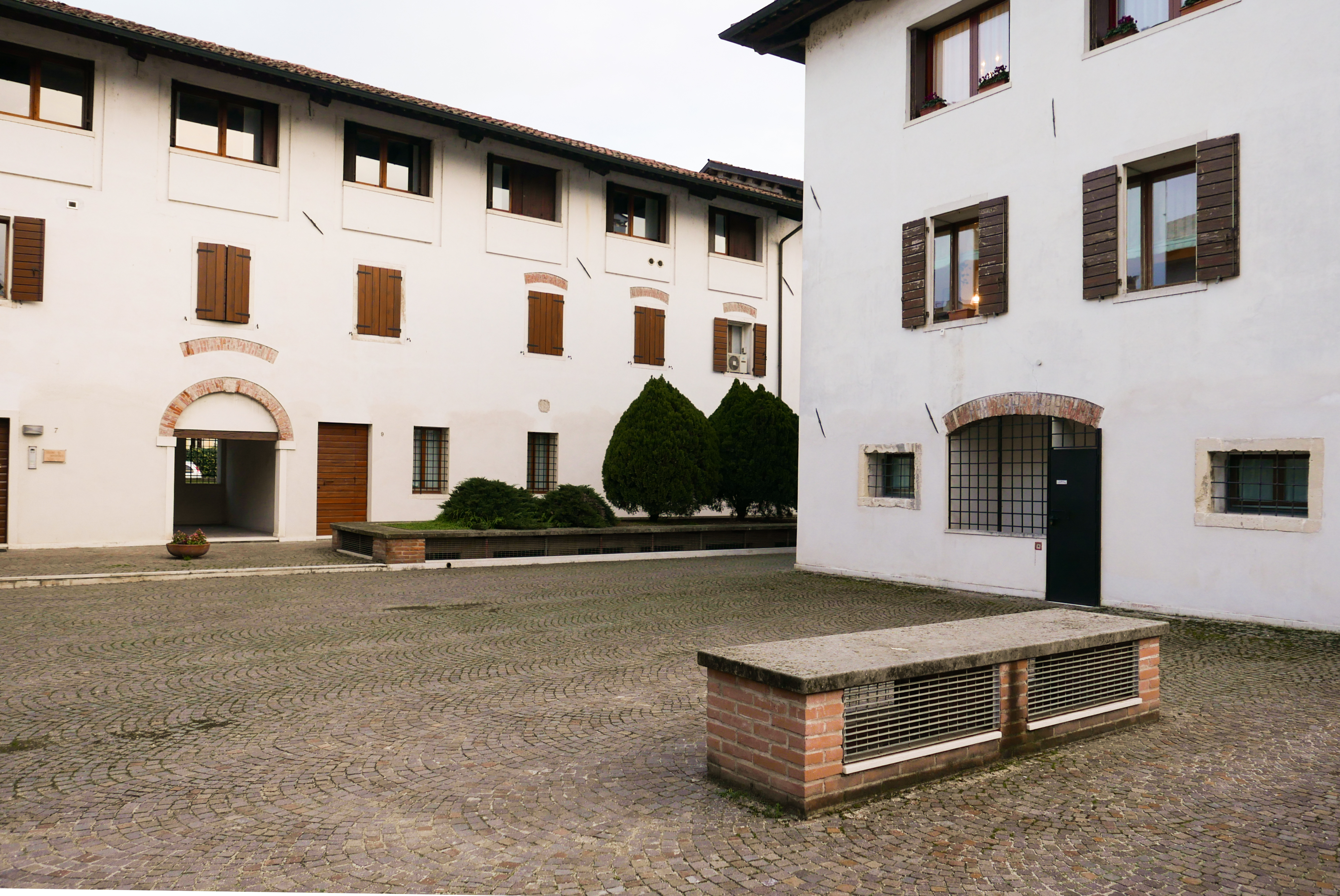
Buildings lining Corte dei Roda

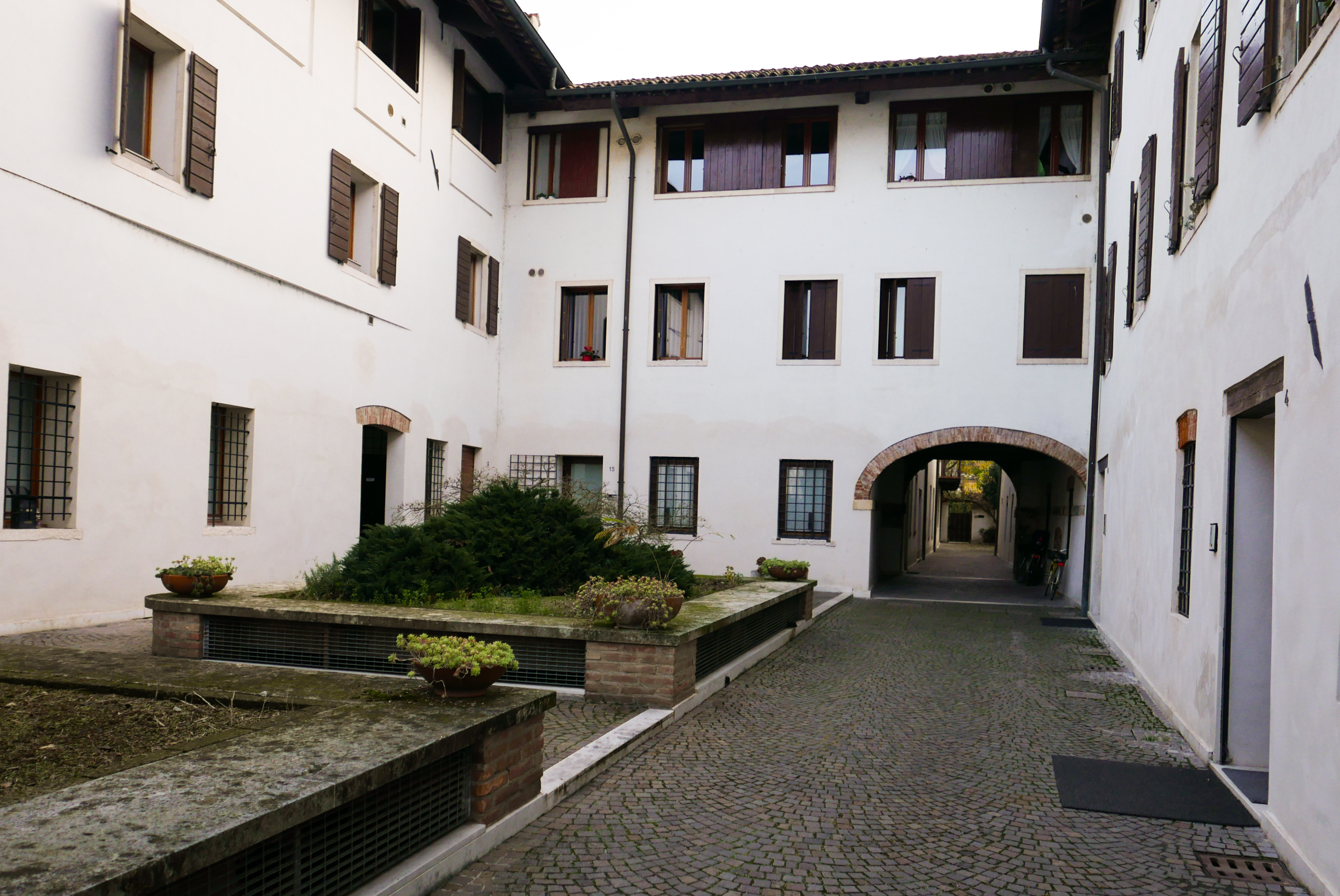
Detail of architecture in Corte dei Roda

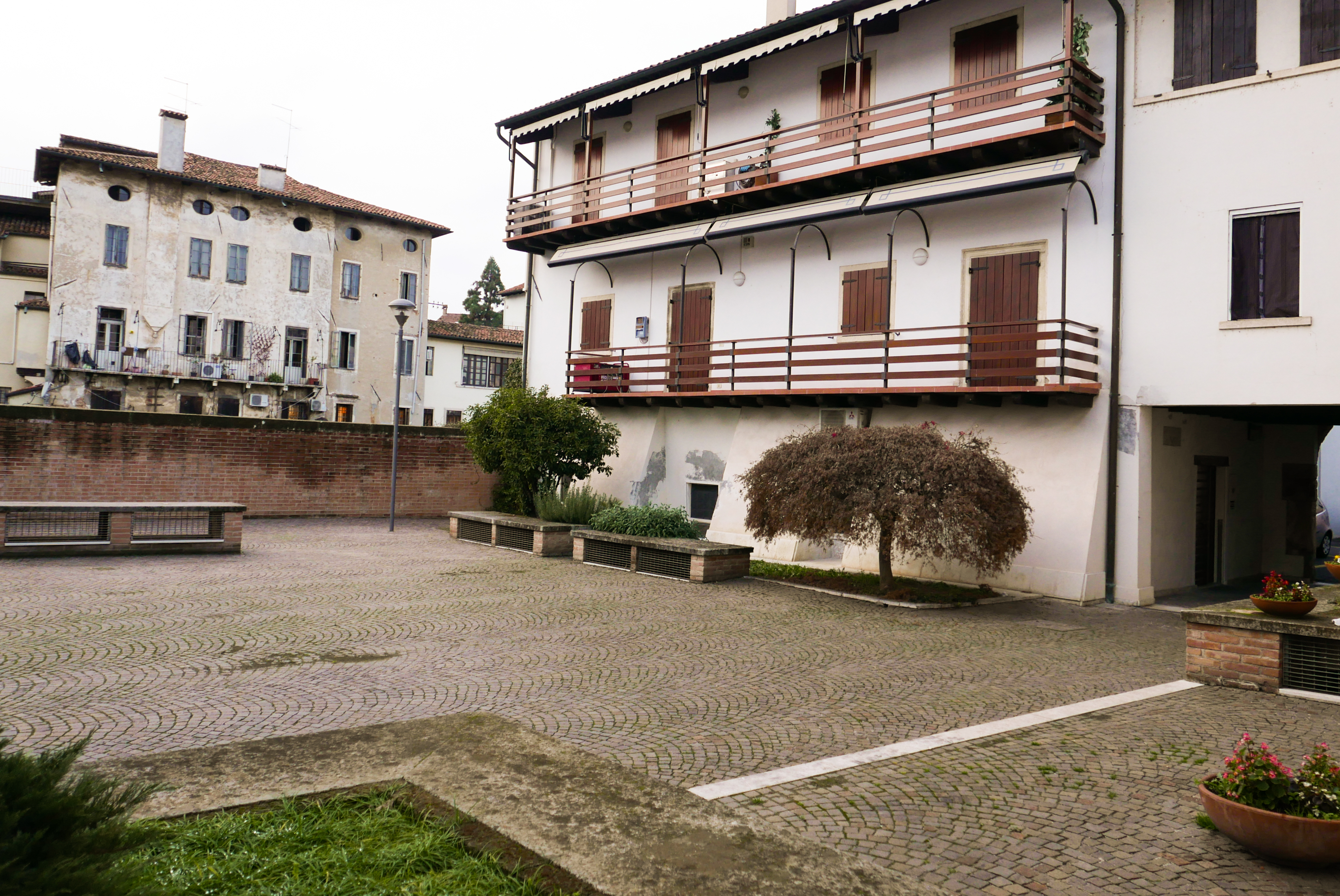
Detail of architecture in Corte dei Roda

== Notable sites ==
=== Churches and religious buildings ===
==== San Pietro Parish Church ====
The church originally belonged to the Abbey of San Pietro, Vicenza's oldest and most important Benedictine convent. After the suppression of the convent in 1810, the church was separated from the monastic complex (which became the Trento Institute), renovated, and designated as a parish church. The 15th-century nuns' choir, accessible from the cloister (now part of the Institute), remains a significant architectural feature.

==== Oratorio dei Boccalotti ====
Located in Piazzetta San Pietro, this small oratory dates to the early 15th century. It was built by the Confraternity of the Boccalotti (potters known for fine decorated ceramics), adjacent to their hospital near the San Pietro church and convent.

==== Chapel of Saint Maria Bertilla Boscardin ====
Located in ''Contrà San Domenico'', this chapel is annexed to the Motherhouse of the Sisters of St. Dorothy, Daughters of the Sacred Hearts.

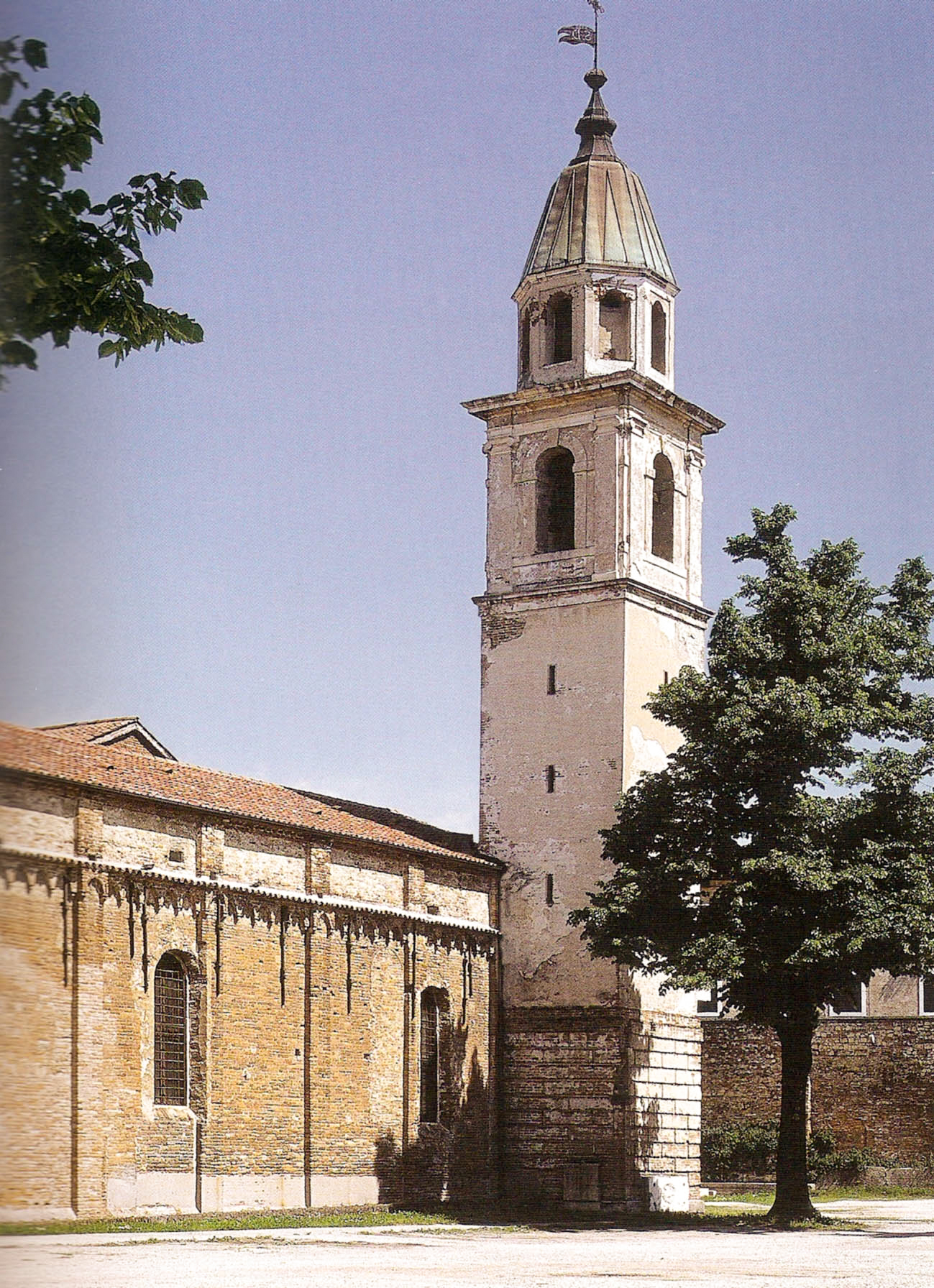
San Domenico church and bell tower

==== Former San Domenico Church ====
Located in ''Contrà San Domenico'' (historically ''Borgo delle Roblandine''), the church originated with a 13th-century Dominican convent. The Dominican nuns occupied the site until 1806. After various uses, including hospice and military occupation, the complex was acquired by the Society of St. Vincent de Paul and later became a municipal orphanage in 1875. Following restoration in 1998, the former convent now houses the Arrigo Pedrollo Conservatory of Music. The church building, significantly remodeled over centuries, retains artworks by Fogolino, Speranza, Alessandro Maganza, and sculptors Vendramin Mosca and Carlo Merlo.

==== Capuchin Oratory ====
Built in 1634 opposite the San Domenico church, this oratory houses a notable late 17th-century altarpiece depicting the Immaculate Conception by Padovanino, a follower of Titian.

==== Sacred Heart House ====
A spirituality center run by the Dorothean Sisters, offering spiritual retreats and educational programs, located between Corso Padova and ''Contrà Forti'' of Corso Padova.

=== Palaces ===
==== Palazzo Angaran ====
Located at the corner of Piazza XX Settembre and ''Contrà Santa Lucia'', this significant Renaissance palace marks the entrance to the district from the Ponte degli Angeli.

==== Thiene Houses ====
Located in ''Contrà Porta Santa Lucia'', this complex features a notable courtyard portal dating from the early 1440s, sometimes tentatively attributed to Palladio.

==== Palazzo Regaù ====
A prominent example of Venetian late-Gothic architecture located on ''Contrà XX Settembre''. It served as a public dormitory in the late 19th century before recent restoration.

==== Palazzo Franco ====
Situated at the intersection of ''Contrà XX Settembre'', ''Contrà San Domenico'', and ''Contrà Porta Padova'', this palace was built in 1830 based on a design by Antonio Piovene.

==== Palazzo Bonaguro ====
A neoclassical building facing Piazza XX Settembre, situated between ''Contrà Santa Lucia'' and Via IV Novembre. It was designed by Francesco Zigiotti in 1796.

==== Palazzo Belisario ====
Located in ''Contrà Santa Lucia'' at the corner with ''Stradella dei Orbi''. Built in 1773 for a wealthy silk merchant, it features a relief above the door depicting the Byzantine general Belisarius. The legend of Belisarius being blinded and forced to beg has led to speculation that ''Stradella dei Orbi'' (Lane of the Blind) was named after him, but this is unfounded; the name is plural (''Orbi''), not singular (''Orbo''), and likely refers to actual blind residents or beggars.

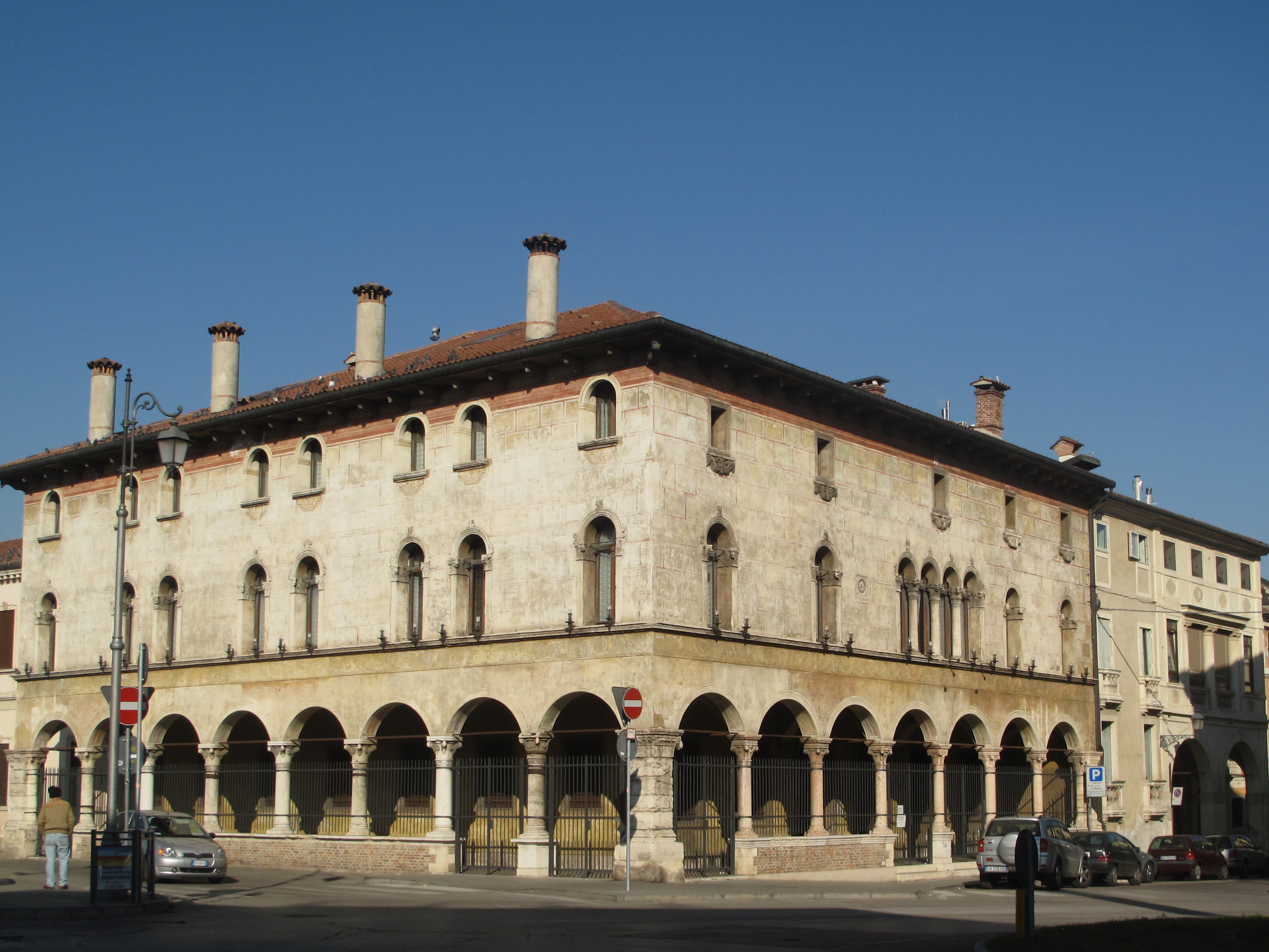
Palazzo Angaran

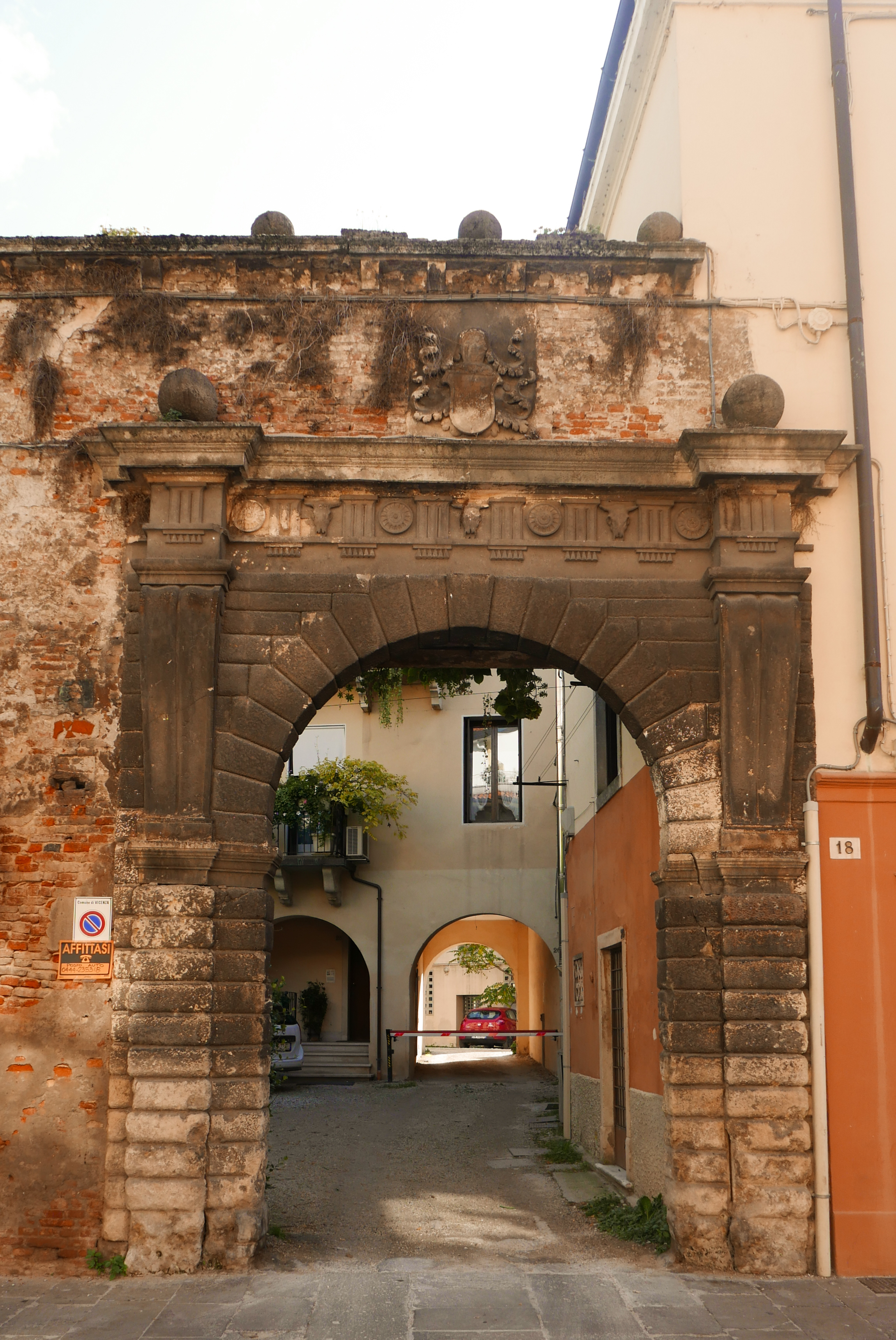
Portal of the Thiene Houses

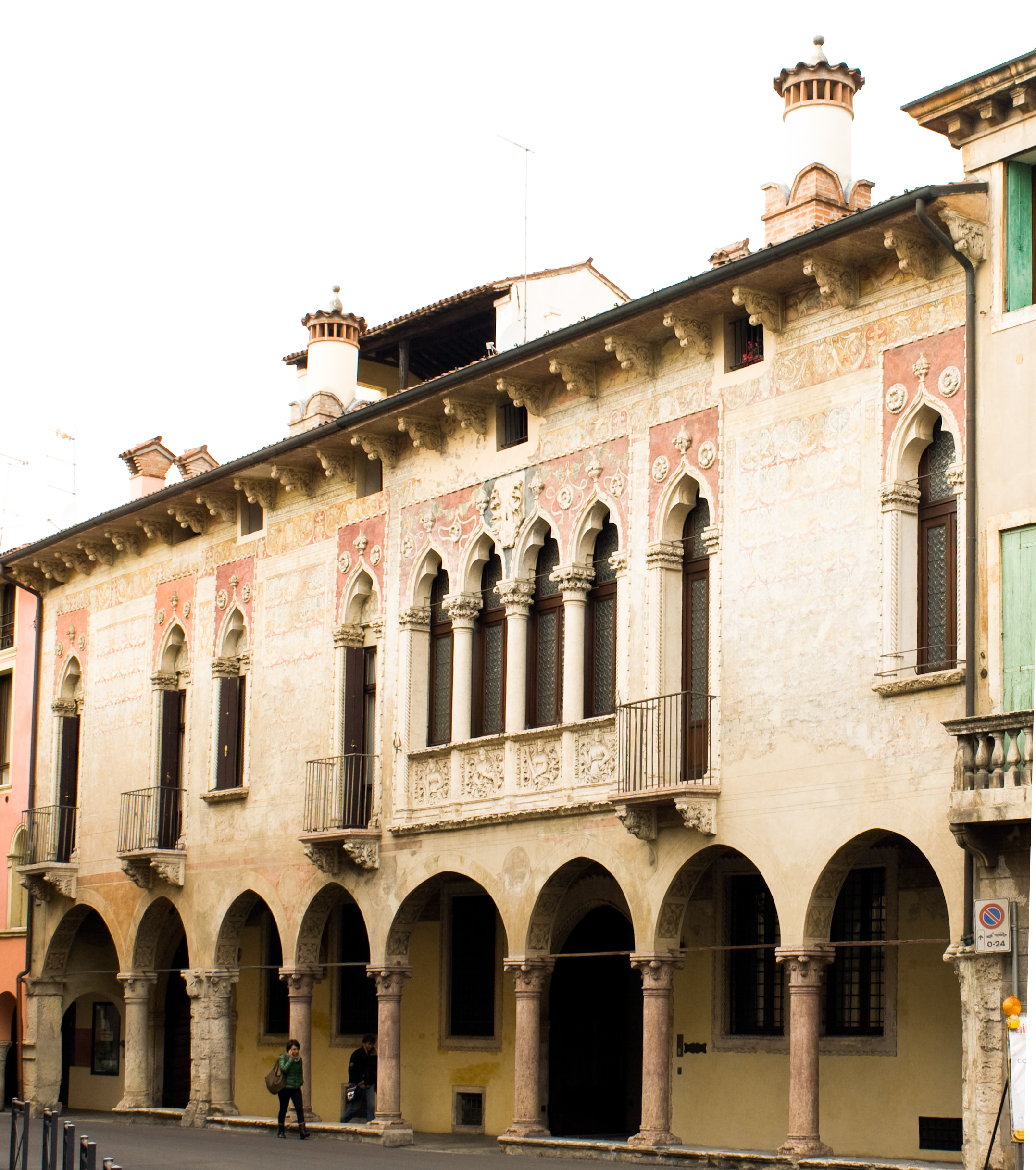
Palazzo Regaù

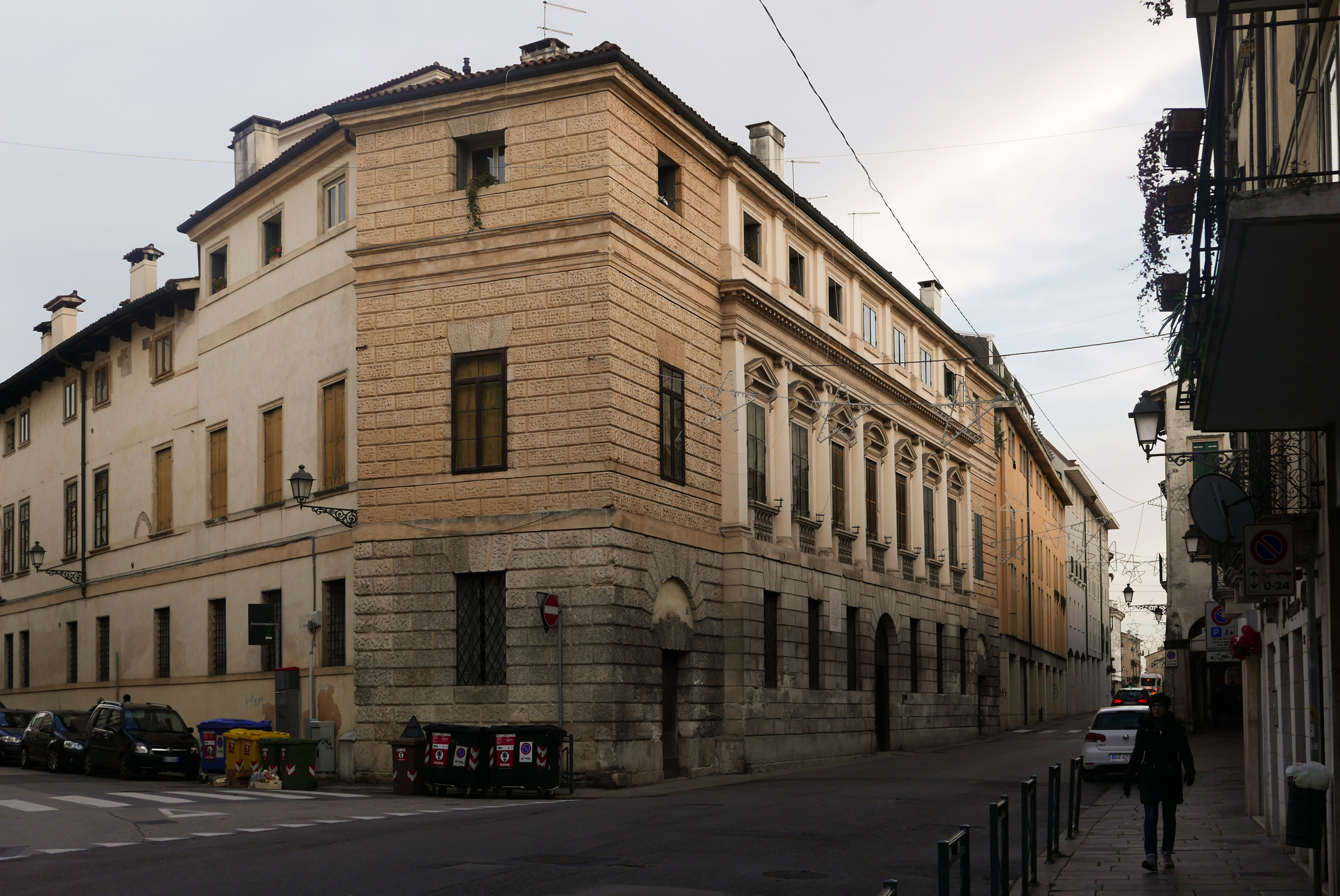
Palazzo Franco

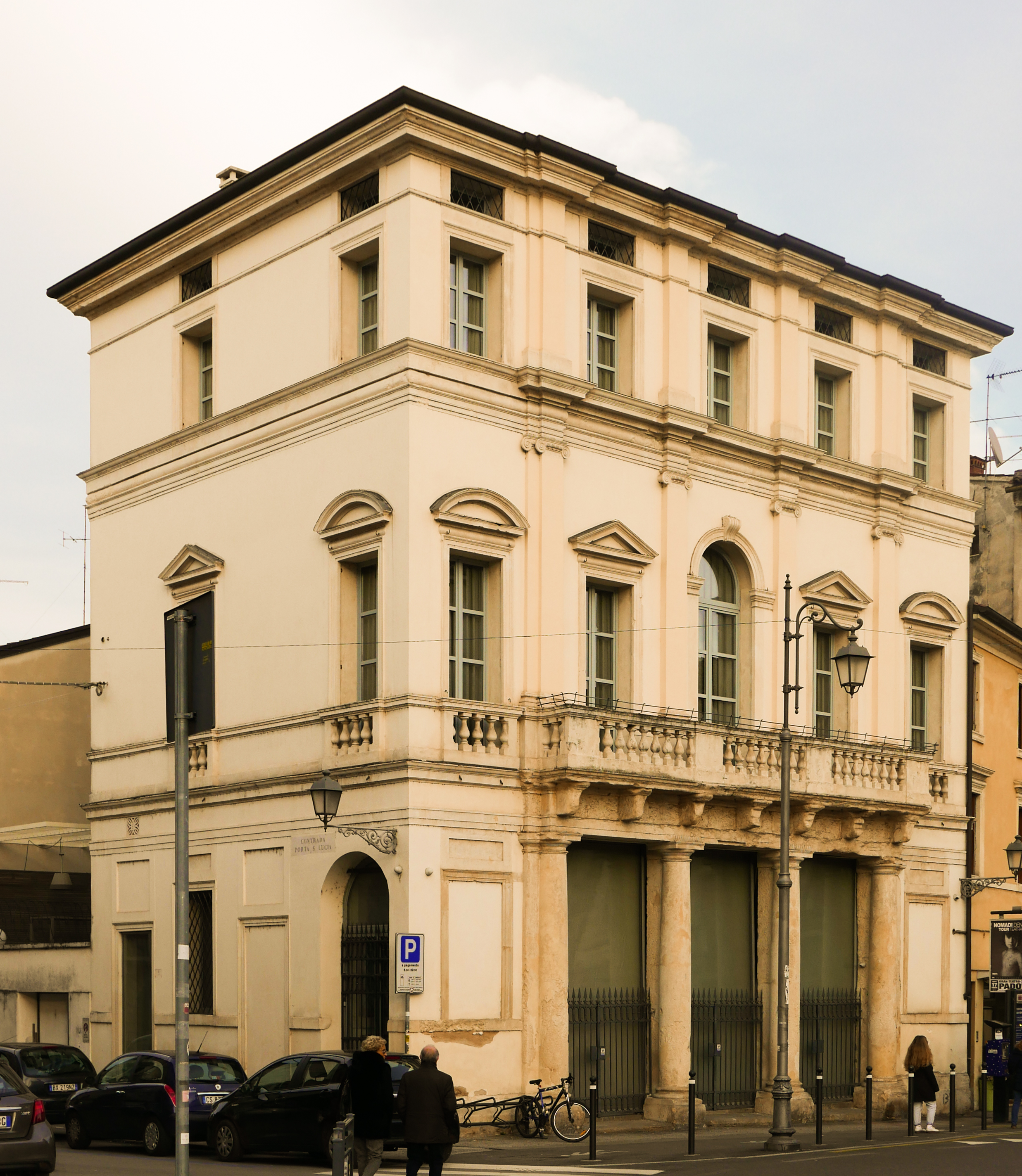
Palazzo Bonaguro

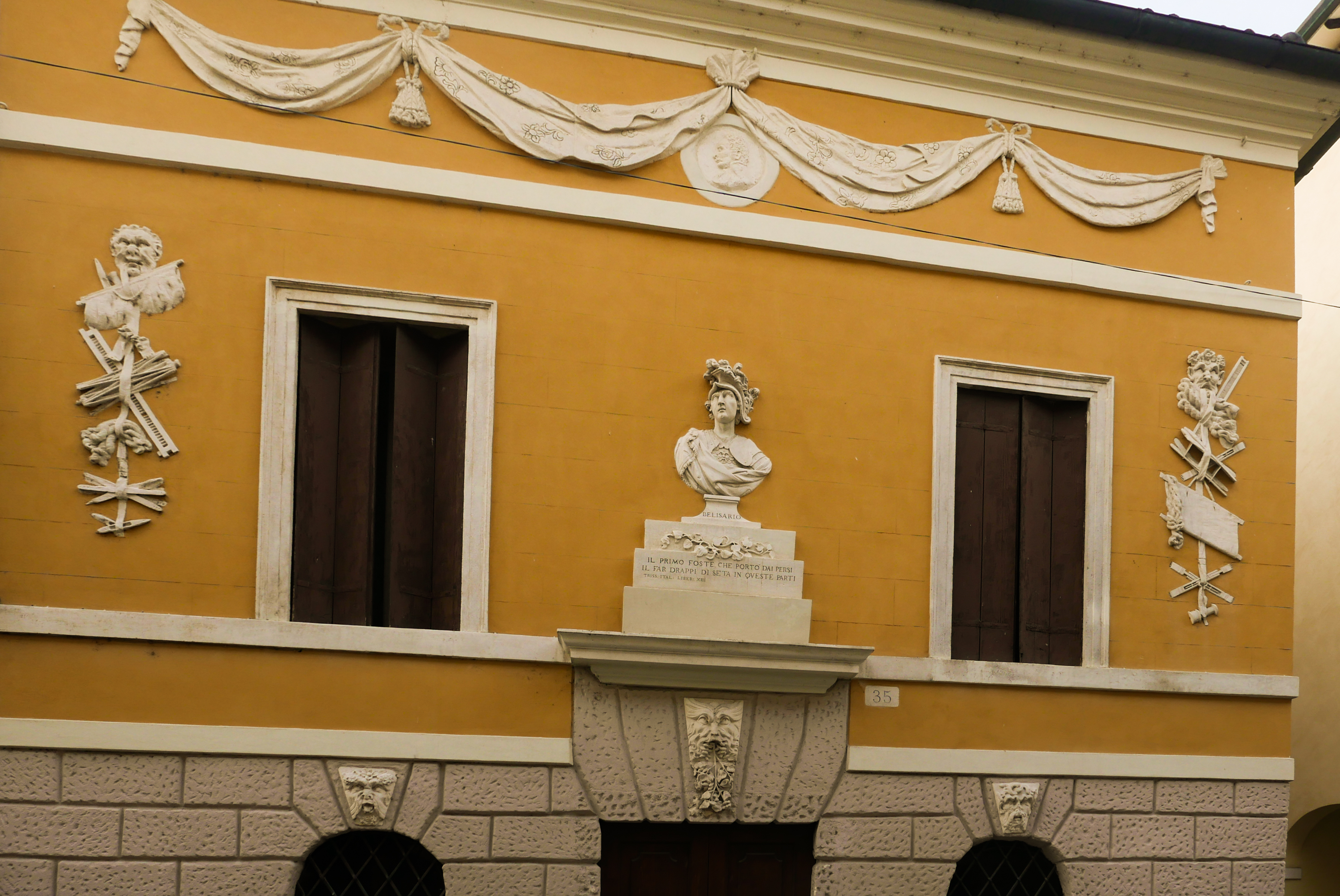
Palazzo Belisario

=== Bridges ===
==== Ponte degli Angeli ====
Likely Vicenza's oldest bridge crossing, originating from the Roman era where the Via Postumia crossed the river (then the Astico, later Bacchiglione) at the eastern end of the city's decumanus maximus. In the Middle Ages, it was named after the nearby San Pietro Monastery. The original Roman bridge had a different orientation and three arches; a fourth was added in 1570 based on a Palladio design. The name Ponte degli Angeli became common in modern times, referencing the former church of Santa Maria degli Angeli near its western end. Destroyed by the 1882 flood, it was rebuilt in iron with a slightly different alignment. Becoming inadequate for traffic, the iron bridge was demolished in 1950 and replaced by the current wider, straighter reinforced concrete structure.

==== Iron Bridge ====
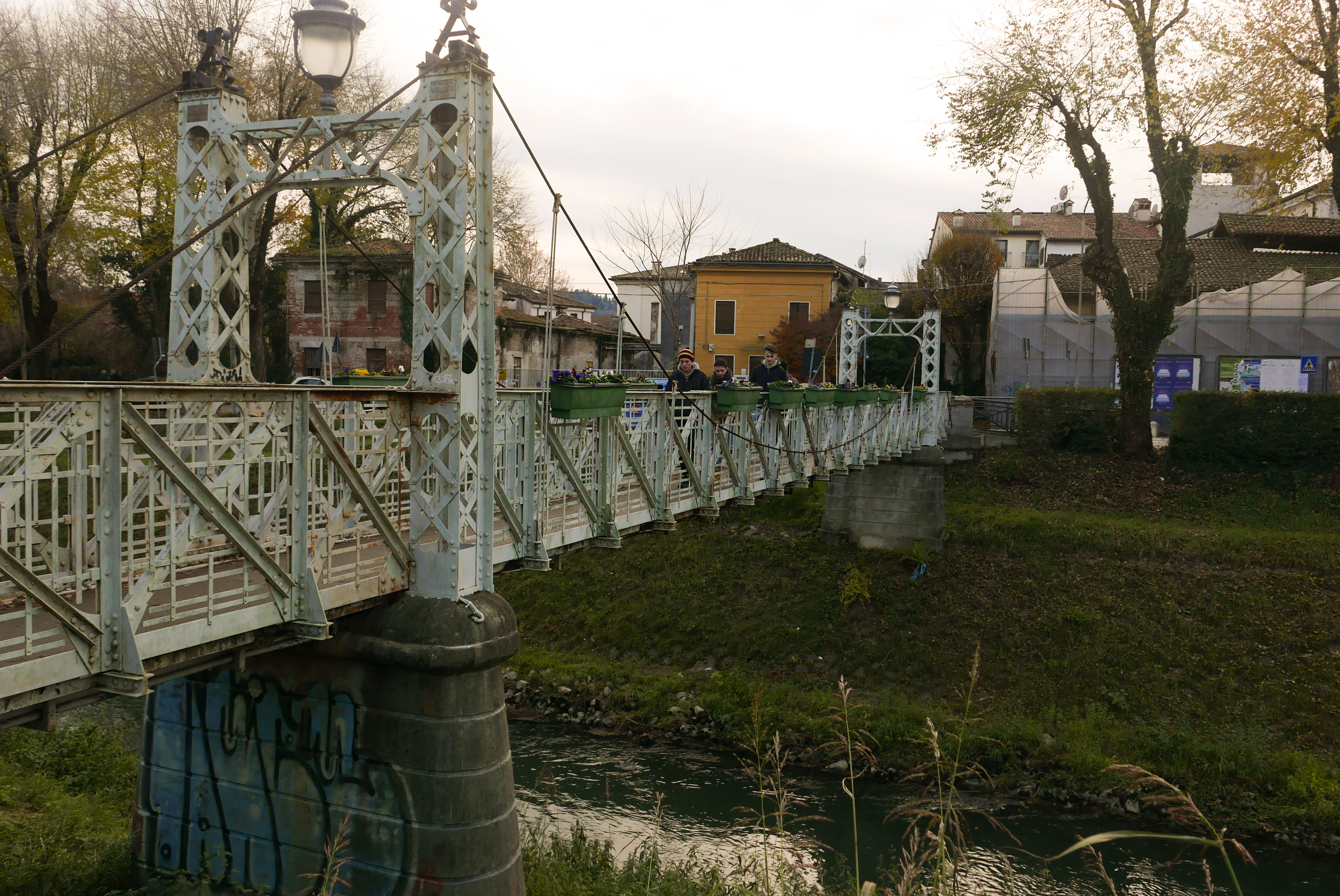
Iron Bridge over the Bacchiglione

This pedestrian bridge (''Ponte di Ferro'') connects the left bank (at Via Nazario Sauro) with the right bank (Viale Giuriolo) across the branch of the Bacchiglione created in 1876. A plaque states: "Andrea and Cesare Piovene built this iron bridge in 1911, later made public".

==== Bridge of the Bankrupts ====
Historically, Corte dei Roda on the left bank was connected directly to Piazza dell'Isola on the right bank by a simple wooden bridge known as the "bridge of the bankrupts" (''ponte dei falliti''). Residents of ''Contrà San Pietro'' maintained this bridge, which was crucial for their access to the city center, as evidenced by their petitions to municipal authorities (''Deputati ad utilia'') for repair assistance.

=== Educational and cultural institutions ===
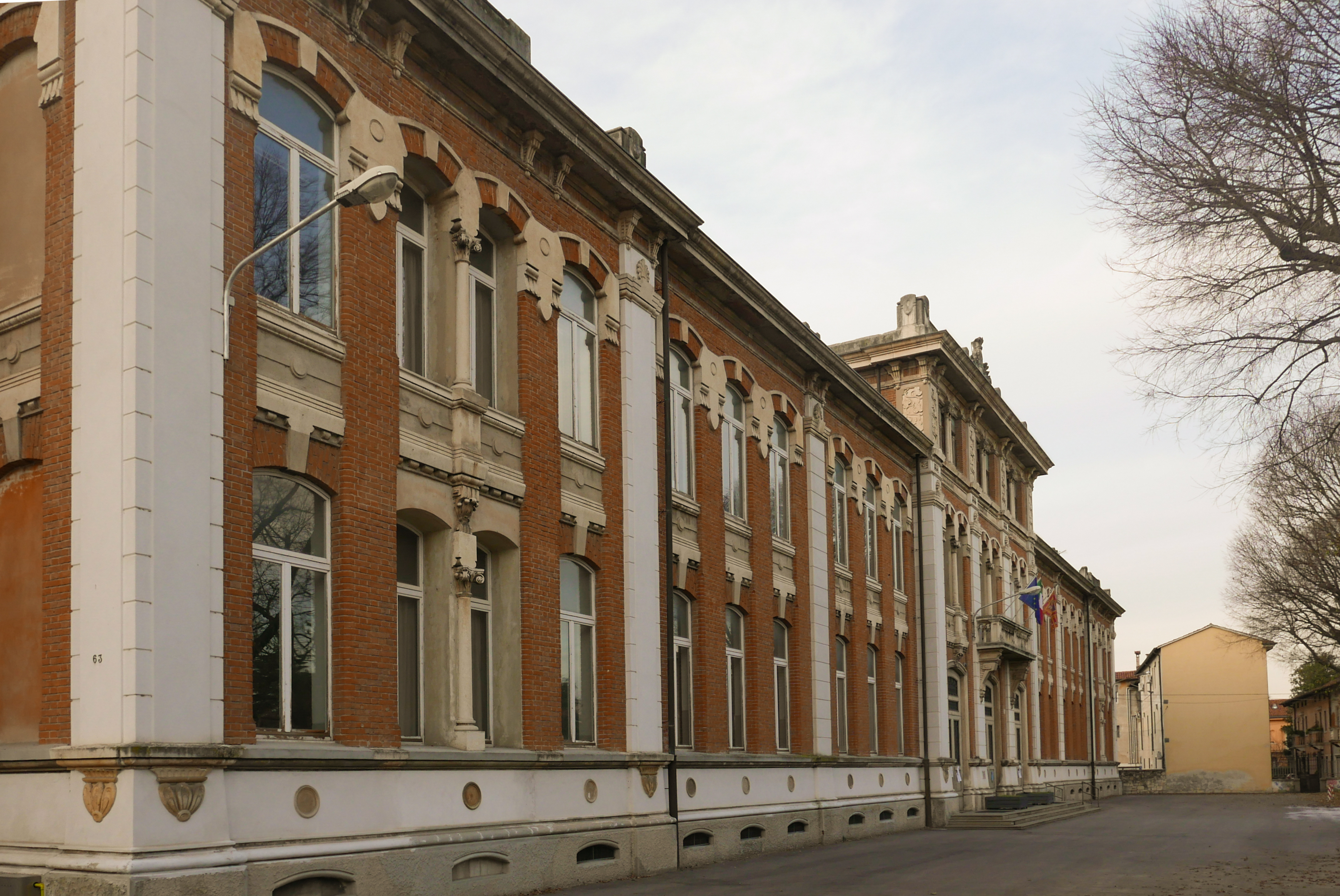
“Giacomo Zanella” Primary School at Porta Padova

The district currently hosts the following educational and cultural institutions:

==== Municipal-Ipab Company Nursery ====
Located at the Salvi Institute, Corso Padova.

==== Antonio Fogazzaro Municipal Kindergarten ====
Located on Via Nazario Sauro.

==== “Giacomo Zanella” Municipal Primary School ====
Located on ''Contrà Porta Padova''.

==== G.A. Farina Comprehensive Institute (Private) ====
Includes nursery, primary, secondary, and high school levels, located on Via IV Novembre.

==== Arrigo Pedrollo Conservatory ====
Housed in the former San Domenico convent complex on ''Contrà San Domenico''.

=== Health and social institutions ===
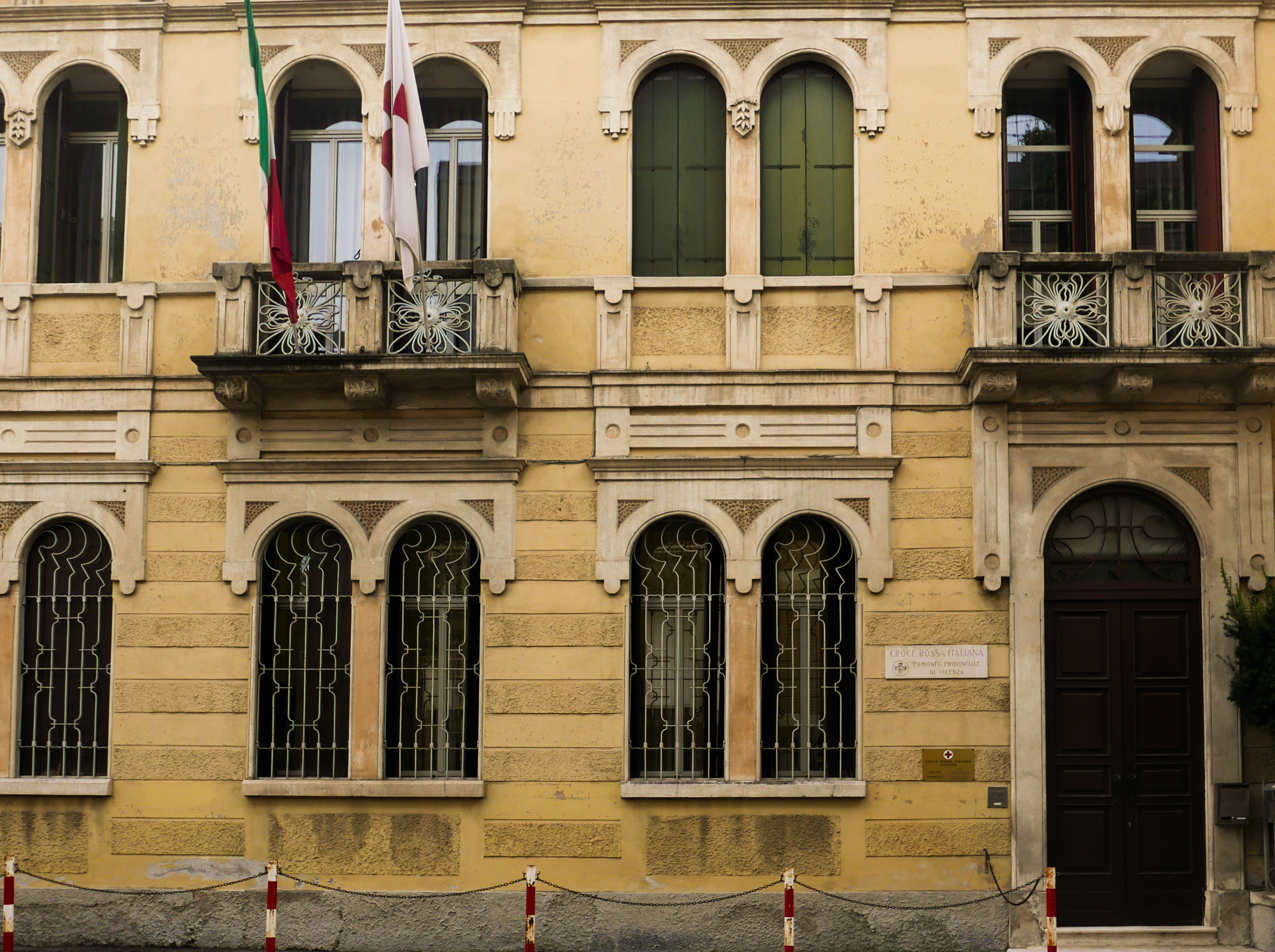
Italian Red Cross headquarters in Contrà Torretti

The district is home to important health services, including administrative centers for much of the Vicenza area.

Italian Red Cross
A historical institution that manages health and social activities to support marginalized people or those in emergency situations. It is located in Contrà Torretti.

Santa Lucia Local Multispecialty Facility
Contrà Mure Santa Lucia

Public Health Service (SISP) and Prevention Department
The mission of the Prevention Department is to promote the protection of public health, the prevention of diseases and the improvement of the quality of life through knowledge and management of health risks in the living and working environment. Both services are located in the former INPS building, in Stile Littorio, in Via IV Novembre.

Local Addiction Service (SerD)
Focused on the prevention, treatment and rehabilitation of drug and alcohol addiction, near the end of Contrà San Domenico.

=== Welfare institutions ===
==== “Casa Provvidenza” Rest Home ====
Run since 1935 by the "Sisters of Charity of Saints Bartolomea Capitanio and Vincenza Gerosa", known as the "Sisters of Maria Bambina", it houses elderly women and offers them rest and care. Located in Contrà San Domenico 26, near the Capuchin Chapel.

==== Diocesan Caritas ====
A pastoral organization for Christian communities, based in Contrà Torretti, which runs the adjacent Casa San Martino night shelter for the homeless.

==== Institute of the Sisters of the Poor ====
The Institute runs a shelter in Contrà Santa Lucia for people helping relatives in hospital.

== See also ==
- History of religious life in Vicenza

== Bibliography ==
- Various authors (1997). Chiesa di San Pietro in Vicenza – Storia, fede, arte [Church of San Pietro in Vicenza – History, faith, art] (in Italian). Vicenza: Tipografia U.T.VI.
- Barbieri, Franco (2011). Vicenza: la cinta murata, 'Forma urbis' [Vicenza: The Walled Enclosure, 'Urban Form'] (in Italian). Vicenza: Ufficio UNESCO del Comune di Vicenza. ISBN 978-88-900990-7-6.
- Barbieri, Franco; Cevese, Renato (2004). Vicenza, ritratto di una città [Vicenza, Portrait of a City] (in Italian). Vicenza: Angelo Colla editore. ISBN 88-900990-7-0.
- Castellini, Silvestro (1822). Storia della città di Vicenza, ove si vedono i fatti e le guerre de' vicentini così esterne come civili, dall'origine di essa città sino all'anno 1630 [History of the City of Vicenza, Wherein Are Seen the Deeds and Wars of the Vicentines, Both External and Civil, from the City’s Origin to 1630] (in Italian). [n.p.]
- Franzina, Emilio (2003). Biografia di un quartiere. Il Trastevere di Vicenza (1981-1925) [Biography of a District: Vicenza’s Trastevere (1981-1925)] (in Italian). Vicenza: Libreria G. Traverso editore.
- Giarolli, Giambattista (1955). Vicenza nella sua toponomastica stradale [Vicenza in Its Street Toponymy] (in Italian). Vicenza: Scuola Tip. San Gaetano.
- Mantese, Giovanni (1954a). Memorie storiche della Chiesa vicentina, II, Dal Mille al Milletrecento [Historical Memories of the Vicentine Church, II, From 1000 to 1300] (in Italian). Vicenza: Accademia Olimpica.
- Mantese, Giovanni (1958). Memorie storiche della Chiesa vicentina, III/1, Il Trecento [Historical Memories of the Vicentine Church, III/1, The 14th Century] (in Italian). Vicenza: Accademia Olimpica.
- Mantese, Giovanni (1964). Memorie storiche della Chiesa vicentina, III/2, Dal 1404 al 1563 [Historical Memories of the Vicentine Church, III/2, From 1404 to 1563] (in Italian). Vicenza: Neri Pozza editore.
- Mantese, Giovanni (1954b). Memorie storiche della Chiesa vicentina, VI, Dal Risorgimento ai nostri giorni [Historical Memories of the Vicentine Church, VI, From the Risorgimento to Our Days] (in Italian). Vicenza: Scuola Tip. San Gaetano.
- Reato, Ermenegildo (2004). Reato, Ermenegildo (ed.). La carità a Vicenza: le opere e i giorni [Charity in Vicenza: The Works and the Days] (in Italian). Vicenza: IPAB Proti-Salvi-Trento di Vicenza.
- Soragni, Ugo (1988). "Architettura e città dall'Ottocento al nuovo secolo: palladianisti e ingegneri (1848-1915)" [Architecture and the City from the 19th Century to the New Century: Palladianists and Engineers (1848-1915)]. Storia di Vicenza, Vol. IV/2, L'Età contemporanea (in Italian). Vicenza: Neri Pozza editore.
- Sottani, Natalino (2012). Antica idrografia vicentina. Storia, evidenze, ipotesi [Ancient Vicentine Hydrography: History, Evidence, Hypotheses] (in Italian). Vicenza: Accademia Olimpica.
