= History of Vicenza =

History of Italian municipality

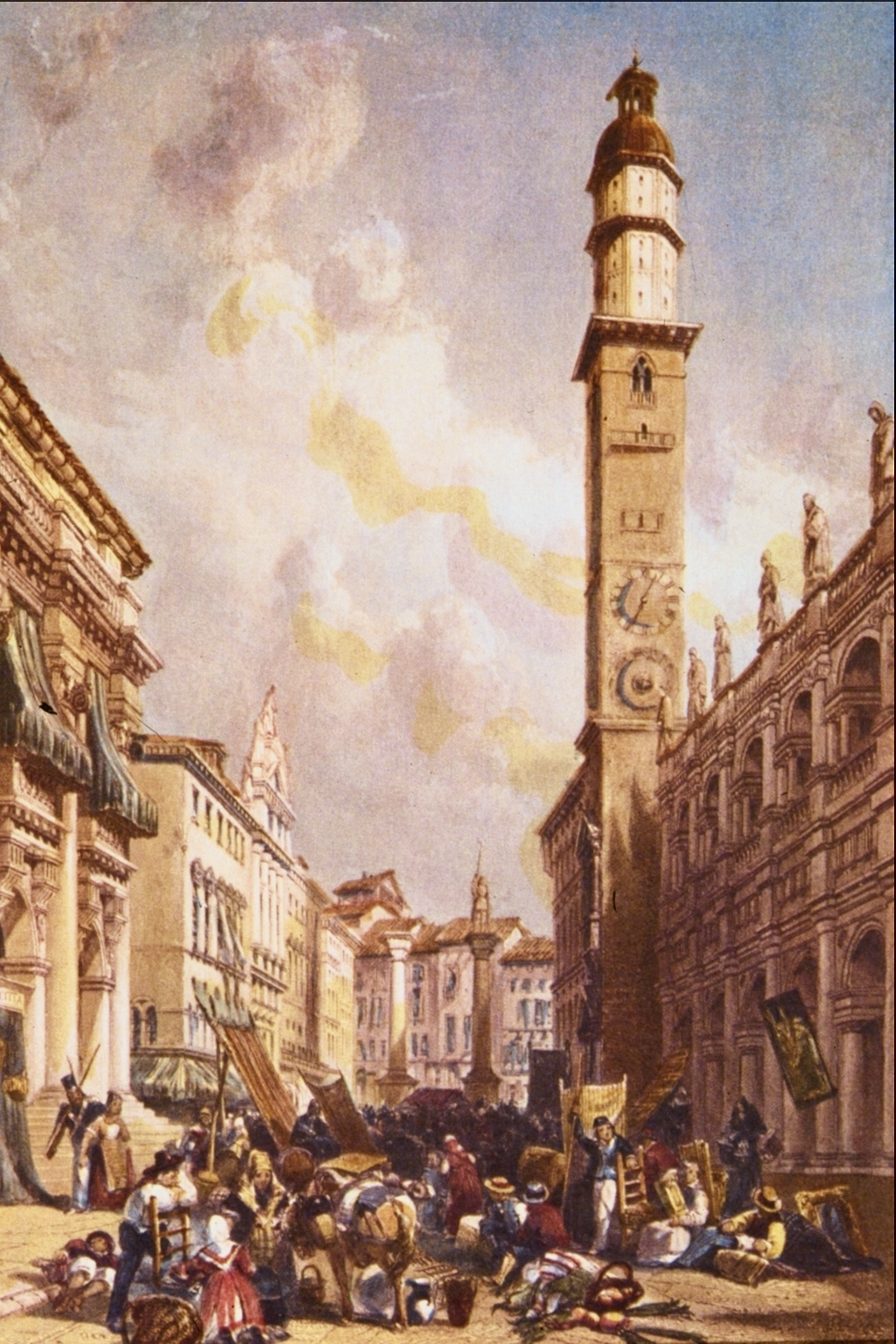
Piazza dei Signori in Vicenza, depicted by the English painter James Duffield Harding (before 1863)

The city of Vicenza boasts a history spanning over 2,000 years.

== Documentation and historiography ==
Written documentation concerning the city of Vicenza from ancient times and the first millennium is virtually nonexistent. The ecclesiastical and civic archives of the city contain only a copy of a clearly forged document from the Nonantola Abbey and another recording a privilege granted by Bishop Rodolfo to the Benedictine monastery of Saints Felix and Fortunatus. Additional sparse information can be gleaned from the account of Paul the Deacon and occasional references to the Vicentine territory found in Paduan or Veronese documents. Archaeological finds are also limited—except for those related to the city during the Roman Empire—though sufficient to confirm, even in the Early Middle Ages, the presence and continuity of a medium-sized city in the Venetian Plain.

In contrast, the second millennium provides an abundance of documents and monumental structures, revealing the life of a city that, except for brief periods, was always subject to external powers but rich in history, art, culture, and illustrious figures.

From the 12th century onward, valuable documents have been found in the Diocesan Capitular Archive and at the Benedictine monasteries of Saints Felix and Fortunatus and Saint Peter, mostly concerning privileges, rights and exemptions, disputes over property or income, and deeds of transfer. These have enabled the reconstruction of many aspects of political, social, and religious life, as well as territorial maps.

During the Late Middle Ages, chronicles began to emerge, the first being that of Gerardo Maurisio, who described in detail the events in Vicenza between 1183 and 1237. It was followed by the chronicle of Nicolò Smereglo, covering events from 1200 to 1312, that of Ferreto dei Ferreti, detailing occurrences in Vicenza and Padua between 1250 and 1318, and those of Antonio Godi and Conforto da Costozza, the latter providing a chronicle spanning 17 years. The first to compile a comprehensive chronicle of the city of Vicenza was Giambattista Pagliarino, who lived in the second half of the 15th century and drew on many earlier documents.

Efforts to write the history of Vicenza began in the 16th century. The first—albeit modest—historian was Giacomo Marzari, who published a small compendium of Vicentine civil and ecclesiastical history. He was followed by Silvestro Castellini, who compiled a more thorough and comprehensive work, and Francesco Barbarano, who lived in the 17th century. Writing in an era before historical criticism had matured, their works are often imprecise, making it difficult to distinguish between history and legend.

With the great revival of historical studies in the 18th century, Vicenza saw the remarkable 13-volume work of Fortunato Vigna, who drew on thousands of documents from civil and ecclesiastical archives. Other collectors of documents and writers included Paolo Calvi, Giambattista Verci, Tomaso Faccioli, and Gaetano Maccà, who wrote the Storia del territorio vicentino.

== Ancient era ==
=== The pre-Roman settlement ===
It seems likely that the first settlement on the small group of hills—formed by alluvial debris and sediments emerging from the marshy plain at the confluence of the Astico and Retrone rivers—originated as early as the 6th century BC.

Strabo suggests that the inhabitants of the site belonged to the Euganei population, but modern scholars largely agree that they were Veneti, as evidenced by the discovery of over 200 votive tablets dedicated to the Venetic goddess Reitia and an inscription in the Venetic language, found in 1959 during the construction of a building opposite the Palazzo Trissino municipal headquarters. The possibility that they belonged to Gallic or Celtic tribes is ruled out. Pliny the Elder in the 1st century AD also mentions Vicenza in his Naturalis Historia as a center of Venetic foundation, a non-native Indo-European population.

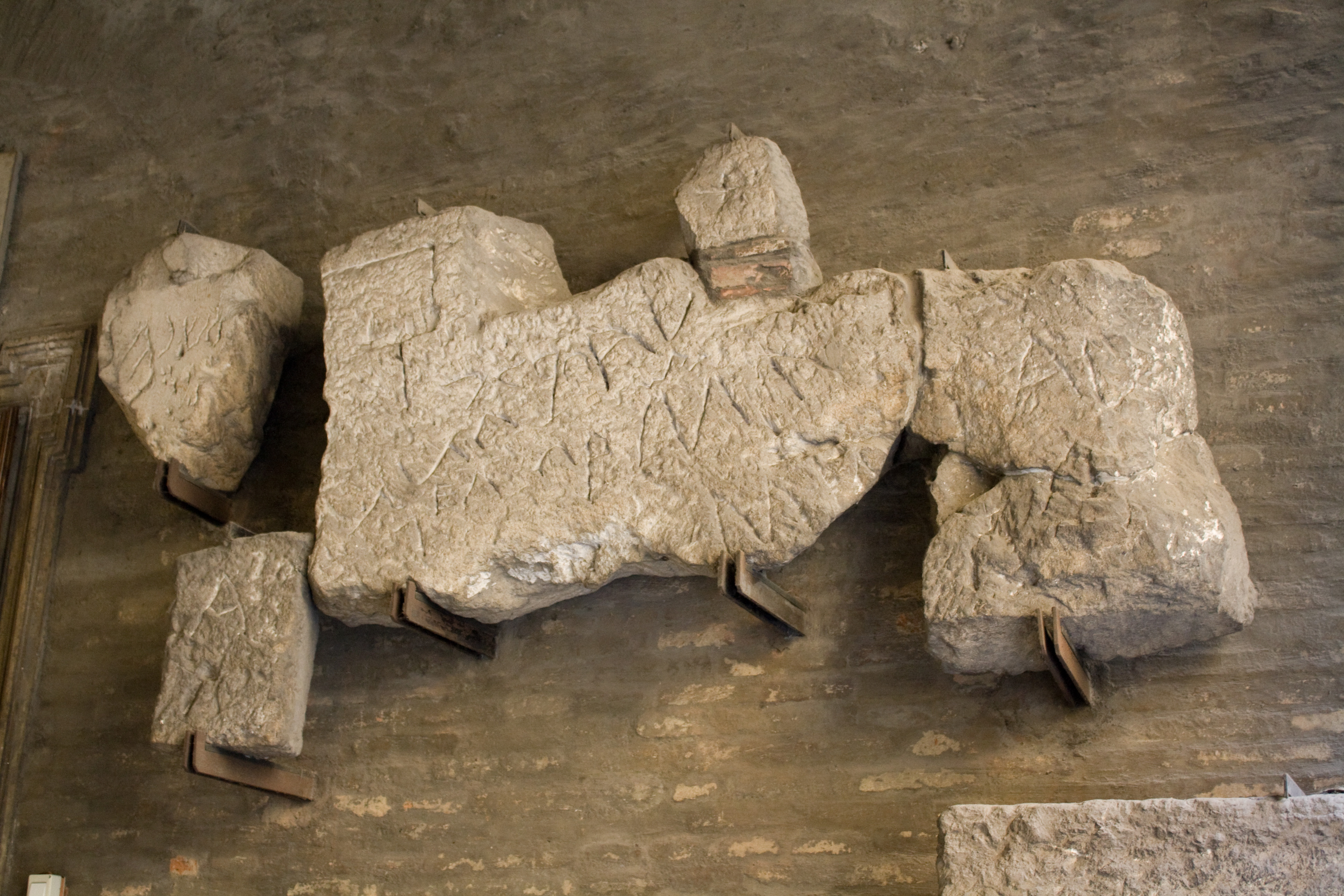
Venetic inscription on stone, displayed in the atrium of the Palazzo da Schio (Ca' d'Oro)

Little is known about the events or political developments that affected the city in pre-Roman or even Roman times, except that the settlement existed and developed, leaving a clear urban layout. Few artifacts remain: for twenty centuries, the city has grown upon itself without interruption, and each era has destroyed what was built before, often reusing spaces and materials. Additionally, the fact that the city is currently inhabited prevents extensive excavations and research.

From the history of Rome, it can be inferred that, like other Veneti, the inhabitants of what would later be called Vicetia (likely from vicus) were initially influenced culturally by surrounding peoples: primarily the Etruscans, from whom the Veneti inherited fashion, art and writing, followed by the Cenomani and the Cimbri, but without being subjugated by them.

When the Romans appeared in the Po and Venetian plains—which they called Cisalpine Gaul—the Veneti became their loyal allies, fighting alongside them against the Gauls, whom they defeated in 222 BC at the Battle of Clastidium. They remained faithful allies during the Social Wars, and as a reward, they first received Latin rights under the Lex Pompeia de Transpadanis in 89 BC, then full Roman citizenship.

Roman influence and authority were felt in the Venetian plain at least from the mid-2nd century BC. In 148 BC, the Via Postumia was constructed, stretching from Genua to Aquileia, facilitating trade and the rapid movement of legions. Regarding Vicenza, a milestone preserved in Verona testifies that a Roman magistrate was called to settle a boundary dispute between Vicenza and Este.

=== Roman Vicetia ===
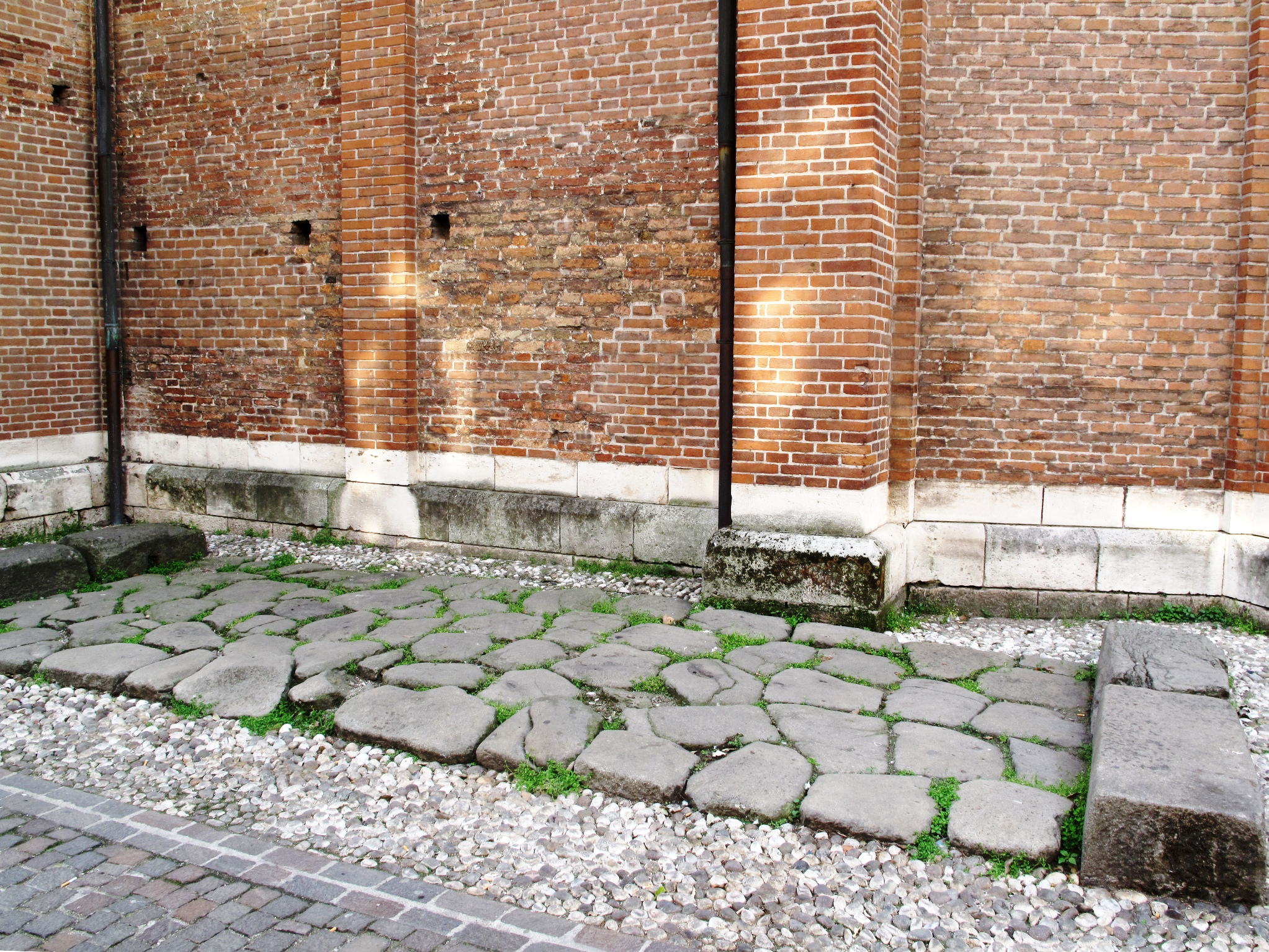
Section of a Roman road (one of the minor cardines) uncovered in Corso Fogazzaro. Paved with polygonal basalt slabs, with traces of cart traffic.

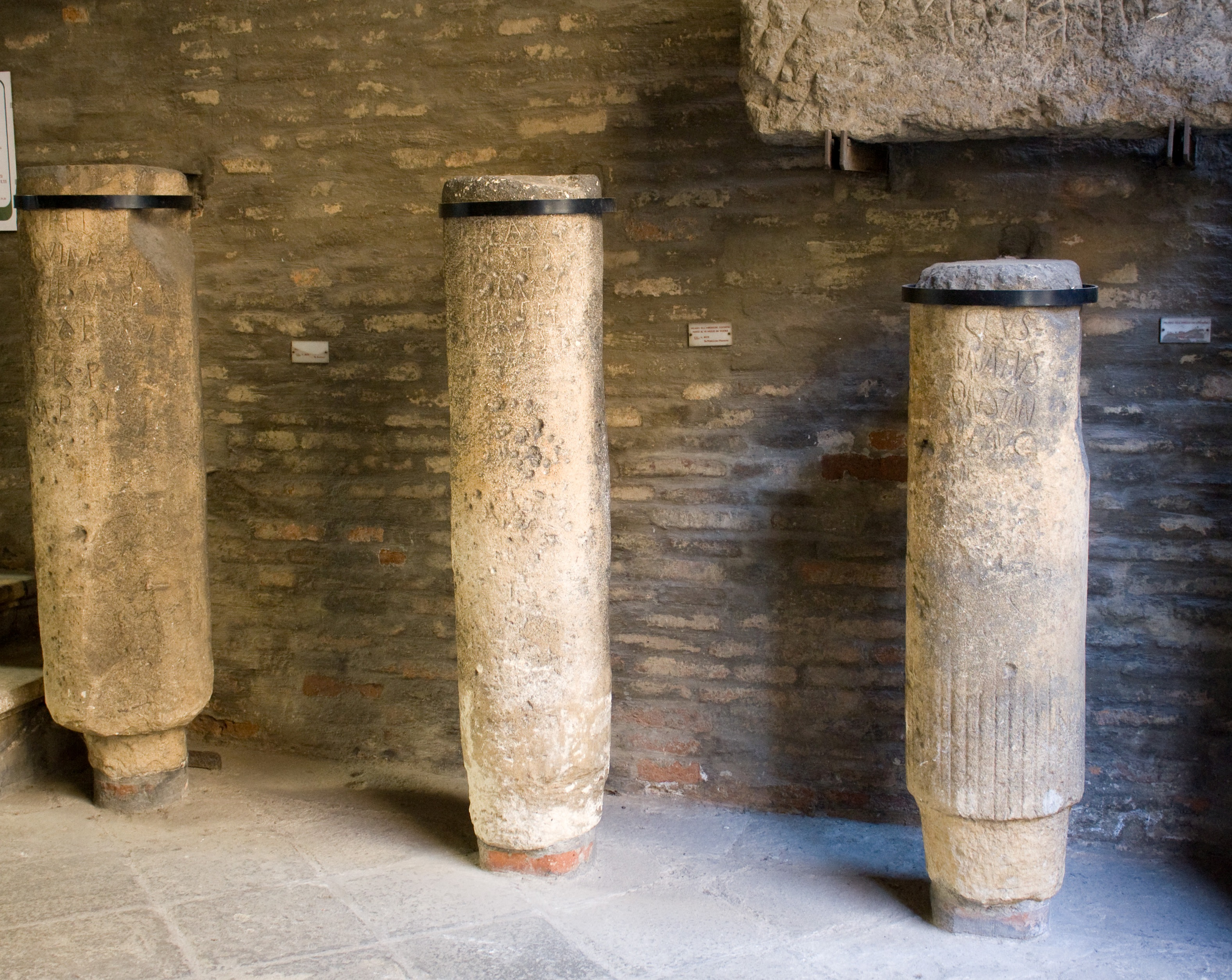
Roman milestones, found on roads outside the city, displayed in the atrium of the Palazzo da Schio (Ca' d'Oro)

Like other Venetic cities, during Caesar's civil war, Vicenza likely sided with Caesar and, as a reward, between 49 and 42 BC, became a Roman municipium optimo iure, with full civil and political rights: as an unconquered city, it retained its own magistrates. During this period, the settlement was restructured according to a relatively orthogonal urban layout, wooden dwellings were replaced with stone or brick constructions, and the first walls were built.

These walls, as in other similar cities, were erected to delineate urban from rural space and to confer prestige to the new status of a Roman city, at a time when the entire region was pacified and defenses seemed unnecessary: from the victory over the Cimbri in the 2nd century BC until the 2nd century AD, Veneto saw no further barbarian incursions. In the absence of significant remains, it is presumed that the walls were only partially constructed, particularly on the western side, while the city was naturally defended by rivers on the other sides.

Like other Venetic cities, Vicenza was incorporated by Augustus into the Regio X (Venetia et Histria, as designated by Diocletian).

Compared to the current city’s extent, the Roman settlement was modest, roughly corresponding to the historic center in the strict sense: to the west, it began at the current Porta Castello; to the north, at the intersection of Contrà Porti-Apolloni-Pedemuro San Biagio; to the east, at the start of Corso Palladio from Piazza Matteotti; and to the south, where Contrà della Pescheria and Contrà di San Paolo meet. It was bordered on three sides by rivers, the Astico (now Bacchiglione) and the Retrone, crossed by two stone-arched bridges—described and drawn by Palladio—corresponding to the current Ponte degli Angeli and Ponte San Paolo, replaced by modern structures in the second half of the 19th century.

The urban layout of Roman cities was based on a grid of parallel east-west streets, the decumani, intersecting orthogonally with north-south streets, the cardines. The urban restructuring of Vicenza in the mid-1st century BC had to account for the pre-existing layout, leading to adaptations: the intersections between decumani and cardines were not strictly orthogonal but oblique.

At the center of the main streets, the decumanus maximus—roughly corresponding to the current Corso Palladio—formed the urban segment of the Via Postumia, which, to the east, crossed the Astico via a bridge and continued toward Aquileia, while to the west, it passed through the gate later called Porta Feliciana and then Porta Castello, continuing toward Verona. It was wide enough to allow two-way cart traffic.

The identification of the cardo maximus is more debated, generally thought to be the road that, crossing the current Ponte San Paolo, passed under the Basilica Palladiana, continued through Contrà del Monte and Contrà Porti to the Ponte Pusterla, which did not exist at the time, as beyond the Astico lay a vast lake. For this reason, some believe the cardo maximus was instead the road that, ascending from the current Contrà Cordenons and Contrà Cesare Battisti, ran along Corso Fogazzaro and continued outside the city toward the mountains, skirting the western edge of the lacus Postierlae.

Near the intersection of the two main streets—under Palazzo Trissino Baston and the western part of Piazza dei Signori—a section of the Forum’s pavement was uncovered, the multifunctional center of civic life, which, following the Roman model, featured monumental structures. It had a north-south orientation: a raised sacred area with temples north of the decumanus and a lower, paved area with large rectangular stones, still visible under the palace, dedicated to politics and commerce south of the road; the Forum was completed by a civil basilica on the site where the Palatium vetus and later the Basilica were built—hence named by Palladio.

Beneath the Cathedral of Santa Maria Annunciata, remains of decorated domus and Roman roads are preserved and visible, along with the well-preserved cryptoporticus under Piazza del Duomo, part of a patrician domus. It is believed that other cryptoportici existed in the city—built to level the naturally uneven terrain and support garden terraces—and baths, of which fragments remain in Contrà Pescherie Vecchie.

From the locality of Villaraspa (Motta di Costabissara), an aqueduct began, passing through the locality of Lobia, 3 km north of the historic center, where remains of supporting arches still stand, and running through the current Viale Ferrarin, Via Brotton, and Corso Fogazzaro, bringing spring water to the city, ending in the castellum aquae, the reservoir at Mure San Lorenzo.

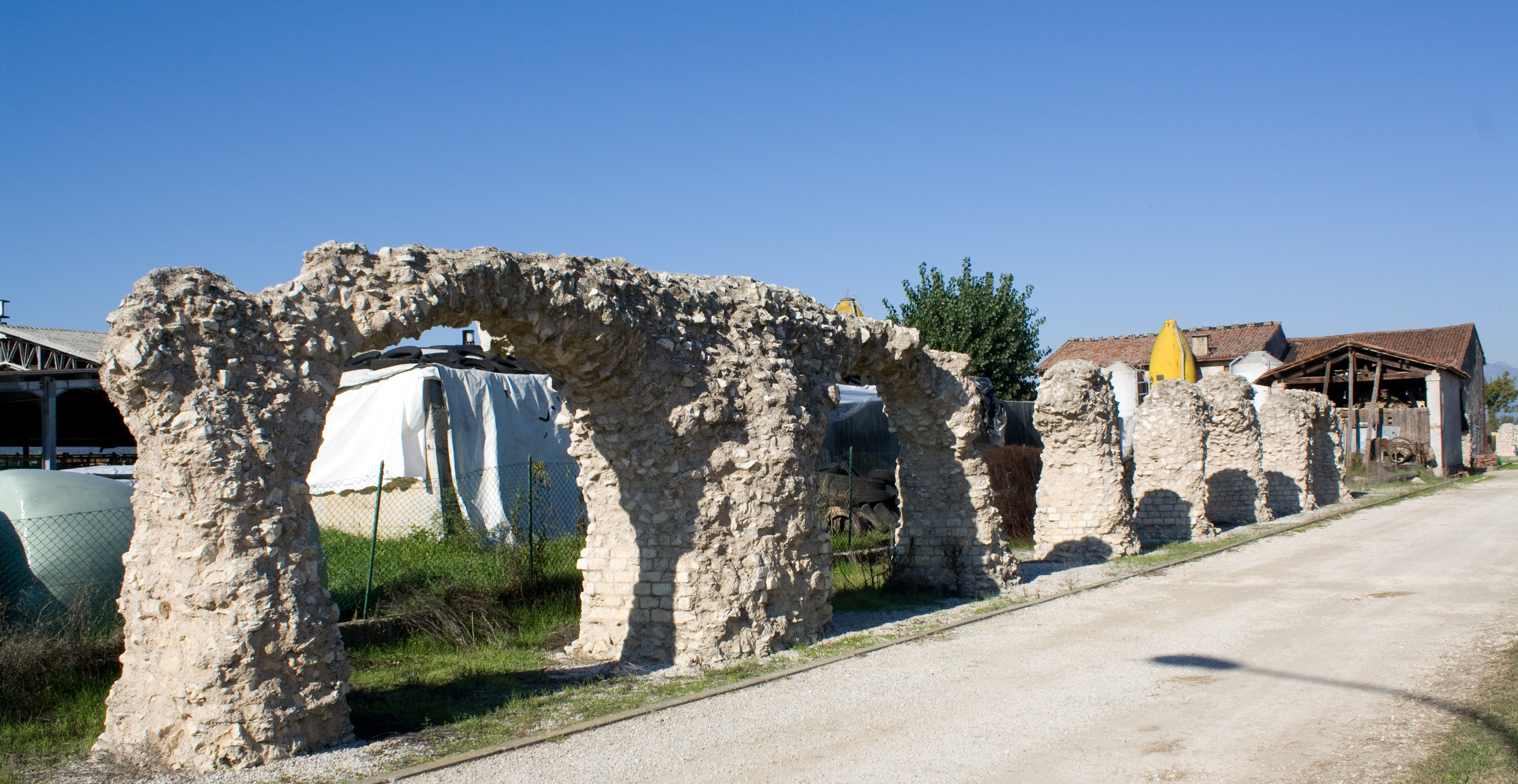
The Roman aqueduct in the locality of Lobia

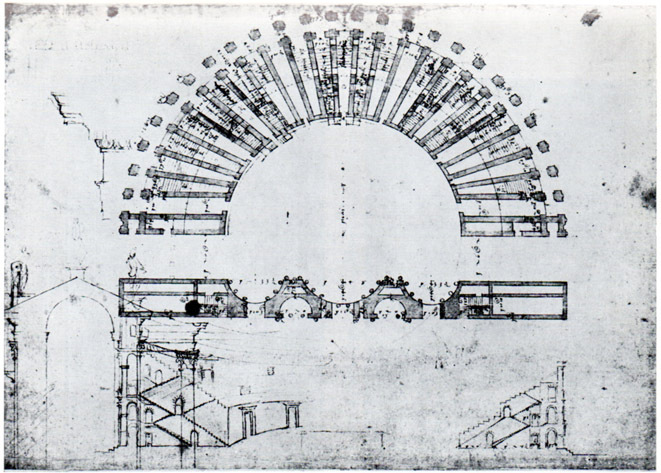
Plan of the Roman theater in Borgo Berga. Survey by Andrea Palladio.

In the 1st century AD, Vicenza gained some prominence, to the extent that parts of the walls were demolished to allow urban expansion and the Teatro Berga was constructed, hosting ludi scenici, with its exact perimeter and 24 arches still visible, situated beyond the Retrone and connected to the center by a bridge, at the confluence of roads from the southeast (from Costozza–Longare) and southwest (from Lonigo–Sant’Agostino), skirting the slopes of the Berici Hills, to make it easier for spectators to enter. Behind the stage, on the northern side, a large quadriporticus extended to the river, where spectators could linger. The theater was used for performances at least until the 3rd century AD.

A city of minor strategic importance, Vicenza was the birthplace of notable figures: the grammarian Quintus Remmius Palaemon, the military commander Aulus Caecina Alienus, a general under Vitellius during the civil war of 69 AD, and the jurist Gaius Saloninus Patriunus, a praetor and consul who died in Rome in 78 AD. He married Ulpia Marciana, the elder sister of Emperor Trajan, and their daughter Salonia Matidia was the ancestor of Emperors Marcus Aurelius and Commodus.

In the 2nd century, Vicenza was spared from being sacked by the Quadi and Marcomanni, who invaded the Regio but were stopped at Opitergium. In the Constantinian era, trade and commerce revived, partly due to the flourishing of one of the empire’s new capitals, Aquileia; the maintenance or restoration of transit routes is evidenced by a miliarium found in Montecchio Maggiore dedicated to Emperor Constantine: “D(omino) N(ostro) Flavio Constantino Maximo Pio Felici Invicto Augusto VII (miles from Vicenza),” now displayed in the atrium of Palazzo da Schio. The permission granted by the Edict of 313 AD to openly practice Christianity led to the construction of two basilicas: the current Cathedral (originally a domus ecclesiae) and the Basilica of Saints Felix and Fortunatus, along the Via Postumia.

== Late Roman Vicetia ==
As the Roman Empire entered a period of profound crisis in the 4th and 5th centuries, the city walls of Vicenza were rebuilt, and its defenses were strengthened. There is no documented evidence that the city was sacked or destroyed during this time, even during the incursions of the Visigoths or the Huns in the 5th century.

Little remains from the brief Ostrogothic period following the fall of the Western Roman Empire, but there is no indication of the city’s decline. Instead, Vicenza likely emerged as a religious center for the native population in contrast to the Arian Goths.

As happened throughout Italy, Vicenza experienced decline and depopulation due to the Gothic War (535–553). The thriving local economy, based on cereal and vine cultivation in the Berici Hills, exploitation of forests, and pastoralism, was severely disrupted by the plundering of the countryside, the interruption of road and waterway transport, famines, and pestilences brought about by the war.

== Early Christianity in Vicenza ==
There is no evidence that Christianity spread in Vicenza before the end of the persecutions, toward the late 3rd century. By the late 4th or early 5th century, a basilica outside the walls, dedicated to the martyrs Felix and Fortunatus of Aquileia, was constructed, as was an urban church on the site of a former domus, which later became the cathedral. Although the Christian community at the time was likely prosperous and organized enough to build two places of worship simultaneously, Vicenza does not appear to have been an episcopal see, as a bishop of Vicenza is documented only by the late 6th century.

== Middle Ages ==
=== 6th–9th centuries: The Lombard and Carolingian eras ===
After the Byzantines emerged victorious in the Gothic War (535–553), Vicenza did not remain under their control for long. In 568, the Lombards migrated into Italy, conquering several cities, including Vicenza, which, according to Paul the Deacon, was occupied by Alboin himself and likely established immediately as a ducal seat. Paul the Deacon recounts the deeds of the Duke of Friuli, Wechtar, a native of Vicenza. During the Lombard period, Vicenza held a regionally significant role, and from 589 to 591, it had its first bishop, Oronzio.

Following Charlemagne’s conquest in 774, Vicenza was incorporated into the Frankish kingdom, and the duchy was transformed into a county, retaining the political and cultural importance it had gained under Lombard rule, as evidenced by its frequent mention in imperial diplomas. In 825, Lothair I issued a capitulary, promulgated at the Royal Palace of Corteolona, establishing a public school in Vicenza to educate young scholars from Vicenza, Treviso, Padua, Ceneda, Feltre, and Asolo.

=== 9th–11th centuries: The episcopal lordship ===
Documentation regarding the Vicentine territory in the post-Carolingian era up to the year 1000 is scarce, but by the end of this period, a de facto episcopal lordship had emerged, characterized by the bishop of Vicenza’s possession of extensive lands, exemptions, immunities, the right to collect tributes, and the administration of justice. The bishop assumed roles far beyond religious duties, acting as an arbiter in disputes between citizens and between them and rural communities, protecting the poor, orphans, and widows, defending the city’s interests, encouraging the settlement of Germanic colonists to repopulate alpine pastures and cultivate the countryside, and occasionally overseeing its military defense.

Vicenza and its Comitatus vicentinus (the surrounding territory) were incorporated in 952 into the March of Verona, itself subordinate to the Duke of Bavaria and later the Duke of Carinthia. This remained the framework of imperial administration throughout the 11th century. Officially, the city was subject to a hierarchy of powers descending from the emperor to the duke of Carinthia and the local count. In practice, however, the bishop, though formally subordinate to this secular hierarchy, enjoyed considerable autonomy.

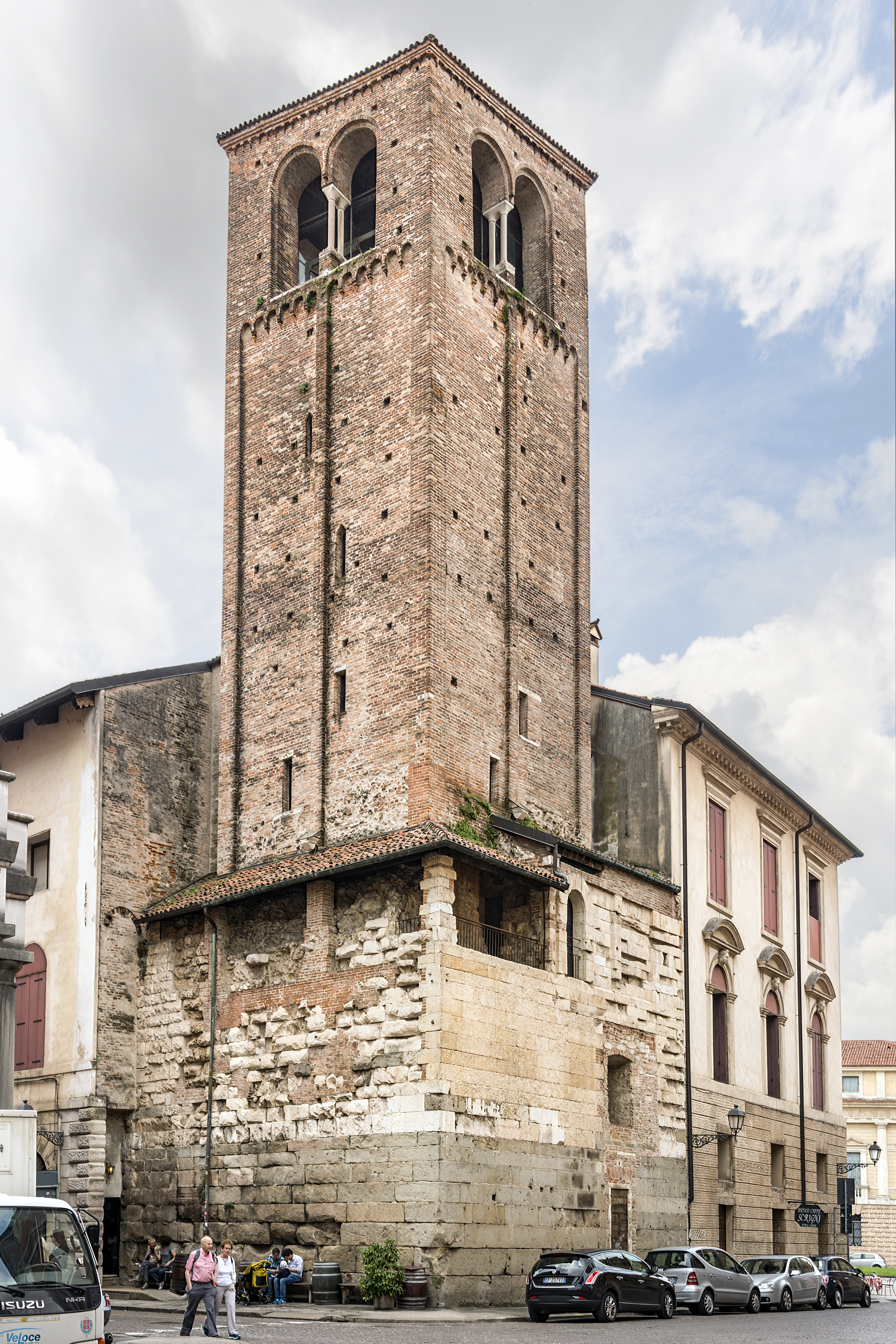
Medieval bell tower of Vicenza Cathedral. The base is part of a 10th-century fortification, with the upper section added in the 12th century.

Two significant acts illustrate this development. The first was the donation by Emperor Berengar I to Bishop Vitale of Vicenza of the castle and two curtes (estates) in Malo. Such donations, along with authorizations to build and own fortifications, likely continued in subsequent years, motivated by a weak central authority and frequent raids by the Hungarians, who in 899 sacked Vicenza, destroying the abbey of Saints Vitus, Modestus, and Crescentia, along with the basilica of Saints Felix and Fortunatus, and possibly the cathedral.

A diploma from Otto III in the year 1000 exempted the inhabitants of 19 castles, including Vicenza’s, owned by Bishop Girolamo, from the fodder tax and granted him the Roman theater, then used for judicial disputes, along with all associated royal rights. Other documents affirming the extent of this authority include the Privilegium of 983, in which Bishop Rodolfo endowed the male Benedictine monastery of Saints Felix and Fortunatus with substantial properties and rights, and another in 1033 confirming the assets assigned to the female Benedictine monastery of San Pietro. These demonstrate that the bishop, beyond holding extensive possessions and rights over much of the Vicentine territory, acted as a feudal lord. However, the episcopal authority did not fully evolve into a territorial lordship, as from Otto I to the 12th century, official functions were assigned to the count, meaning Vicenza never had a count-bishop.

The privileged relationship between Vicenza’s bishops and the emperors, who rewarded them with privileges, persisted throughout the 11th century. Even during the early phase of the Investiture Controversy between the papacy and the empire, Vicentine bishops sided with the latter, as did most bishops under the Patriarchate of Aquileia. This stance was not without conflict: powerful noble families—sometimes the bishop’s own advocates, tasked with protecting episcopal interests in exchange for land and payments—and the counts often took opposing positions. It was Bishop Enrico, after 1122, who first aligned with the papacy.

This period was also marked by the activities of Benedictine settlements in the Vicentine territory, which performed pastoral duties assigned by the bishops and reclaimed extensive swampy areas around the city. Evidence of this is found in numerous churches dedicated to Saints Vitus, Modestus, and Crescentia, characteristic of this monastic order.

==== The urban landscape in the Early Middle Ages ====
Little remains of the early medieval period in the current urban fabric of the city, apart from the bell tower of the cathedral. It is unlikely that, during the periods of Ostrogothic, Lombard, and Frankish sovereignty, Vicenza expanded beyond the boundaries of the Roman city. Certainly, the defining elements of the urban layout, the "indelible imprint" of Romanity, persisted, as confirmed by the most recent and authoritative archaeological investigations.

"Indeed, it is likely that monuments, ... the centers of ancient social, political, and artistic life, gradually disappeared here as elsewhere, due to destruction, abandonment, or repurposing; with them, an entire social practice and culture vanished, along with essential elements of the city's image, consciousness, and ideology".

In contrast to the earlier Greco-Roman city, the medieval city was not only a dwelling place for the living but also, in close proximity, for the living and their dead: buried beneath church floors, along the naves, or simply gathered in areas adjacent to places of worship.

In the 10th century, construction began on a project that would later significantly shape the city's appearance: the building of a city wall, likely started on the foundations and alignment of the earlier Roman walls. This work continued through the 13th century and was finally completed in the 14th and 15th centuries to encompass the new suburbs. Building on the Roman orthogonal grid, the typical medieval "radiocentric" tendency emerged, enclosing the city within a circular perimeter, roughly equidistant from a midpoint between the cathedral and the seat of communal power.

== 12th to early 13th century: The commune ==
In the 12th century, the political influence of urban social groups began to grow in the Veneto region, leading to the establishment of communes. Historians consider the presence of consuls as an indicator of this development, with consuls first documented in Vicenza in 1147—about a decade later than in Verona and Padua—in the document ratifying the Peace of Fontaniva.

The Veneto communes soon clashed with Frederick Barbarossa (1152–1190), who sought to strengthen imperial authority, effectively reasserting royal prerogatives, including fiscal ones. From 1158, the year of the emperor’s second descent into Italy, the cities of the March were placed under his control. However, unable to bear the tax burden imposed by imperial officials and determined to preserve their autonomy, these cities temporarily set aside their individual interests and conflicts. In 1164, they formed the Veronese League to confront the emperor militarily, which in 1167 merged into the broader Lombard League.

Following the League’s victory at the Battle of Legnano, the Peace of Constance in 1183 granted the cities the right to continue collecting taxes, administering justice (though imperial officials retained the right to hear appeals), electing their own magistrates (subject to imperial confirmation), and maintaining or constructing fortifications. Thus, considering the overlapping powers, by the end of the 12th century, Vicenza, like other Veneto cities, was simultaneously an imperial city, an episcopal city, and a communal city.

=== Decline of episcopal power ===
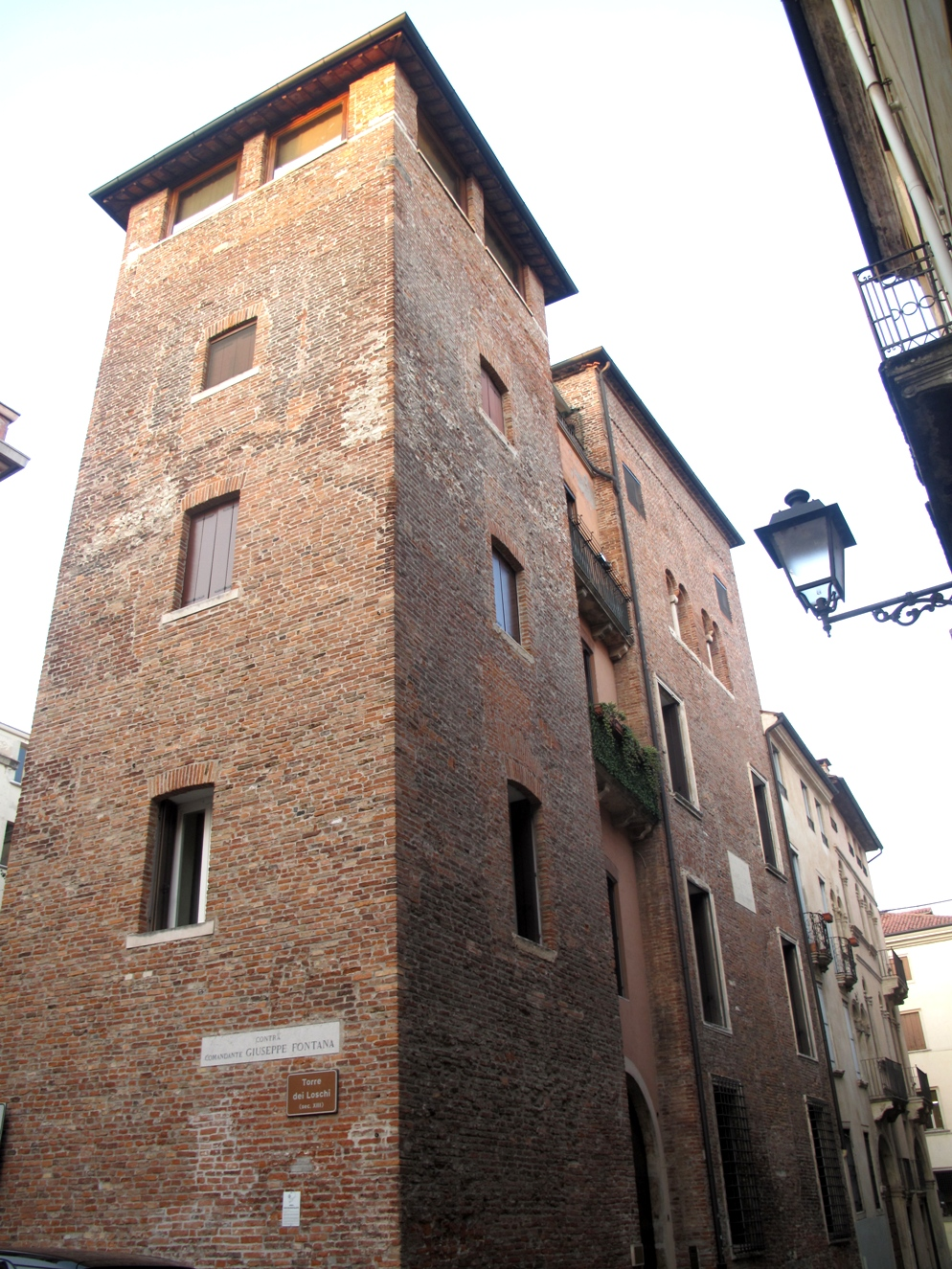
Loschi Towers, in Contrà S. Antonio, likely from the late 11th century. According to tradition, they were spared during Frederick II’s sack of Vicenza in 1236 due to their proximity to the cathedral.

In reality, the emperor was a distant authority, and the bishop’s power had long been waning, undermined by his own vassals and rural lords. These lords increasingly settled in the city, engaging in violence and usurpation. They aligned with the traditional adversary of the bishop, the city’s count, who formed an anti-episcopal faction, the pars Comitis. In response, the bishop organized the pars Ecclesiae, led by his advocatus from the powerful Da Vivaro family. However, even this advocate began acting independently, pursuing his own interests, leaving the bishop isolated, militarily defenseless, economically impoverished, and devoid of political authority. Although compelled by pressures or necessities to continue distributing fiefs and benefices throughout the Middle Ages, the bishop was unable to exercise real control over church assets.

In the final decades of the 12th century, the bishops’ efforts focused on defending the Church’s power and possessions in the city and surrounding territory. Cacciafronte and Pistore were killed for this reason, Uberto was deposed in 1212, and Niccolò Maltraversi and Zilberto were notable for their mismanagement of ecclesiastical assets and debts to usurers, which forced them to sell properties and jurisdictions. The cathedral canons faced similar ruin, unable to collect the tithes owed to them in the city and in the colture. Monasteries and parishes also fell prey to the greed of families and even the commune itself.

=== Emerging families ===
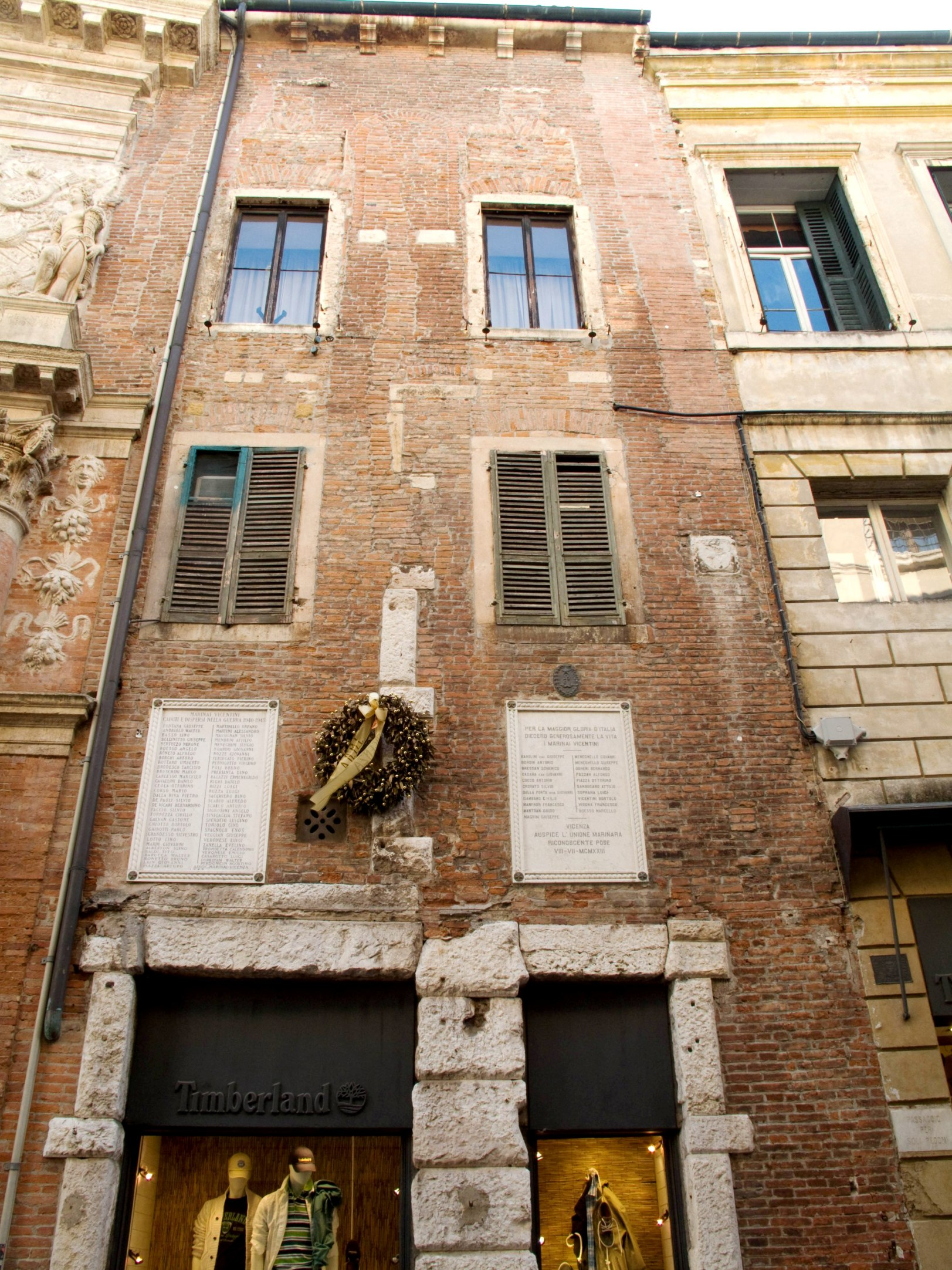
Verlato Tower in Contrà del Monte. Its existence is documented from the 12th century; in 1312, it was confiscated by the commune from the Verlato family, and in 1404, it became the residence of the Venetian captain.

In the second half of the 12th century and throughout the 13th century, families were the true protagonists of the city’s and surrounding territory’s history. The origins of few are known; it is believed that their founders were often men-at-arms who arrived in Italy with emperors and were rewarded with lands and privileges—such as the Da Romano and possibly the Da Trissino—or families that gradually increased their power at the expense of other local landowners, as seen with the Da Sossano or Da Sarego. Many families became feudal lords by serving bishops—the first known investiture for the Da Breganze came from the Bishop of Padua—receiving estates and ville from them. In times of raids and violence, when defense was the primary need, these families established themselves by ensuring this essential service through their castles, fortifications, and armed forces, protecting trade routes and settlements. To this end, they structured their territories as small kingdoms with autonomous administration and a tax system that reached inhabitants comprehensively, providing resources to manage and expand their power. Within their domains, local feudal lords, like the count and the bishop, held absolute authority over people and property.

Among the most powerful families were the Maltraversi counts, who held numerous fiefs and castles in the Vicenza and Padua territories and controlled various assets and rights granted by the bishops, their overlords, as well as several abbeys.

In the last two decades of the 12th century, a fierce rivalry arose between the Maltraversi family and the bishops of Vicenza over the possession of fiefs on the right bank of the Val Leogra—including Malo—which culminated in the 1184 assassination of Bishop Giovanni de Surdis Cacciafronte by a hitman named Pietro, likely on the orders of Count Uguccione Maltraversi.

He was succeeded by Bishop Pistore, who excommunicated the count and stripped him of the fief, granting it to the family of the bishop’s advocatus, the Da Vivaro. Unwilling to accept the loss, in 1200, Maltraversi launched a sudden nighttime assault, seizing the castle of Pieve from the Da Vivaro. Bishop Pistore personally led an effort from Vicenza to retake the castle but was killed during the attempt. The Da Vivaro later regained the castle and held the fief on the right bank of the Leogra for nearly 150 years.

During this period, the Maltraversi formed marriage alliances with powerful families, strengthening political ties with the Este region. However, they had to share power in the city with other families. The family also included Niccolò Maltraversi, appointed in 1213 by Pope Innocent III as apostolic administrator and later bishop of Vicenza. He attempted to halt the sale of ecclesiastical assets and reduce the substantial debt accumulated by his predecessors, though without success.

Another powerful family was the Trissino, whose progenitor, Olderico Trissino, arrived in Italy with Barbarossa, who granted him a lordship in the upper Valle dell’Agno. Their first castle was likely in Trissino, from where they expanded their holdings to Quargnenta, Cornedo, and Valdagno, in an area undergoing land reclamation that benefited from the immigration of Germanic peasants. They founded additional castles in Valdagno and Paninsacco. From their controlled territory, they collected tithes, chestnut harvests—the mountain slopes were covered with chestnut groves—and milling taxes from the numerous mills they owned, particularly along the Agno River.

The Da Breganze were even more powerful than the Da Trissino, possessing several castles, such as that of Piovene, though they typically resided in their fortified castrum at Breganze, strategically located for trade routes to Bassano and Trento and fortified with multiple towers. In the early 13th century, they had at least 86 vassals and 125 servants and maids. Their holdings, scattered across a vast territory northeast of Vicenza—in the Valle dell’Astico, the Asiago Plateau, and the areas of Marostica and Bassano—formed both economic and jurisdictional units, known as comitatus.

Other prominent families included the Da Sossano, Da Sarego, Da Vivaro, Da Arzignano, and, above all, the Da Romano, who exercised de facto hegemony over Bassano at least since the 1180s.

=== The commune ===
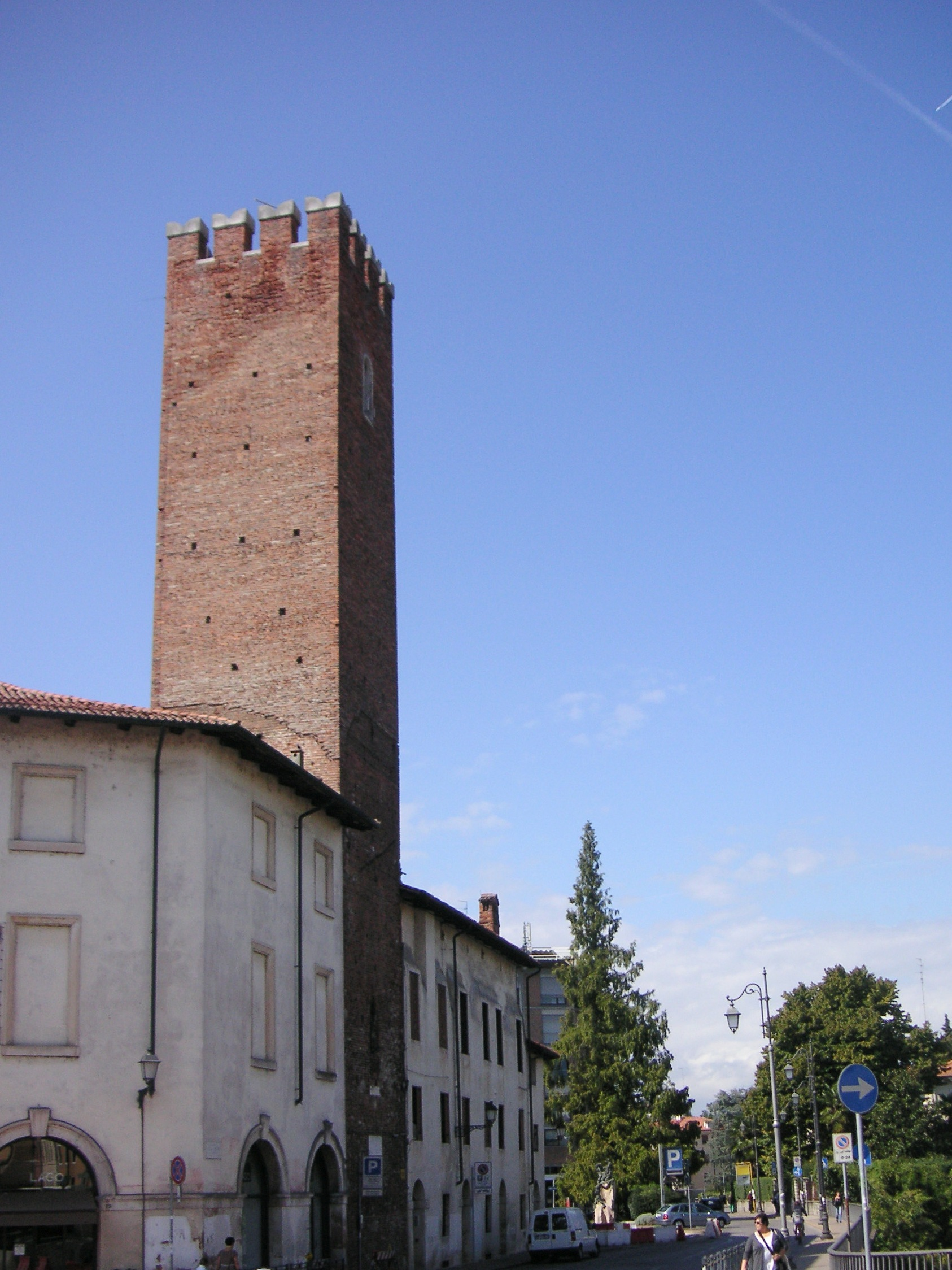
The Coxina Tower, from the 13th century, incorporated into the Palazzo del Territorio.

Unlike Verona and Padua, which were located at the crossroads of major trade routes and where merchants and artisans were the most prominent social groups at the rise of the medieval commune, Vicenza was dominated by rural lords. While maintaining their fiefs, these lords settled in the city to participate more easily in regional alliances and conflicts, building fortified houses and towers. Previously, their rural life relied on in-kind rents, but in the city, families required greater liquid wealth. Thus, the emerging and increasingly powerful middle class consisted of usurers, judges (Pilio, Alberto, Losco, Pellegrino, Adamo), and notaries (Spinello, Bergullo).

Institutionally, in the mid-12th century, consuls were established to assist the bishop. Later, their numbers increased, and they became collaborators of the podestà, who were either local or foreign and alternated in leading the commune.

The podestà of the first half of the 13th century relied on administrative and judicial collaborators: consuls, judges, assessors, caniparii (custodians of communal assets), notaries, extimatores (responsible for liquidating insolvent debtors’ assets), and saltari (guardians of communal lands). They were directly responsible for tax collection, city and district defense—through permanent guarding of walls and fortifications—and mobilizing men when needed.

Upon taking office, the podestà swore to uphold the city’s statute. Alongside him, with absolute decision-making power, operated the Consilium plenarium (comprising several dozen members) and the Council of Credenza. However, real power over the commune was held by the great families, who always controlled—directly or through intermediaries—the offices of podestà and consuls. Even notaries and judges, though formally dependent on the count and emperor, were often colluded with or originated from these families.

=== The fraglie ===
In Vicenza and the Veneto, the guilds of arts and crafts in the medieval commune were called fraglie. Admission required substantial financial contributions and a certificate from the candidate’s parish, attesting to their origins and moral qualities. Another certificate verified completion of an apprenticeship in the craft. Those seeking admission as a master had to pass a rigorous competency exam.

Each craft was governed by a so-called banca, elected by the assembly (capitolo) of all registered masters. The gastaldo was the highest office, safeguarding the fraglia’s interests. Other roles included the sindaco or accountant-administrator, the bancali (confreres with various duties), and the contradicente, who reviewed proposals for the capitolo. Additional positions included the notary and the anziano, the latter a figure of high moral standing tasked with upholding the fraglia’s rights.

Various fraglie are documented in the 13th-century commune: medicorum (physicians), mercatorum (merchants), notariorum, iudicum (judges), cerdonum (shoemakers), zavattari (cobblers), merzariorum (haberdashers), sartorum, carnificum (butchers), and tabernariorum (innkeepers and tavern owners). Other guilds included textile merchants, goldsmiths, furriers, tanners, masons, brickmakers, stonecutters, blacksmiths, apothecaries, boatmen, potters, grocers, hatmakers, carpenters, second-hand dealers, millers, porters, perfumers, booksellers, moneychangers, heralds, barbers, and pipers (present at public civic and religious ceremonies).

In the city, guilds participated in major religious solemnities, such as the feasts of Corpus Domini, Santa Corona, and the patron saints Felix and Fortunatus. During processions, each fraglia marched behind its banner, bearing the name and image of its patron saint, followed by confreres and the banca members.

In addition to craft guilds, there were others focused on devotion, mutual aid, or charity.

=== The urban landscape in the 13th century ===
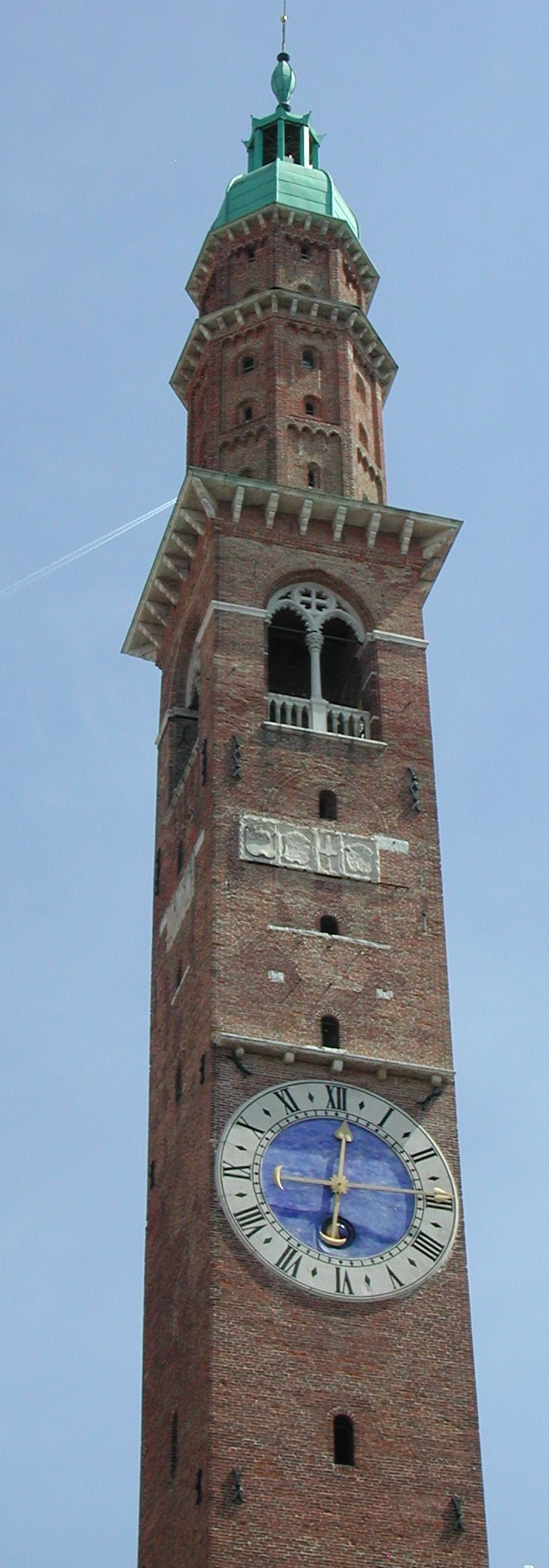
The Torre Bissara in its current appearance.

The arrival of feudal families transformed the city’s appearance, enriching it with private and public buildings. According to the chronicler Giambattista Pagliarino, writing centuries later, the towers numbered over a hundred. This may be an exaggeration, but it is documented that in 1208, Podestà Guglielmo di Pusterla issued a praeceptum, a sort of building regulation, to manage the proliferation of buildings and walls and the occupation of public spaces.

In the 13th century, Vicenza’s urban structure resembled that of other Veneto cities. At the heart of the oldest settlement—near the presumed site of the Roman Forum—stood the Palatium vetus, the commune’s first seat in the second half of the 12th century; the Salone dei Quattrocento, supported by arches under which the ancient cardo maximus passed and where the Council of Credenza met; and, further east, the Palazzo del Podestà, flanked to the north by the Torre dei Bissari and to the south by Torre del Tormento, representing the seat of public power. Surrounding these were market squares for retail trade: Piazza delle Biave (for fodder and seeds), Piazza del Vino, Piazza delle Erbe, the Old and New Fish Markets, Contrà Muscheria (for gloves and leather goods), and streets occupied by legal professions, such as the Nodari, and financial activities, like Contrà dei Giudei.

Nearby was the citadel, still partially fortified, of religious buildings: the cathedral, the bishop’s palace, and the canons’ residences.

=== Formation of the Vicenza district ===
Like other Veneto cities, Vicenza sought to gain political control over the surrounding territory, consisting of large landed estates and castles scattered across the countryside, originally belonging to the bishop, the cathedral chapter, major urban monasteries, and lay lords.

The city expanded its jurisdictional boundaries unevenly, through direct possessions—sometimes arbitrarily occupied, sometimes confiscated—and by protecting the interests of rural lords who had settled in the city. This created a highly fragmented landscape, which the commune sought to simplify by neutralizing competing powers to achieve full control over the territory, particularly over strategic strongholds and seigneurial castles. This process is known as the construction of the communal district or the conquest of the countryside.

Control over trade and communication routes, especially rivers—the most efficient and economical means of transporting goods and people at the time—was of particular importance. The Vicentines undertook significant hydraulic works, including the diversion of the Astico and the construction of new canals. Between Vicenza and Padua in the mid-12th century, there were outright wars over control of waterways.

By the 13th century, the Commune of Vicenza controlled over 200 villae, encompassing nearly the entire territory corresponding to the modern province, except for marginal areas such as the communes of Bassano and Marostica and the Asiago Plateau.

=== Loss of civic autonomy ===
Factional conflicts within the city resumed, but by this time—as evidenced by the names of podestà from cities of the March—they were inseparable from political, military, and marital alliances with other regional lordships. Efforts were made to prevent the return of the Da Romano, whose castles were handed over to the Commune of Padua in 1226. Despite this, Alberico da Romano prevailed and returned to Vicenza as podestà the following year. A coalition of the March’s major cities, the Lombard League, and the papacy, spurred by internal opposition, moved against him. Alberico was forced to leave, replaced by the Venetian Filippo Zulian, who represented the victorious political faction and governed cum maximo vigore.

Vicenza would never again be an autonomous city. It was now subjugated by Padua, which—except for the Ezzeline period—would dominate it until 1311, later succeeded by Verona, Milan, and then Venice.

Political subjugation hindered the development of a robust economy, including the ability to mint its own coinage—a symbol of a city’s wealth and power—or the emergence of a strong class of commercial entrepreneurs. Lacking capital, the city and landowners did not invest in major land reclamation projects, leaving large areas uncultivated. This depressed economy affected the entire society: the magnates, who faced significant expenses to maintain their status; small landowners; and the poor, who struggled with daily survival.

The only ones to prosper were usurers, who lent money to everyone, enriching themselves through interest and properties seized from insolvent debtors. According to chronicler Gerardo Maurisio, in 1234, Vicenza was ruled by usurers: nunc regitur civica consilio usurariorum. An example is Vincenzo del fu Tealdino, progenitor of the Thiene, who within a century became one of Vicenza’s wealthiest and most prestigious families.

=== The parable of Giovanni da Schio ===
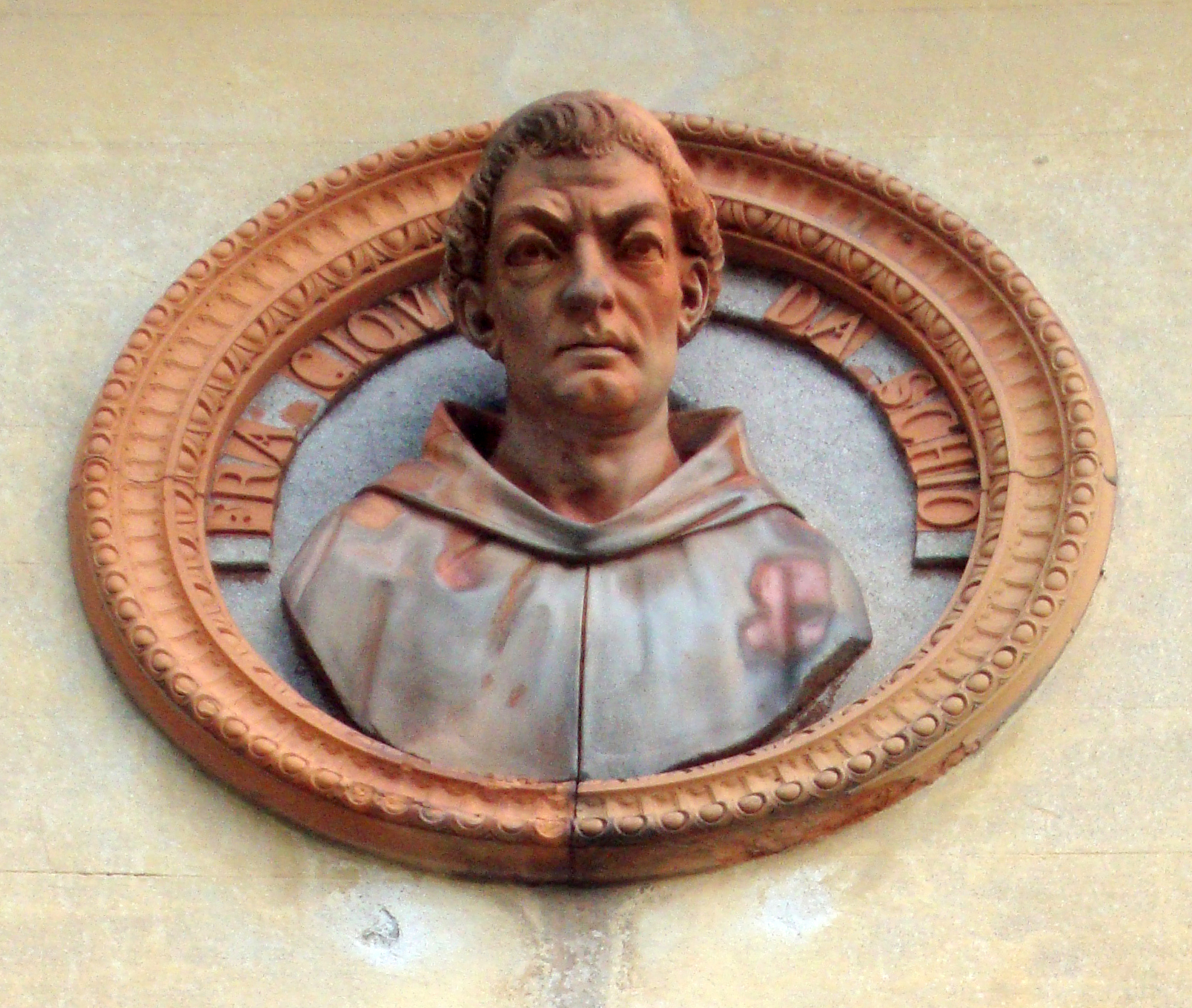
Medallion of Giovanni da Schio, detail from the facade of the Jacquard Theater in Schio (VI).

Amid this situation, Gerardo Maurisio recounts a notable episode. In 1233, Giovanni da Schio, a key figure in the penitential Alleluia movement, a Dominican with extraordinary personal charisma, inspired crowds in the countryside and city. Preaching the peace of Christ, he urged the powerful to abandon hatred and live in harmony. Empowered by the commune as dux et comes civitatis, he issued decrees to allow exiles to return, free political prisoners and debtors, curb usury, and even had these measures incorporated into the communal statutes.

Aware that Vicenza’s factional struggles were fueled by external political forces, he sought to extend his peacemaking efforts to other March potentates. In late August of the same year, he convened an assembly in the countryside of Paquara, near Verona, attended by bishops, podestà, great lords, and a vast crowd proclaiming miracles. Giovanni called for universal peace and social justice. The attending potentates, including Azzo d’Este and the brothers Ezzelino and Alberico da Romano, exchanged promises of peace, forgiveness, and friendship. However, the success was short-lived. Within days, distrust and hostility resurfaced among the families, usurers schemed, and the Church distanced itself. Giovanni was confined in Vicenza’s episcopal palace, stripped of all powers, later released, and forced to leave the city permanently, where everything reverted to its prior state.

=== Culture and religious life in the 13th century ===
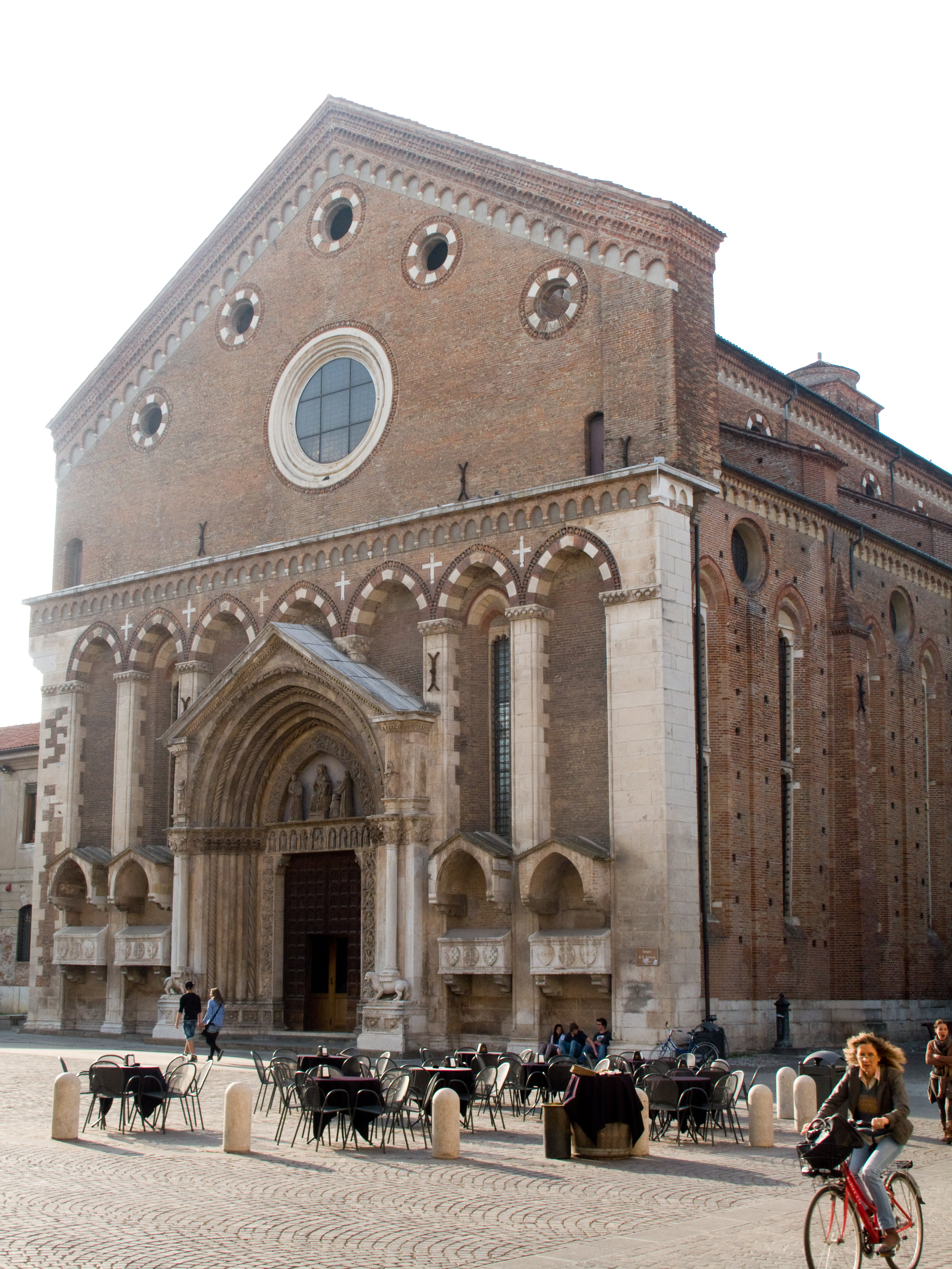
The facade of the Franciscan church of San Lorenzo, completed around the mid-14th century.

Vicenza did not exhibit the same vibrancy as other north-central Italian cities in the 13th century, a period when its autonomy and social cohesion weakened in favor of the more dominant nearby cities of Padua and Verona. In the fields of culture, art, and spiritual renewal, few notable figures emerged, with the possible exception of Bartholomew of Breganze.

The establishment and rapid decline of the first university in the Veneto, within a few years, remained an isolated episode.

Regarding religious life, as in the rest of Italy and Europe, the mendicant orders spread rapidly in Vicenza in the early 13th century, organizing themselves according to the city’s natural division into quarters. Each order built at least one significant church and experienced periods of greater influence on civic life.

In the same century, Vicenza also had a Cathar Church, particularly strong during Ezzelino III’s rule, which was repeatedly suppressed and ultimately eradicated by the local Inquisition.

== 13th–14th century: The lordships ==
=== Frederick II and the sack of Vicenza ===
In 1226, Vicenza joined the Second Lombard League to oppose Frederick II’s policies aimed at restoring royal prerogatives in Italy. However, the League was hostile to the Da Romano, leading them to ally with the emperor in 1232 at Pordenone, establishing a pact of mutual, including military, support.

By tradition, the Vicentines—particularly the great families and the bishop—were Ghibelline and not entirely opposed to Frederick. When he returned to Italy in 1236 to combat rebellious communes, he established himself in Verona with his army and sent emissaries to Vicenza’s podestà, Azzo d’Este, demanding the city’s obedience. Azzo refused to receive them and urged the Vicentines to resist. In response to this defiance, on All Saints’ Day, the emperor ordered his troops to assault the city, which they sacked and burned, destroying communal palaces and many tower-houses, sparing only religious buildings.

=== The ‘tyrant’ Ezzelino ===
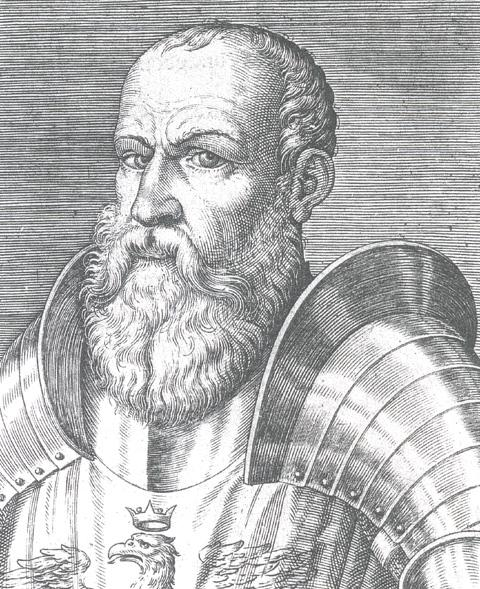
Ezzelino III da Romano.

Having restored imperial prestige with this harsh and exemplary punishment for other cities of the March, Frederick had no reason to prolong the conflict. He pardoned Vicenza and entrusted it to Ezzelino III da Romano, though formal authority was held by a capitaneus et rector governing in the emperor’s name.

Alberico, dominus of fiefs and castles in Vicenza’s territory, believed he could establish his lordship over the city. However, Ezzelino, lord of Verona and Frederick’s trusted ally, was tasked with extending imperial authority across the March, including Vicenza. This led to conflict with his brother, who sought alliances with other city magnates like the Da Vivaro, Pilio, Count Uguccione, judges, usurers, the San Bonifacio, and the Estensi. In 1240, Ezzelino ruthlessly suppressed the conspiracy and expelled Alberico from Vicenza, becoming its sole and undisputed lord.

Ezzelino’s image, traditionally depicted—especially in Verona and Padua—as a cruel and unscrupulous ‘tyrant’, has undergone historical reassessment. Unlike Alberico, who viewed the lordship as a personal and familial power, Ezzelino saw himself as fully invested with the role delegated by the emperor. His consistent goal was not the interest of a family or city but of the empire. Despite marrying four times (once to Selvaggia, Frederick II’s natural daughter), he had no children and showed no interest in establishing a dynasty or hereditary power.

He ruled Vicenza until his death in 1259. For the first decade, he governed with strong authority, generally respecting communal statutes and legality, seeking consensus from both defeated opponents and various social groups. He achieved this by offering compensations to great families, whose power he had curtailed, such as prestigious appointments. He gained the support of judges, notaries, and communal officials, who saw him as a means of escaping Padua’s dominance, and as a condottiero, he was revered by his soldiers. By managing public assets and amassing a vast personal real estate fortune—sometimes buying properties cheaply, receiving concessions, or confiscating from opponents—he built a broad network of clients among the lower classes, renting them houses and small plots for a fee.

His governance deteriorated significantly after Frederick II’s excommunication in 1245 at the First Council of Lyon and especially after his death in 1250. Ezzelino began to see himself as an autonomous authority, no longer tied to the empire, but this was not recognized. He lost support in the city, becoming aggressive and overbearing, imposing heavy taxes and appropriating public and private assets. In 1254, he was excommunicated by Pope Alexander IV, who two years later tasked the Marquis d’Este with leading a crusade against him, joined by major northern Italian cities and some March lords. Ezzelino died in 1259 at Soncino, near Cremona, from wounds sustained in the Battle of Cassano d’Adda.

=== The city-state and Bartholomew of Breganze ===
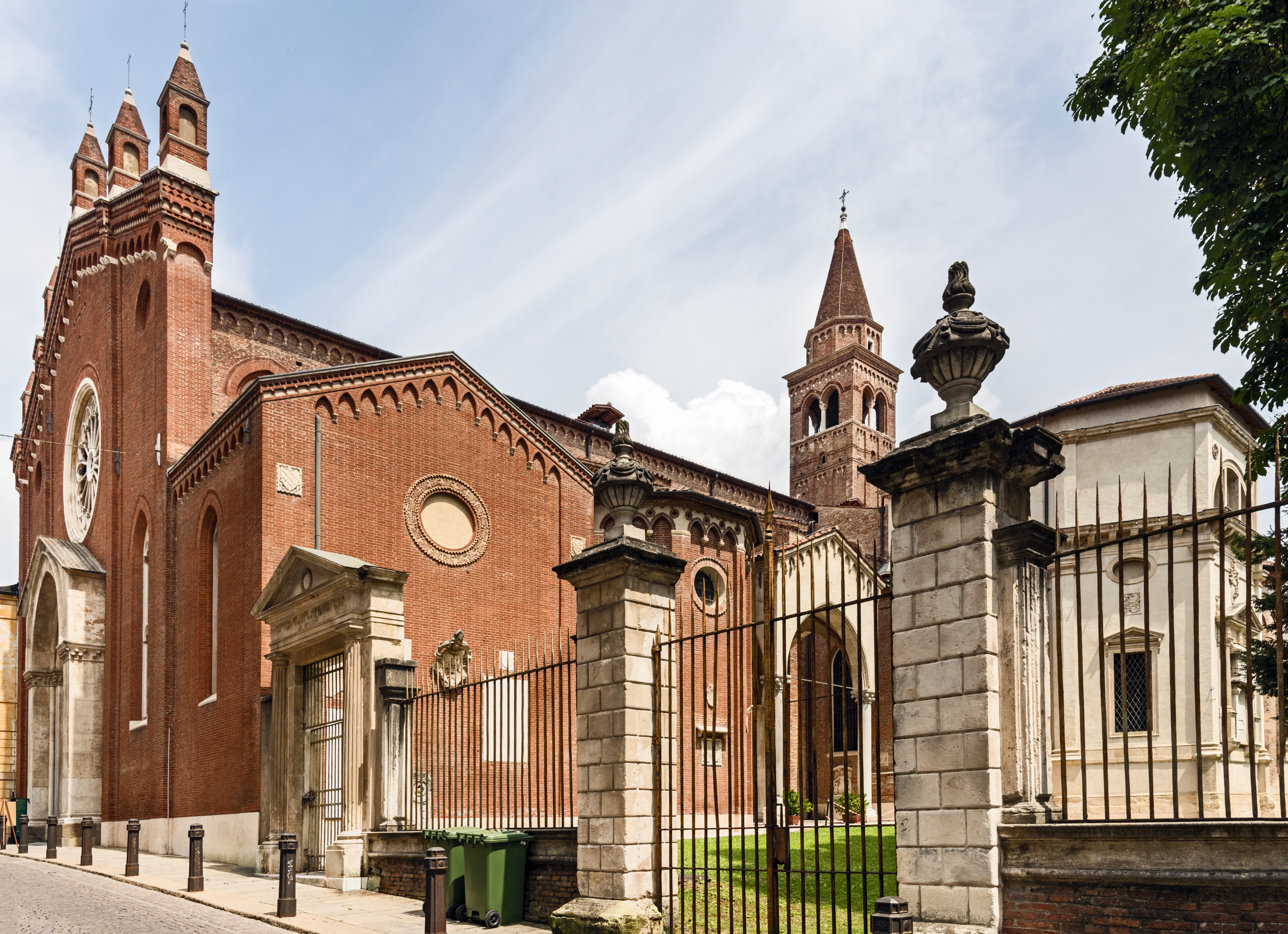
The church of Santa Corona, built to house relics donated by Louis IX of France to Bishop Bartholomew of Breganze.

With Ezzelino’s death and the massacre of Alberico and his entire family, the first truly supra-civic power that had ruled the March for over two decades was eradicated.

In Vicenza, the civic commune was revived, where the magnates—many of whom had retreated to their rural castles—were a minority in the new governing body, the Council of the Twelve, where two-thirds were representatives of the arts and crafts. The commune’s primary goal was to recover all public and private assets confiscated or acquired by the Da Romano. To this end, in 1262, it compiled the Regestum possessionum Communis Vincenciae, a valuable document that provides a detailed reconstruction of the urban landscape of the time. It reflects a new conception of public goods and communal powers, for the first time envisioned as a government of the people, exercising full sovereignty and jurisdiction over all persons and public domain properties in the territory: a true city-state.

In reality, the commune consisted of weak populares classes: artisans and merchants lacked the scale or tradition of real power in the city. The true strongman of those years was Bishop Bartholomew of Breganze, consecrated in 1255 by Pope Alexander IV as an anti-Ezzeline figure, exiled until the tyrant’s death. He arrived in Vicenza with a highly symbolic gift from Louis IX of France: relics of the cross and crown of thorns of Christ, for which he built the church of Santa Corona. With immense prestige, he exerted total influence over the city’s life—as the undisputed arbiter of disputes—and the March, achieving in 1262 a meeting of the four major cities to swear eternal peace.

However, attempts to establish regional hegemony, echoing Ezzelino’s political experience, soon resumed. The Guelph Padua, which had suffered greatly under Ezzelino’s tyranny and could claim a leading role in the liberation, willingly accepted a proposal from some Vicenza citizens to send its own podestà, who favored agreements that disadvantaged Vicenza, particularly regarding territorial sovereignty. To break free from Padua’s alliance, in 1260, with Bartholomew’s involvement, the commune sought the support of Venice, which sent the next two podestà but imposed trade agreements entirely in its favor.

A Paduan podestà followed, sparking a bloody war against magnates and notables, and a Ferrarese one, who waged another against exiles until forced to resign. The situation deteriorated so drastically that in 1264, the commune placed itself under Padua’s custodia. In February 1264, a new Paduan podestà, Rolando da Englesco, militarily occupied the city.

=== Subjugation to Padua ===
The new podestà ordered the compilation of municipal statutes to provide Vicenza with a cohesive body of laws, intended to balance civic powers and thus pacify tensions. However, the statutes of 1264 granted near-absolute authority to the podestà, whose power was only nominally limited by the Major Council, the majority of which consisted of representatives from the fraglie. Bishop Bartholomew was completely stripped of influence and withdrew into a silence marked by disappointment and dismay. The statutes also included numerous provisions regarding urban planning, the maintenance of the territory, roads, and rivers, and environmental protection, with the aim of making the city beautiful and prosperous.

The Vicentines, however, did not readily accept this regime, which they perceived as imposed by a ‘foreign’ city. They attempted further rebellions, achieving in 1266 the appointment of a Venetian podestà, Marco Querini. His tenure was short-lived, as the Major Council, intimidated by the threat of Verona seeking to extend its dominion eastward, requested Padua’s intervention once again. On 22 September 1266, the keys to the city’s gates and fortresses were handed over to Padua’s podestà.

This time, Padua’s domination was complete. Vicenza’s municipal statutes were set aside, and the podestà was required to follow those of Padua, being appointed by Padua’s Major Council and swearing allegiance to it. Padua annexed Bassano and the left bank of the Brenta, a strategically significant area; in effect, Vicenza became the property of the dominant commune. The city was exploited by the Paduans, particularly by the podestà, who enriched themselves through their office, and by lords who seized Vicentine fiefs, castles, and estates. Usurers lent money to both the poor and the wealthy at exorbitant rates, their activities unchecked. While no direct action was taken against Vicenza’s seigneurial families, Padua favored the city’s lower classes, rural communities, and territorial communes to weaken them. In contrast, the bishop faced relentless persecution and plundering of his assets.

This domination lasted over 40 years, marked by occasional rebellions that were always suppressed and never successful, partly due to the Vicentines’ inability to unite. Meanwhile, Verona’s power grew, and by the century’s end, Padua, fearing an attack supported by some Vicentines, strengthened the city’s defenses, particularly fortifying the Isola (the river-surrounded area near present-day Piazza Matteotti) and increasing pressure on the population.

The moment of ‘liberation’ came with Emperor Henry VII’s descent into Italy in October 1310. While at his court in Milan, the Vicentines sent a plea for aid, and he seized the opportunity to punish Padua, which opposed him. On 15 April 1311, imperial troops, led by Aimone, Bishop of Aosta, and reinforced by a Veronese contingent, entered the city, occupied it, and destroyed the Paduan fortress in the Isola, which the podestà had hastily abandoned.

=== The Vicentine territory as a battlefield ===
The Vicentines soon realized that their longed-for liberation merely meant transitioning from one domination to another. The emperor immediately demanded a tribute and, through his vicar, imposed new statutes that modified those of 1264. These required, among other things, all rural lords to return to the city, where they would regain their role as the dominant class (their seats in the Major Council soon became lifelong and hereditary, as in Venice), at the expense of artisans and the petty bourgeoisie favored by Padua. The statutes also mandated the demolition of all castles and fortifications in the district (another way to curb the power of landed lords), though this rule was not enforced, and the castles remained, garrisoned by generally Veronese captains.

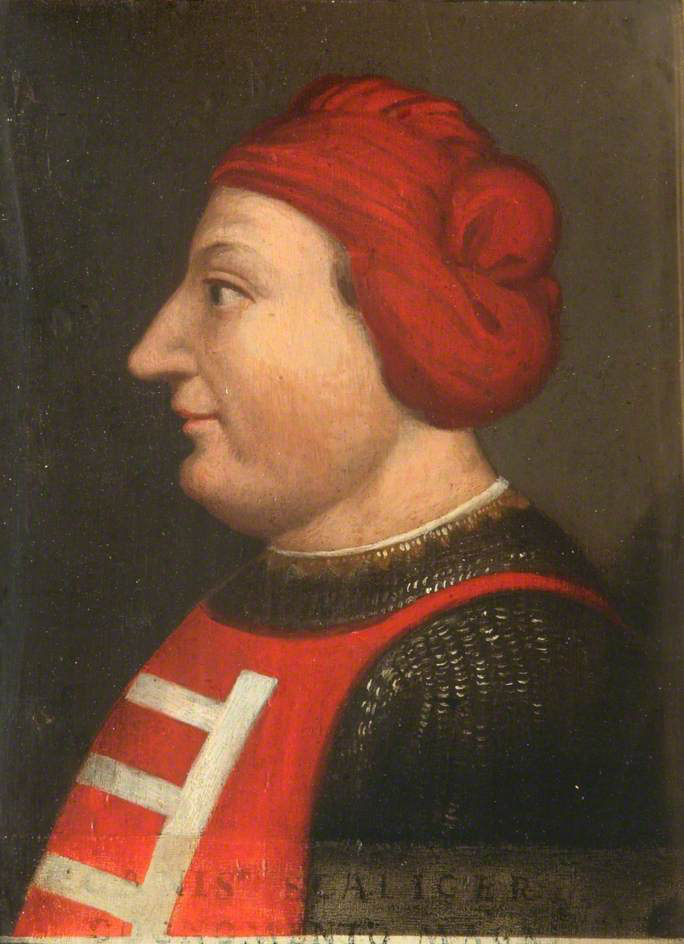
Cangrande I della Scala

In February 1312, the lord of Verona, Cangrande I della Scala, was sent to Vicenza as imperial vicar, and five years later, he assumed direct governance of the city.

A devastating war between Verona and Padua soon began, fought primarily in the Vicentine territory, causing immense damage to the population and the local economy. The conflict stemmed from various causes, including Cangrande’s expansionist ambitions and Padua’s resistance to imperial authority. Vicenza contributed to its outbreak by diverting the Bacchiglione’s course once again to harm the hated Paduans.

The clashes occurred mainly in the lower Vicentine territory, though the Paduans occupied Borgo San Pietro, just outside Vicenza’s walls (still the early medieval ones, as the Scaliger walls had not yet been built). The war ended in 1314 with Cangrande’s decisive victory, having occupied Padua itself, and he agreed to peace mediated by Venice.

The following years saw two more wars—those of 1317–18 and 1319–20—between Verona and Padua, with more limited effects on the Vicentine territory, both concluding with Cangrande’s victories.

After his death, his nephew Mastino II della Scala failed to maintain control over the vast territory conquered by his predecessor, but Vicenza’s political future was now tied to Verona’s. This became evident in 1387, when both cities passed to the Visconti.

=== The Scaliger lordship ===
With the arrival of the Scaligers, a new era began for Vicenza’s seigneurial families. Apart from two failed rebellions in 1312 and 1317 by a few pro-Paduan holdouts, there would be no organized opposition in the city for centuries. The magnates, now resigned to coexisting with external power, focused solely on preserving or consolidating their family wealth.

Subjugation to an external lordship did not mean the abolition of civic institutions, which were partly modified but also strengthened to handle administrative rather than political tasks. The podestà’s office was filled by prestigious figures, naturally from families favored by the Della Scala. New roles were created: the capitanio, with military responsibilities—a position retained during the Visconti and Venetian periods—and the deputati ad utilia, akin to assessors, closely aligned with the podestà and delegated broad functions.

The fattoria scaligera was established, a new body tasked with managing public landed estates, as well as the still-substantial episcopal properties, and overseeing the collection of duties levied by the commune from the district.

Tax burden continued to rise but was borne by the countryside: the commune protected not only the lordship’s interests but also those of private citizens, its own cives.

=== The city's development and the expansion of its walls ===
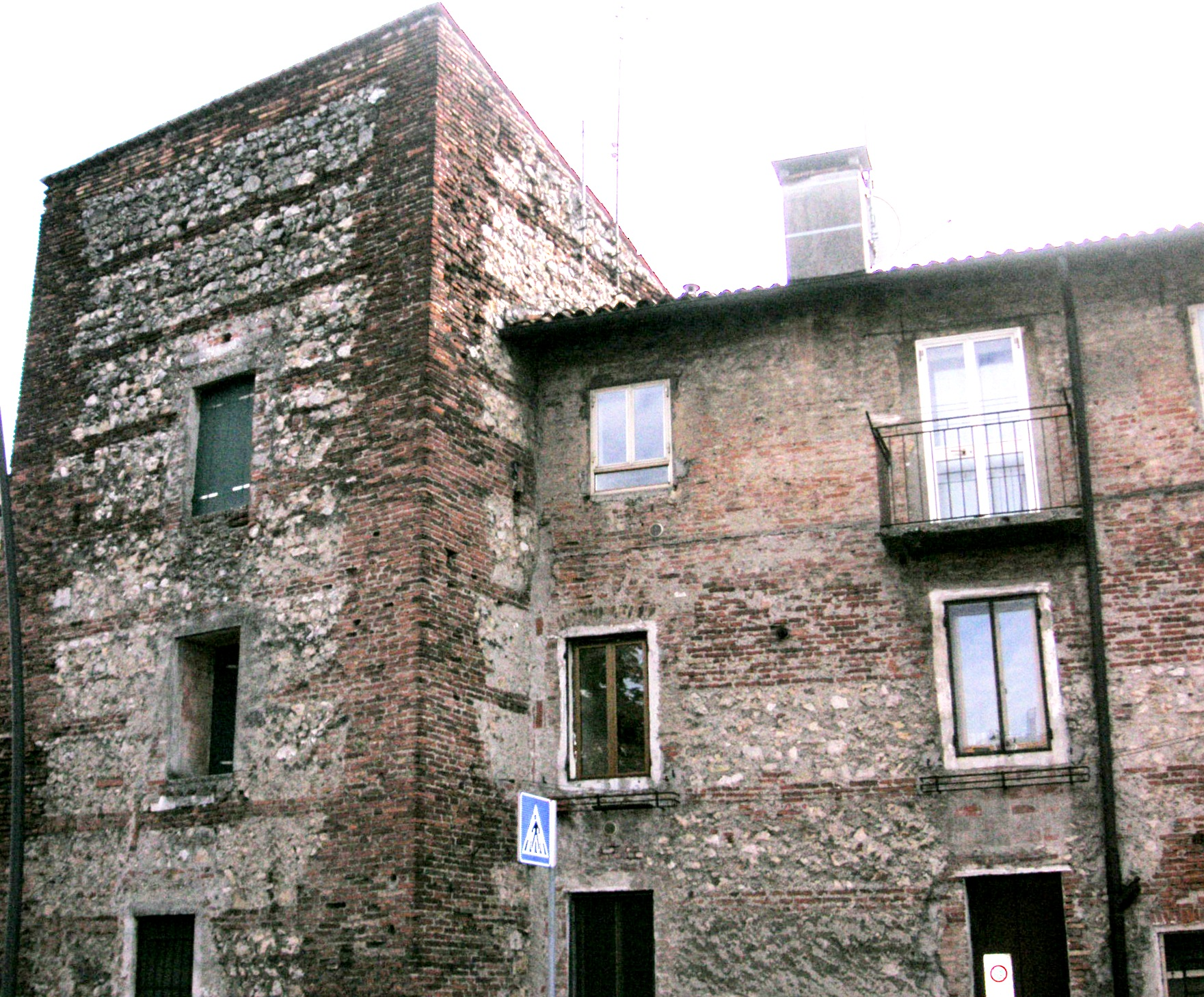
Houses built into the Scaliger walls in Borgo Santa Lucia

The city grew wealthier and expanded. Throughout the 14th century, the population increased significantly, and suburbs formed outside the early medieval wall. From 1365, Cansignorio della Scala ordered its expansion, both east and west of the historic center.

The densely populated eastern suburb, beyond the Bacchiglione, was enclosed by a new section featuring the gates of Santa Lucia, Padua, and Camarzo—located at the end of Contrà San Pietro and later closed—which provided access to roads from Treviso, Padua, and Casale, converging at the bridge (now Ponte degli Angeli), the only crossing over the river since Roman times.

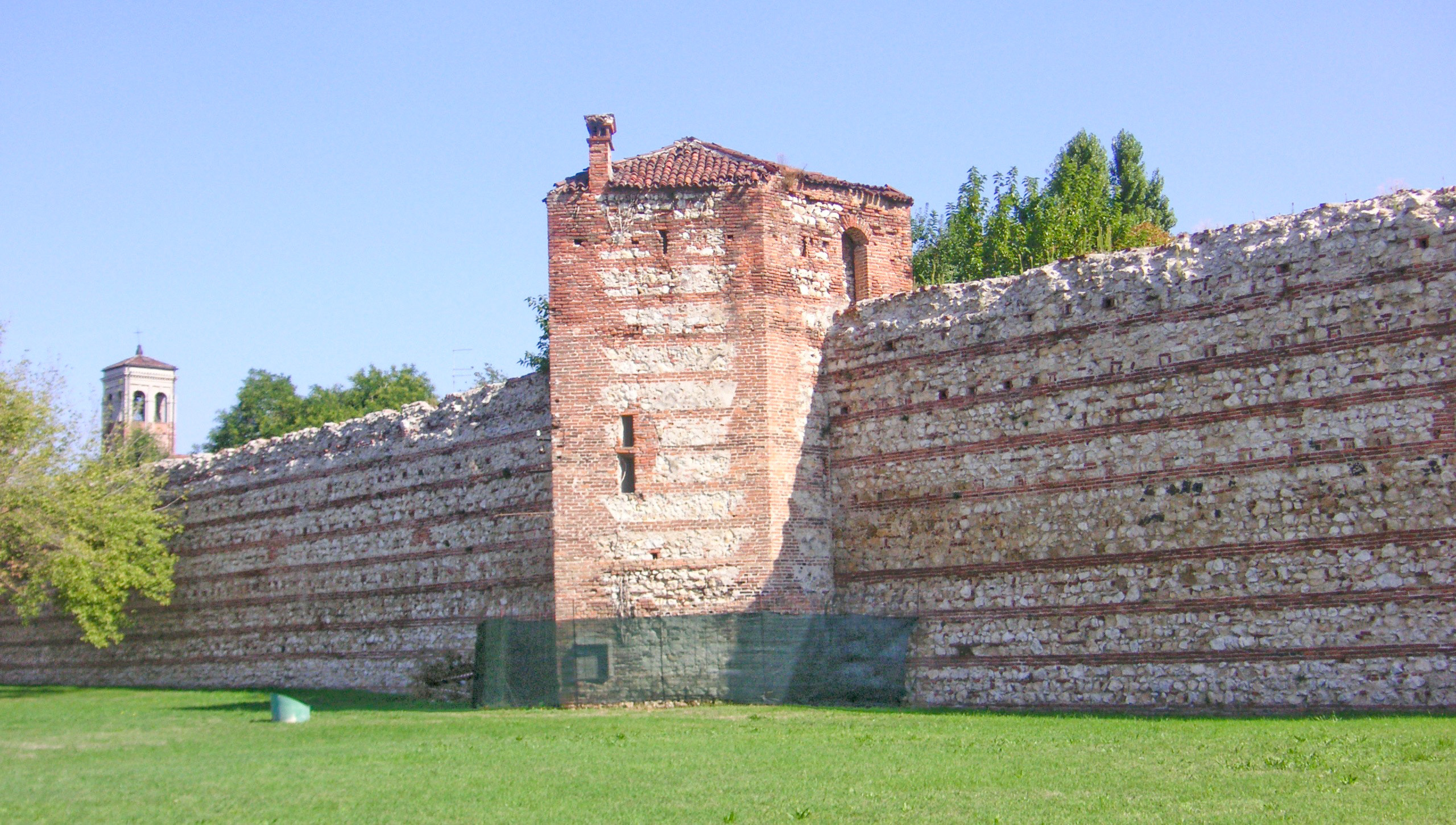
The Scaliger walls in Viale Mazzini

To the west, the new wall extended from the fortified structure of Porta Castello northward, establishing the Rocchetta outpost, opening at the Nuova and Santa Croce gates, then following the Bacchiglione’s course to reconnect near the Pusterla bridge. This new section enclosed an area that was as yet uninhabited, which, by Antonio della Scala’s design, was laid out with an orthogonal street grid and large, regular blocks.

The construction of the walls, which involved altering the Bacchiglione and Roggia Seriola’s courses to serve as moats, preserved the integrity of the old wall. This maintained the historic core’s identity, to the extent that the new inclusions were consistently referred to, by local historians and in common parlance, as the city’s “suburbs.”

Unlike larger cities such as Padua and Verona, Vicenza never saw a robust merchant or artisan class, which remained subordinate even in later centuries. Until the 19th century, the city’s and its territory’s economy remained fundamentally tied to the land.

=== Rural economy in the 14th century ===
The general picture of the rural economy was not described by contemporary local historiography and must be inferred from rural statutes and numerous notarized private deeds that have been recovered.

Given the sparse population and the significant presence of highlands (Lessini, Altopiano, Berici) and water bodies (the lakes of Pusterla and Longara and marshy lowland areas), until the early 14th century, most of the territory was likely uncultivated and forested. Even in cultivated areas—the peripheral belt outside the walls—and large private estates, part was kept as woodland for timber, fruit, and hunting boar, roe deer, and small game.

Cultivated land, likely using new techniques—iron plowshares and triennial rotation—was managed extensively for millet and sorghum, with an average seed-to-yield ratio of 1:4. Cultivated land expanded in the first half of the 14th century, extending to hill slopes and valleys, aided by immigration from Trentino’s German-speaking populations.

The territory was highly fragmented, populated by single-family lots that included a portion for cereal production, a meadow for livestock, and a small vineyard.

In the second half of the century, the plague’s consequences—reduced population lowered cereal demand—led to the diversification of farming and an increase in livestock farming. This fostered another productive sector, the wool trade: its presence is documented in suburban monasteries near waterways. By mid-century, the city had both the lanarii (wool workers) and mercatores (cloth merchants) fraglie, with shops in the peronio, the city’s main square. The 1410 wool guild statute records about 7,000 workers in the city.

=== Fall of the Scaligers and rise of the Visconti ===
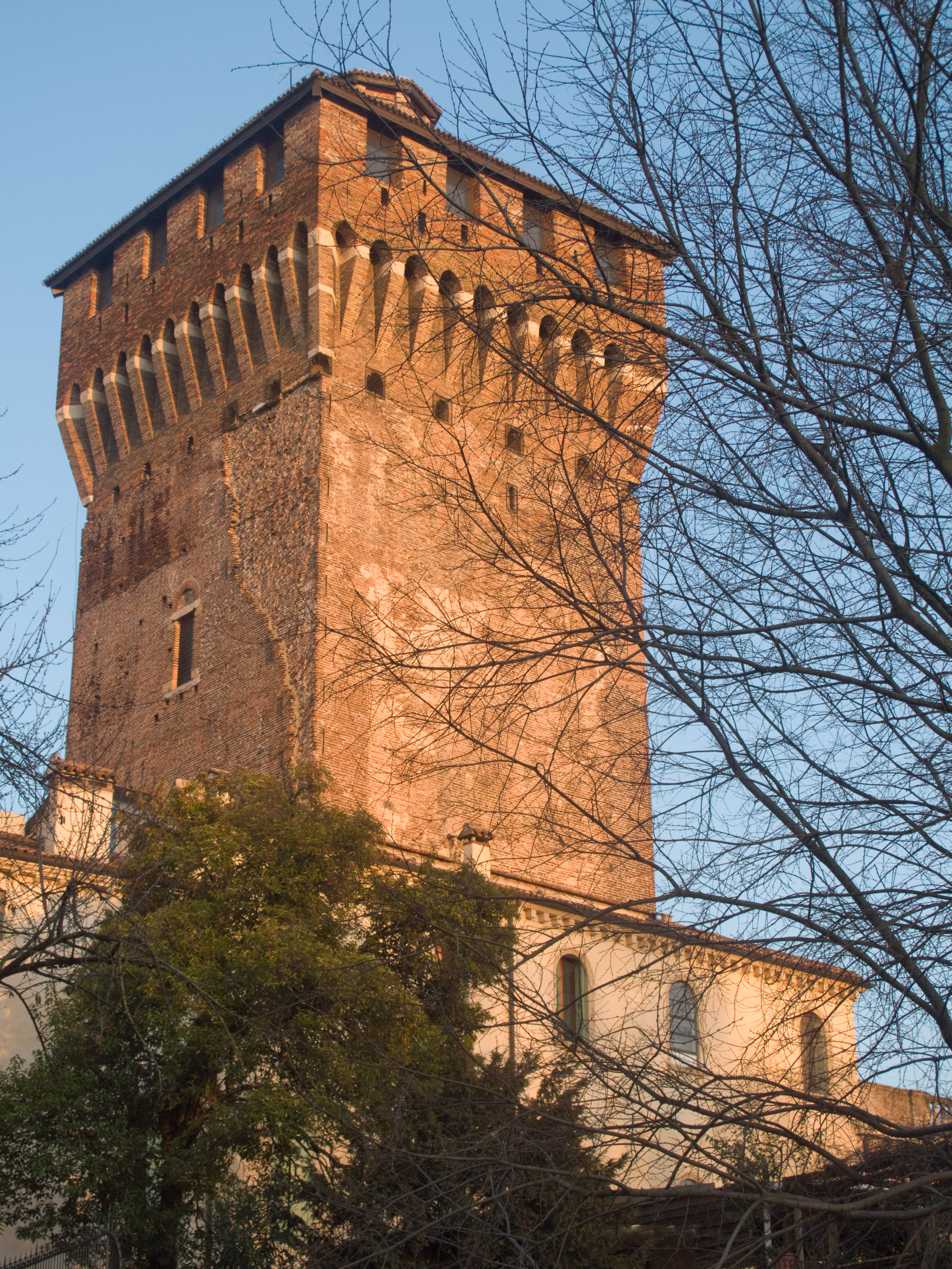
Tower of Porta Castello. The merlon crowning, supported by corbels, and the typical Lombard lantern date to the Visconti period.

Upon Cansignorio della Scala’s death in 1375, leadership of the lordship—now reduced to Verona and Vicenza—passed, per Scaliger custom, to both his illegitimate sons, Bartolomeo and Antonio. In their early years, they were well-regarded for reducing taxes and canceling debts owed by the communities of Verona and Vicenza.

Six years later, however, Antonio had his brother assassinated to rule alone, and his policies shifted. In 1382, he married Samaritana da Polenta and, reportedly influenced by her lavish demands, incurred massive military expenses that depleted the lordship’s coffers, forcing heavy borrowing and alienating public support.

Under these conditions, the Veronese lordship was doomed. In 1385, a coalition against the Scaligers formed in Pavia among the lords of Milan, Mantua, Padua, and Ferrara. The following year, Gian Galeazzo Visconti—having deposed and likely killed his uncle Bernabò in Milan—struck a new pact with Francesco il Vecchio da Carrara, lord of Padua, agreeing to divide the Scaliger domain: Verona to the Visconti, Vicenza to the Carraresi.

In 1386, Gian Galeazzo maintained an ambiguous stance, secretly negotiating with both Francesco da Carrara and Antonio della Scala. But in 1387, seeing the tide turn in Francesco’s favor—after his victory over the Veronese at the Battle of Castagnaro in March—he decisively allied with him. In May, Francesco laid siege to Vicenza and ravaged the surrounding territory for months, though the Vicentines’ fierce resistance prevented him from entering the city.

Together, the Visconti and Carraresi were too strong. On 18 October 1387, Verona fell, partly due to military pressure and partly through betrayal, and Antonio fled. On 24 October, Gian Galeazzo took Vicenza, where he found a ruling class staunchly opposed to subjugation by Padua.

This gave him a pretext to disregard the pact and divide the conquered territories. When Francesco protested, Gian Galeazzo turned his forces against him, forcing his abdication in favor of his son Francesco Novello, and occupied Padua in November 1388.

For Vicenza, the period of Visconti rule began, lasting until 1404.

=== The Visconti lordship ===
Opposed to both Antonio della Scala’s tax-heavy rule and the Paduans, with whom they had hostile relations for two centuries, the Vicentines collaborated with the new lordship’s arrival, consistent with the city’s approach since Roman times: not resisting the stronger power but negotiating surrender terms and remaining loyal to the new ruler.

Influential members of the ruling class, such as Giacomo da Thiene and Giampietro de Proti, facilitated the transition to the Visconti, according to local sources. Seventeen years later, they negotiated the devotion to Venice.

Toward the Venetians, and Vicenza in particular, Gian Galeazzo pursued a policy that, while maintaining strict fiscal and military control, preserved the prior Scaliger organization. He favored the city’s ruling classes, entrusting them with territorial administration through a dedicated Council responsible for appointing district vicars.

This established a model of governance and territorial subjugation by an intermediary city, relatively autonomous due to its own statutes and ruling class, though subject to the state’s capital. This paradigmatic model was later applied under the Serenissima’s rule.

=== Devotion to Venice ===
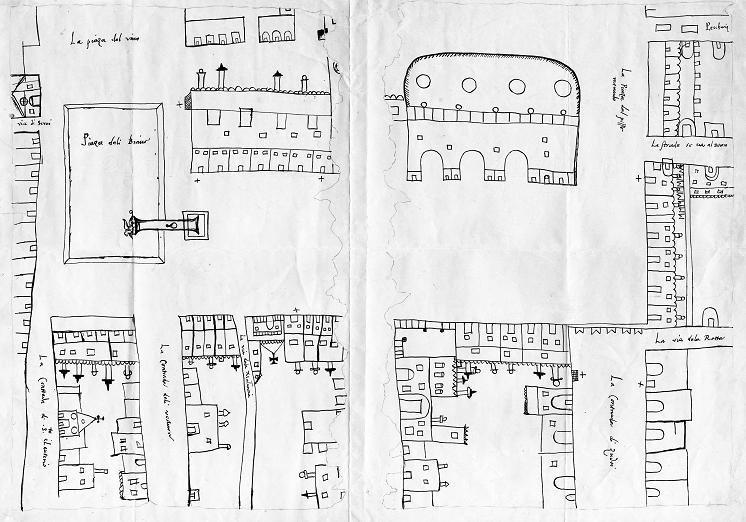
Peronio di Vicenza, drawing, 1480–1481. Vicenza, Biblioteca Civica Bertoliana.

The Visconti rule was strict but brief: Gian Galeazzo Visconti’s death in 1402 sparked a regional war, with Vicenza at its center.

Before dying, Gian Galeazzo had divided his state between his sons Giovanni Maria and Filippo Maria, assigning Vicenza and Bassano to the latter. As minors, both were under their mother Caterina’s regency. The divided state, lacking strong leadership, became a target for its traditional enemies, the Republic of Florence and the Carraresi of Padua, who seized cities and castles. In March 1404, Caterina sought aid from the Doge of Venice, initially offering Bassano, Feltre, and Belluno. When the Venetians, shrewd merchants, held out for more, she added a vaguely defined protectorate over Verona, already held by the Carraresi, and Vicenza, then under siege.

The Vicentines, determined to avoid falling back under Paduan rule, sent envoys to Venice to negotiate the devotion, a form of subjugation to the Serenissima, which in return pledged to respect most prior laws and magistracies through the Statute. Key figures in this decision included Taddeo Dal Verme, serving the Visconti and commanding Vicenza’s garrison, and Iacopo Thiene—who had played a significant role in the 1387 transition from Scaliger to Visconti rule—along with his uncle Giampietro Proti.

On 15 April, Iacopo Thiene left for Venice, returning on 25 April with Giacomo Surian, appointed by the doge, and 250 crossbowmen. Venice, now lord of the territory, demanded that Francesco Novello lift the siege of Vicenza and cease devastating the Berici lands. When he persisted in ravaging the Vicentine territory and, on 7 May, occupied Cologna Veneta, which had also devoted itself to Venice, the war against Padua became inevitable for the Republic. After Verona also devoted itself to Venice, the war swiftly concluded with the Carraresi’s defeat, their leaders taken to Venice and executed.

At the conflict’s end, Venice found itself thrust into the role of a mainland power, master of the entire Veneto. Thus was born the Domini di Terraferma of the Serenissima.

== Modern Era ==
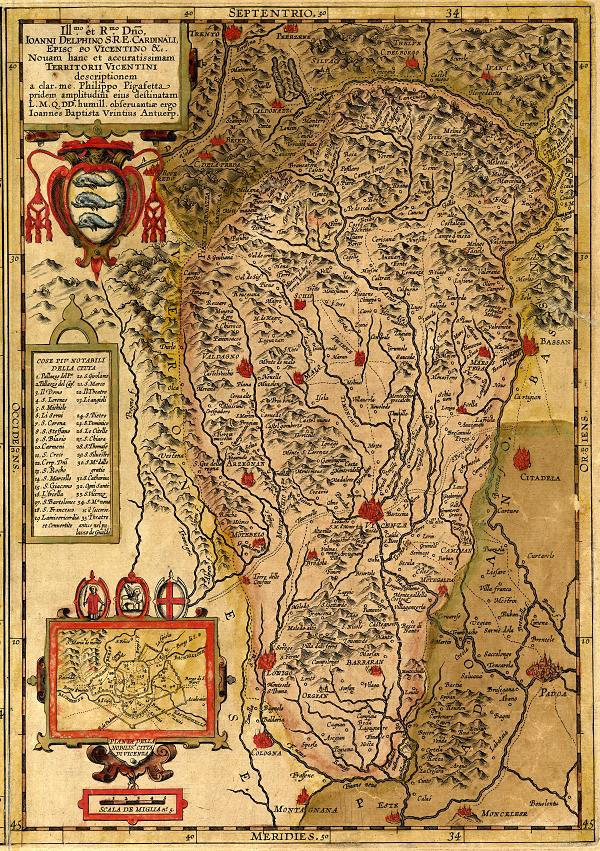
Map of the Vicentine territory. From Filippo Pigafetta, Novam hanc et accuratissima Territorii Vicentini descriptionem, in Abraham Ortelius, Theatro del mondo, Antwerp, 1608. Vicenza, Biblioteca Civica Bertoliana.

Although the end of the Middle Ages and the onset of the modern era are conventionally placed in the late 15th century (the fall of Constantinople or the discovery of America), for the history of the Veneto—and Vicenza in particular—the historical turning point can be set at the early 15th century. This was when Venice became a state governing a significant mainland domain that endured for four centuries. It was a largely secular state, with religious authority subordinate, independent of any empire, and governed by an aristocratic but no longer feudal system, balancing central power with relative local autonomy.

With its devotion of 1404, Vicenza’s ruling class seemed to grasp this shift, choosing to escape personal feudal lordships and join a modern state.

=== 15th–18th centuries ===
==== Population and economy in the modern era ====
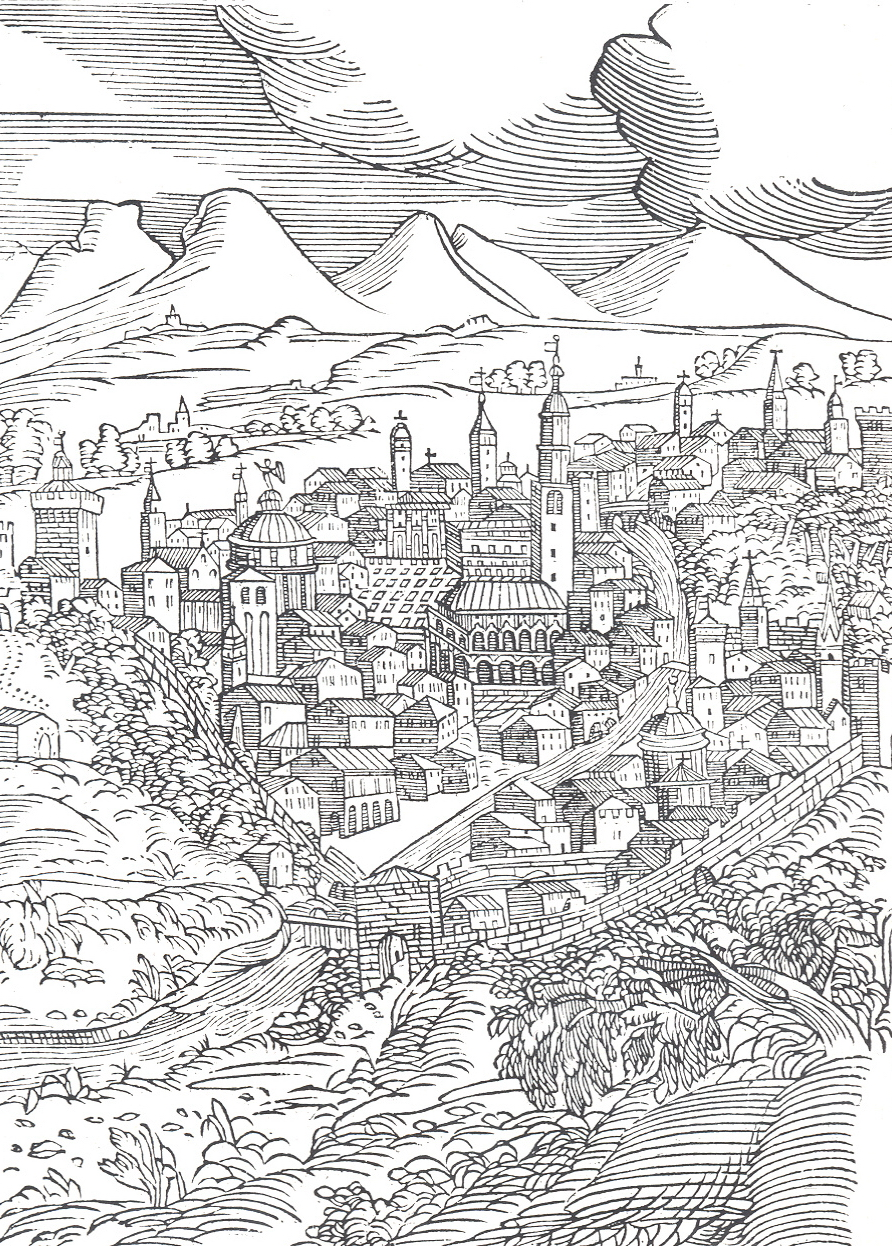
The city in 1604

Though reliable data are lacking, it is reasonable to assume that, as across Europe, Vicenza experienced steady demographic growth from the year 1000 until the mid-14th century. Evidence includes the construction of new walls, which the Scaligers built between 1365 and 1370 to enclose the suburbs that had expanded beyond the early medieval walls.

The construction of these walls also indicates that, soon after the plague of 1348–50, which decimated a third of Europe’s population, repopulation began in the city, continuing with slow numerical growth until the end of the 18th century.

Demographic, economic, and social balances remained extremely fragile throughout this period, alternating between slow growth, crises caused by famines and epidemics, and periods of relative stability.

A strong correlation existed among these three factors. An economy like Vicenza’s, entirely based on minimally diversified agricultural production with limited capacity for accumulation, depended on climatic and meteorological conditions. Numerous years of frost, excessive heat, relentless rains, or drought are recorded. When multiple adverse years followed, production was so meager that cereal prices rose to levels unaffordable for the poorest classes. This naturally impacted population growth: partial and localized demographic data show reduced marriages and birth rates and increased mortality during crises.

Impoverishment struck the countryside, where peasants lacked means to replant fields at the season’s start and were forced to borrow from city lords, to whom they owed rent payments, and from usurers, often the same individuals. Hunger and social insecurity fueled widespread theft and crime.

Famine also affected the city, where crowds of starving people flocked to beg and seek aid from the commune, which was better organized and had more resources than rural communities. The commune, concerned about social tensions arising from need, responded with all available means: it raised taxes and borrowed from the mount of piety to provide subsidies, while prohibiting the poor from begging and expelling non-residents.

The patrician families governing the commune were alarmed that famines undermined their interests. This was the period when they built Vicenza’s grandest and most opulent palaces, funded almost entirely by land rents from agricultural production, livestock, and tenant fees.

Thus, in 1590—one of the most challenging times, during a terrible three-year period when wolves reached the city—the Podestà and Council resolved to extend aid to the countryside, “not so much for the benefit of countless miserable people, who, having harvested nothing due to the year’s barrenness, face the danger, indeed near certainty, of starvation, but for the benefit of all citizens who, lacking the territory, would consequently be deprived of their incomes”. A special magistracy, the Presidents of Grain, oversaw the distribution of subsidies.

Another scourge, often following famines, was plague, which devastated an already weakened population. It struck the Vicentine territory recurrently from the early 14th century to 1631, when the city fulfilled a vow to Our Lady of Monte Berico. Based on the knowledge of that era, it is unclear if all the outbreaks were plague: chronicles labeled as such any rapidly spreading contagious disease leading to death. Beyond these episodes, in an environment with severe hygiene deficiencies and weakened people, the risk of contracting and dying from infectious diseases was endemic.

In the second half of the 18th century, Vicenza, like much of Europe, underwent the demographic transition, reducing both mortality and birth rates. In the northern countryside, especially hilly areas where small peasant property persisted, this led to population growth, while in the plains, the natural growth remained stable, underscoring the influence of social factors on demographics.

==== Firstborn daughter of the Serenissima ====
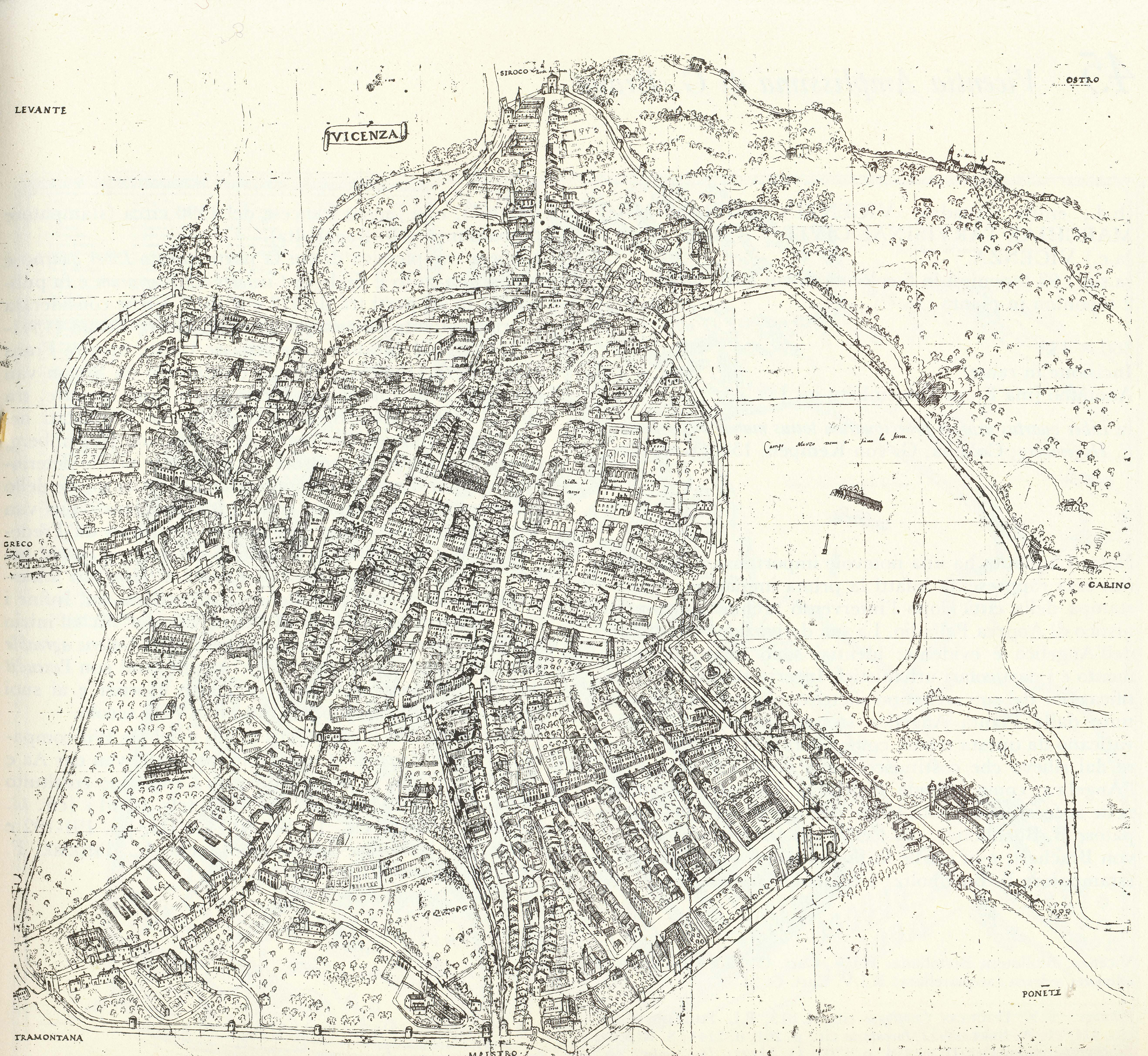
The city of Vicenza in the Pianta Angelica, 1580, drawn by G.B. Pittoni

After a brief period of communal freedom (1259–1266), Vicenza was always subject to more powerful neighboring cities. It was never conquered by force but rather surrendered, more or less voluntarily: in ‘custodia’ to Padua in 1266, in recognition of imperial authority represented by Cangrande della Scala in 1311, to Gian Galeazzo Visconti in 1387, and finally to the Republic of Venice in 1404.

Each instance was shaped by contingent factors, such as the prospect of inevitable defeat due to an inability to compete militarily. Generally, however, the decision to surrender to one regional power or another was made by Vicenza’s ruling class—formally by the City Council—convinced that their interests would be better safeguarded by anticipating the likely victor in a conflict and initiating negotiations early, rather than awaiting events.

This choice was particularly astute in 1404, when the Carraresi of Padua appeared as the emerging regional power (having conquered Verona), while the Republic of Venice had not yet explicitly declared its ambition to become a mainland state. By dedicating itself to the latter, Vicenza’s aristocracy legitimized its rule and, in return, secured guarantees to maintain its laws, magistracies, and the dominance of the families governing the city.

==== Faithful daughter of the Serenissima ====
Loyalty to the Serenissima characterized Vicenza—and its territory as a whole—throughout the subsequent period, during which Venice, the youngest of Italy’s mainland states, fought to preserve and expand its territory through arms and skillful diplomacy, forming and dissolving alliances.

Thus, when the Mainland was invaded in 1413 by the armies of Sigismund, King of Hungary and Emperor of the Holy Roman Empire, the besieged cities of Bassano, Marostica, Vicenza, and Lonigo fortified their walls and resisted in Venice’s name. When Venice, hostile to the pope, boycotted the Council of Constance in 1414, and conversely supported the pope at the Council of Florence in 1434, Vicenza’s bishop aligned with other Venetian bishops in supporting Venice. When the Carraresi and Scaliger heirs claimed their ancient lordships’ rights, the Vicentines ignored them, just as they opposed the Visconti in their war with Venice.

A brief infidelity occurred in 1509, when the world seemed united in the League of Cambrai, led by Pope Julius II, against the Serenissima. After Venice’s defeat at Agnadello, Vicenza’s aristocrats opened the city’s gates to an imperial contingent led by Leonardo Trissino, only to regret it within months and welcome the return of Venetian troops with relief. Even then, the lower classes and middle bourgeoisie, though hardly favored by the Dominante, demonstrated loyalty to San Marco, paying a heavy price—far greater than the city’s—for the brutality of enemy troops.

==== Privileged by privilege ====
Vicenza’s status as the first Mainland city to devote itself to Venice ensured privileged treatment in subsequent centuries, far more favorable than that accorded to cities such as Verona and Padua, which were taken by force. These advantages were formalized in the Privilegium civitatis Vicentiae of 1404, renewed in 1406 after the war against Padua. Both versions, despite differences, were a significant success for Vicenza, particularly in ratifying its dominance over nearly the entire countryside, from which the city’s aristocracy drew resources to sustain its high standard of living.

These agreements, based on maintaining the Vicentine ruling class in power, benefited both parties. Exercising sovereignty was a low-cost option for Venice: its personnel in Vicenza consisted only of the podestà it appointed, a captain, three judges, two chancellors, and a few constables, whose costs were borne by the city.

Venice held supreme authority and the right to intervene in extraordinary administrative matters. Formally, it had the arbitrium—the power to create, interpret, modify, and enforce laws—but with the Privilegium, it committed to respecting Vicenza’s laws, both existing and newly established. This commitment was guaranteed by the Vicentines’ right to appeal to Venetian judicial bodies, which on several occasions overturned acts by the podestà—and even the doge—that violated the city’s statutes.

Venice also held supreme civil jurisdiction and criminal authority, but its judges were required to follow Vicentine laws, relying on Vicenza’s notaries to draft documents per local norms. These norms primarily comprised the statutes, rural administration laws, and well-established, though unwritten, customs.

==== 16th-century wars in the Mainland ====
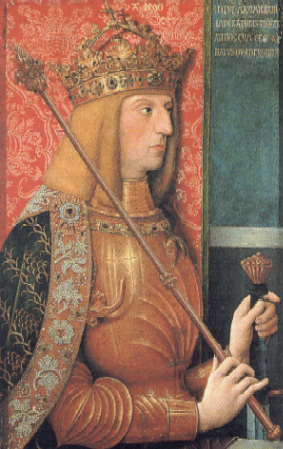
Official portrait of Maximilian I, first Imperator Romanus Electus.

The Vicentine territory was invaded again in 1509 during the War of the League of Cambrai. If victorious, the allied states planned to divide the Mainland: Vicenza and the Veneto were to be absorbed by the Holy Roman Empire.

The League’s French forces routed the Venetians at the Battle of Agnadello, while the Ferrarese fleet destroyed Venice’s at the Battle of Polesella. Facing defeat and unable to counter the opposing powers, the Republic evacuated its Mainland domains, freeing the cities from their obligation of allegiance.

Frightened by the enemy army’s advance—or perhaps hoping for greater gain—on 5 June, Vicenza’s aristocrats, led by the powerful Trissino and Trento families, opened the city’s gates to a small force led by the exile Leonardo Trissino, who entered in the name of Emperor Maximilian, though without his explicit mandate. The popular classes, in both city and countryside, demonstrated loyalty to San Marco, staging uprisings in Borgo San Pietro. Highlanders from the Altopiano attacked the imperial army descending the Valsugana, halting Maximilian’s advance at Marostica, forcing him back to Trento.

As League troops converged on Vicenza, disregarding agreements with local families and engaging in abuses, Venice launched a counteroffensive in mid-July 1509 to reclaim occupied territories. On 17 October, the emperor arrived, greeted with pomp and displays of allegiance, but the Vicentine aristocracy was already regretting its choice from four months earlier. On 13 November, the City Council resolved to send a delegation to the doge to reaffirm loyalty to Venice and negotiate immediate resubmission. Ten days later, the city opened its gates to troops led by Provveditore Andrea Gritti, who expelled the imperial garrison after a battle fought within the citadel.

Three months later, the League of Cambrai dissolved following the withdrawal of its main proponent, Pope Julius II, who turned against France. The ensuing years saw rapidly shifting alliances, and the Vicentine territory was invaded multiple times. The Treaties of Noyon and Brussels ended the war in 1517, and peace was fully restored after 1523 with a treaty between Charles V and Venice. The Mainland, up to Bergamo, remained under the Serenissima until its fall in 1797, and the Republic avoided the conflicts that disrupted Europe between the 16th and 18th centuries.

For the Vicentine territory, peace meant political stability and the city’s continued supremacy over the countryside.

==== The Ottoman threat and Venice’s decline ====
Beyond its intent to avoid continental wars, a more pressing reason pushed the Serenissima to the margins of European politics. The 16th century marked the beginning of Venice’s loss of maritime and Eastern trade primacy. The circumnavigation of Africa and the colonization of the Americas shifted Europe’s axis from the Mediterranean to Atlantic powers: Portugal, Spain, and later Holland, France, and England. Meanwhile, the Ottoman Empire, after the conquest of Constantinople, sought to expand into the eastern Mediterranean islands, North Africa, and the Balkans.

Over a century and a half, the Republic lost most of its Sea Domains: Cyprus, the Morea, Candia, and smaller Mediterranean islands. It consequently lost trade revenues, no longer supported by control of ports and stopovers, and required constant funds to arm fleets, fortify defenses, and occasionally pay ransoms or secure temporary truces. This money came from the Mainland, with Vicenza periodically contributing tens of thousands of ducats to sustain Venice’s wars and peaces. In turn, the city recouped these costs from the countryside.

==== Protestant ideas and the Council of Vicenza ====
In the first half of the 16th century, Protestant ideas spread across Europe. Initially underestimated, they became a concern for Pope Paul III, who, as Martin Luther and others had long demanded, convened an ecumenical council, first in Mantua and then, in 1537, in Vicenza. Despite the Vicentines’ lack of enthusiasm—housing prelates and their entourages posed logistical and financial challenges, and the designated venue, the cathedral, was still incomplete—the city set to work.

Various issues—tensions between France and the Empire, differing intentions for the council’s agenda—delayed its opening, and the venue was eventually moved to Trent, where it began in December 1545. The primary reason for the relocation was the Republic of Venice’s opposition: a key council goal was uniting Christian princes against the Ottoman Empire, with which Venice was negotiating a separate peace (concluded in 1540).

==== A minor history ====
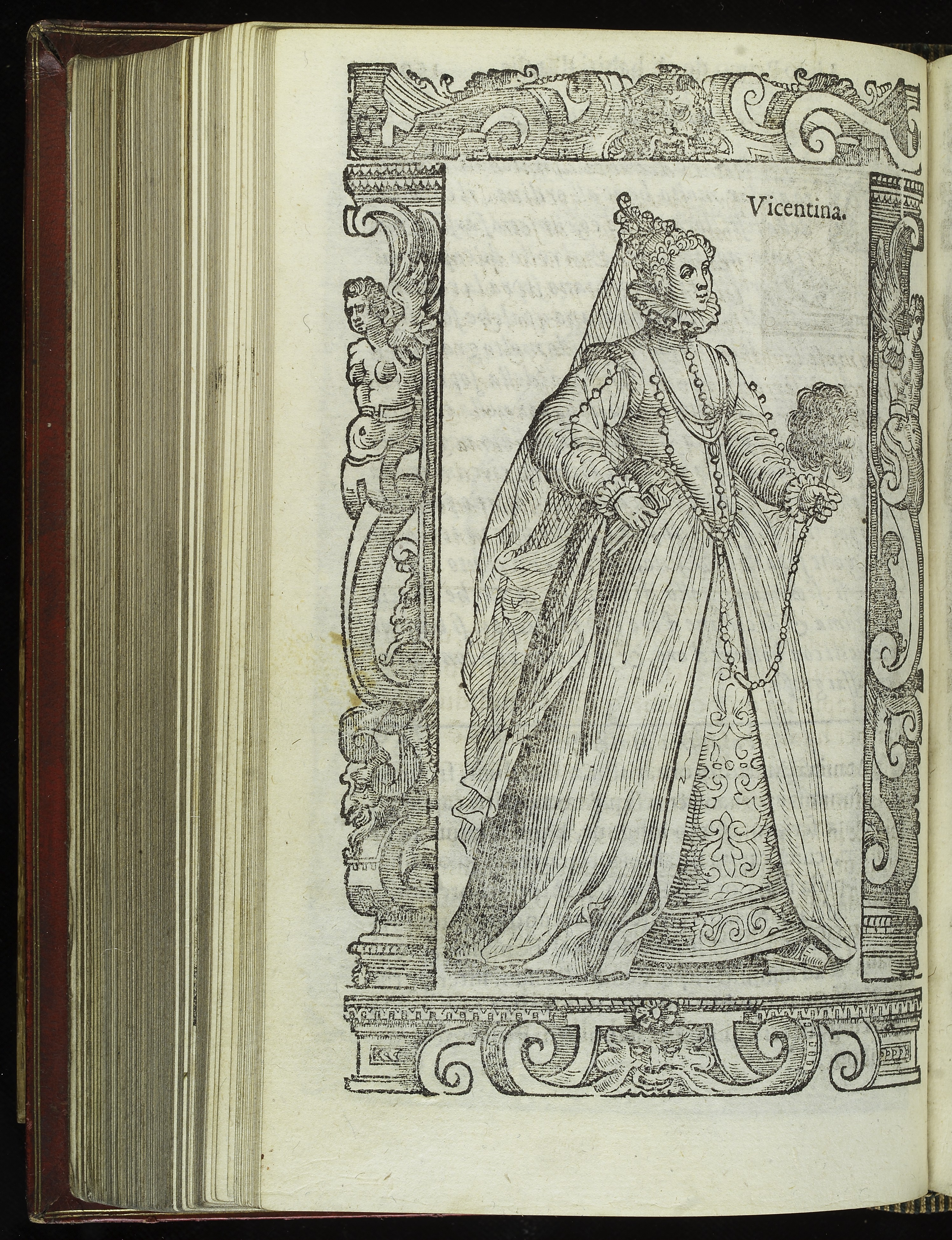
Attire of a noblewoman from Vicenza in the Renaissance period.

Already subject to others in the Middle Ages, during the four centuries of Serenissima rule, Vicenza was merely a subordinate city, passively enduring the events in which Venice was the protagonist, with neither the ability nor the will to resist this condition.

The city’s aristocracy, which had chosen this subjugation, countered the inevitable frustration by crafting and nurturing myths of nobility and maximizing the advantages of their position relative to the countryside.

Thus, in 1783, Maccà described Vicenza as a “most noble and ancient city … older not only than Rome but even Padua … one of the oldest and most glorious cities, encompassing the March of Treviso,” reviving legends of its origins and a well-established tradition. From the 16th century onward, this tradition was enriched with legendary family histories, all striving to root their nobility in ancient times. In the long period after the 14th-century lockout, when the right to sit in the City Council and hold public office was hereditary, though alienable, the antiquity of a lineage and the purity of blood were the accepted basis for family preeminence.

Another response to the frustration of having little influence within the Republic was for Vicenza’s aristocracy to emulate the Venetian patriciate in lifestyle, splendor, and especially the commissioning of visually striking palaces and villas. Vicenza thus filled with imposing monumental buildings, though often scaled back from grand initial designs or completed with significant delays due to funding shortages.

In the 16th and 17th centuries, as in many Italian cities, life in Vicenza unfolded in a climate of tension and violence, dominated by a quarrelsome aristocracy often implicated in murders, brawls, vendettas, and scandals (as depicted in Manzoni's historical accounts of Lombardy in The Betrothed). These acts of violence reflected and stemmed from widespread social, religious, and political-economic unrest, as evidenced by numerous letters from Vicenza's Rectors to the heads of the Council of Ten in Venice. Nobles with their bravi clashed and acted above the law: the Trissino, Cordellina, Cavalcabò, Porto, da Schio, and others.

==== Renaissance and classical architecture ====
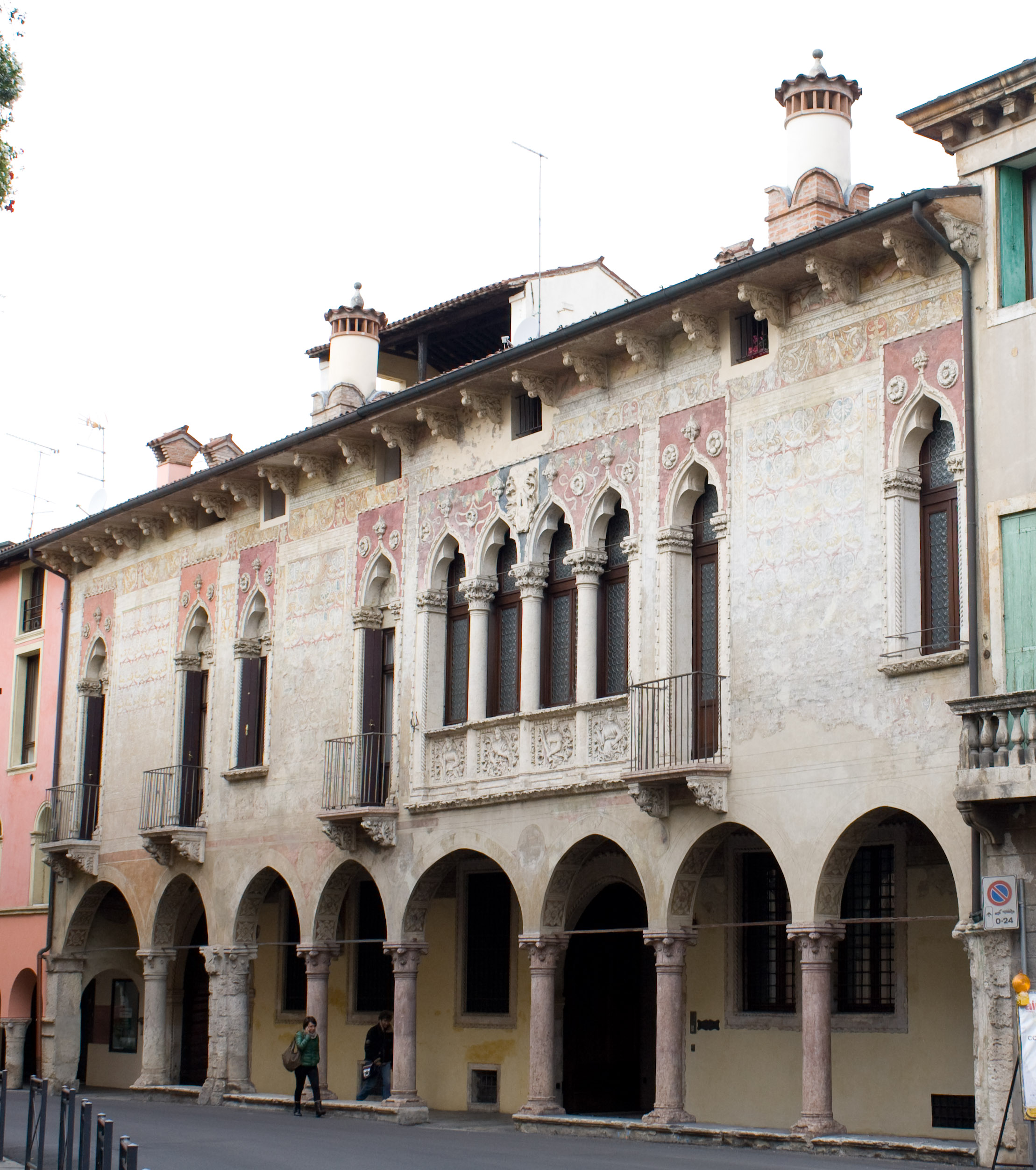
Palazzo Regaù, in Borgo San Pietro (now Corso Padova), mid-15th century.

The Vicentine Middle Ages were a time of constant conflict and shifting power, resulting in a paucity of private architecture. However, by the 15th century, refined and large-scale palaces emerged—those of the Braschi, the Ca’ d’Oro, Sesso, Garzadori, and Regaù, to name a few—built in the flamboyant Gothic style, aiming to rival the palaces of the Dominante.

Vicenza’s originality shone in the 16th century with the rise of Andrea Palladio, who left an invaluable legacy of ideas, realized primarily in the palaces that enriched the historic center and in lavish Venetian villas. Among his major works are the Basilica Palladiana, the Teatro Olimpico, the Palazzo Chiericati, and the Villa La Rotonda, located just outside the city.

The Palladian tradition was continued in Vicenza by Vincenzo Scamozzi and other architects into the 19th century, while Palladianism spread across Europe.

==== Fall of the Republic of Venice and the Provisional Municipality ====
In the 1790s, the ideas of the French Revolution began to spread in Vicentine society. However, it was Napoleon’s Italian Campaign of 1796 that sparked debate about potentially overturning the political system under which Vicenza had lived for four centuries.

Revolutionary ideals were embraced by individuals from various social strata, who later formed the core of the Democratic Municipality: representatives of the city’s aristocracy (such as Antonio Trissino, Felice Piovene, Giacomo Breganze, and Giovanni Scola), who had never accepted subordination to Venice; entrepreneurs, merchants, and professionals from the bourgeoisie, increasingly supplanting the nobility; and, though rare, people of humble origins and clergy members.

In June 1796, the Republic of Venice, aware of its weakness and determined to remain neutral in the conflict between Napoleon and the Habsburg Empire, permitted troop movements across the Mainland. Throughout the year, the Vicentine territory saw French and Austrian forces moving, settling, requisitioning, and conducting military operations, including the Austrians’ defeat at the Battle of Bassano.

In early 1797, the French army advanced through the Mainland, occupying one center after another. On 27 April 1797, three hundred French soldiers under General Giuseppe Lahoz Ortiz entered Vicenza after the Venetian captain Gerolamo Barbaro fled the city stealthily at night without a fight. Immediately, the Jacobins, or pro-French factions, declared the existing city government defunct and established a Provisional Municipality of 34 members, who solemnly swore to “uphold Liberty, Justice, Equality, and Virtue” (notably omitting Fraternity) while respecting the Catholic religion. The Municipality promptly adopted measures to gain popular favor, such as price reductions, abolition of duties, and elimination of noble titles.

The city center filled with revolutionary and pro-French symbols: a tree of liberty was erected in Piazza dei Signori, parades featured tricolor flags and Phrygian caps, and the traditional Rua was democratized. In the following month, smaller centers in the territory followed the capital’s example.

The Republic of Venice fell on 12 May 1797, and a Provisional Municipality replaced the doge in the Ducal Palace. Immediately, Mainland cities rebelled against Venice’s authority and established their own municipalities. To maintain order, on 16 June 1797, Napoleon issued a decree creating seven central governments in the former Venetian Mainland to coordinate the municipalities in various communes.

Vicenza became the seat of the Vicentine-Bassanese Central Government, which, despite their protests, included Bassano and the Seven Comuni, which had remained autonomous from Vicenza for four centuries, directly under Venice. The government's pursuit of reforms that conflicted with prevailing economic and social structures led to widespread discontent, worsened conditions for entire classes of people (e.g., thousands of domestic workers suddenly lost their jobs), and caused an economic decline.

A vicious cycle emerged, forcing the central government to adopt increasingly unpopular measures, such as requisitions and forced loans (a 400,000 Venetian lire levy on 10 May 1797), to meet rising costs. It also alienated the previously cooperative clergy by curbing their privileges. Further obstacles came from the French, on whom the government relied, who tried to conscript young people for the German campaign, took silverware from churches, and looted the mounts of piety.

The situation grew increasingly critical and was on the verge of collapse when, on 17 October, it was unexpectedly resolved: with the Treaty of Campo Formio, Napoleon ceded the Veneto to the Austrians. They entered Vicenza on 19 January 1798, greeted by cheering crowds. The Municipality’s leading figures were arrested, exiled, or chose to follow Napoleon’s armies.

== Contemporary era ==
With the arrival of the French in 1797 and the fall of the Republic of Venice, the Veneto region underwent a profound transformation. The political system based on the oligarchy of the Venetian patriciate was considered so outdated that, when the Congress of Vienna restored the previous order, it did not even contemplate the revival of the Serenissima.

Among the various theories on the periodization of historical eras and the dating of the end of the modern era and the beginning of the contemporary one, one can adopt the most conventional approach, which points to the regime change brought about by the French Revolution—in this case, the Fall of the Republic of Venice—as the most fitting for the Veneto and Vicenza.

=== Vicenza from the fall of the Venetian Republic to annexation to Italy ===
==== Vicenza and the French Empire ====
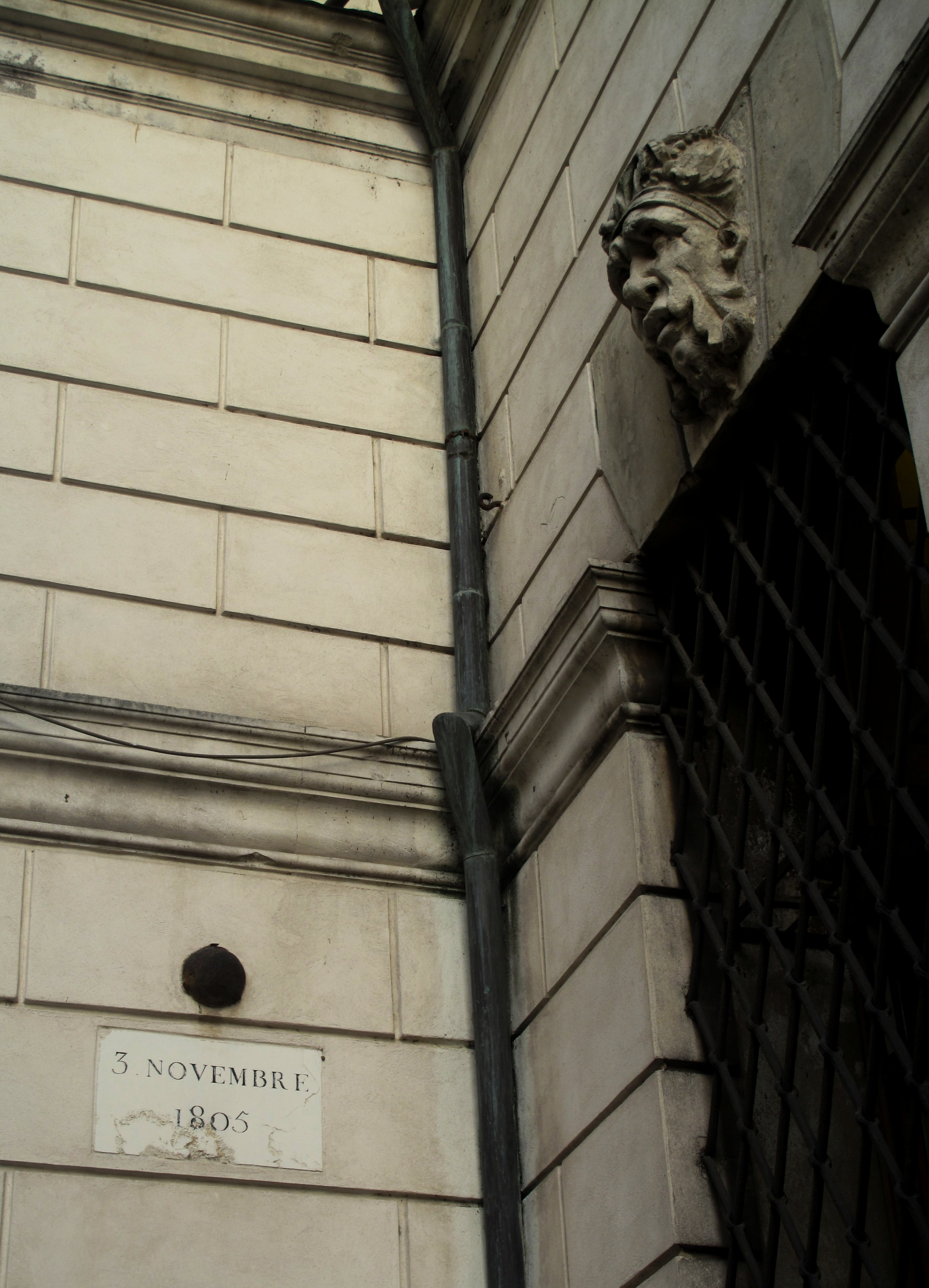
Vicenza, Palazzo Loschi Zileri Dal Verme on Corso Palladio. Cannonball embedded in the facade during Franco-Austrian clashes on 3 November 1805

After a brief period of French occupation (from April 1797 to January 1798) in Vicenza and the Veneto, the Austrians took over under the terms of the Treaty of Campo Formio, warmly welcomed by the Vicentines. Bishop Peruzzi openly aligned with the Austrians, who aimed to promote "the resurgence of holy morality and the free exercise of the Catholic religion". They repealed many decisions made by the Provisional Municipality and restored the pre-Napoleonic status quo.

The French returned to the city for a few months between 1800 and 1801, but the Treaty of Lunéville handed Vicenza and the Veneto back to the Austrians. In the autumn of 1805, after defeating imperial troops at the Battle of Caldiero on 30 October, the French advanced toward Vicenza, entering almost without resistance on 4 November 1805, marking their third occupation. Following the Peace of Pressburg, which ceded the Veneto, Istria, and Dalmatia to France, Vicenza was annexed to the Kingdom of Italy—part of the First French Empire—and remained so until November 1813.

These eight years enabled various reforms. The administrative structure was organized into Departments, with Vicenza and its territory forming part of the Department of Bacchiglione. The Napoleonic Code, inspired by the principles of the French Revolution, was introduced, along with the civil registry (previously maintained by parishes) and the gendarmerie. Religious orders were suppressed, and many convents were closed. The city became the seat of new institutions: the Chamber of Commerce, the Gymnasium and the High School, the Justice of the Peace, and the Monte Napoleone, which absorbed many ecclesiastical properties and managed public welfare.

At the core of the new regime, subordinate to French authorities, was a new class of notable landowners, a new ruling elite born from the fusion of the old nobility and the rising bourgeoisie.

These reforms, combined with increased taxation and the imposition of mandatory military conscription, generated significant discontent. This unrest manifested in riots—in 1809, revolts across the Veneto were brutally suppressed by the French. The repression led to an apparent calm but also widespread draft evasion, numerous desertions, and a consequent rise in banditry.

==== Vicenza and the Kingdom of Lombardy-Venetia ====
Following French defeats, first in Russia and then at the Battle of Leipzig, there were public celebrations in the hope that a new government would bring a better life, the return of many exiles, and reduced tax burdens.

On 5 November 1813, the Austrians re-entered Vicenza, this time establishing a permanent presence. Their occupation was ratified by the Congress of Vienna, and in 1815, the entire region, including Vicenza, was incorporated into the new state, the Kingdom of Lombardy–Venetia, part of the Austrian Empire. French laws were replaced with Austrian ones, though not everything changed: for instance, burial regulations remained French, and other institutions retained their structure under new names; the administrative organization also stayed largely similar.

In 1816, Emperor Francis I of Austria visited Vicenza, during which the straight road of Campo Marzo and the Santa Libera bridge were constructed. The latter bore a plaque explaining its construction, now displayed in the gardens of the Teatro Olimpico.

The war period had not passed without impact, particularly regarding the political awareness developed, especially among the upper classes, notably the urban bourgeoisie. Compared to other cities, however, Vicenza remained relatively calm: a Masonic lodge and some Carbonari movements, such as the masenini centered in Verona, emerged. The Austrian police consistently suppressed insurrection attempts.

==== The Revolutions of 1848 in Vicenza ====
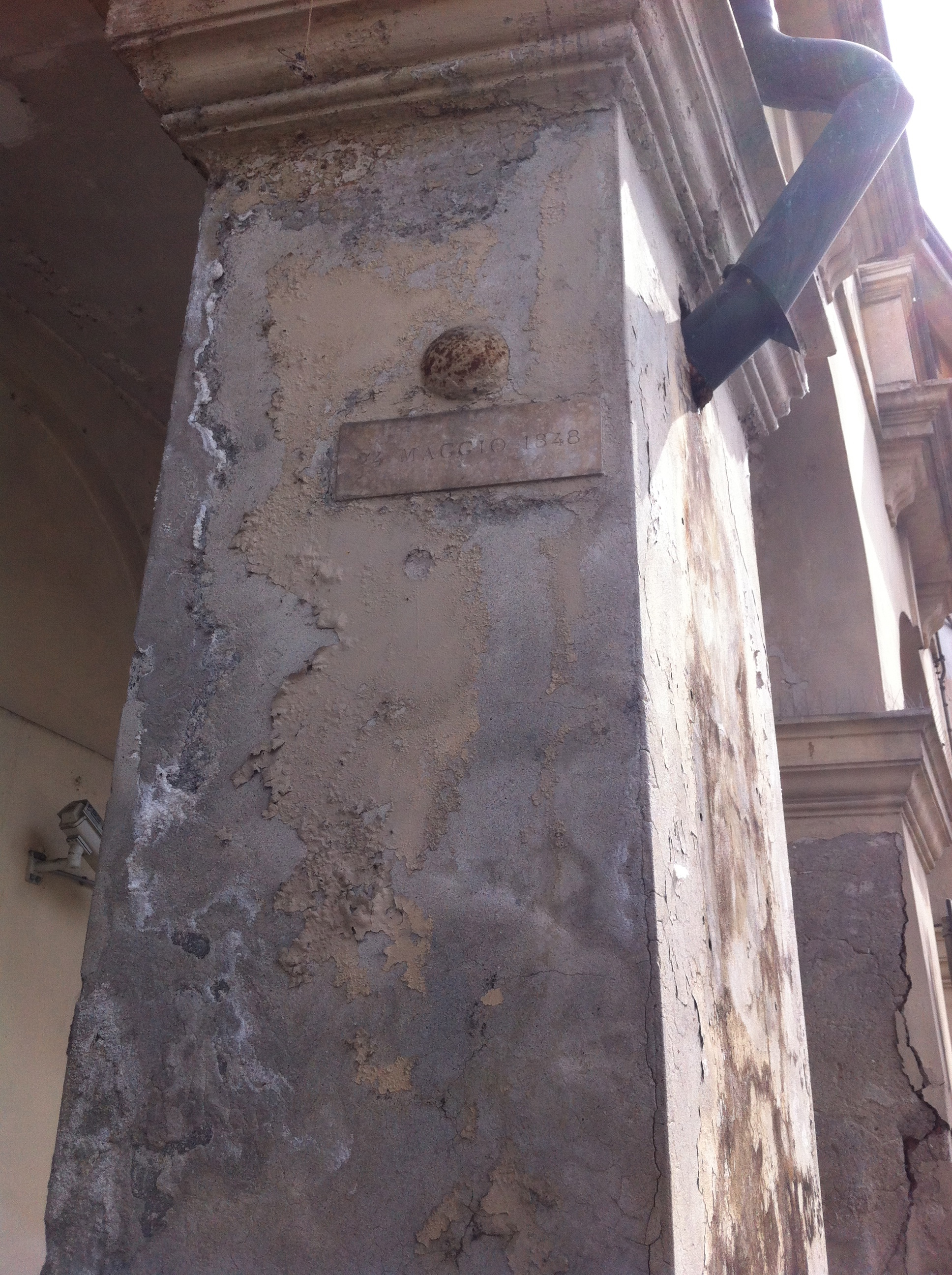
Austrian cannonball fired on 24 May 1848 during the assault on the city, embedded in one of the pillars in Piazza Castello.

In 1848, a wave of revolutionary movements erupted across Europe. From March, uprisings spread in Lombardy-Venetia, with Milan and Venice rebelling. On 23 March, the Kingdom of Sardinia attacked the Habsburg army, which retreated to the Quadrilatero. Vicenza was evacuated on 24 March, and a provisional government of about twenty individuals from all social classes was immediately formed, including Valentino Pasini, Giuseppe Fogazzaro, and Sebastiano Tecchio.

Proclamation of 1848 after the Fall of Vicenza

Vicenza, after a titanic struggle, has fallen.
Men and women, laypeople and priests, all fought tenaciously, all proved themselves Italian!
And the thousands of Austrians who bit the Vicentine dust know it well.
Nor were our losses few: for Vicenza would rather die than be desecrated.
But it seemed to Durando that the final slaughter of the Generous should be avoided, and it was decided to capitulate.
Thus, the Austrian colors (oh, sorrow!) wave in mockery or terror over those noble towers, and the Vicentine stones resound under the iron boots of the fugitives from Goito.
[...]
When Italian cities, renowned for their refined customs, wealth of artistic treasures, and envied monuments, fight in the Milanese and Vicentine manner, the National Cause cannot fail—it must triumph—it has already triumphed! Let us emulate our Brothers!

LONG LIVE ITALY. BLESSED FOREVER VICENZA.

— Manifesto of the Provisional Government of Modena, Reggio, Guastalla, etc., 14 June 1848

Initially, this group, influenced by Pasini, aligned with the Venetian government of Daniele Manin, transforming on 1 April into a Departmental Provisional Committee under Venice’s authority. After the defeat at the Battle of Sorio, however, the pro-Savoy faction led by Tecchio prevailed, sending a delegation to King Charles Albert. A plebiscite on 16 May resulted in 56,328 votes for immediate adhesion to the Kingdom of Sardinia (against 520 for delayed adhesion). This new political course received moderate support from parts of the clergy—Pope Pius IX had initially sent pontifical troops under General Giovanni Durando—to the extent that Bishop Giuseppe Cappellari declared, "we have blessed, we bless, and we will always bless your swords and your banners".

On 23 and 24 May, Field Marshal Joseph Radetzky attacked the city to suppress the insurrection. Vicentine volunteers and pontifical troops, led by Commander Giovanni Durando, repelled the Austrians, forcing their retreat to Verona. News of this heroic feat spread among the insurgent cities.

On 10 June, Radetzky attacked again with 30,000 soldiers and 50 cannons. The disparity was stark (11,000 defenders, including volunteers and soldiers, with only two cannons), and the Austrians positioned cannons on Monte Berico, threatening to bombard the city: Vicenza was now indefensible. Impressed by the courage and determination of the Berici defenders, Radetzky granted them surrender with the honor of arms, allowing the fighters to leave the city without being captured.

==== From 1848 to annexation to the Kingdom of Italy ====
On 11 June, the Austrian military occupation of Vicenza began. That same day, the city’s convents were converted into military hospitals, while surrounding villas became convalescent homes for battle survivors. The initial period was the harshest. Civil governance was restored only by late summer, with military authorities retaining all power in the interim, issuing continuous proclamations that made life difficult for citizens due to security concerns. Control later eased slightly, though impositions, taxes, and various levies continued to burden the population (for example, Monte Berico remained off-limits to civilians until 1857).

In 1857, the young imperial couple, Franz Joseph I of Austria and the renowned Elisabeth (Sissi), aged twenty, embarked on a propaganda tour of Lombardy-Venetia, visiting Venice, Padua, Vicenza, Verona, Brescia, and Milan, hoping to garner sympathy. All Italian cities greeted the Habsburg rulers with restrained, formal tributes and little warmth. In Vicenza, Franz Joseph restored Paolo Veronese’s "Supper of Saint Gregory the Great," damaged by Austrian soldiers during the Monte Berico uprisings, while Sissi visited the present-day Farina Institute, then housing 300 girls, welcomed by the bishop and the superior of the Dorothean nuns, Redenta Olivieri. However, Vicentine nobility boycotted the performances organized at the Teatro Olimpico.

Most members of the Vicentine Committee had gone into exile, from where they actively propagandized for annexation to Italy under the House of Savoy. These were mainly middle-class liberal-moderates—such as Alberto Cavalletto and Sebastiano Tecchio—united in the Central Committee of Venetian Emigration in Turin, wary of Mazzinians from the Action Party, who had some following in Vicenza. The professors of the Episcopal Seminary, Father Giovanni Rossi and Father Giuseppe Fogazzaro, went into exile in Florence.

Anti-Austrian demonstrations in the city and territory were frequent, always preempted or suppressed by the efficient Habsburg police, often aided by informants, leading to the arrest of patriots. Among those arrested were Giovanni Lucchini and G. Bacco, implicated in the Belfiore trial, sentenced to death but later amnestied.

The Third Italian War of Independence of 1866 "passed almost unnoticed in Vicenza, despite the city’s proximity to the military operations". On the night of 12–13 July, Austrian troops abandoned the city, and Italian troops under General Cialdini entered that morning. Ten days later, the king’s commissioner, Antonio Mordini, arrived with full powers. On 21 and 22 October 1866, the plebiscite formalized the Veneto’s annexation to the Kingdom of Italy.

In October, King Victor Emmanuel II visited Vicenza to award the Gold Medal of Military Valor for the heroism shown by patriots in defending the city.

==== The city’s new role in the 19th century ====
Since the arrival of the French in 1797, the relationship between Vicenza and its territory had fundamentally changed.

The Napoleonic Code and later the Austrian Civil Code of 1811 introduced the principle of equality for all citizens before the law, eliminating distinctions between city and countryside residents. Vicenza thus became the administrative capital of the territory, losing the dominance over rural communities it had maintained under the 1404 Privilege during the Serenissima’s rule. Upon annexation to the Kingdom of Italy, a Provincial Administrative Council was elected, distinctly separate from the city’s Municipal Council, with members of one barred from participating in the other.

The principle of equality, though not eliminating political and social disparities, laid the foundation for a renewal of the ruling class. With the end of the oligarchic system, which reserved government positions to a small number of patrician families, access to political and administrative roles shifted to candidacy in elections, supported by political parties.

=== From the annexation to Italy to World War I ===
==== Vicenza and Italian Politics ====
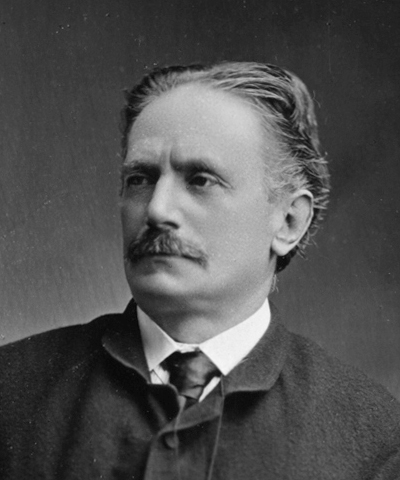
Vicentine deputy Paolo Lioy.

In November 1866, shortly after the Veneto’s annexation to Italy, the Vicentines participated in general elections to form the Chamber of Deputies. As the province was divided into seven electoral districts, smaller centers gained the ability to designate their representatives. The first deputy elected in the Vicenza district was Fedele Lampertico, the most prominent among Vicentine moderates, who served until 1870 and was appointed Senator of the Kingdom from 1873.

In 1867, the approval of the law on the liquidation of ecclesiastical property and suppression of religious orders troubled the consciences of Vicentines most loyal to the Church, and even Lampertico—who had supported the law the previous year—voted against it.

The Capture of Rome in 1870 inflamed passions and divided the Vicentines. The City Council unanimously celebrated the achievement of national unity, and local newspapers El Visentin, Il Brenta, and Il Giornale della provincia di Vicenza described the event in triumphant tones. Conversely, the clergy retreated into a silence that foreshadowed covert or overt opposition—particularly in smaller centers—to the central government.

In 1876, the fall of the Historical Right at the national level was reflected in Vicentine electoral districts—except Valdagno—which elected deputies from the Historical Left. In Vicenza, Giuseppe Bacco was elected but died a year later; partial elections returned a moderate, Paolo Lioy, who had been a deputy from 1870 to 1876. Supported by the Catholic electorate, fearful of socialist advances, the city elected liberal-moderate deputies (such as Felice Piovene and Antonio Teso) who remained in office until the First World War.

==== The government of the city from the annexation to the First World War ====
The first administrative elections, held under Italian legal provisions for the City Council of Vicenza on 29–30 September 1866, resulted in a moderate-conservative majority that held until the early 20th century.

During the 1870s, a highly intransigent Catholic force gradually organized in the city and province, opposing the bourgeois, secularist state, perceived as indifferent to the needs of the less affluent. Its press organs were Il Berico and, in the Breganze area, La Riscossa, led by the Scotton brothers. Socially, it was active in establishing Catholic workers’ and peasants’ societies, primarily charitable and mutual-cooperative in nature.

This force repeatedly attempted to elect representatives to the City Council but never achieved significant autonomous representation, resigning itself to supporting liberal-moderate lists. Only in 1896 was the first Catholic municipal junta formed, a unique experiment in Italy. However, in the still-heated climate of discord between the Savoy monarchy and the papacy, this led to unrest the junta could not manage, resulting in its dissolution by the central government months later and replacement with a moderate junta.

In 1891, the first socialist circle was founded in Vicenza, its activities progressing slowly due to internal conflicts and strong opposition from the robust Catholic movement, revitalized socially by Pope Leo XIII’s encyclical Rerum Novarum.

The alliance with moderates pulled Catholics into opposition when, in 1909, the conservative junta of Angelo Valmarana fell, and the City Council was won by the Union of Popular Parties, comprising radicals, socialists, and republicans. Four years later, liberals won the elections again, but without Catholic support, who were divided and confused despite the firm guidance of Vicenza’s new bishop, Ferdinando Rodolfi.

=== From the First to the Second World War ===
==== Vicenza and the Great War ====
Air raids on Vicenza during the First World War

1915

- September 14, 07:50 a.m.: 10 bombs, 10 injured; targets included the restaurant in Via Forti S. Lucia (now Via Zambeccari), henceforth called Alla Bomba, the main cemetery with minor damage, and the Farina Institute with minor damage.
- September 18, 08:00: 8 bombs, 5 at the Ponte degli Angeli washbasins, Maria Alberti died from injuries, 5 wounded.
- September 22nd: A bomb hit the prefecture in the loggia of the prefect's apartment.
- November 18, 10:00: Raid on market day, bombs dropped did not explode.

1916
In the spring, during an attack on Padua, 2 Vicentines were killed; during an attack on Bassano, 2 children were killed.

- May 18: 2 attacks, 10 bombs, 6 wounded.
- May 19: 2 raids; the first hits the cornice of Casa Zambelli in San Marco, exploding in the courtyard with minor damage; the second near the railway arsenal in Sant'Agostino and in a field in Gogna.
- May 20th, Saturday: 3-plane attack from 06:17 to 09:10, 1 bomb hit 3 soldiers of the 5th Subsistence Company at the Railway Arsenal in Via Cesare Lombroso, two died instantly, mourned the following Sunday with a solemn civic funeral.
- May 21: 2 raids, no damage.
- May 22nd: 1 raid, 2 bombs at the crowded train station, no casualties.
- May 25th: 2 raids, no damage.
- June 2: Raid from 06:00 to 08:55, 10 bombs; 1 wounded, significant damage to Palazzo Chiaradia (now Bonazzi) in Piazza Castello and Casa Belli in Corso Principe Umberto opposite Palazzo Trissino.
- June 11th: 2 raids from 08:30 to 09:50 with minor damage, from 11:49 to 12:06 with 5 deaths. The first raid hit the Reserve Military Hospital on the north side of the Episcopal Seminary above the surgical ward, minor roof damage; another bomb in Piazza G. Garibaldi killed 5 (2 Carabinieri, 3 civilians). The wounded were visited by the Bishop and the Mayor nearby.
- June 16th: 1 raid, 3 bombs, no damage.
- June 25th: 2 raids, no damage.
- June 27th: 2 raids, no damage.
- July 6–9, 11, 16-17, 22-23, 25, 27, 30: 12 raids, minor damage.
- August 4: At the Bassano railway station, an enemy plane bombs an ammunition train, killing one soldier.
- September 22–24: 6 raids, minor damage.
- October 13th: 2 raids, minor damage.
- December 1, Friday: Air raid from 11:40 to 12:16, 7 bombs; one near Porta S. Lucia, one in Borgo Scroffa, one near the military bakery in S. Felice, one exploded in the attic of S. Corona, one hit S. Biagio prison (then holding 19 inmates and 5 guards, no injuries, inmates transferred to Lonigo).

1917

- Night of February 18–19: The "M3" airship flew over Vicenza to bomb the Calliano railroad junction between Trento and Rovereto.
- Night of December 31, 1917 to January 1, 1918: 2 raids from 22:30 to 00:30; the first dropped 15 bombs, causing material damage, 4 deaths (2 military, 2 civilian), 15 injured (12 military, 1 civilian) in Campo Marzo and Via Pedemuro S. Biagio; the second caused 10 injuries, 3 serious, hitting the Reserve Military Hospital in Via Riale.

1918

- February 18th: Attack from 19:00 to 20:08, 18 bombs, 7 dead, 26 wounded. All the dead were soldiers, 4 in Via Carmini, 3 in Via del Quartiere; one bomb exploded near the hospital of S. Felice, one at Casa Viola in S. Agostino in front of the former hospital, others at the Foundlings Institute in S. Rocco and at the Female Orphanage of Mercy.
- February 20, 1918: 2 attacks; the first was stopped at Povolaro by anti-aircraft fire, the second evaded the defenses and dropped 8 bombs. One hit Palazzo Scroffa, killing 3 boys playing music who were unable to reach the shelter.

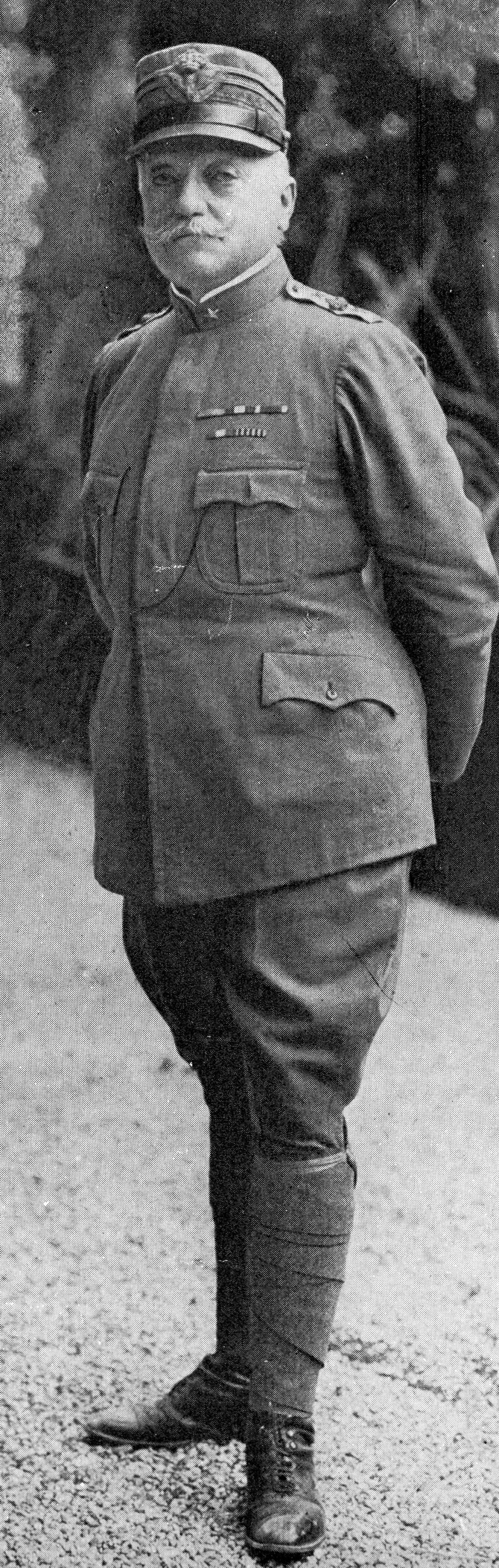
General Guglielmo Pecori Giraldi, commander of the First Army stationed in the Vicentine highlands, resided at Palazzo Trissino Baston.

On 23 May 1915, when Italy’s entry into the war was announced, Vicenza and its province were declared a "war zone" and immediately involved in operations. In the preceding days, military contingents were quartered in city colleges, and the Episcopal Seminary was designated a military hospital, serving nearly 150,000 wounded throughout the war. Blackout measures were enforced, and 4,000 residents of the upper Astico Valley were evacuated to the western province. On the announcement day, Piazza dei Signori filled with an excited crowd, addressed by Mayor Luciano Muzani from the Loggia del Capitaniato.

The first months of the war were relatively quiet, apart from some aerial raids, including one in the city in September. On 15 May 1916, the Strafexpedition began: Habsburg troops breached the Italian front, overran the highlands of Tonezza and Asiago, and descended to the plains, occupying Arsiero. Evacuation orders affected tens of thousands in the mountains and foothills, and for a few days, it seemed the capital would be included.

The following month, timely Italian reinforcements halted the Austrian advance, which retreated to more defensible positions. The situation stalemated for another year, with fierce battles yielding little territorial change. Vicenza lived under a constant sense of impending danger, underscored by near-daily aerial raids on the city and plains.

Life in the city was harsh: the historic center and suburbs were overcrowded with refugees and soldiers, firewood and coke for heating and cooking (the 1916–17 winter was among the century’s snowiest and coldest) were rationed, as were food and lamp oil. These hardships, combined with war fatigue, fostered growing detachment between soldiers and most of the population. Authorities exerted strong, often unjustified pressure against complaints, interpreted as defeatism.

The Battle of Caporetto in late October 1917 worsened conditions. Fear of an Austrian advance triggered another exodus of Vicentines—a significant portion of the urban bourgeoisie fled—making way for crowds of refugees and soldiers from the front. Supply issues intensified, exacerbated by the Supreme Command’s orders to requisition food depots and destroy industrial facilities to prevent their capture. The First Army commander, General Pecori Giraldi, stationed at Palazzo Trissino, coordinated with the French Army, arriving as reinforcements, to fortify the city’s surroundings, turning Vicenza into a vast construction site during the 1917–18 winter.

In 1918, the tide turned in Italy’s favor. The Battle of the Three Mountains in late January marked the Italian counteroffensive, boosting troop morale. On 3 February, they paraded in Vicenza in a grand demonstration. On 15 May, General Pecori Giraldi was granted honorary citizenship in the Monte Cengio trenches. Gradually, despite vigorous Austrian resistance, the entire territory was reclaimed. On 4 November, the armistice took effect, and Vicenza celebrated with massive demonstrations.

By Sovereign Decree of 28 March 1920, in recognition of Vicenza’s valor during the war, the city’s flag was awarded the Cross of Military Merit. To commemorate the city’s 743 fallen, the Piazzale della Vittoria was built at Monte Berico, offering a view of the mountains from the Little Dolomites to Monte Grappa, theaters of the Great War.

==== The post-war period and the rise of fascism in Vicenza ====
At the war’s end, Vicenza and its territory faced immense challenges shared across Italy—scarcity of essential goods, inflation, and rising living costs—compounded by extensive destruction, especially in mountainous areas, and the need for reconstruction and war damage compensation. Social problems were even more serious: widespread impoverishment contrasted with the enrichment of a few who profited from the war. This discontent manifested politically in 1919 during the first post-war general elections, the first held with universal male suffrage, featuring mass parties rather than individual notables.

In the province of Vicenza, the People’s Party—founded that year and garnering Catholic votes—won about 50% of the vote, leveraging its penetration through numerous parish organizations that combined religious, social, and political roles. In the city, this percentage was slightly lower, with the Italian Socialist Party also strong among anarchic middle classes and urban proletariat. The 1921 elections largely confirmed these two major parties but also elected a Vicentine fascist deputy.

The first Fascio di Combattimento was established in Vicenza in November 1920, attracting adherents—beyond students, particularly from the Rossi Institute—among the bourgeoisie who identified neither with mass parties nor the old ruling class, deemed incapable of ensuring social order. Fascism grew in 1921 when this Fascio allied with the agrarian Fasci of Lower Vicenza, providing squadrist support. It was aided by the inertia of the army, carabinieri, and civil authorities. That year, it was internally divided between a moderate wing, aligned with Mussolini’s shift to curb violence and punitive expeditions, and the squadrist faction.

In 1922, fascists carried out violent actions in Vicenza. In July and August, they assaulted the Labour Union and the Chamber of Labour, the Catholic and socialist union headquarters, respectively, and in September, they paraded through the city. On 14 October, they occupied Vicenza’s town hall, forcing the resignation of the socialist administration; on the night of 27–28 October, they seized the railway station, post office, and telephone exchange; the next morning, they took the prefecture, police headquarters, barracks, and municipal utilities. These actions, coinciding with the March on Rome, had a profound psychological impact, creating an impression of total state collapse and facilitating Mussolini’s rise.

==== The twenty years of Fascism in Vicenza ====
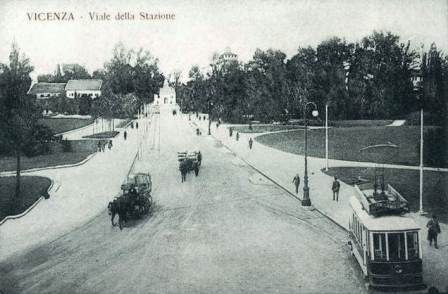
Station Avenue in the 1920s, in a vintage postcard

Following the dissolution of Vicenza’s city council, new administrative elections were called in 1923. Two lists were presented: one of fascists and liberals, and another agreed with some merchants. The victory of the former was partly due to the absence of local lists from the People’s Party, socialists, social democrats, and republicans, more from internal disputes than actual fascist pressure, which was stronger in smaller centers and rural areas. Voter turnout was below 30%.

In April 1924, during Italy’s last general elections before 1948, the two socialist lists in the city achieved a relative majority.

=== World War II ===
The Second World War severely impacted Vicenza, which suffered heavy damage from 12 Anglo-American bombardments between 25 December 1943 and 28 April 1945, targeting its railway station and airport. On 2 April 1944, the southern historic center was hit, destroying numerous buildings, including the Palladian Palazzo Civena and the city’s two main theaters, Teatro Verdi and Teatro Eretenio. On 17 and 18 November 1944, over two days, 25,000 devastating aerial bombs were dropped on the city’s northern quadrant, causing over 500 deaths. Many Vicentines vividly recall the evening of 18 March 1945, when an aerial raid relentlessly pounded the city with incendiary bombs, particularly intense in the historic center. That bombardment struck Vicenza’s heart: the Torre Bissara and Basilica Palladiana, whose roof burned all night and collapsed catastrophically, a severe blow to Vicentine pride.

Vicenza’s urban heritage suffered significant damage from the bombardments. Among monuments and historic buildings, severe damage was inflicted on the Cathedral, the Basilica of Saints Felix and Fortunatus, the churches of San Gaetano, Santa Corona, and San Filippo Neri, the Basilica Palladiana, the Arco delle Scalette, the Ca’ d’Oro, the Episcopal Palace, Palazzo Valmarana, Palazzo Trissino, the Palazzo del Monte di Pietà, and many other historic buildings. The Verdi and Eretenio theaters were destroyed and never rebuilt.

Civilian casualties numbered around 1,000 (some sources estimate 2,000).

==== The Vicentine Resistance ====
The Vicentine Resistance, an integral part of the Italian resistance movement, began historically between mid-June 1943 and 25 July 1945, with the formation of the "Interparty Antifascist Committee," comprising members of the Action Party, Italian Communist Party, and Italian Socialist Party.

Following the Armistice of Cassibile, in the three days after 8 September 1943, the Germans occupied central-northern Italy, including the Vicentine territory, amid widespread local dismay. By early October, the local branch of the National Liberation Committee was formed in clandestinity. The start of armed resistance was slow due to organizational difficulties, initial roundups, and harsh mountain weather. By late 1943, some formations existed in the foothills and highlands, composed of veteran antifascists, draft evaders, soldiers returning home after 8 September, and political cadres of various backgrounds. Some were short-lived or disbanded.

The resistance movement in Vicenza gained momentum in spring 1944, when the demands of civil society formed the basis for armed revolt. Strikes—from December 1943 to April 1944 in industrial centers from Vicenza to Bassano, Arzignano, and Piovene Rocchette—ignited the spark. Sometimes self-managed, sometimes influenced by the PCI or CLN, they heightened political awareness, coinciding with the start of the partisan period. These formations found support among the population, especially in mountainous areas such as the Sette Comuni. Interventions by the Italian Social Republic forces backfired, prompting many youths to join what began as little more than armed bands, later becoming brigades and divisions.

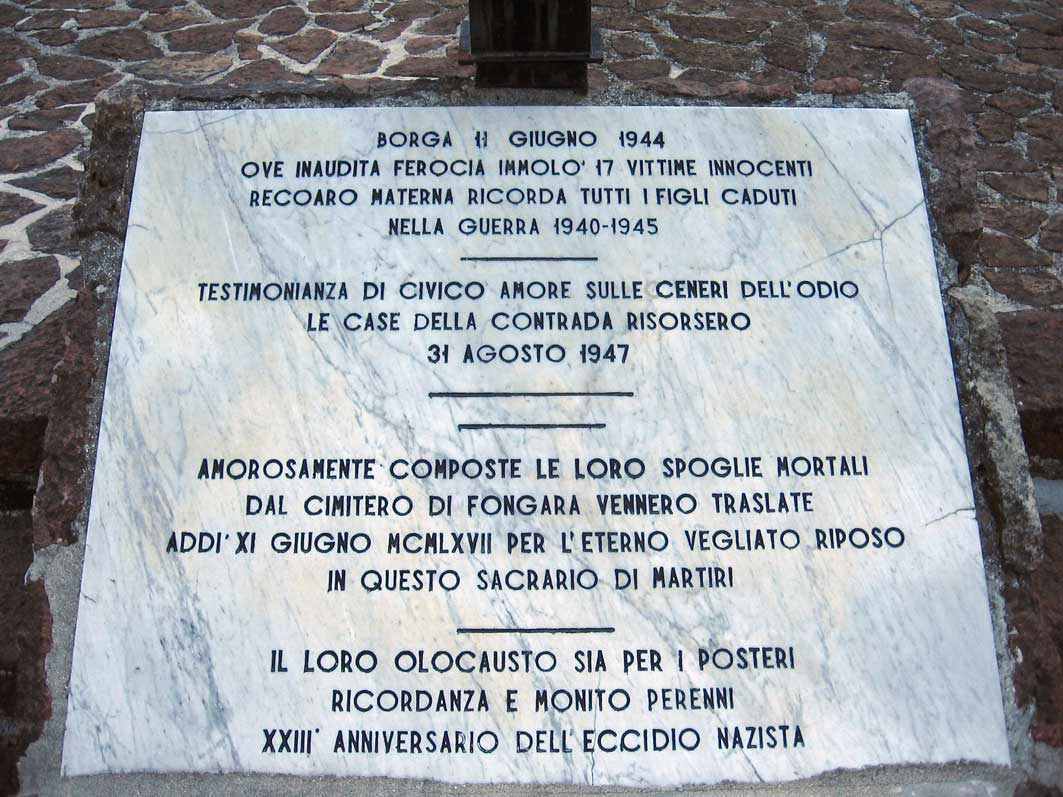
Plaque commemorating the Borga massacre, 11 June 1944, where 17 civilians were shot

Galvanized by prospects of imminent victory due to the Liberation of Rome, the Normandy landings, and the Red Army’s advance, partisan formations attacked in summer 1944, supported by the population. Nazi-fascists responded with roundups and summary executions, including the Borga massacre on 11 June 1944, the Valdagno massacre on 3 July 1944, and the Malga Zonta massacre on 12 August 1944. Overall, the partisan offensive was so intense and widespread that it significantly restricted German and fascist movements, confining them to cities and towns on the plains.

In autumn 1944, when hopes of a swift Gothic Line breakthrough faded, the tide turned, and Nazi-fascists launched a counteroffensive with heavy roundups and reprisals against the population. Many partisan brigades were disorganized or dispersed; most resistance leaders in the capital and towns on the plains were arrested. Mountain formations survived but were forced to halt guerrilla actions. During this period, the resistance’s political aspect strengthened. The PCI coordinated all partisan forces, while the Christian Democracy, backed by the local Church, ubiquitous in every village, engaged in armed activity, becoming a reference for all formations, not just Catholic ones, that did not align with the partisans. The valleys and mountains of Valdagno and Schio were under the control of the Garemi, the plateau, Grappa, and Bassano under the Catholic Monte Ortigara, and the plains under the Vicenza.

On 23 and 24 April 1945, all formations attacked, engaging in bloody battles until 4 May (the German Army surrendered at Caserta on 2 May), resulting in many deaths on both sides. During their retreat, German and fascist columns, attacked by partisans, committed further reprisals and massacres, such as the Pedescala massacre.

The war in the Vicentine territory concluded with a general insurrection, though the actions of politicized groups were often harsher than the population, yearning for peace, desired. The province of Vicenza had the highest number of fascists killed in the Veneto, mostly in the days following liberation; the Schio massacre is emblematic in this regard.

After the war, Vicenza was awarded the Gold Medal for the Resistance and promptly began reconstruction to restore the city’s appearance, which it retains today.

=== The post-war period and reconstruction ===
In the post-war period, from the 1950s, strong economic and industrial development made Vicenza one of Italy’s wealthiest cities.

==== Vicenza, World Heritage Site ====
Vicenza, the City of Palladio, was designated a UNESCO World Heritage Site on 15 December 1994. The UNESCO World Heritage Committee, meeting in Phuket, Thailand, included the city on the list based on two criteria:

1. Vicenza represents a unique artistic achievement in the many architectural contributions of Andrea Palladio, integrated within its historic fabric and creating its overall character. Scattered in the Veneto, the Palladian villas are the result of this Renaissance master’s architectural genius. The numerous variations of the villa pattern are evidence of Palladio’s constant typological experimentation, carried out by means of the reworking of classical architecture patterns.
2. Palladio’s works in the city of Vicenza and in the Veneto, inspired by classical architecture and characterized by incomparable formal purity, have exerted exceptional influence on architectural and urban design in most European countries and throughout the world, giving rise to Palladianism, a movement named after the architect and destined to last for three centuries.

== See also ==
- Roman Catholic Diocese of Vicenza
- History of religious life in Vicenza
- History of religious architecture in Vicenza
- University of Vicenza
- List of mayors of Vicenza
- Borgo Pusterla

== Bibliography ==
=== Primary sources ===
- Barbarano de' Mironi, Francesco (1649–61). Historia ecclesiastica della città, territorio e diocese di Vicenza [Ecclesiastical History of the City, Territory, and Diocese of Vicenza] (in Italian). Vol. Book V. Vicenza: Stamperia C. Bressan.
- Da Costozza, Conforto (1915). C. Steiner (ed.). Frammenti di storia vicentina (aa.1371-1387) [Fragments of Vicentine History (1371–1387)]. RIS, 2, XIII/1 (in Italian). Città di Castello.
- Ferreti, Ferreto de' (1908). C. Cipolla (ed.). Historia rerum in Italia gestarum ab anno MCCL ad annum usque MCCCXVIII [History of Events in Italy from 1250 to 1318]. Le opere di Ferreto de' Ferreti vicentino (in Latin). Roma.
- Godi, Antonio (1909). Giovanni Soranzo (ed.). Cronaca dall'anno 1194 all'anno 1260 [Chronicle from the Year 1194 to the Year 1260]. RIS, 2, VIII/2 (in Italian). Città di Castello.
- Maurisio, Gerardo (1914). Giovanni Soranzo (ed.). Chronica dominorum Ecelini et Alberici fratrum de Romano [Chronicle of the Lords Ecelino and Alberico, Brothers of Romano]. RIS, 2, VIII/4 (in Latin). Città di Castello.
- Smeregli, Nicolai (1921). Giovanni Soranzo (ed.). Annales Civitatis Vicentiae (anni 1200-1312) [Annals of the City of Vicenza (1200–1312)]. RIS, 2, VIII/5 (in Latin). Bologna.

=== Classical historiography ===
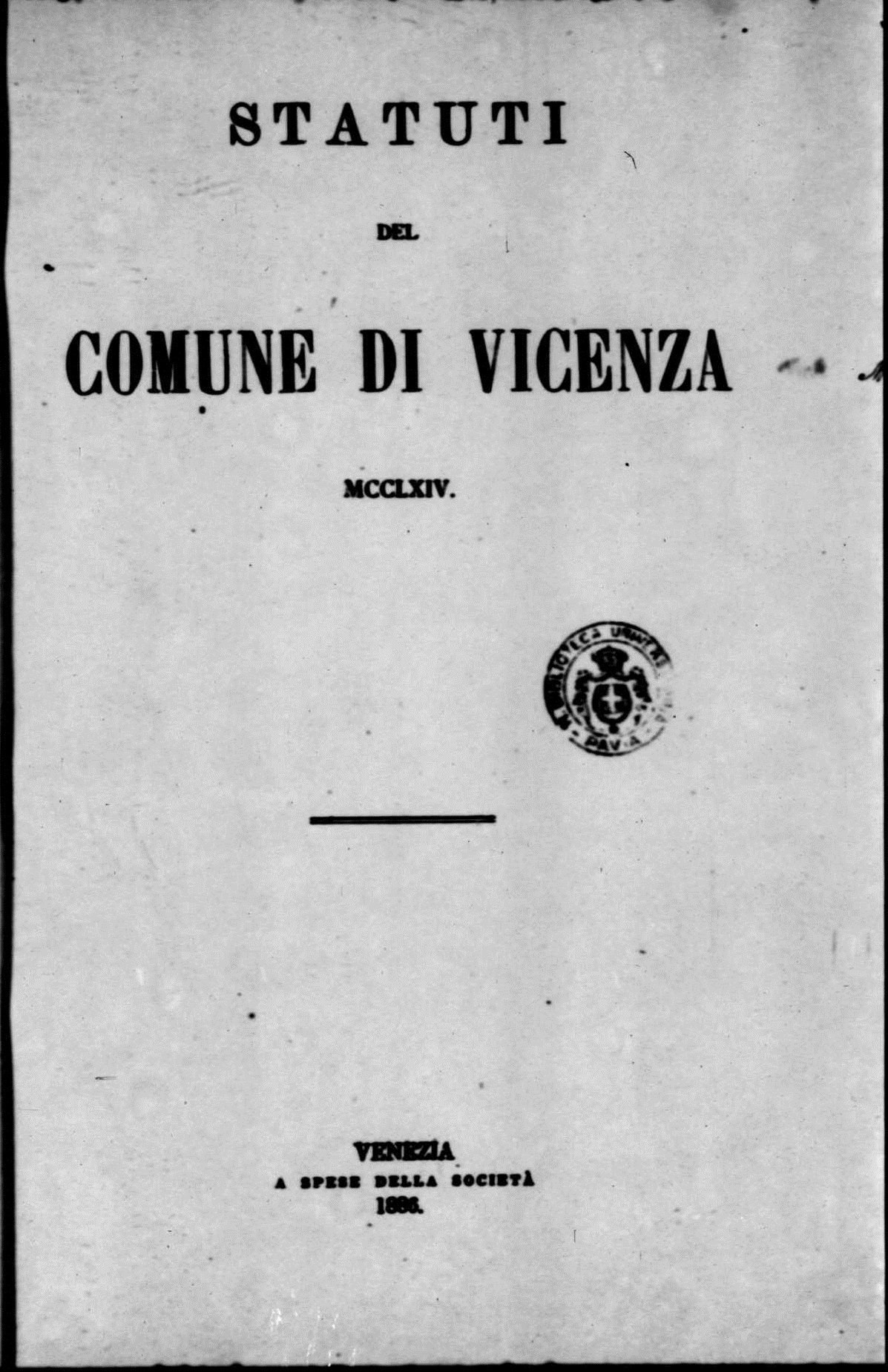
Fedele Lampertico, Statuti del Comune di Vicenza, 1886

- Castellini, Silvestro (1822). Storia della città di Vicenza, ove si vedono i fatti e le guerre de' vicentini così esterne come civili, dall'origine di essa città sino all'anno 1630 [History of the City of Vicenza, Where the Deeds and Wars of the Vicentines, Both External and Civil, Are Seen from the City’s Origin to 1630] (in Italian). Vicenza.
- Lampertico, Fedele (1883). I podestà di Vicenza. Anni 1200-1311 [The Podestàs of Vicenza. Years 1200–1311]. Scritti storici e letterari, II (in Italian). Firenze.
- Lampertico, Fedele (1886). Statuti del Comune di Vicenza [Statutes of the Commune of Vicenza] (in Italian). Venezia: Regia Deputazione veneta di storia patria.
- Maccà, Gaetano (1815). Storia del Territorio Vicentino [History of the Vicentine Territory] (in Italian). Vicenza.
- Pagliarino, Giambattista (1663). Croniche di Vicenza [Chronicles of Vicenza] (in Italian). Vicenza.
- Savi, Ignazio (1815). Memorie antiche e moderne intorno alle pubbliche scuole in Vicenza [Ancient and Modern Memories Regarding Public Schools in Vicenza] (in Italian). Vicenza.

=== Recent historiography ===
- La Basilica dei Santi Felice e Fortunato in Vicenza [The Basilica of Saints Felix and Fortunatus in Vicenza] (in Italian). Vicenza: Banca Popolare. 1979.
- Barbieri, Franco; Cevese, Renato (2004). Vicenza, ritratto di una città [Vicenza, Portrait of a City] (in Italian). Vicenza: Angelo Colla editore. ISBN 88-900990-7-0.
- Barbieri, Franco (2011). Vicenza: la cinta murata, 'Forma urbis' [Vicenza: The Walled Enclosure, 'Forma Urbis'] (in Italian). Vicenza: Ufficio Unesco del Comune di Vicenza.
- Brunetta, Ernesto (1991). "La Resistenza" [History of Vicenza, IV/1, The Contemporary Era]. Storia di Vicenza, IV/1, L'Età contemporanea [The Resistance] (in Italian). Vicenza: Neri Pozza editore.
- Castagnetti, Andrea (1988). "Vicenza nell'età del particolarismo: da Comitato a Comune" [History of Vicenza, II, The Medieval Era]. Storia di Vicenza, II, L'Età Medievale [Vicenza in the Age of Particularism: From County to Commune] (in Italian). Vicenza: Neri Pozza editore.
- Cisotto, Gianni A. (1991). "Dall'età napoleonica all'annessione all'Italia" [History of Vicenza, IV/1, The Contemporary Era]. Storia di Vicenza, IV/1, L'Età contemporanea [From the Napoleonic Era to Annexation to Italy] (in Italian). Vicenza: Neri Pozza editore.
- Cracco, Giorgio (2009). Tra Venezia e terraferma [Between Venice and the Mainland] (in Italian). Roma: Viella editore.
- Cracco Ruggini, Lelia (1988). "Storia totale di una piccola città: Vicenza romana" [History of Vicenza, Vol. I]. Storia di Vicenza, Vol. I [Total History of a Small City: Roman Vicenza] (in Italian). Vicenza: Neri Pozza editore.
- De Rosa, Gabriele (1991). "1915-18. II. La guerra nel Vicentino nelle lettere dei vescovi Ferdinando Rodolfi e Luigi Pellizzo" [History of Vicenza, IV/1, The Contemporary Era]. Storia di Vicenza, IV/1, L'Età contemporanea [1915–18. II. The War in the Vicentine Territory in the Letters of Bishops Ferdinando Rodolfi and Luigi Pellizzo] (in Italian). Vicenza: Neri Pozza editore.
- Del Negro, Piero (1991). "1915-18. III. Partecipazione dei vicentini allo sforzo comune" [History of Vicenza, IV/1, The Contemporary Era]. Storia di Vicenza, IV/1, L'Età contemporanea [1915–18. III. Vicentines’ Participation in the Collective Effort] (in Italian). Vicenza: Neri Pozza editore.
- Franzina, Emilio (1980). Vicenza, Storia di una città [Vicenza, History of a City] (in Italian). Vicenza: Neri Pozza editore.
- C.Fumian; A.Ventura, eds. (2004). Storia del Veneto [History of the Veneto] (in Italian). Laterza.
- Ghedini, Francesca (2004). "Una regione dell'Italia romana attraverso i suoi monumenti" [History of the Veneto]. Storia del Veneto [A Region of Roman Italy Through Its Monuments] (in Italian). Laterza. pp. 41–55.
- Grubb, James S. (1989). "Comune privilegiato e Comune dei privilegiati" [History of Vicenza, III/1, The Era of the Venetian Republic]. Storia di Vicenza, III/1, L'Età della Repubblica Veneta [Privileged Commune and Commune of the Privileged] (in Italian). Vicenza: Neri Pozza editore.
- Guiotto, Maddalena (1991). "Dal primo dopoguerra al 1943" [History of Vicenza, IV/1, The Contemporary Era]. Storia di Vicenza, IV/1, L'Età contemporanea [From the First Post-War Period to 1943] (in Italian). Vicenza: Neri Pozza editore.
- Giuseppe Gullino, ed. (2014). Storia di Vicenza, dalla preistoria all'età contemporanea [History of Vicenza, from Prehistory to the Contemporary Era] (in Italian). Vicenza: Cierre edizioni Istrevi.
- Lomastro Tognato, Francesca (1981). Spazio urbano e potere politico a Vicenza nel XIII secolo. Dal «Regestum possessionum» del 1262 [Urban Space and Political Power in Vicenza in the 13th Century. From the «Regestum possessionum» of 1262] (in Italian). Vicenza: Accademia Olimpica.
- Mantese, Giovanni (1952). Memorie storiche della Chiesa vicentina I, Dalle origini al Mille [Historical Memories of the Vicentine Church I, From Origins to the Year 1000] (in Italian). Vicenza: Accademia Olimpica.
- Mantese, Giovanni (1954). Memorie storiche della Chiesa vicentina, II, Dal Mille al Milletrecento [Historical Memories of the Vicentine Church, II, From 1000 to 1300] (in Italian). Vicenza: Accademia Olimpica.
- Mantese, Giovanni (1958). Memorie storiche della Chiesa vicentina, III/1, Il Trecento [Historical Memories of the Vicentine Church, III/1, The 14th Century] (in Italian). Vicenza: Accademia Olimpica.
- Mantese, Giovanni (1964). Memorie storiche della Chiesa vicentina, III/2, Dal 1404 al 1563 [Historical Memories of the Vicentine Church, III/2, From 1404 to 1563] (in Italian). Vicenza: Neri Pozza editore.
- Mantese, Giovanni (1982). Memorie storiche della Chiesa vicentina, IV/1 [Historical Memories of the Vicentine Church, IV/1] (in Italian). Vicenza: Neri Pozza editore.
- Marchini, Gian Paolo (1983). Vicenza, Aspetti di una città attraverso i secoli [Vicenza, Aspects of a City Through the Centuries] (in Italian). Vicenza.
- Megna, Laura (1988). "Storie patrizie. Note sulla nobiltà vicentina nel Seicento" [History of Vicenza, III/I, The Era of the Venetian Republic]. Storia di Vicenza, III/I, L'Età della Repubblica Veneta [Patrician Stories. Notes on Vicentine Nobility in the 17th Century] (in Italian). Vicenza: Neri Pozza editore.
- Meneghello, Vittorio (1898). Il Quarantotto a Vicenza. Storia documentata [1848 in Vicenza. Documented History] (in Italian). Vicenza.
- Menniti Ippolito, Antonio (1988). "La fedeltà vicentina e Venezia. La dedizione del 1404" [History of Vicenza, III/I, The Era of the Venetian Republic]. Storia di Vicenza, III/I, L'Età della Repubblica Veneta [Vicentine Loyalty and Venice. The Devotion of 1404] (in Italian). Vicenza: Neri Pozza editore.
- Mometto, Giovanni (1989). "Per una storia della popolazione in età moderna" [History of Vicenza, III/1, The Era of the Venetian Republic]. Storia di Vicenza, III/1, L'Età della Repubblica Veneta [For a History of the Population in the Modern Era] (in Italian). Vicenza: Neri Pozza editore.
- Nardello, Mariano (1991). "La società vicentina dall'annessione del Veneto alla prima guerra mondiale" [History of Vicenza, IV/1, The Contemporary Era]. Storia di Vicenza, IV/1, L'Età contemporanea [Vicentine Society from the Annexation of the Veneto to the First World War] (in Italian). Vicenza: Neri Pozza editore.
- Pieropan, Gianni (1991). "1915-18. I. La grande guerra nel Vicentino" [History of Vicenza, IV/1, The Contemporary Era]. Storia di Vicenza, IV/1, L'Età contemporanea [1915–18. I. The Great War in the Vicentine Territory] (in Italian). Vicenza: Neri Pozza editore.
- Preto, Paolo (1989). "La caduta della Repubblica di Venezia e la municipalità democratica" [History of Vicenza, III/2, The Era of the Venetian Republic]. Storia di Vicenza, III/2, L'Età della Repubblica Veneta [The Fall of the Republic of Venice and the Democratic Municipality] (in Italian). Vicenza: Neri Pozza editore.
- Preto, Paolo (2004). "Il Veneto francese e austriaco" [History of the Veneto]. Storia del Veneto [The French and Austrian Veneto] (in Italian). Laterza.
- Reato, Ermenegildo (1991a). "La liquidazione dell'asse ecclesiastico a Vicenza (1866-1968)" [History of Vicenza, IV/1, The Contemporary Era]. Storia di Vicenza, IV/1, L'Età contemporanea [The Liquidation of Ecclesiastical Property in Vicenza (1866–1968)] (in Italian). Vicenza: Neri Pozza editore.
- Reato, Ermenegildo (1991b). "I cattolici vicentini dall'opposizione al governo (1866-67)" [History of Vicenza, IV/1, The Contemporary Era]. Storia di Vicenza, IV/1, L'Età contemporanea [Vicentine Catholics from Opposition to Government (1866–67)] (in Italian). Vicenza: Neri Pozza editore.
- Reato, Ermenegildo (1976). "Il lungo cammino di Vicenza verso l'unità nazionale" [Vicenza Illustrated]. Vicenza illustrata [Vicenza’s Long Journey Toward National Unity] (in Italian). Vicenza: Neri Pozza.
- Serena, Antonio (1990). I giorni di Caino [The Days of Cain] (in Italian). Padova: Manzoni editore.
- Settia, Aldo A. (1988). "Vicenza di fronte ai Longobardi e ai Franchi" [History of Vicenza, Vol. II, The Medieval Era]. Storia di Vicenza, Vol. II, L'Età Medievale [Vicenza Facing the Lombards and Franks] (in Italian). Vicenza: Neri Pozza editore.
- Sottani, Natalino (2012). Antica idrografia vicentina. Storia, evidenze, ipotesi [Ancient Vicentine Hydrography. History, Evidence, Hypotheses] (in Italian). Vicenza: Accademia Olimpica. Bibcode:2012aivs.book.....S.
- Varanini, Gian Maria (1988). "Vicenza nel Trecento: Istituzioni, classe dirigente, economia" [History of Vicenza, II, The Medieval Era]. Storia di Vicenza, II, L'Età Medievale [Vicenza in the 14th Century: Institutions, Ruling Class, Economy] (in Italian). Vicenza: Neri Pozza editore.
- Zamperetti, Sergio (1989). "Poteri locali e governo centrale in una città suddita d'antico regime dal dopo Cambrai ai primo Seicento" [History of Vicenza, III/1, The Era of the Venetian Republic]. Storia di Vicenza, III/1, L'Età della Repubblica Veneta [Local Powers and Central Government in a Subject City of the Old Regime from Post-Cambrai to the Early 17th Century] (in Italian). Vicenza: Neri Pozza editore.
