= Church and Monastery of St. Peter =

Church in Vicenza, Italy

Coordinates: 45°32′57″N 11°33′11″E

- Chiesa e monastero di San Pietro
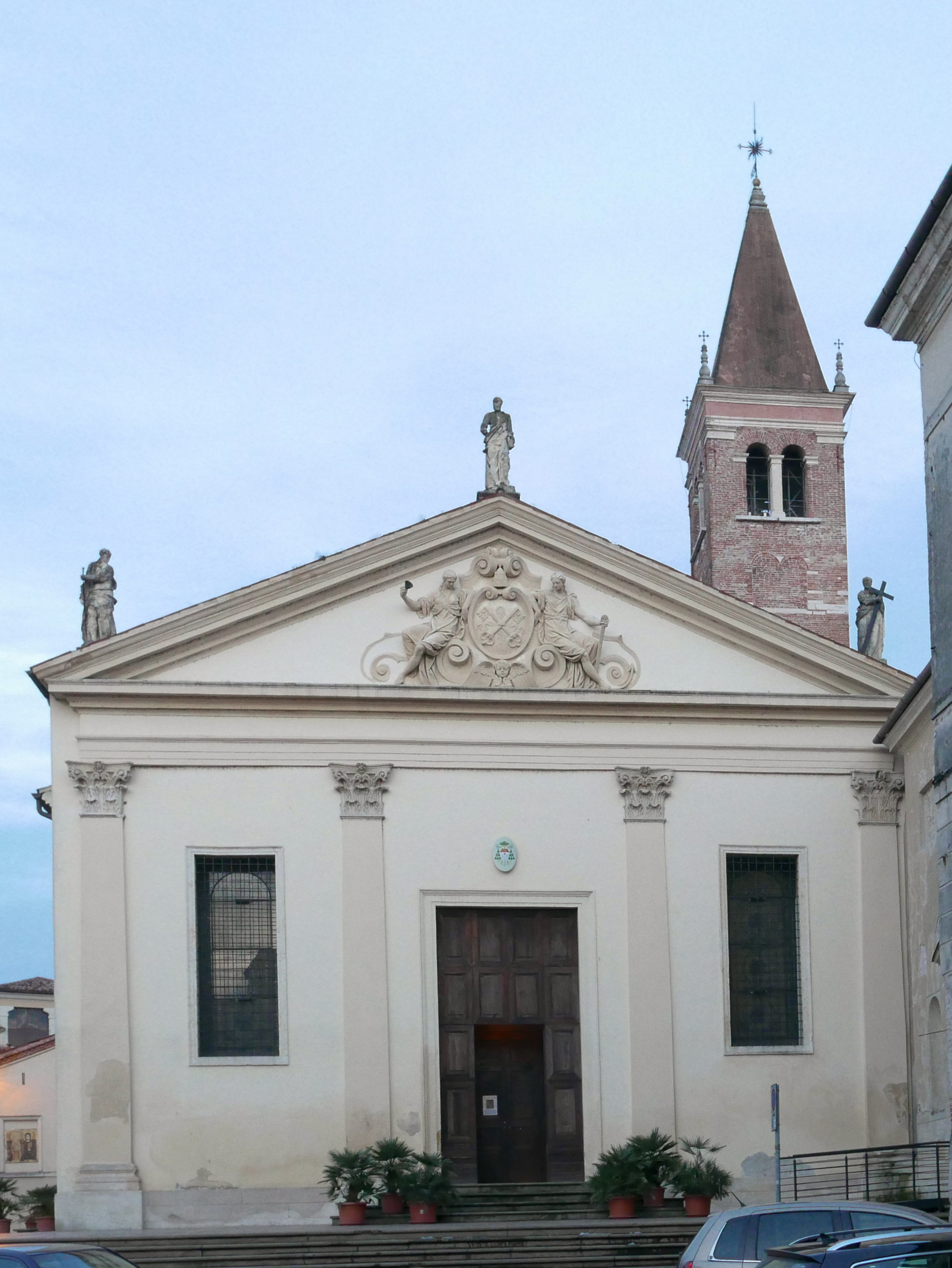
- Facade
- Church and Monastery of St. Peter
- Location: Vicenza, Veneto, Italy
- Denomination: Catholic

Architecture
- Style: Gothic, Renaissance
- Groundbreaking: 9th century
- Completed: 16th century

Administration
- Diocese: Roman Catholic Diocese of Vicenza

The church and monastery of San Pietro, which gave its name to the district of the same name in the city of Vicenza, were the main administrative center of the abbey of San Pietro until 1810. This was the oldest and most important Benedictine convent in the Vicenza area. The church became a parish church, while the former monastery is now a care home for the elderly.

== History ==
=== Origins ===
The foundation of the church of San Pietro is very ancient. Finds have been made there (fragments of a sarcophagus, parts of foundations) dating from the 7th to the 9th century but, although various interpretations have been given over the years, none of them can, due to their characteristics and location, indicate precisely when the church was built.

It has also been hypothesized that the name of the church's patron, St. Peter, could indicate the moment of opposition by the Roman Catholic Church to the occupation of the Arian Lombards, or the period of their conversion to Catholicism, but these are also suppositions.

Accepting the interpretation given by Domenico Bortolan, which is based on an inscription preserved in the church next to the altar of Our Lady of Sorrows, the Vicenza historian Giovanni Mantese states that the monastery could have been founded in the year 827, which doesn't exclude the possibility that the church already existed.

Taking into account what is known about rural churches from the first millennium - such as those of San Michele in Caldogno, Santa Maria in Favrega and San Zeno in Costabissara, San Martino near Ponte del Marchese and San Giorgio in Gogna in Vicenza - it can be assumed that the early church was a small, extremely simple rectangular building with no significant architectural elements, and a single apse.

=== Middle Ages ===
This first monastery, probably Benedictine and for men only, had a difficult existence; almost certainly - like the other one of Saints Felix and Fortunatus - it suffered the raids of the Hungarians at the end of the 9th and beginning of the 10th centuries, and was perhaps destroyed. In any case it was on the point of ruin when, in 977, the privilege of bishop Rodolfo defined it as "almost annihilated and devoid of any monastic cult and divine office". A privilege granted by bishop Astolfo in 1033 and a diploma of protection from emperor Henry the Lion in 1055 proved to be of little use.

There are different opinions about when it became a convent. According to Mantese it was already a convent in the first half of the 11th century, according to others it became one a few decades later.

As was the case for the Benedictines of San Felice, the bishops also assigned a considerable amount of land to the monastery of San Pietro as a fiefdom, extending throughout the Vicenza area. Among others, the vast Selva Mugla, in the area now comprised between the towns of Vivaro, Polegge and Cavazzale; most of the territory east of the city, from Settecà to Casale, from Lerino to Grantorto and Rampazzo and up to Grumolo, later called "delle Abbadesse".

Probably during the 11th century - but the period is not certain, given the scarcity of artifacts that have survived until today, mainly the perimeter walls and those of the facade - a second, larger church was built in place of the previous one. Considering the period of construction, it must have been a Romanesque-style building, with a taller central nave with windows that let in a lot of light, two lower side naves and a three-gabled façade.

Other churches also came under the monastery's authority, such as those of San Vitale and Sant'Andrea, also within the village of San Pietro, and the small church of San Pietro in Monte at the top of the route where, later, the Scalette of Monte Berico were built. This small church was ceded to the Order of the Blessed Virgin Mary in 1280.

However, after the year 1000, the immense patrimony was endangered by rural lords and small feudal lords who attempted to usurp the funds that the abbot of San Felice and the abbess of San Pietro had granted them. Since by this time even the bishop of Vicenza had lost almost all his power, the latter turned to the Germanic emperor; thus in 1048 Henry III signed a privilege in favor of the monastery of San Pietro - whose abbess had won the favor of the empress to obtain this privilege - and this act was later very useful for the defense of the monastery's patrimony.

With the Concordat of Worms, the long struggle for investitures ended, and the protection of the monastery of San Pietro passed under the auspices of the Pope; with a privilege of 1123, Callixtus II placed it under apostolic protection. The bishop of Vicenza, Lotario, promoted the restoration of the buildings and in 1136 confirmed all the privileges granted by his predecessors to the Benedictine nuns of San Pietro.

In the 13th century the Benedictine order began to decline, despite the attempts made by popes and bishops from Vicenza to restore the monasteries to their original fervor, attempts that however were not very successful. In 1254 Pope Innocent IV instructed the then bishop of Vicenza Manfredo dei Pii and Bartholomew of Breganze to visit the monastery of San Pietro, which had fallen into disciplinary decay and was plagued by heresy, to carry out a reform. This reform was not successful, so much so that in 1291 Pope Nicholas IV had to ask Bishop Pietro Saraceni to go personally to the monastery and reform it, and if this was not possible, to transfer the nuns elsewhere.

Later on the patrimony grew and diversified: in the 14th century the nuns also owned wool processing workshops and others for iron processing along the Bacchiglione river, a leather processing workshop in Piazza Biade in Vicenza and a furnace in Camisano.

However, the monastery remained active, retaining its numerous possessions, and in 1318 and 1335 respectively it received confirmation of the ancient privileges granted by its predecessors from Bishop Sperandio and the Franciscan Bishop Biagio da Leonessa; In reality these privileges were more formal than real, as the monastery's patrimony had been largely depleted and the abbesses were constantly involved in legal disputes. Fiore de' Porcastri, who came from a noble family in Vicenza, was the greatest abbess of San Pietro in the 14th century. Under the rule of the Della Scala family, the church's assets were further plundered, but the monastery of San Pietro managed to have its direct patronage by the Holy See renewed, first in 1375 by Pope Gregory XI and shortly after by Pope Urban VI; at the end of the century, however, only 5 nuns lived in the monastery, two of whom were foreigners.

=== The modern era ===
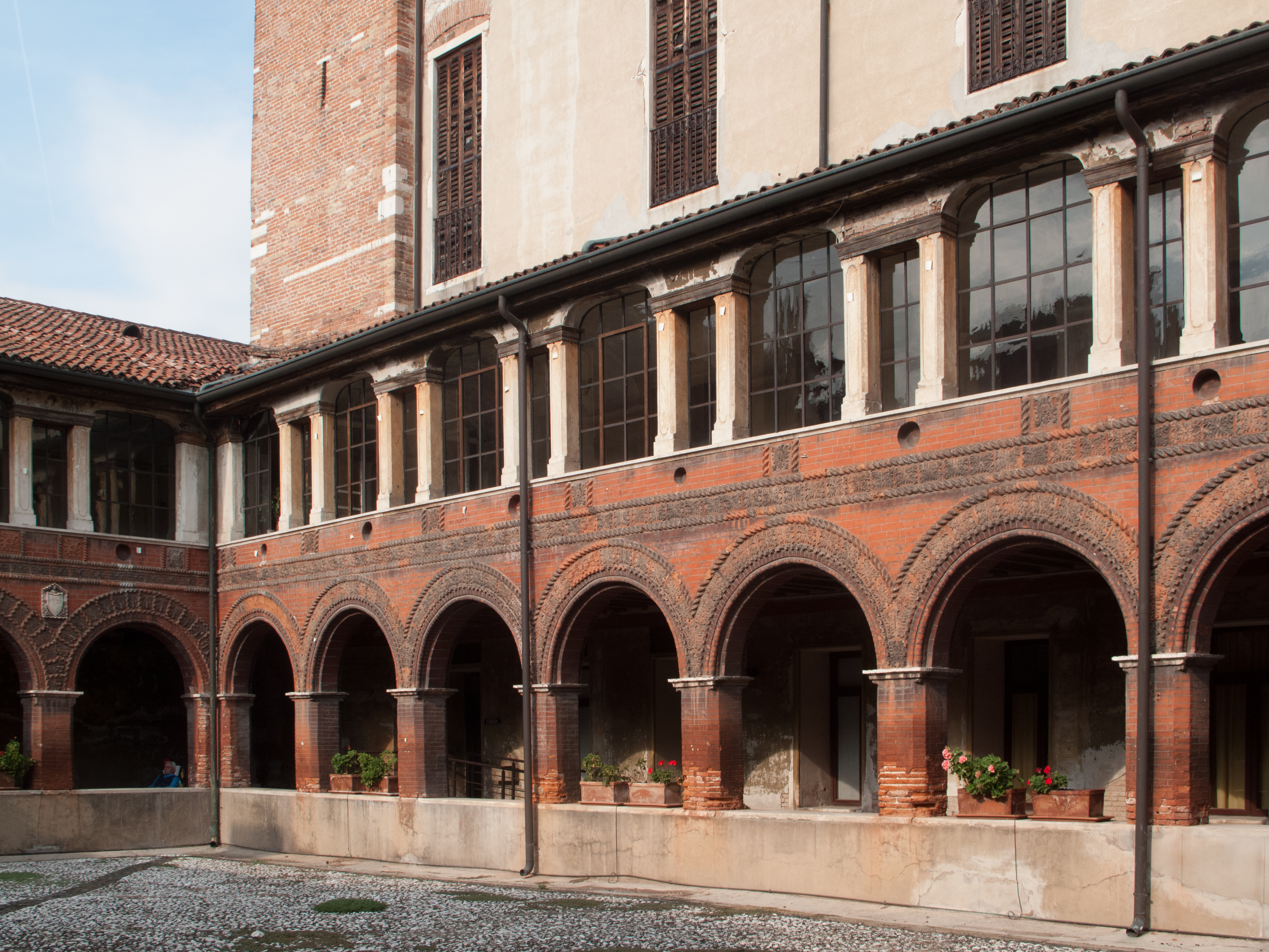
15th century cloister

During the 15th century all the monastery's architecture was renovated: in 1427 reconstruction and embellishment work was carried out on the cloister, with the characteristic terracotta decorations and in the second half of the century the church was completely restructured - and reconsecrated in 1596; the ground level was raised, probably to better defend the building from flooding by the nearby Bacchiglione river, the central nave was lowered and the façade took on its current gabled shape, the interior was renovated where marble columns, adorned with elaborate capitals, were placed to support the mighty arches.

All the buildings were then renovated according to the late Gothic and neo-Renaissance styles of the time, thanks to the considerable funds that the nuns, almost all of whom then belonged to the city's aristocratic families, contributed to the monastery; during this period the previous works and existing tombstones were lost; today, only a few traces of these works remain.

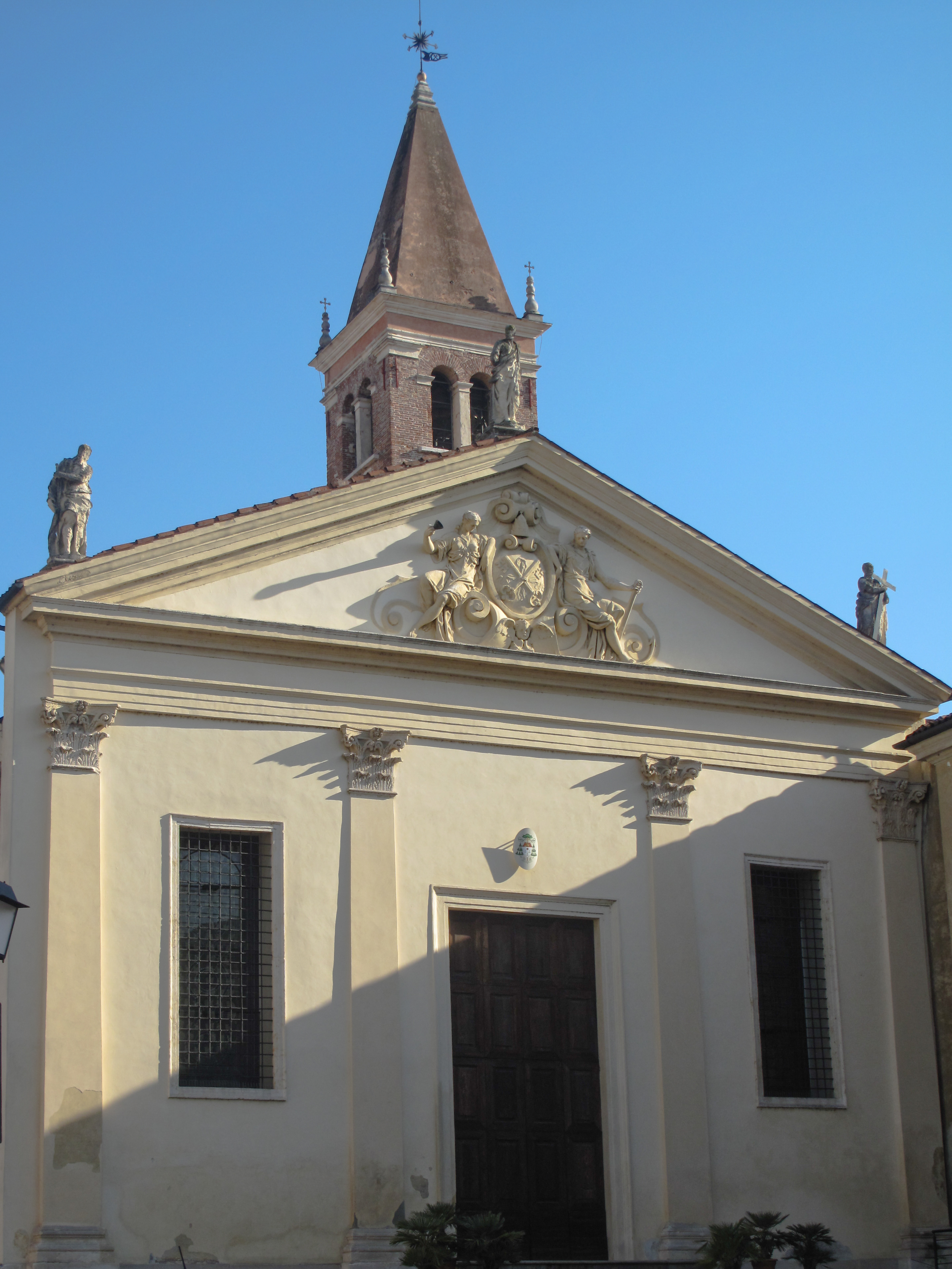
Sixteenth-century reconstruction of the facade

The fifteenth century, however, had begun with a very degraded level of monastic life, also due to the mismanagement of the abbesses of the time, almost all of whom belonged to the city's aristocracy, who entered the convent not by vocation but by force, and were therefore led to exercise the prestige and power that came from their condition. Thus, in 1435, the Bishop of Vicenza, Francesco Malipiero, undertook a reform of the religious orders of the diocese, and in particular of the Benedictines, to which the nuns of San Pietro belonged; he deprived the abbess of her administrative powers, entrusting them to nuns elected every year, and then recognized the right of the chapter to elect the abbess every year. He also forbade any person of either sex, secular or religious, to enter the cloistered areas and ordered an iron grille to be placed in the visiting rooms; however, these provisions were not respected, and ten years later Pope Eugene IV, who confirmed the bishop's provisions with a papal edict, disapproved of the bad behavior of the nuns, which was the cause of the people's complaints. After this measure, the convent recovered considerably and the number of nuns increased; at the beginning of the following century there were almost fifty, and in 1524 there were 80, leading an exemplary religious life. This reform was similar to that of the male convent of San Felice and, as in that case, in 1499 San Pietro was incorporated into the Congregation of Santa Giustina of Padua.

In 1520 Pope Leo X issued a bull against the illegitimate possessors and usurpers of the property of the nuns of San Pietro. Not only had the vast tracts of land in the suburb, Schio and other areas been tampered with, but even the ancient rights and privileges that the nuns had over the waters of the Bacchiglione were being challenged.

In 1560 the nuns of San Pietro had the Camarzo gate closed, an opening in the Scaliger walls that was located south of the monastery near the Bacchiglione.

At the end of the 16th century - between 1571 and 1596 - the church underwent further embellishment, this time in classical style. Once the small portico and the three rose windows had disappeared, the facade took on its present appearance. Inside, the walls of the apse were adorned with an elaborate Corinthian facing, a refined work from the Albanese workshop; the nave was covered with a wooden coffered ceiling, containing paintings from the Maganza workshop, which was destroyed during the Austrian bombardment of the city on June 10, 1848.

The Angelica Map, which provides a lot of information about the city at the end of the 16th century, shows a rectangular church, with statues at the top of the tympanum and a small portico and three rose windows on the façade to mark the three internal naves. The bell tower and the cloister of the convent are clearly visible.

=== Contemporary age ===
Following the suppression of all religious orders under the Napoleonic decrees of 1806 and 1810, the nuns were forced to abandon the monastery, which became state property. The church, as part of the ecclesiastical reorganization, became a parish church.

In September 1810, Ottavio Trento, a nobleman from Vicenza descended from an ancient aristocratic family, donated a large sum of money to the local council to set up a "House of voluntary and semi-forced labor" to provide a solution to the serious hardship suffered by the many workers and artisans in Vicenza who, with their families, had been left penniless during those years of economic crisis. To carry out the project, the Municipality selected the complex of the former monastery of San Pietro and entrusted the architect and engineer Bartolomeo Malacarne with the task of renovating the rooms; the work effectively began only in November 1813 - when the Austrians returned to Vicenza - and was completed in 1814.

The Istituto Trento, named in honor of its generous founder who had died in 1812, initially took in elderly guests and those in need of assistance, especially during the winter months; five years later it also began to take in the children of unemployed workers, creating a separate section for professional education to train the boys in a craft; in 1881 this section was moved to the new orphanage for boys set up in the nearby former convent of San Domenico. Thus the Ottavio Trento Institute specialized more and more in the care of poor elderly people, equipping itself with structures and personnel adequate to the needs of the times. It is managed by the Public Institutions of Assistance and Charity (IPAB).

== Description ==
=== The church ===
==== Exterior and facade ====
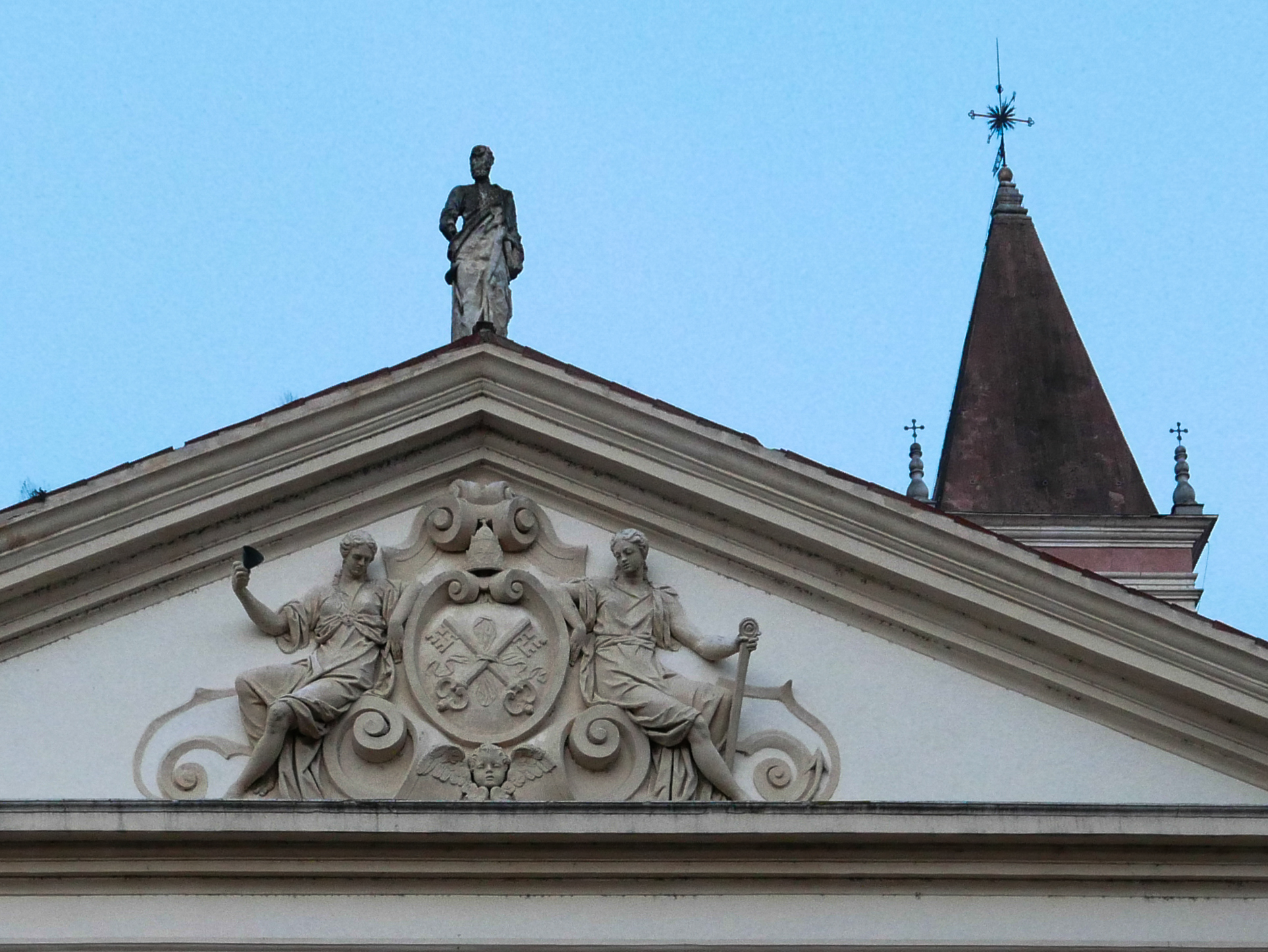
Gable with bas-relief and coat of arms

The church is preceded by a large parvise which is accessed via a stairway with ramps on two sides; from the parvise four steps lead to the simple portal, rebuilt in the early 19th century by Bartolomeo Malacarne, at the time of the renovation of the monastery.

Raised above the level of the square in the 15th century, later than its foundation, the church is in late Gothic style but has a classical façade, built in 1597 by Camillo Mariani, the Albanese family or Domenico Groppino.

Four Corinthian lesenes divide the smooth, simple façade, where the space between the columns is interrupted by two vertical windows; the size of the windows, the door and the columns create the harmonious balance of the façade.

Above, the façade is surmounted by a tympanum, where a bas-relief with the papal coat of arms of the keys of St. Peter stands out, flanked by two allegorical figures representing the theological virtues of Hope and Faith. The tympanum is crowned by three statues: St. Peter on top with St. Paul (on the left) and St. Andrew (on the right) on either side. All the sculptures can be attributed to the Vicenza period of Camillo Mariani.

To the right of the entrance an ancient Gothic tombstone commemorates the burial place of Elica, founder of the original monastery.

==== Interior ====
The interior has a rectangular plan, with three truncated naves separated by two rows of four limestone columns with capitals decorated with angular volutes and acanthus leaves, supporting very wide semicircular arches.

The recently restored 19th-century painting above the central nave, St. Peter in Glory Among Angels, is the work of Lorenzo Giacomelli. The four altars in the naves are the work of the Albanese workshop, as is the main altar in the apse. While the Albanese family left important architectural and sculptural works, the Maganza family filled St. Peter's with their paintings and had the family tomb in the church, as commemorated by a plaque in the left aisle.

Counter-façade

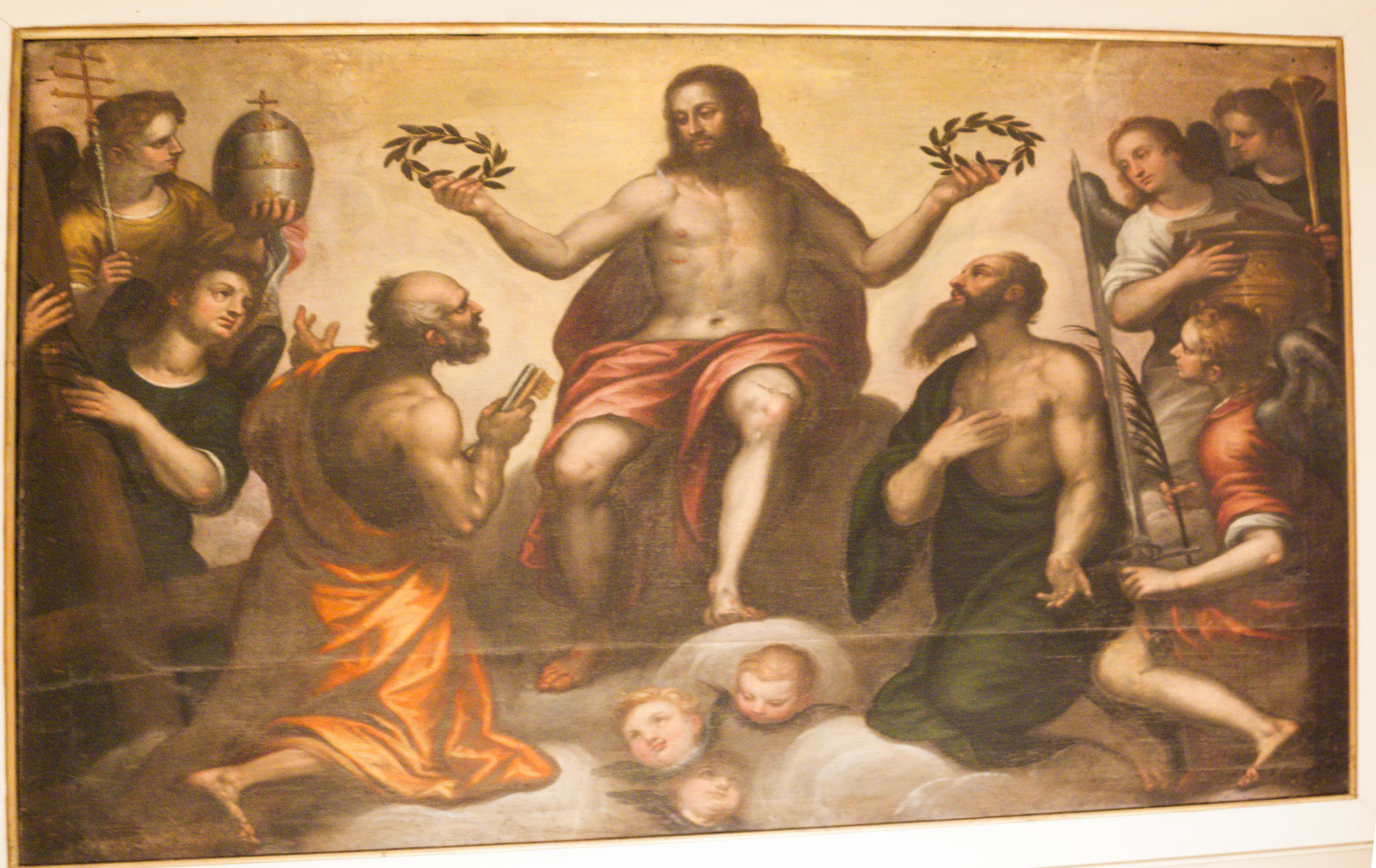
Counter-façade - Christ between Saints Peter and Paul

Located high up on the counter-façade – once it was in the central space between the columns of the apse – the large painting attributed to Alessandro Maganza depicts Christ giving crowns to Saints Peter and Paul, kneeling in ecstatic devotion.

Right aisle

The first altar on the right was commissioned by the Confraternity of the Holy Sacrament in 1600, and is the work of Francesco Albanese: above the polychrome marble altarpiece, with two sculpted putti at the sides, the altarpiece depicts the Lamentation of Christ by Alessandro Maganza, also from 1600. A work faithful to the canons of the Counter-Reformation, in the Deposition scene there is only one light that strikes the white body of Christ, which stands out against the dark rocky background and stormy sky. The same dark tones are found in the figures gathered around the deposed Christ, among which the sorrowful face of the mother stands out.

Following on the wall is the altarpiece depicting the Martyrdom of St. Andrew, also attributed to Alessandro Maganza, which comes from the church of St. Andrew, belonging to the monastery and demolished in 1801.

Leaning against the wall is the altar of the Sacred Heart, an unattributed work from 1634, which replaced an earlier one from 1564 by Giovanni Battista Magrè, dedicated to the Nativity of Christ. On either side of the altar are statues of Saints Andrew and James, sculptures by Girolamo Pittoni from the early 16th century.

Again on the right wall is the altarpiece with St. Benedict Receiving the Twelve-Year-Old St. Maurus from His Father, Equitius, which can be attributed to Giambattista or even to Alessandro Maganza, dated around 1596.

In the apse at the end of the nave, after the door that leads to the bell tower, there is a wrought iron grate, framed by a lavish marble architectural element, made towards the end of the 17th century in the workshop of Orazio Marinali. The grate allowed communication with the monastery and allowed the nuns to attend services. At the back of the apse is the altar known as the altar of San Mauro, because it housed the Maganza painting, now on the wall. Since 1968 it has housed the tabernacle and is embellished by a throne from 1752.

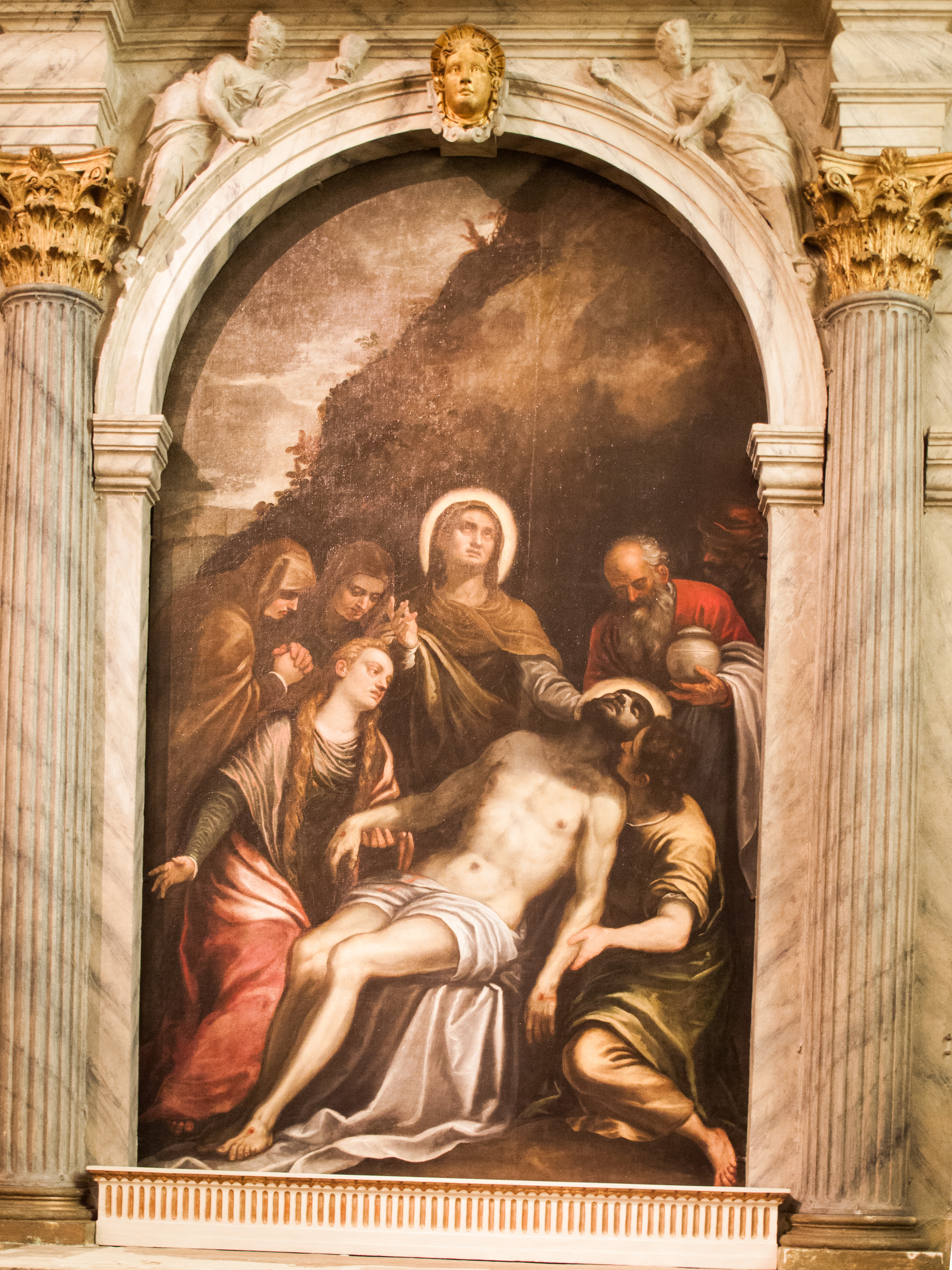
Altarpiece of the Deposition

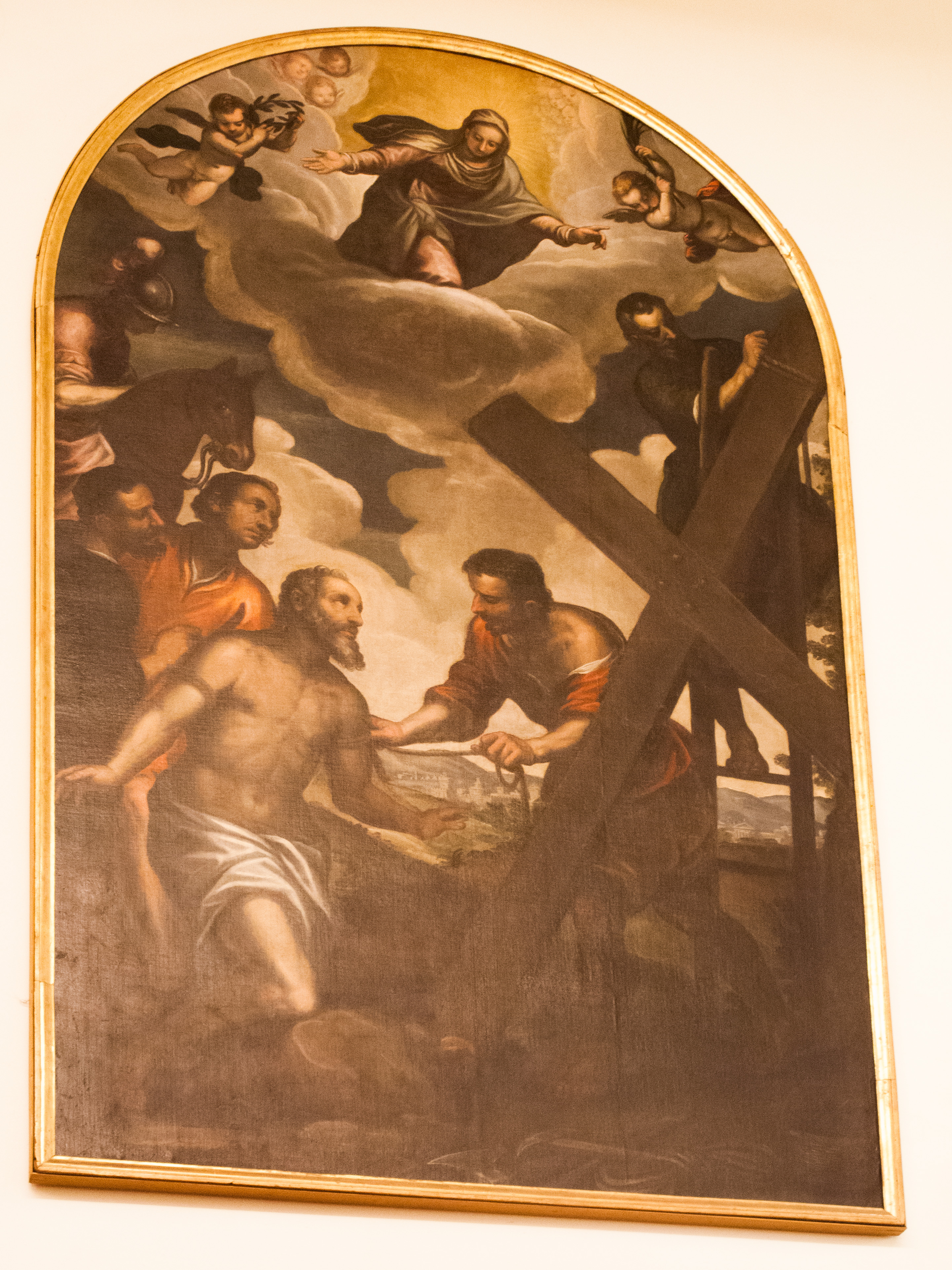
Altarpiece of the Martyrdom of St. Andrew

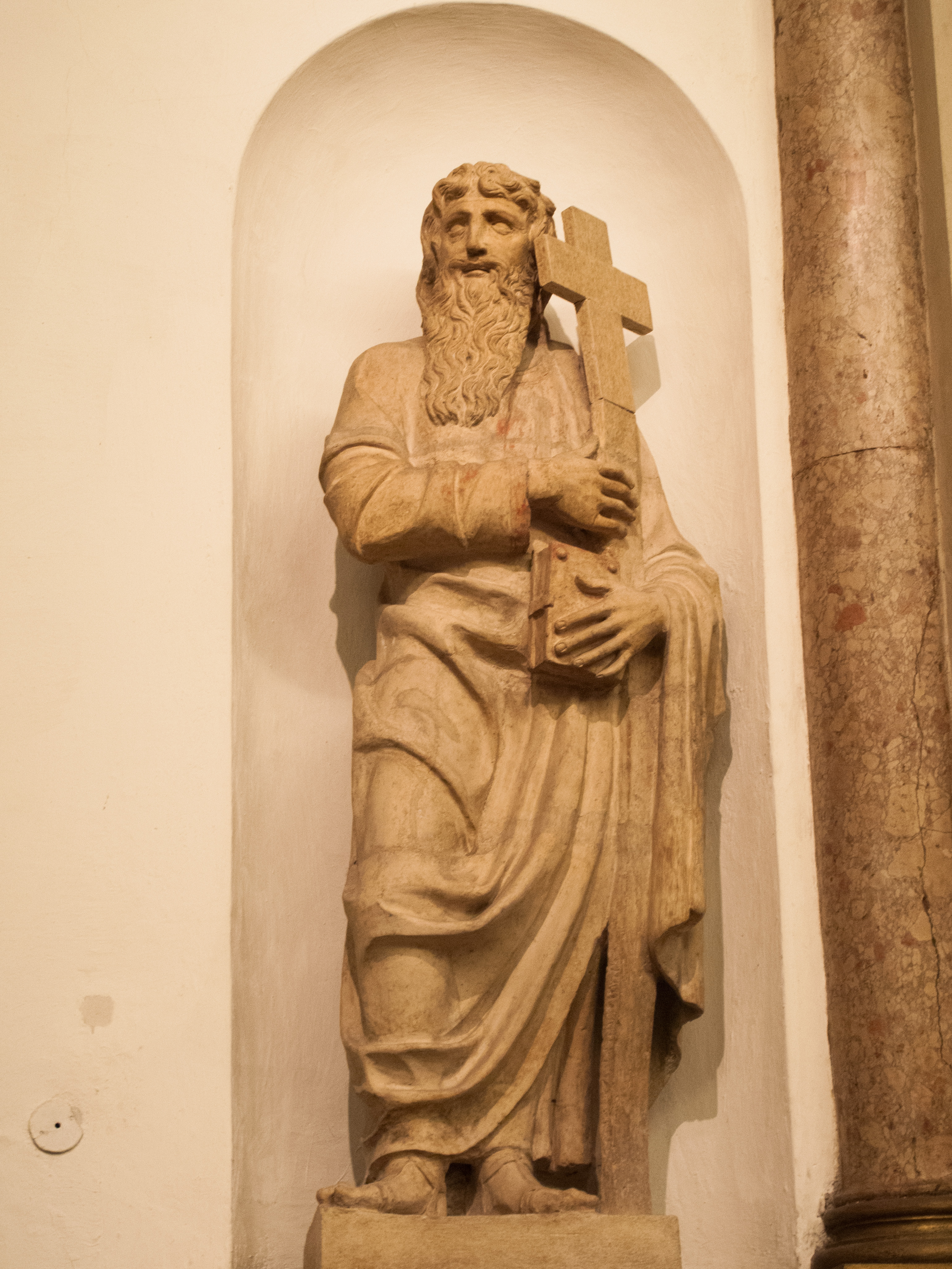
Statue of St. Andrew

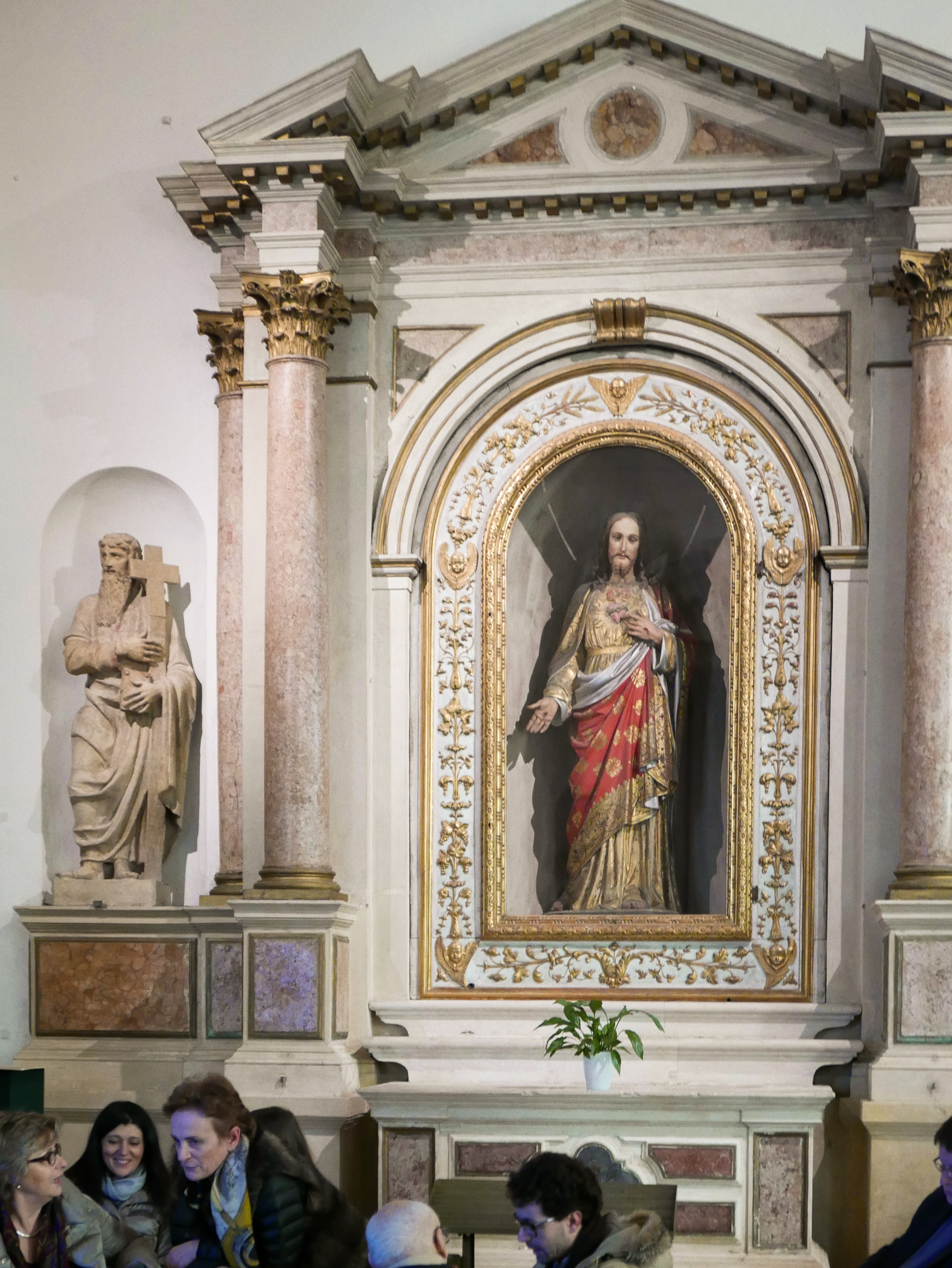
Altar of the Sacred Heart

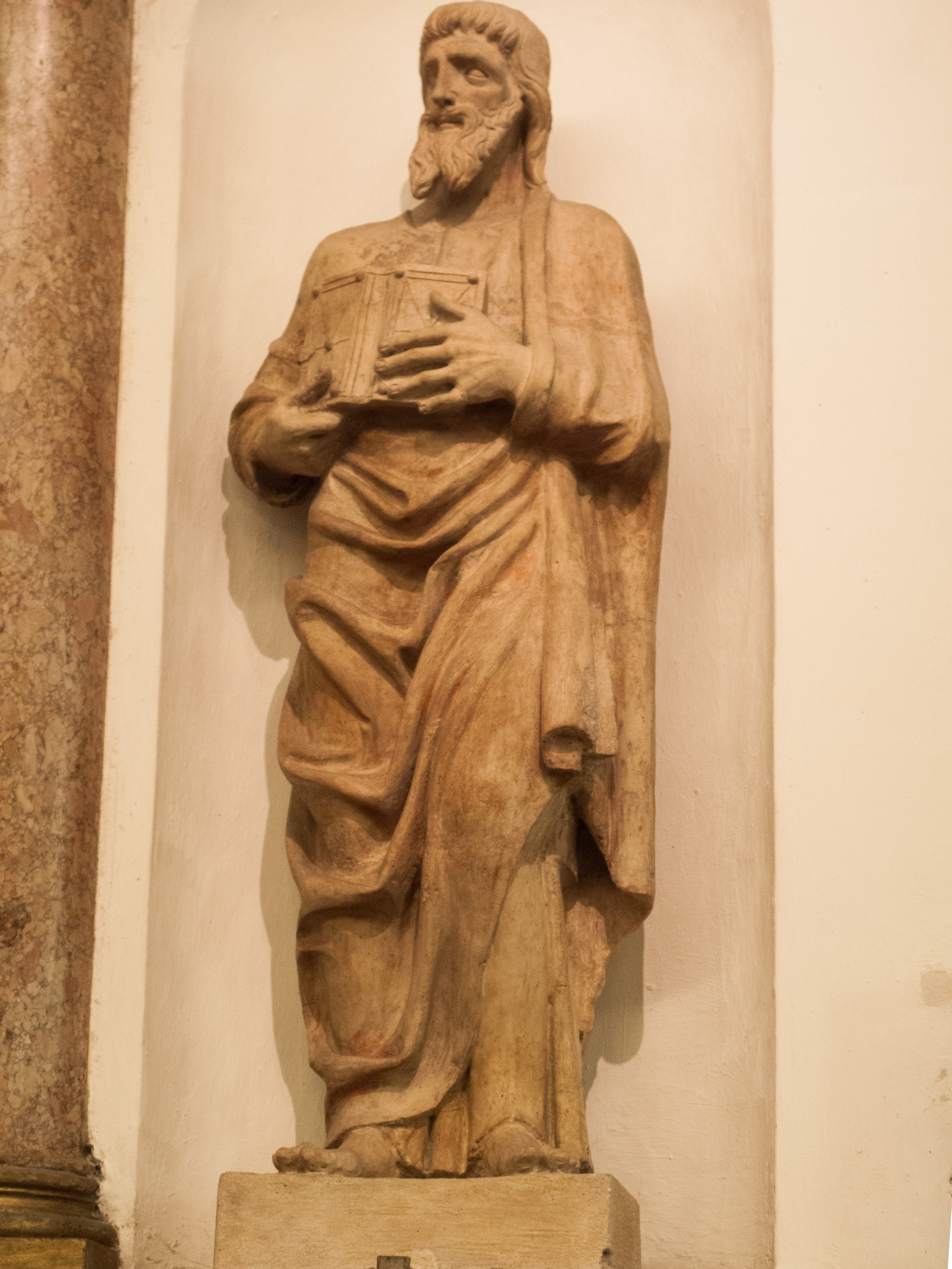
Statue of St. James

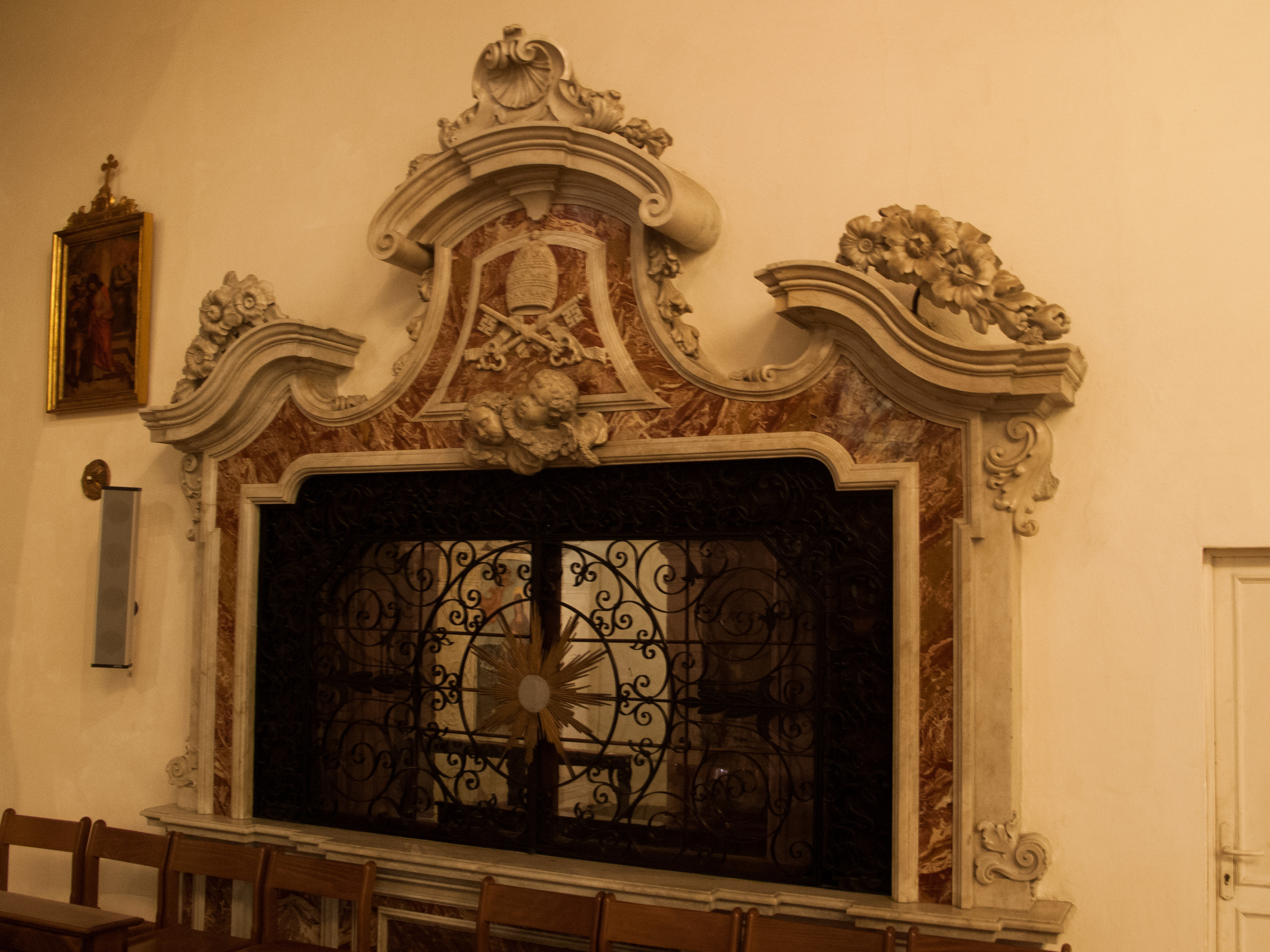
Grate

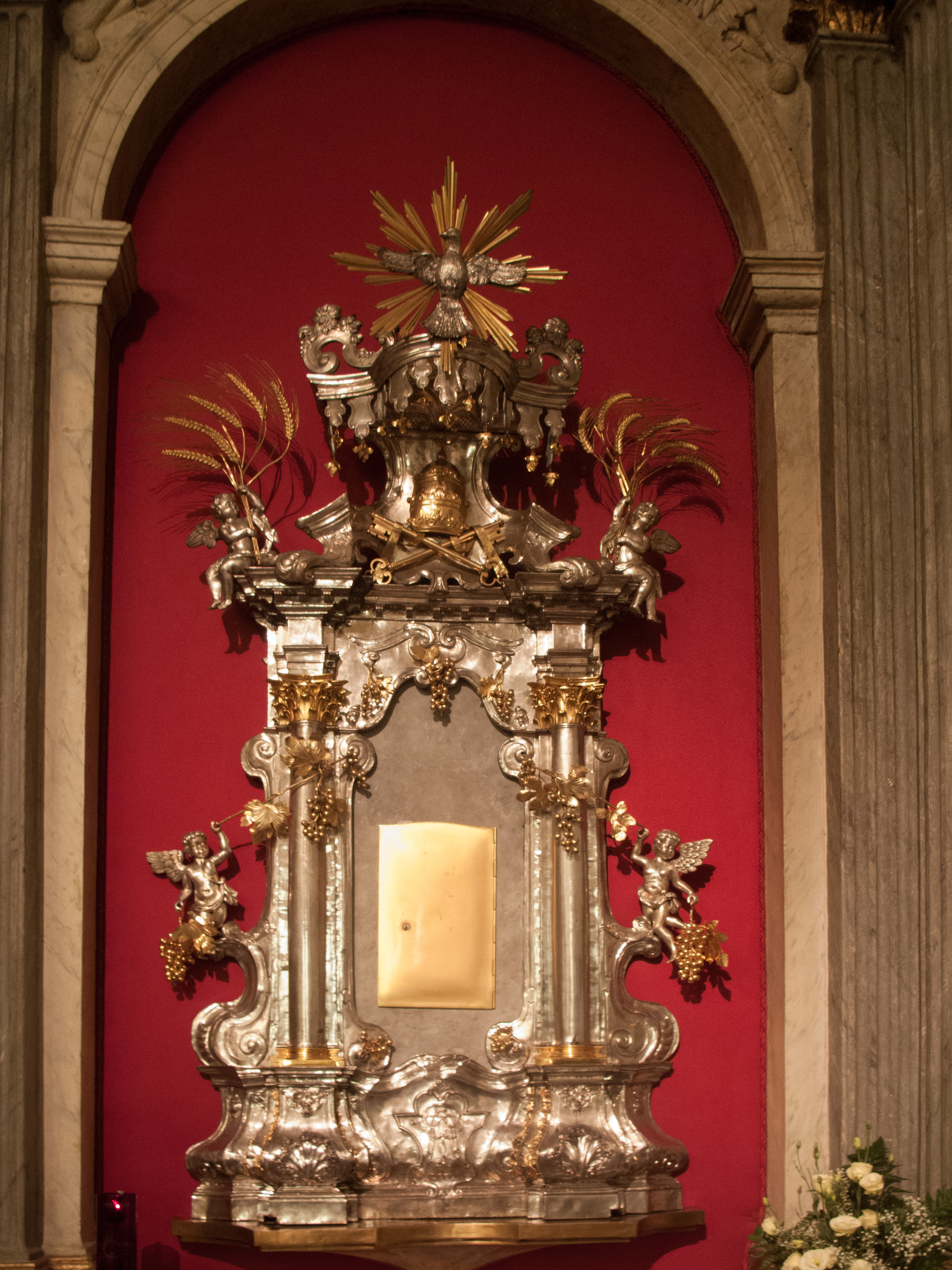
Tabernacle, on the altar of St. Maurus

Presbytery

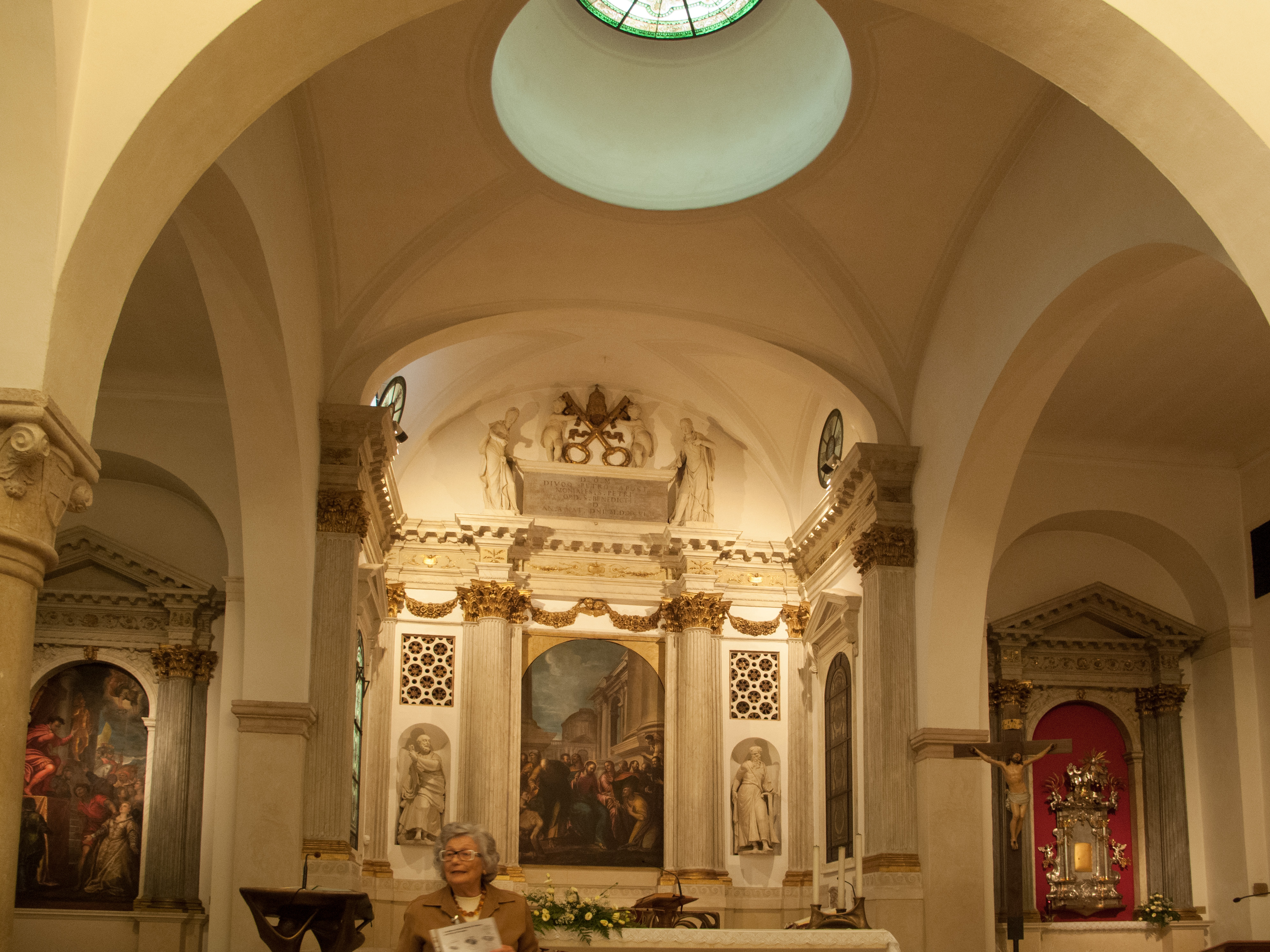
Presbytery and main altar

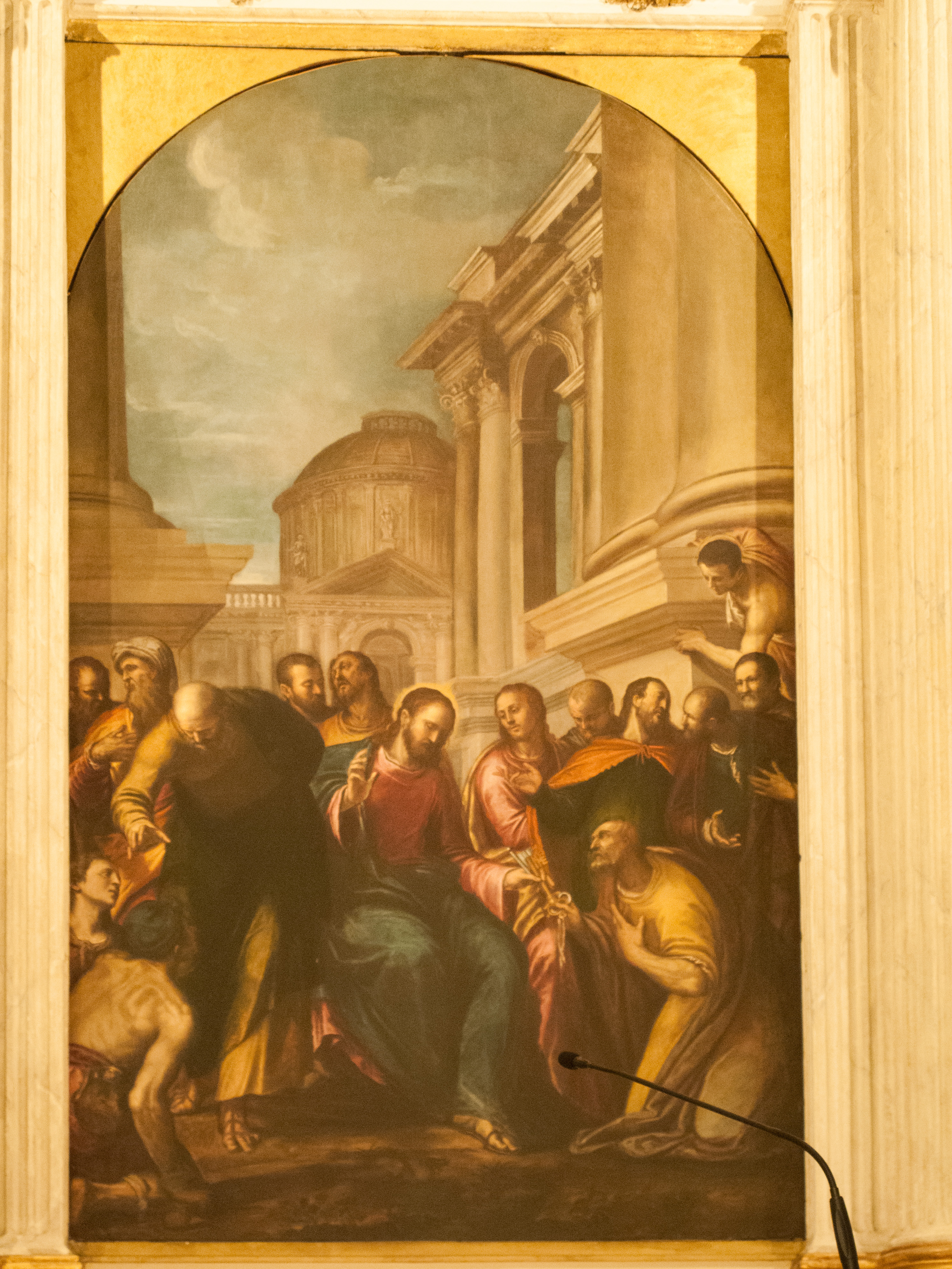
Altarpiece of the main altar - The delivery of the keys (Giovanni Battista Zelotti)

A round arch with a very wide span separates the main nave from the vast quadrilateral presbytery, raised one step and in front of the apse.

The entire high altar, the base, the columns, the entablature, the frieze and the statues of Saints Peter and Paul are the work of Giambattista Albanese in 1596. The altarpiece depicting Christ giving the keys to St. Peter, a 1575 work by Giovanni Battista Zelotti, has been placed on the altar for some decades now, where the Maganza canvas used to be (now on the counter-façade), having been moved from the altar of the Madonna and Child in the left aisle. The architectural background is of particular interest, with its evident Palladian influence: one can recognize a corner of the Palazzo Chiericati and the dome of the Cathedral.

Left aisle

In the truncated apse of the left aisle is the altarpiece with the Martyrdom of Saint Justina, by Giambattista Maganza the Younger, probably with the collaboration of his father Alessandro, above the altar of the same name, by the Albanese family.

Along the wall is the altar of the Madonna and Child, with statues of Saints Benedict and Scholastica on either side, sculptures by Tommaso and Matteo Allio, dated 1664-65.

Proceeding westwards and passing the side entrance, there is the funeral monument dedicated to Bernardino Trebazio, a learned humanist priest who died in 1548, attributed to the sculptors Giovanni and Girolamo from the workshop of Pedemuro San Biagio.

Finally, above the altar of the Virgin, a work by Francesco Albanese the Elder from 1588, commissioned by Abbess Silvia Poiana, is the altarpiece with the Adoration of the Shepherds, a painting by Francesco Maffei, perhaps the most important work in the church. The sky and the earth are crowded with figures, cherubs and other angels flying towards the Nativity scene, around which the shepherds and an angel with outstretched wings are gathered.

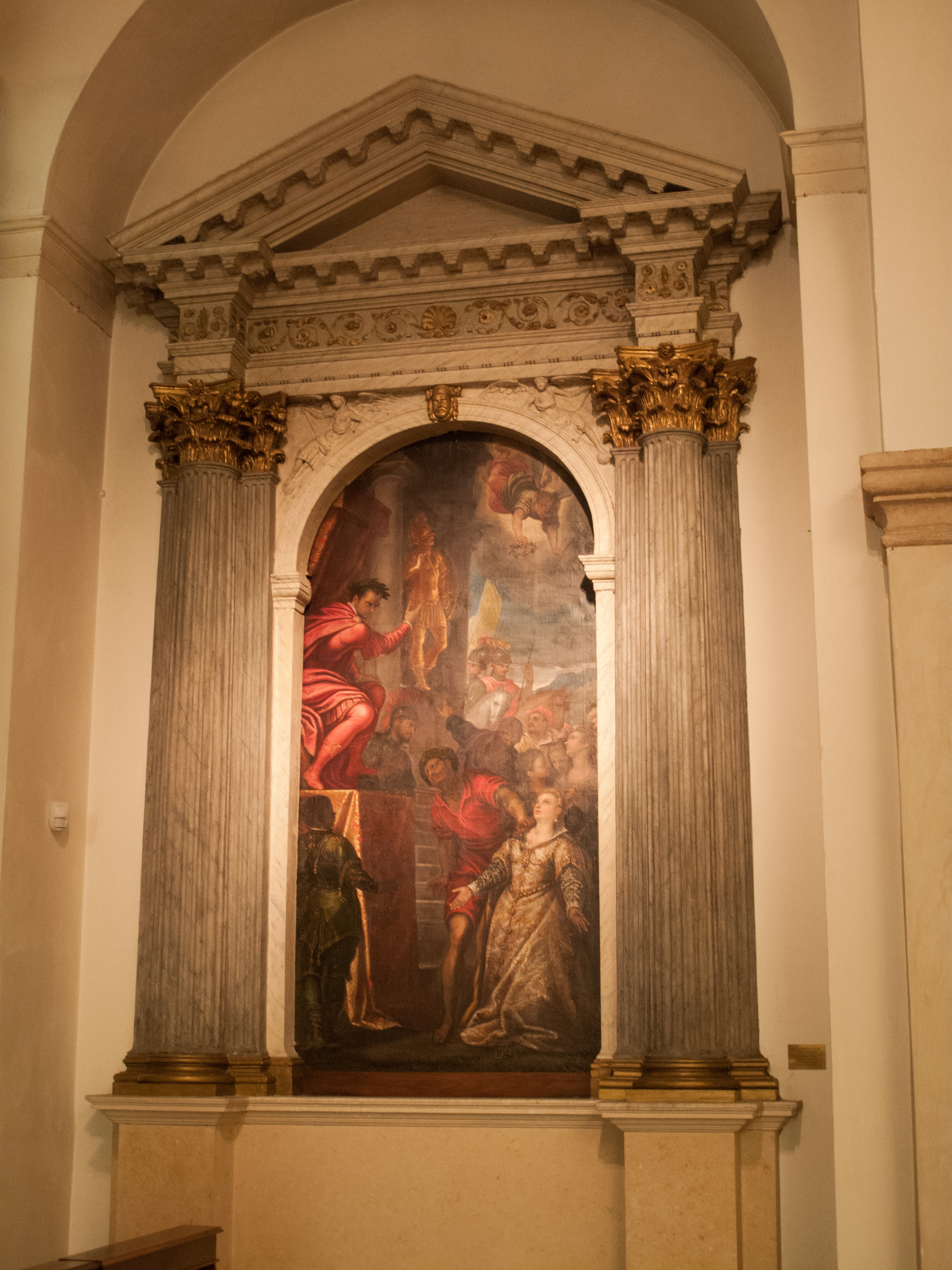
Altarpiece of the Martyrdom of Saint Justina

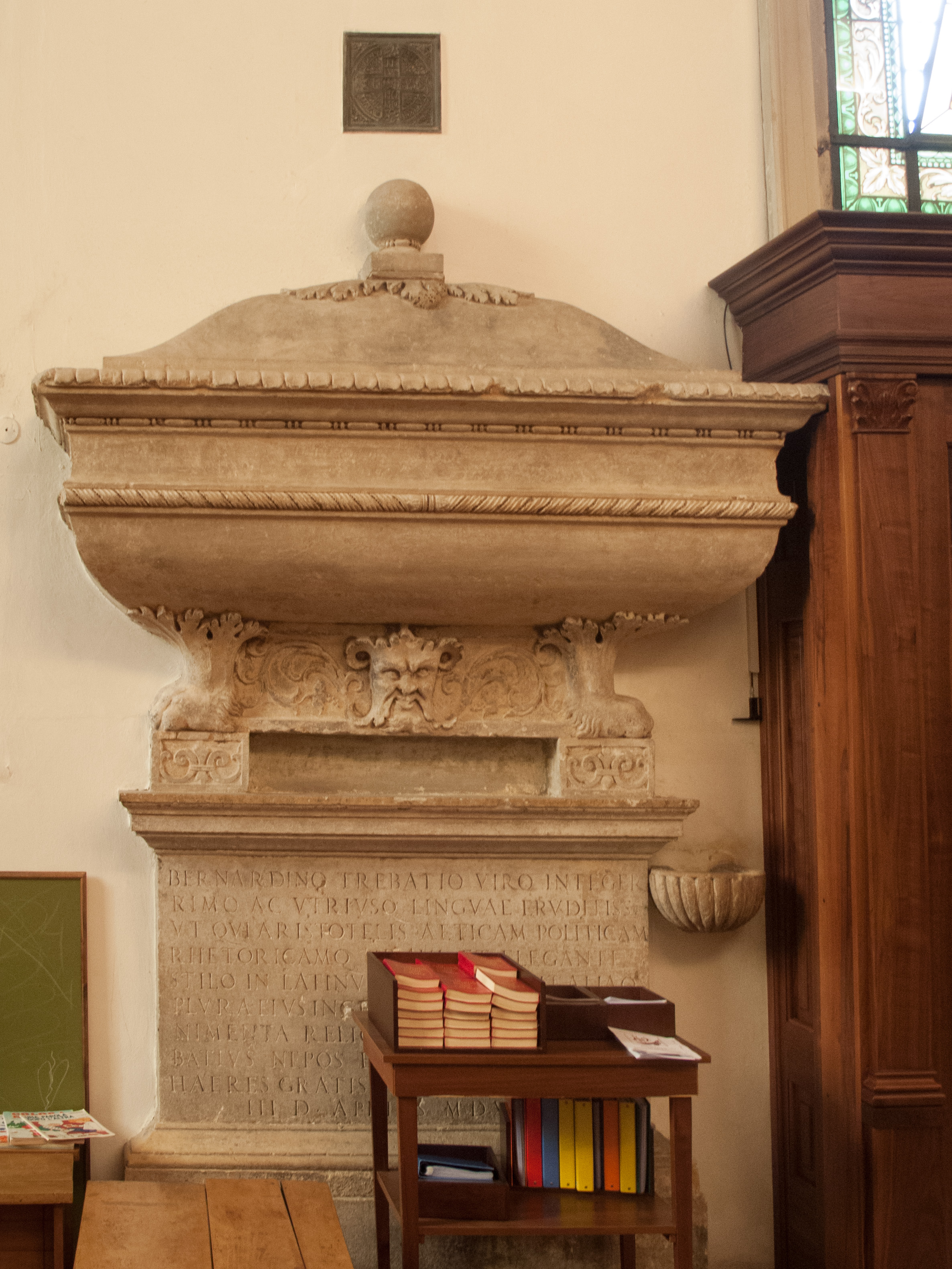
Monument to Trebazio

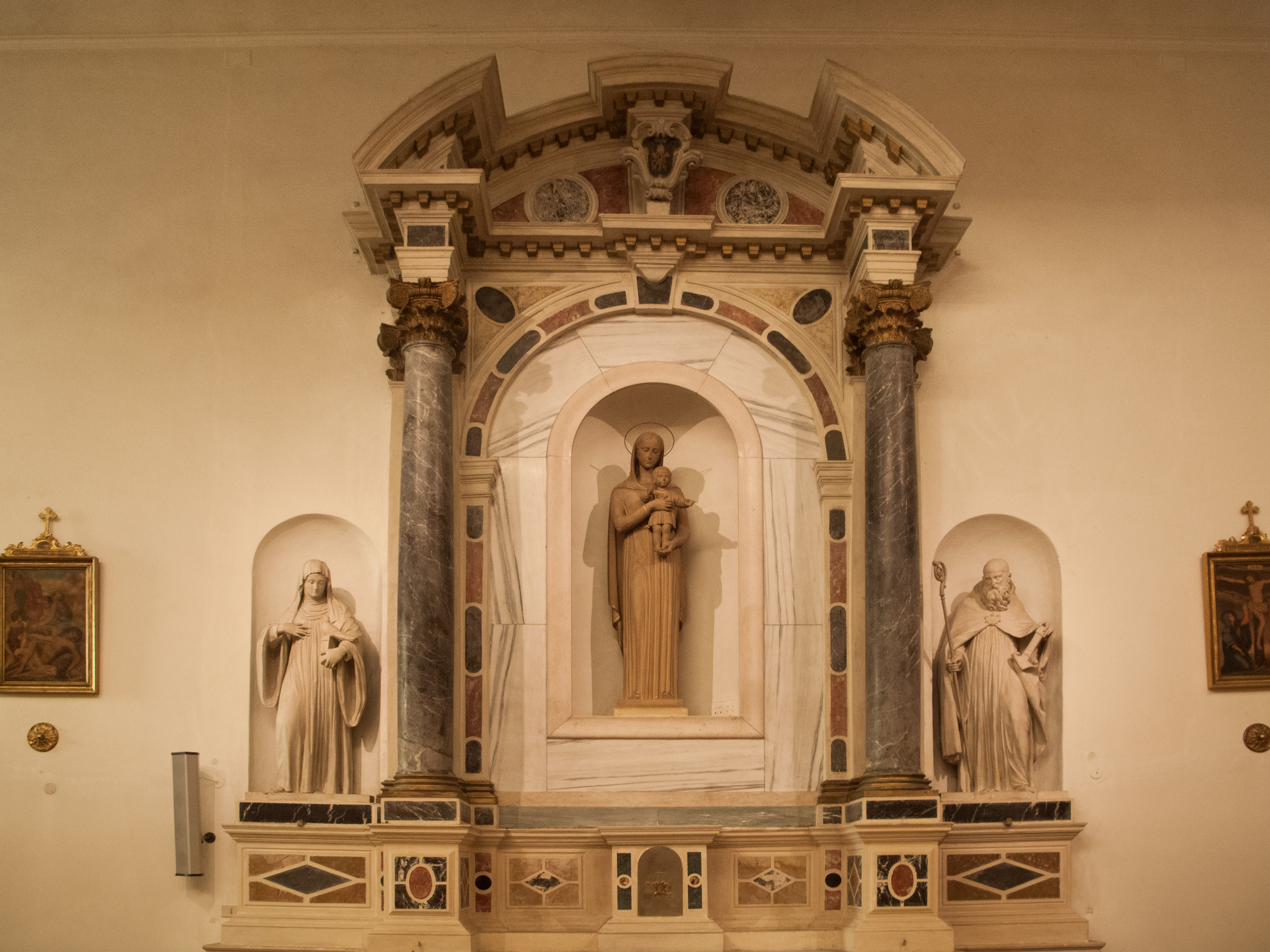
Altar of the Madonna

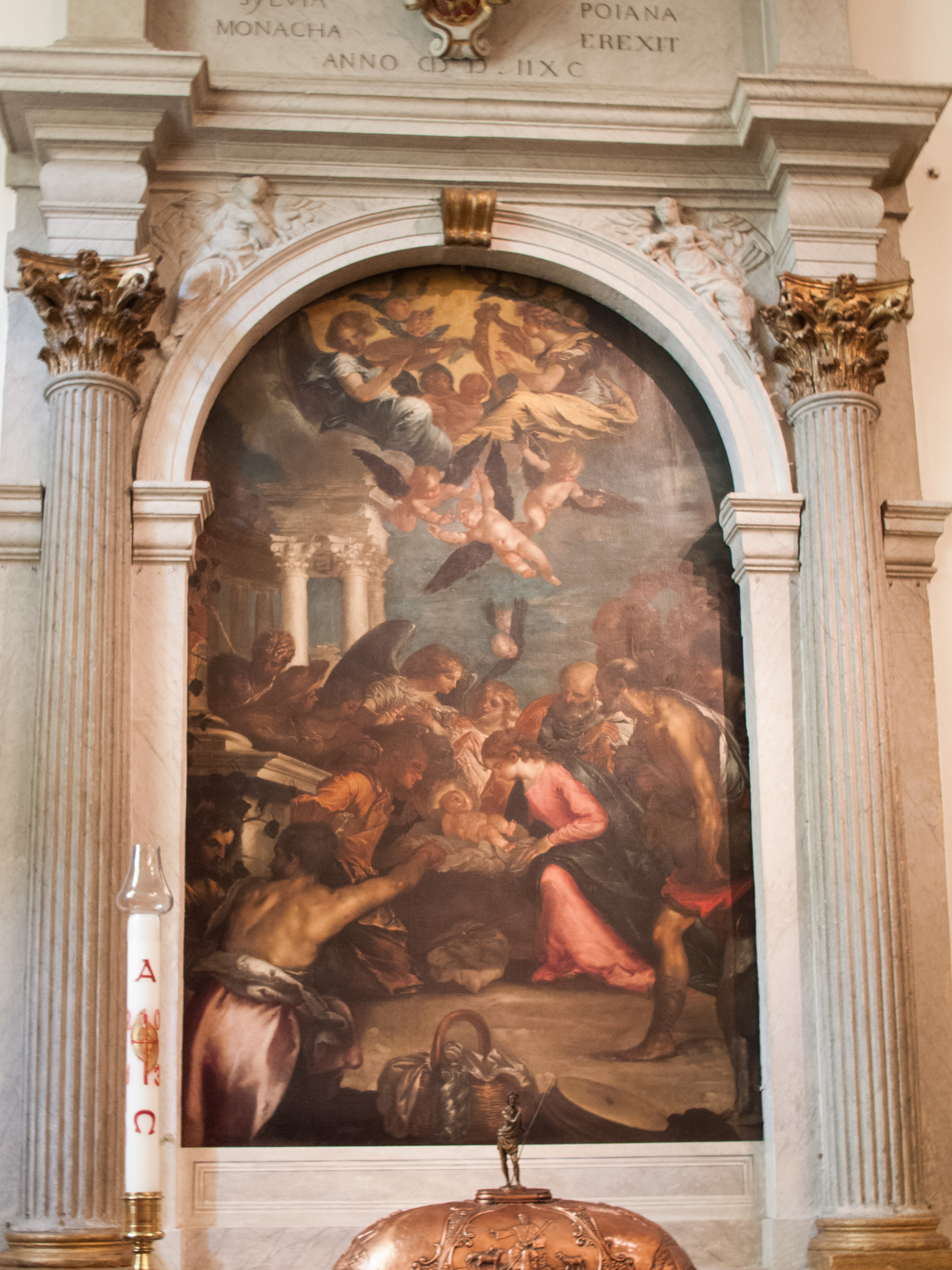
Altarpiece of the Adoration of the Shepherds

=== The bell tower ===
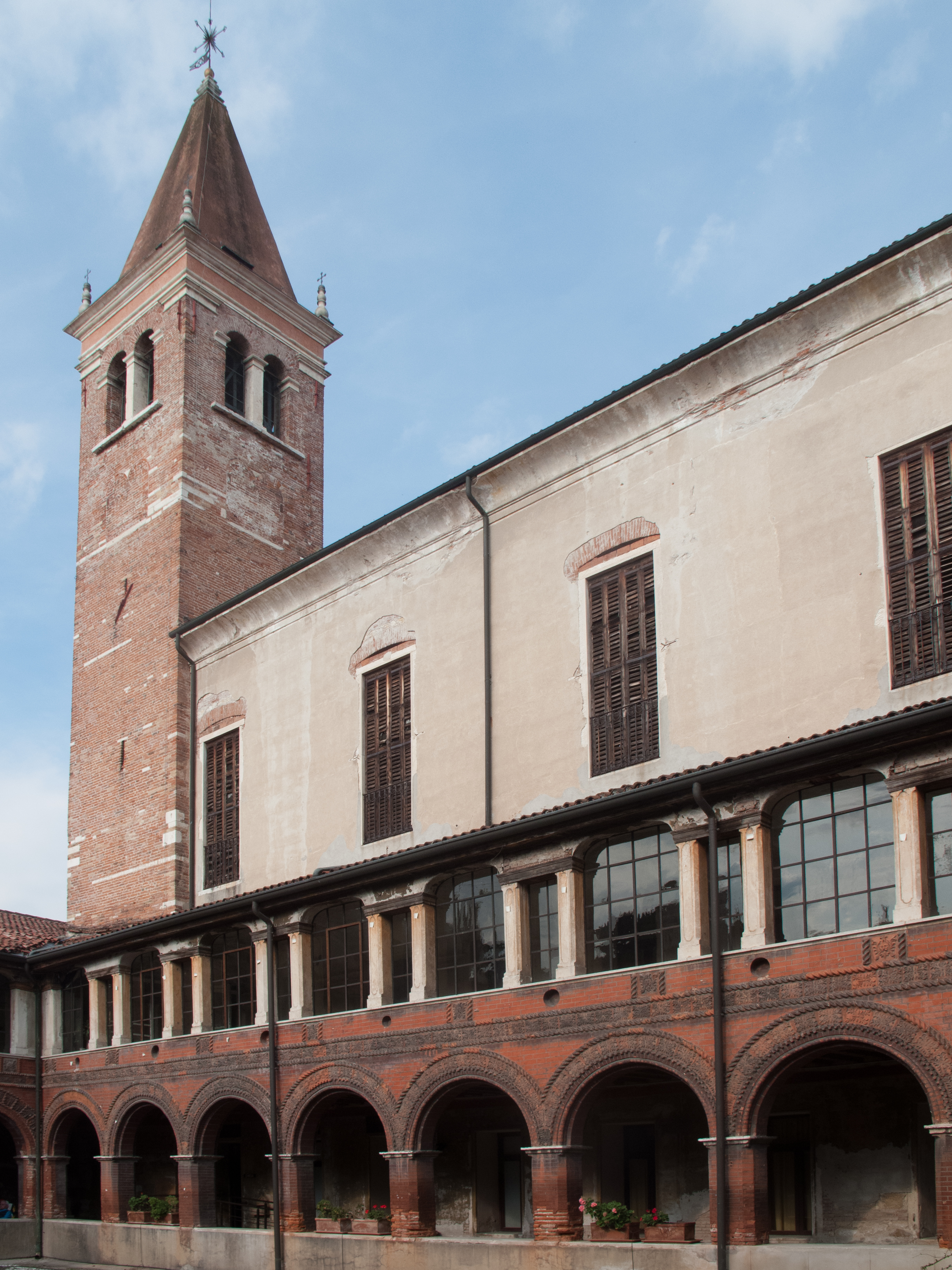
The bell tower and the oratory above the cloister

The bell tower was built in three successive phases: the first in the 13th century, a second intervention raised it in 1417, until in 1552 a final raising was carried out, opening a new belfry; the previous one can be seen in the section below the bifora.

=== The former monastery, now the Trento Institute ===
Documents from the 13th and 14th centuries mention the monastery's curtivum, sala picta, canipa, claustrum, hostium refectorii, dormentorium, braydum, podioglum domine abbatisse, locum capituli, and factoria. In the first decades of the 14th century important works were added, such as the bell tower, muros orti, a domum, a murum granariorum et alia laboreria.

Once the monastery had been suppressed, the architect Bartolomeo Malacarne was given the task of adapting it into a hospice for poor or unemployed workers who, following the industrialization of the factories, had been left without work. Malacarne, made some substantial elevations close to the cloister of San Pietro and demolished the ancient oratory of San Vitale, adjacent to the nuns' parlour, he erected a long, tall, two-storey building to the west of the same cloister, which delimits the vast space in front of the church of San Pietro and, with its grandeur, gives it the dignity of a square.

To connect to the church façade and, at the same time, to create an adequate monumental entrance to the new institute, Malacarne built a short and lower intermediate building, where a large door with an architrave and triangular pediment is flanked by two semicircular niches with a curved arch.

Inside this building, there is a square atrium embellished with Tuscan pilasters, from which one can access, on the right, the chapel that houses the body and some memorabilia of Ottavio Trento; there is also the funerary stele, the only work by Antonio Canova in Vicenza - completed in May 1815, three years after the death of the founder of the institute - which depicts with formal elegance the statue of Happiness writing the merits of Trento on the marble.

=== The cloister ===
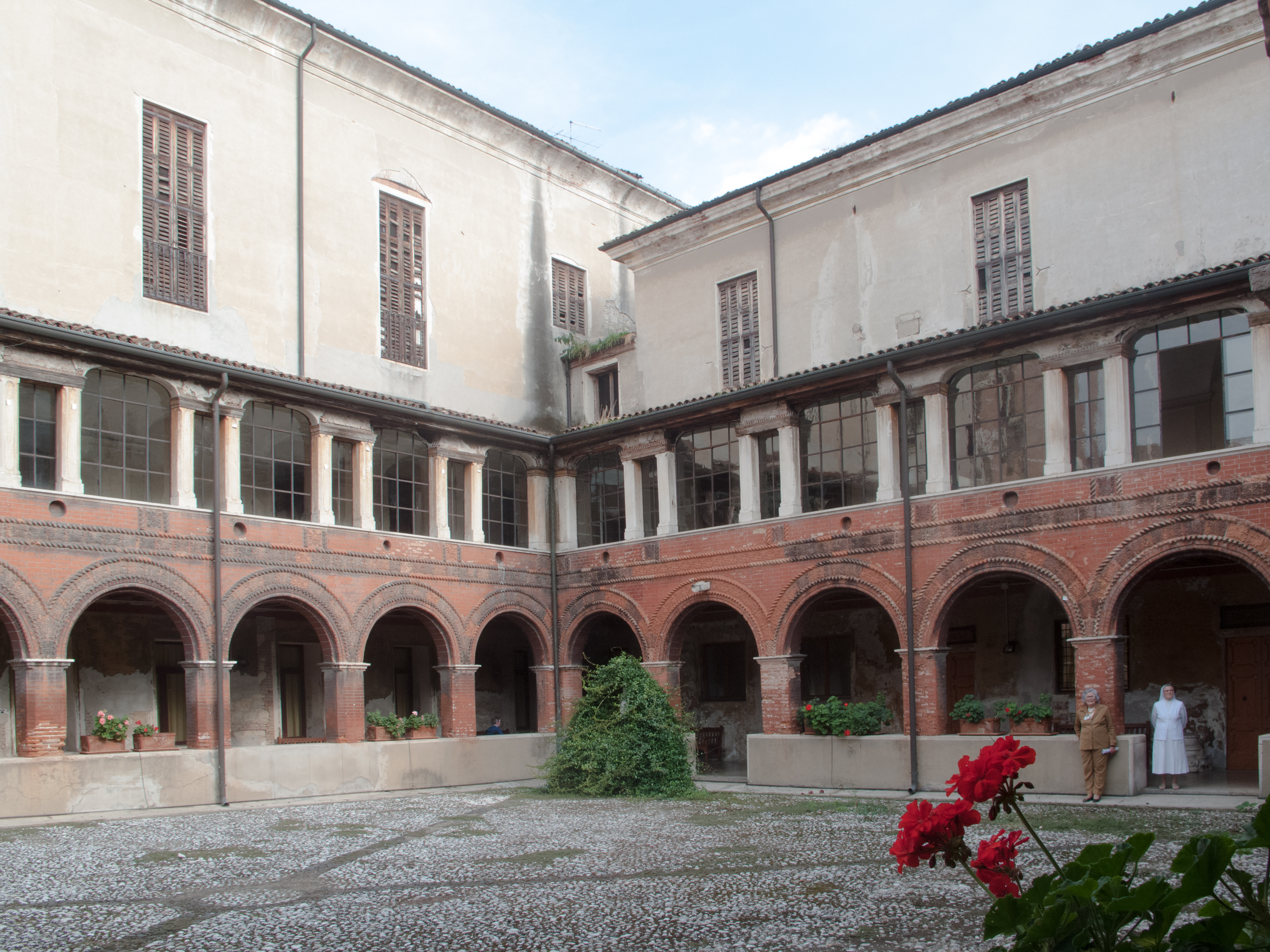
Cloister

The quadrilateral cloister has a lower portico and an upper loggia.

The lower portico has semicircular arches on square brick pillars. Valuable and sophisticated at the same time, it can be dated to around the fifth or sixth decade of the fifteenth century, when the abbess Maria Verde dei Repeta, who governed the convent of San Pietro from 1418 to 1444-1445, had the monastery renovated. The decoration of the cloister is very similar to the extrados of the entrance door in the nearby oratory of the Boccalotti family, attributed to Zanino dei Boccali. In the warm color of terracotta, the arches are decorated with floral elements framed by protruding twists. The unaesthetic wall that takes away the columns' grandeur is the result of the last restoration. The upper part, from the 18th century and closed in modern times by glass windows, repeats the recurring motif of the Serlian in its sequence of segmental arches between smaller architraved elements.

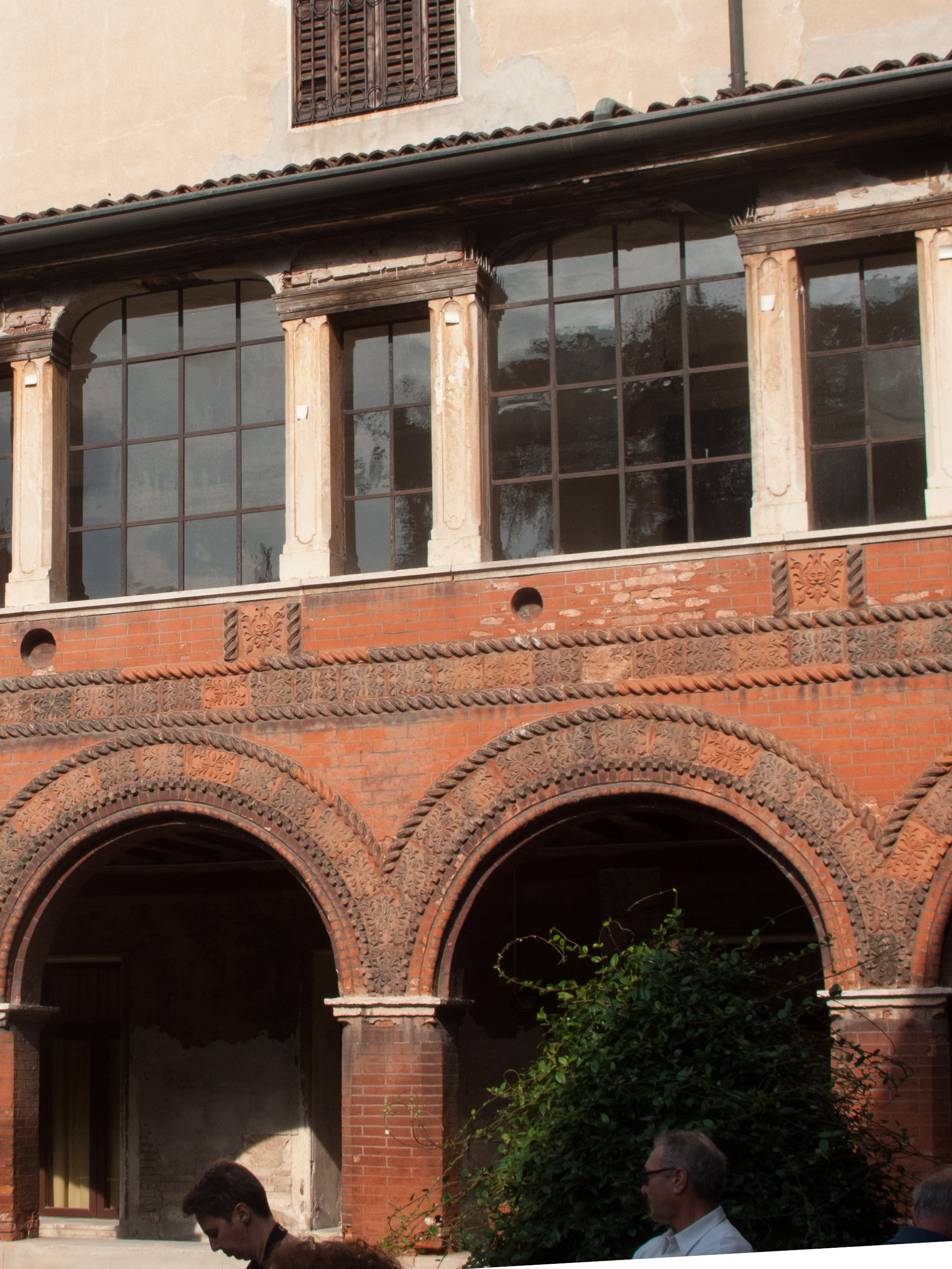
Section of the cloister

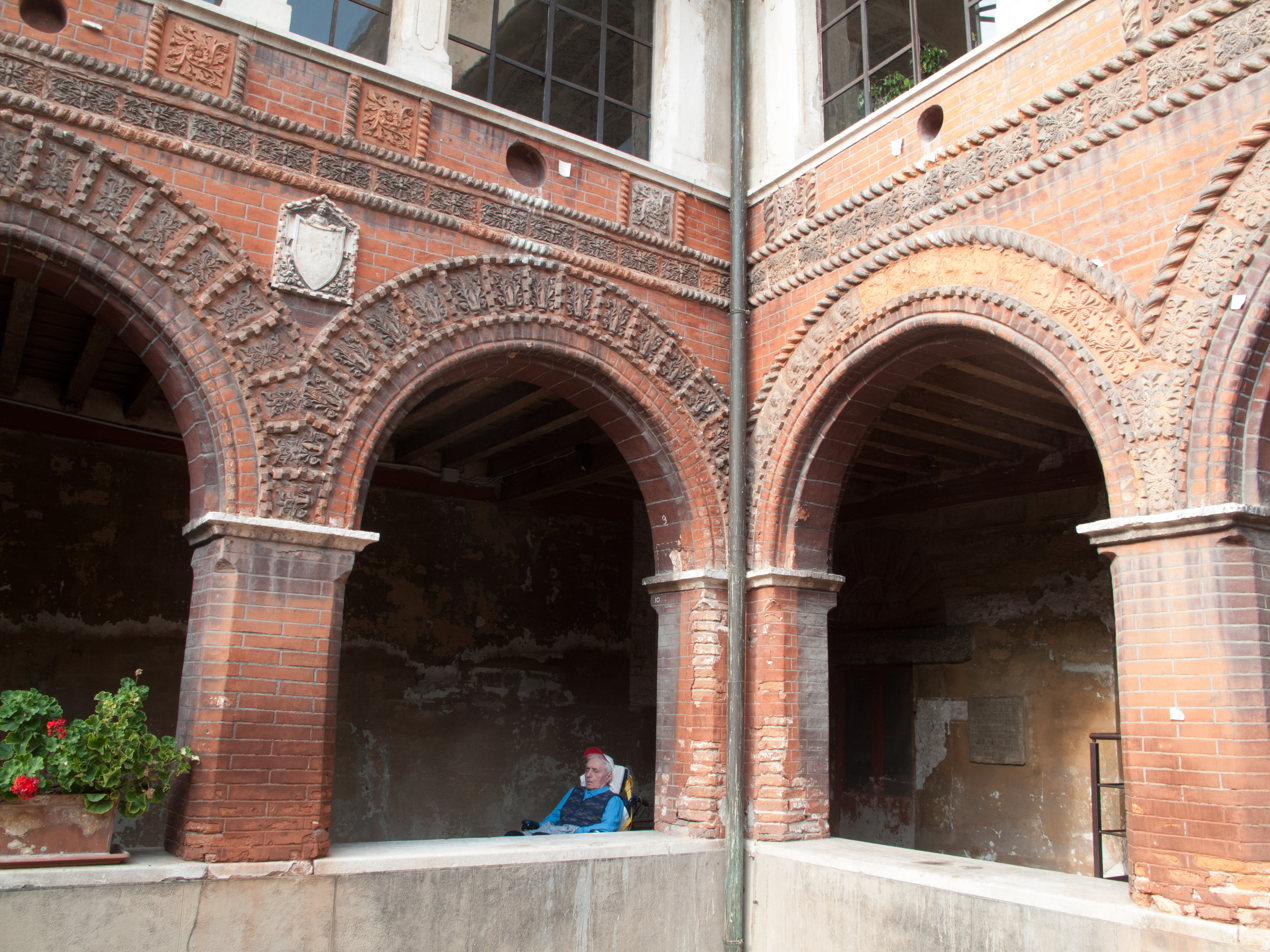
North-east corner of the cloister

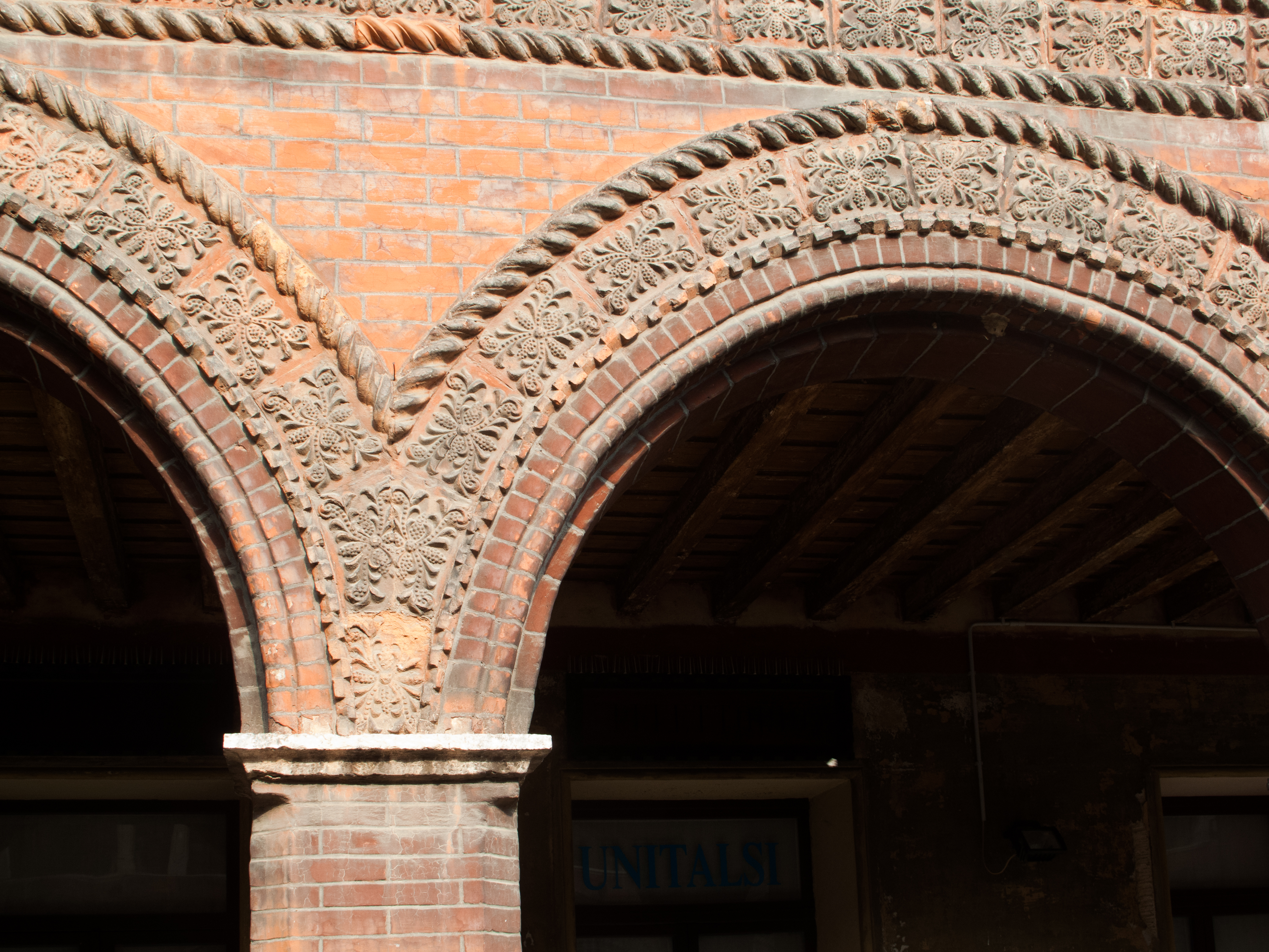
Terracotta arches of the cloister

In the northwest corner of the cloister there is an early medieval stone sarcophagus, possibly Lombard. Above it there is a Roman amphora and, on the right, a Roman funerary tombstone and a fragment of a funerary relief. In the center of the wall are some cannonballs that fell on the church during the Austrian bombardments of June 1848; below, there are two overturned late-Gothic capitals. Near the northeast corner is the old door, now walled up, belonging to the oldest part of the bell tower.

To the right of the door is a Roman tombstone dated 1778 from the Tornieri collection, and further to the left is a door leading to the church with a holy water font next to it; on the top left-hand corner is a recently restored 14th-century fresco of Christ crucified between the Madonna and St. John; below this is a 14th-century sarcophagus of the Scroffa family. On the south side of the cloister are two magnificent capitals, upside down, typical of the late local 15th century, perhaps coming from the demolished loggias of the Palazzo della Ragione, which collapsed in 1496.

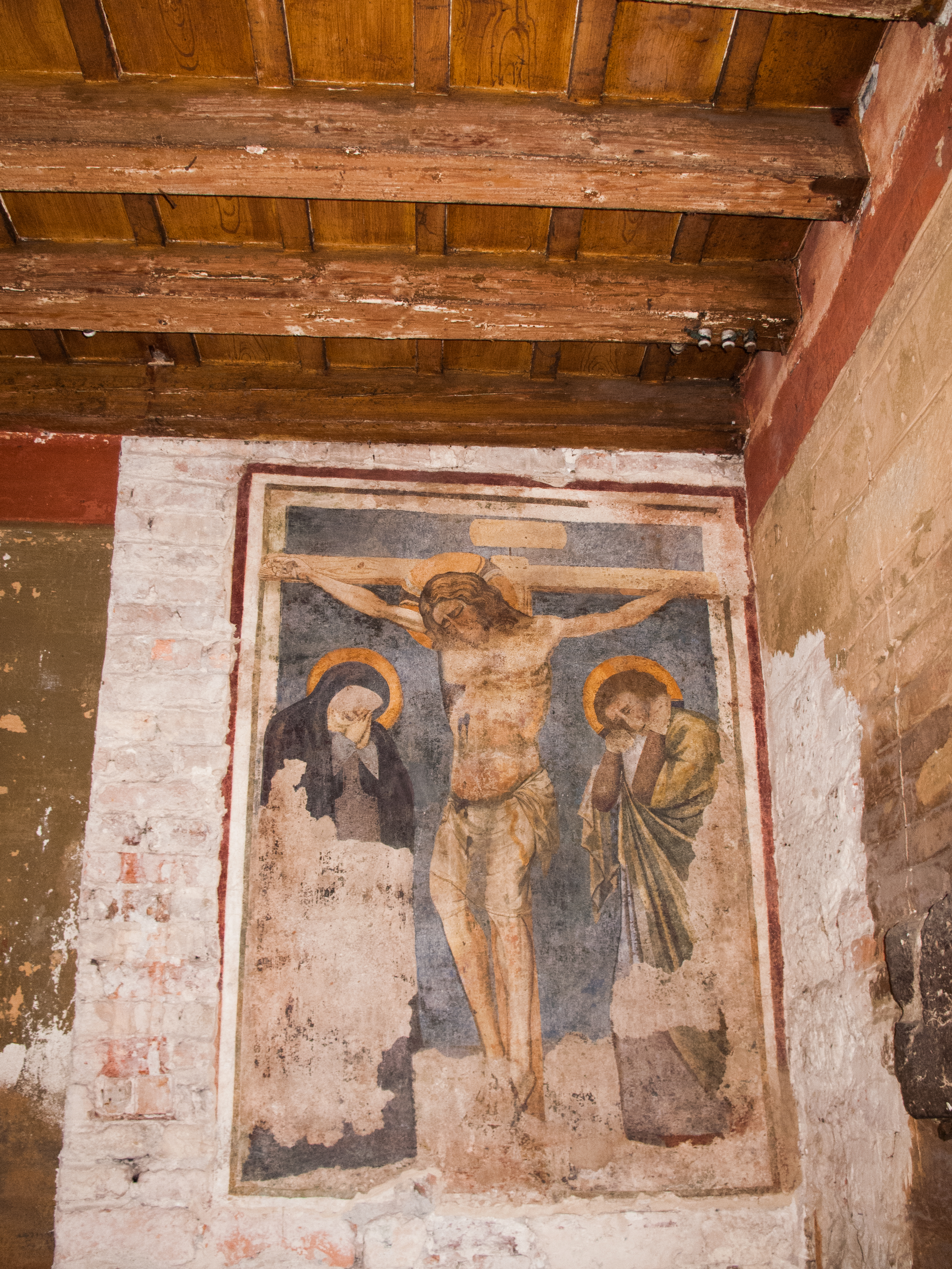
Christ crucified between the Madonna and St. John

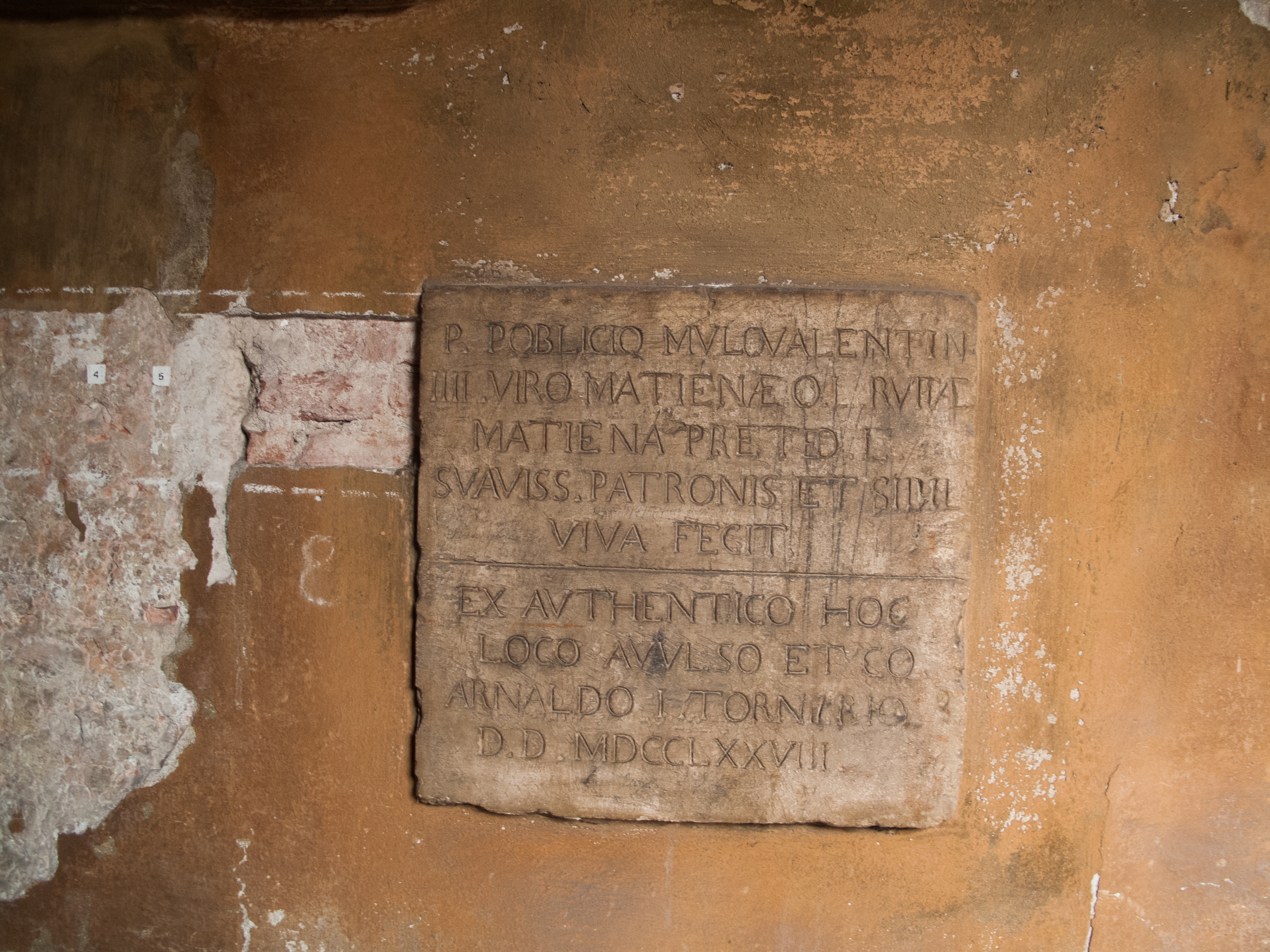
Roman tombstone from 1778

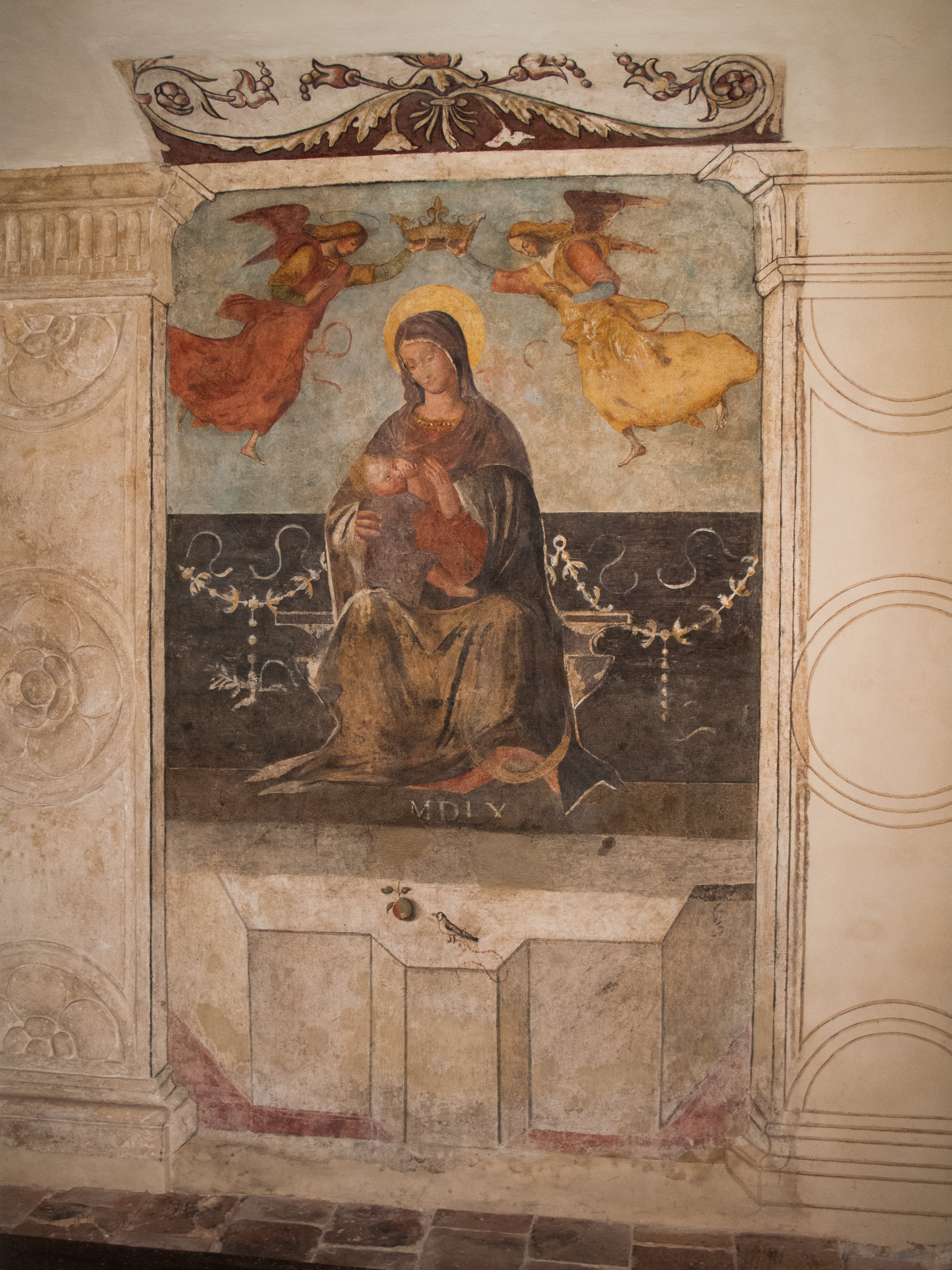
Madonna breastfeeding and two angels

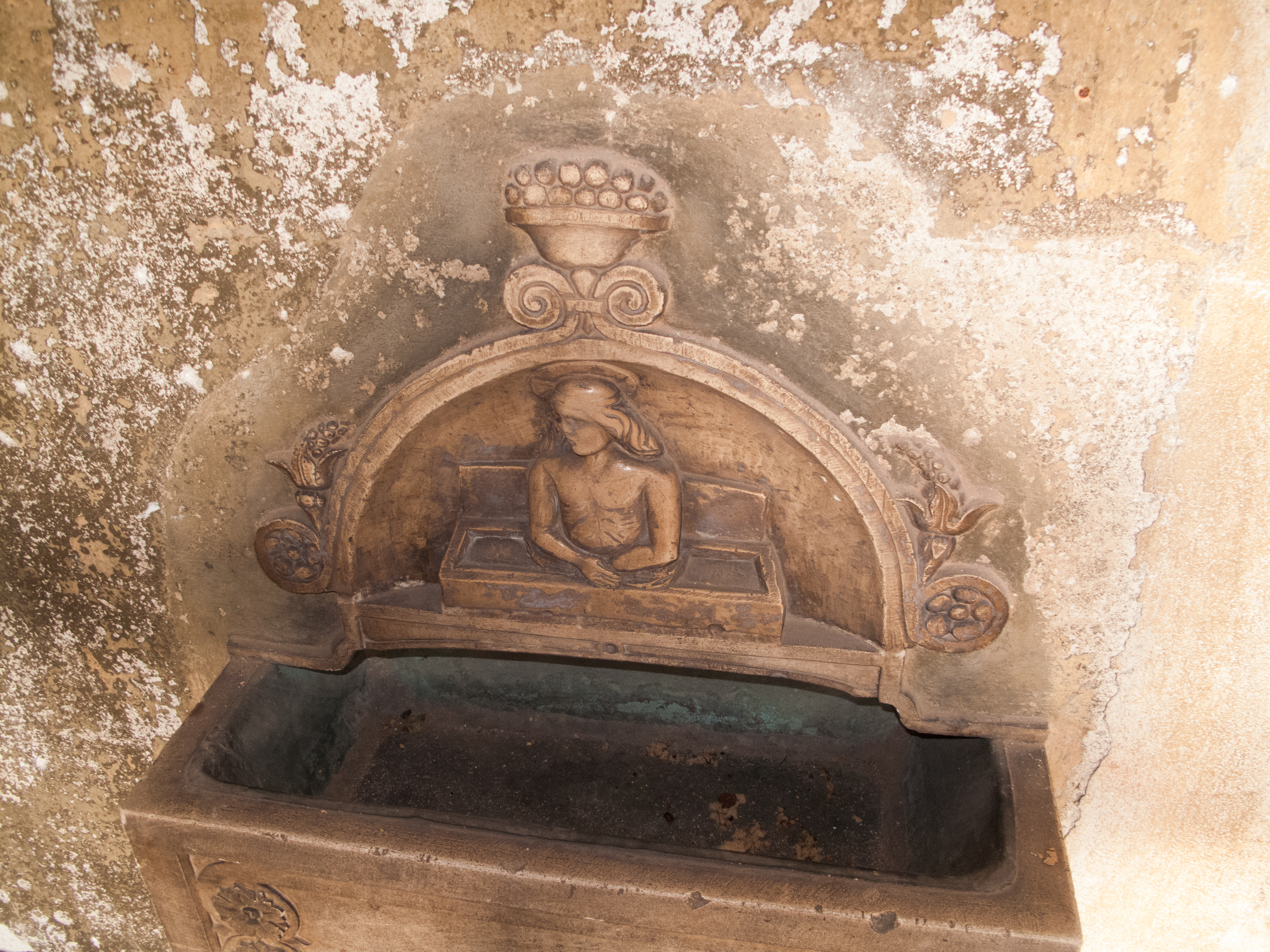
Holy water font

=== The oratory of San Pietro ===
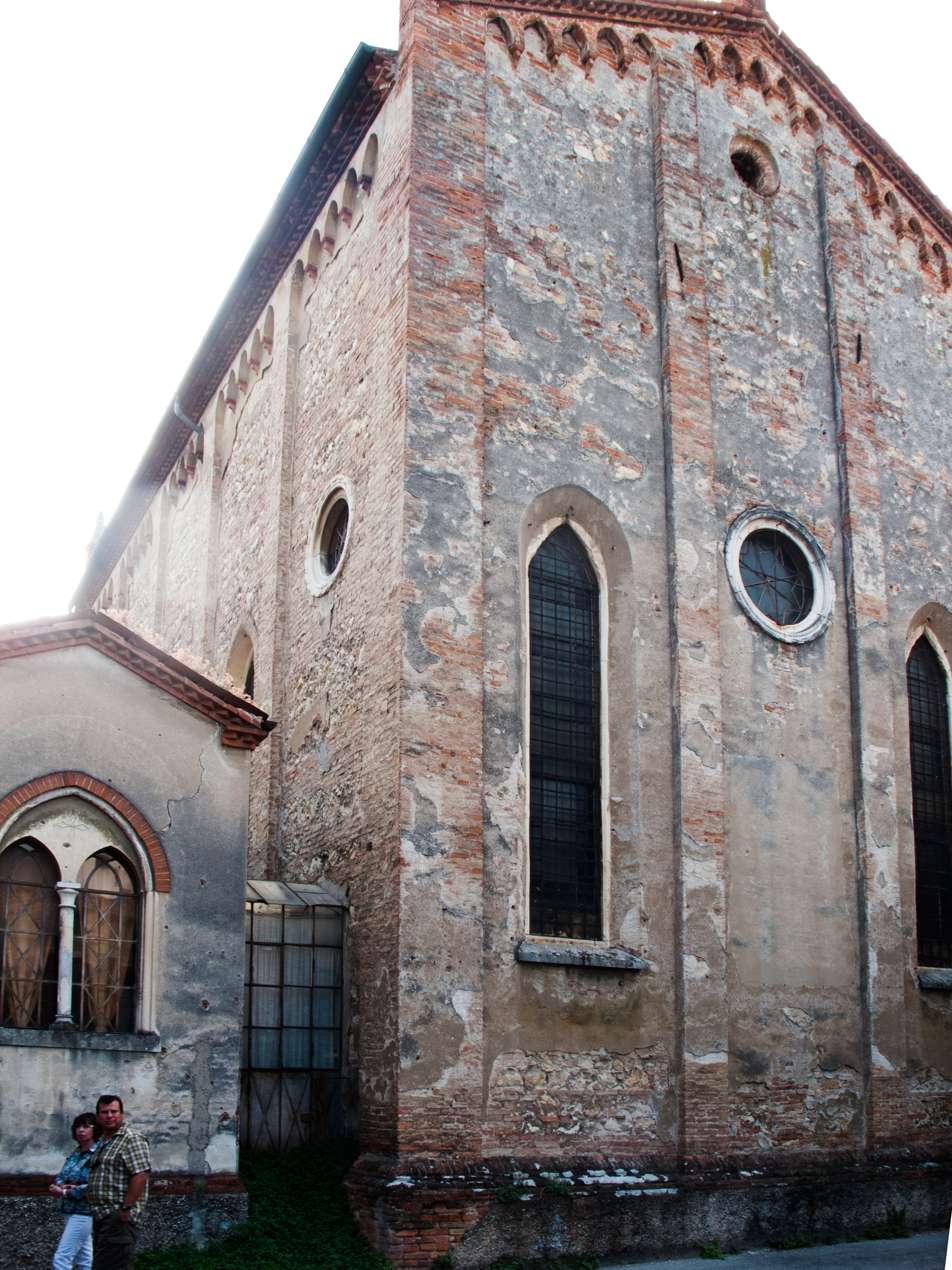
Exterior of the nuns' oratory

From the cloister there is access to the choir of San Pietro or of the nuns, annexed to the apse of the church, a typical structure of the late local 15th century, probably built at the same time as the church itself was restructured. The marked verticality of the building is accentuated by the tall and narrow pilasters that run along the external walls and give rhythm to the sequence of the pointed Lombard bands of the cornice.

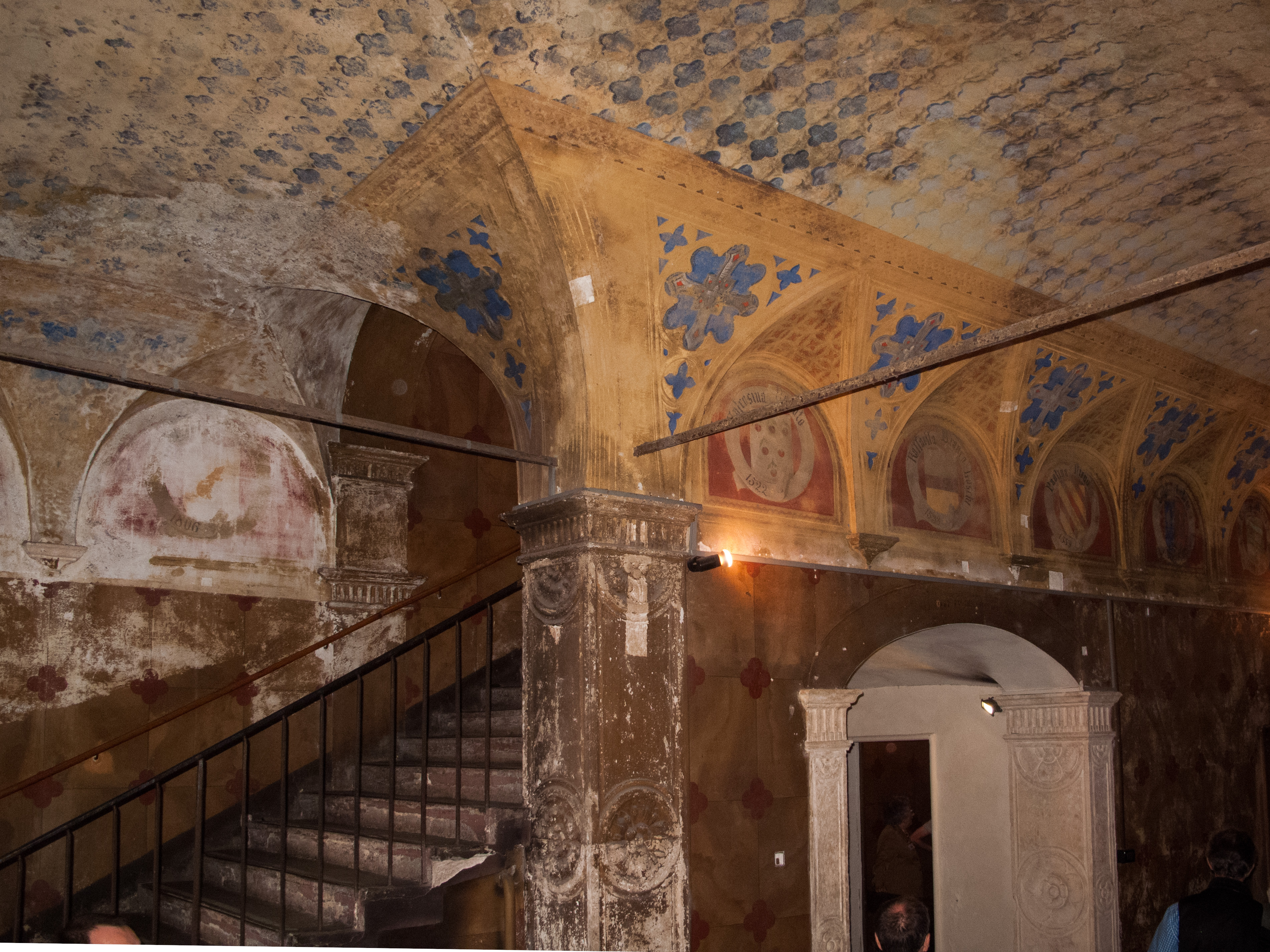
Entrance

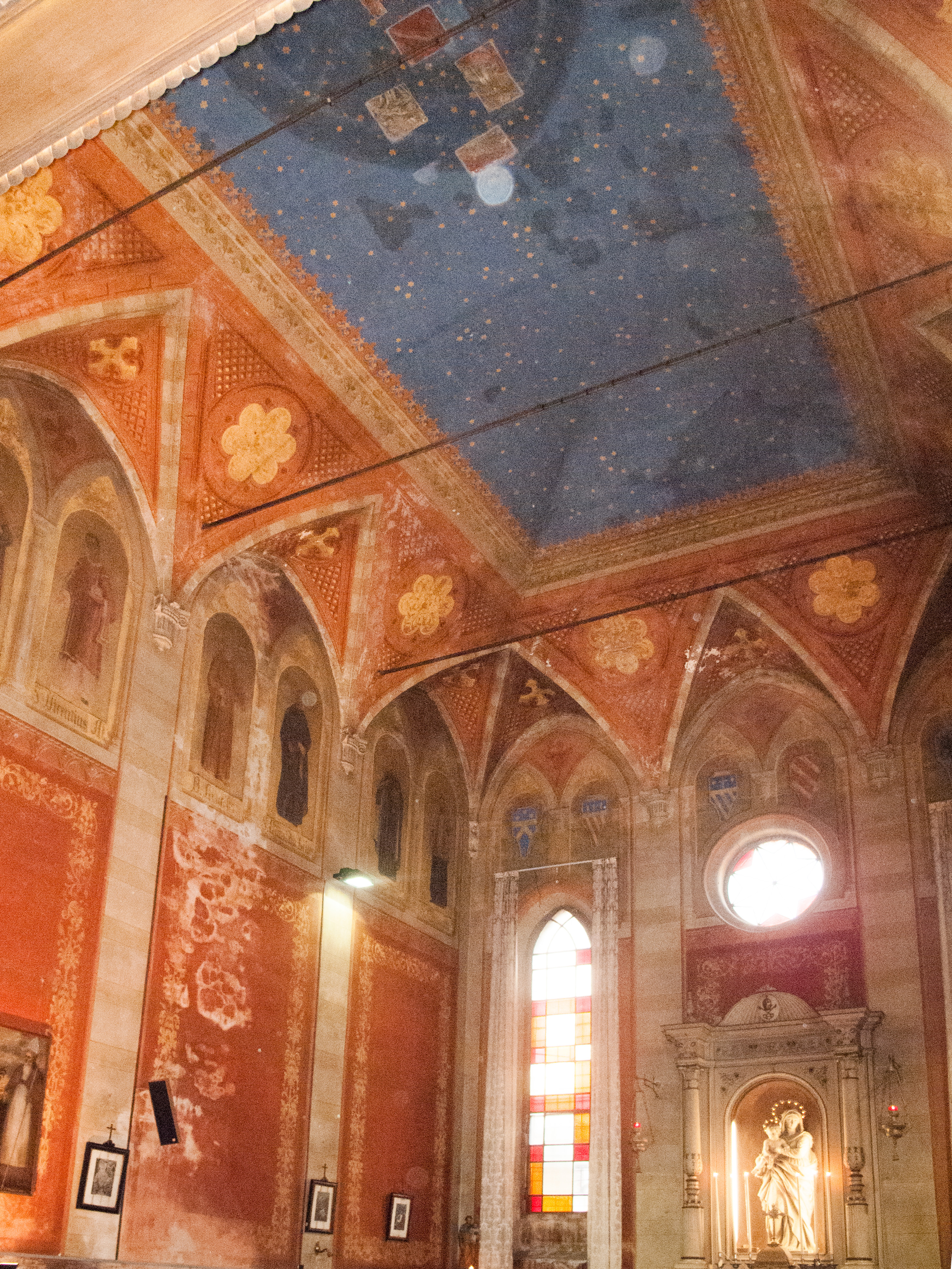
Interior

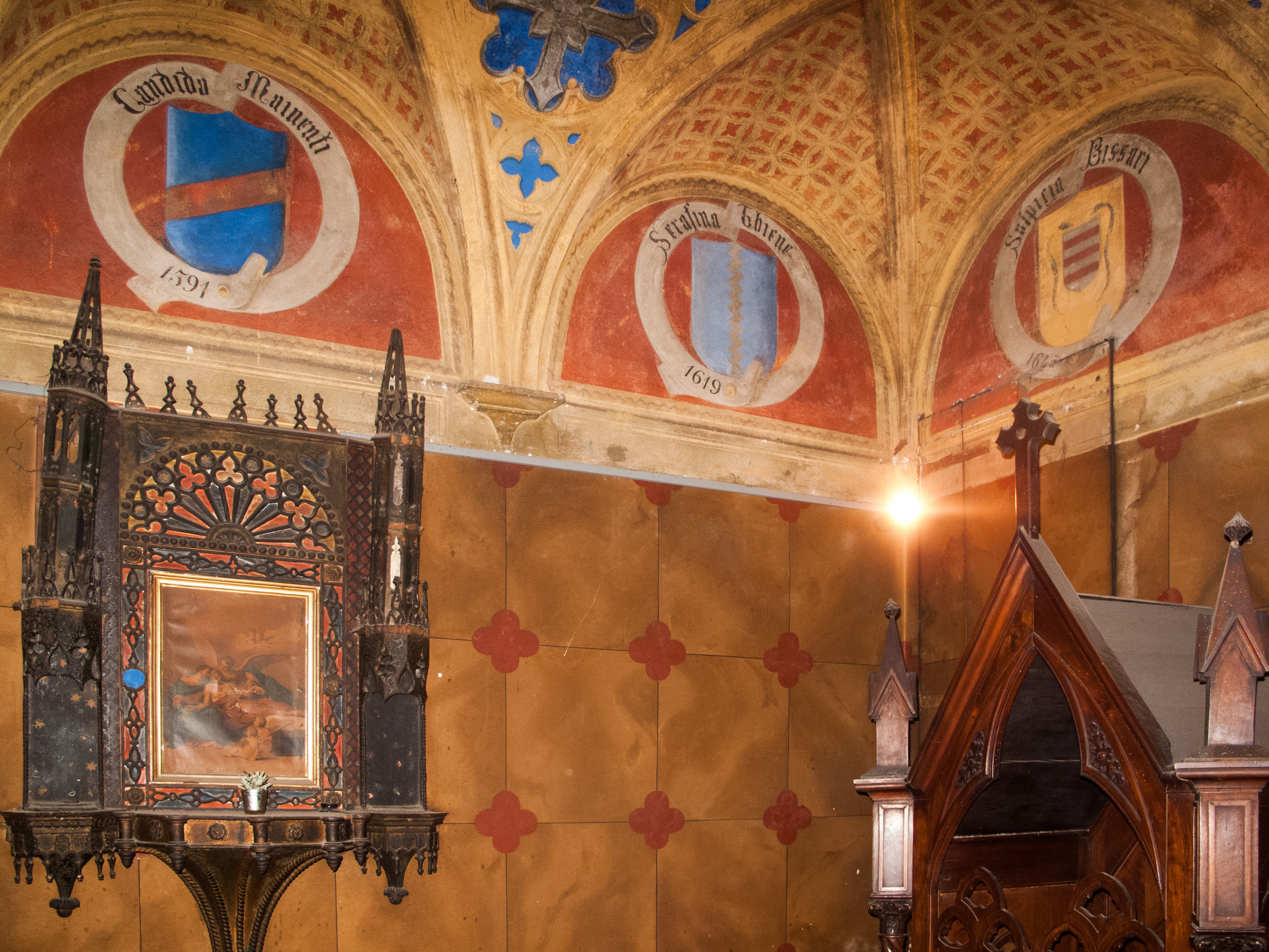
Interior

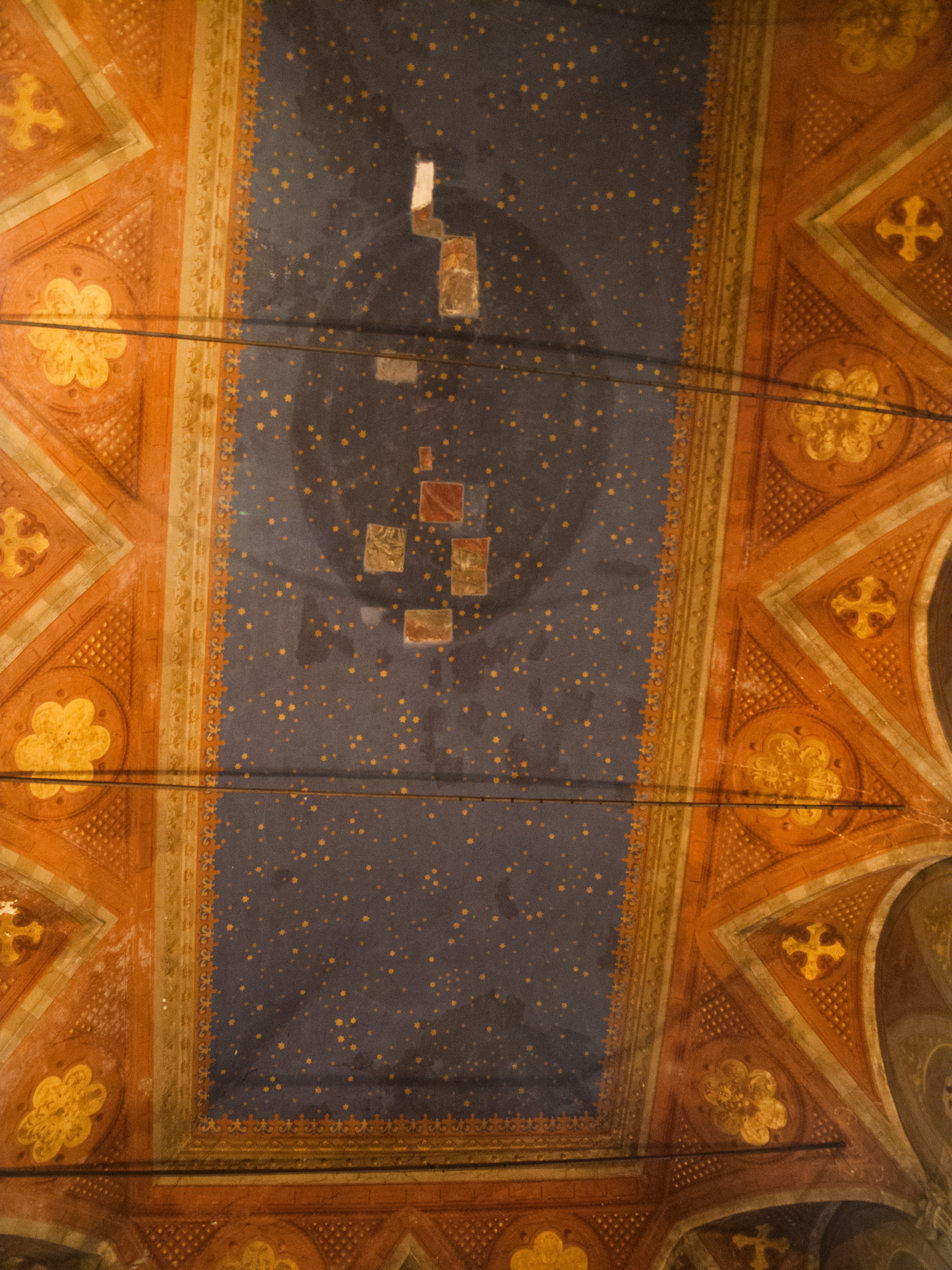
Ceiling

The interior has a single nave, interrupted on the western side by a suspended choir, and covered by a cloister vault supported by lunettes whose corbels rest on suspended capitals, also typical of the late 15th century in Vicenza. On the walls there is a characteristic carpet-like decoration, fake biforas and figures of saints, in a distinctly neo-gothic style, dating from 1894. To the east, on the back wall, there is a 19th-century wooden altar with a statue of the Madonna and Child, dating from the 18th century, in the niche.

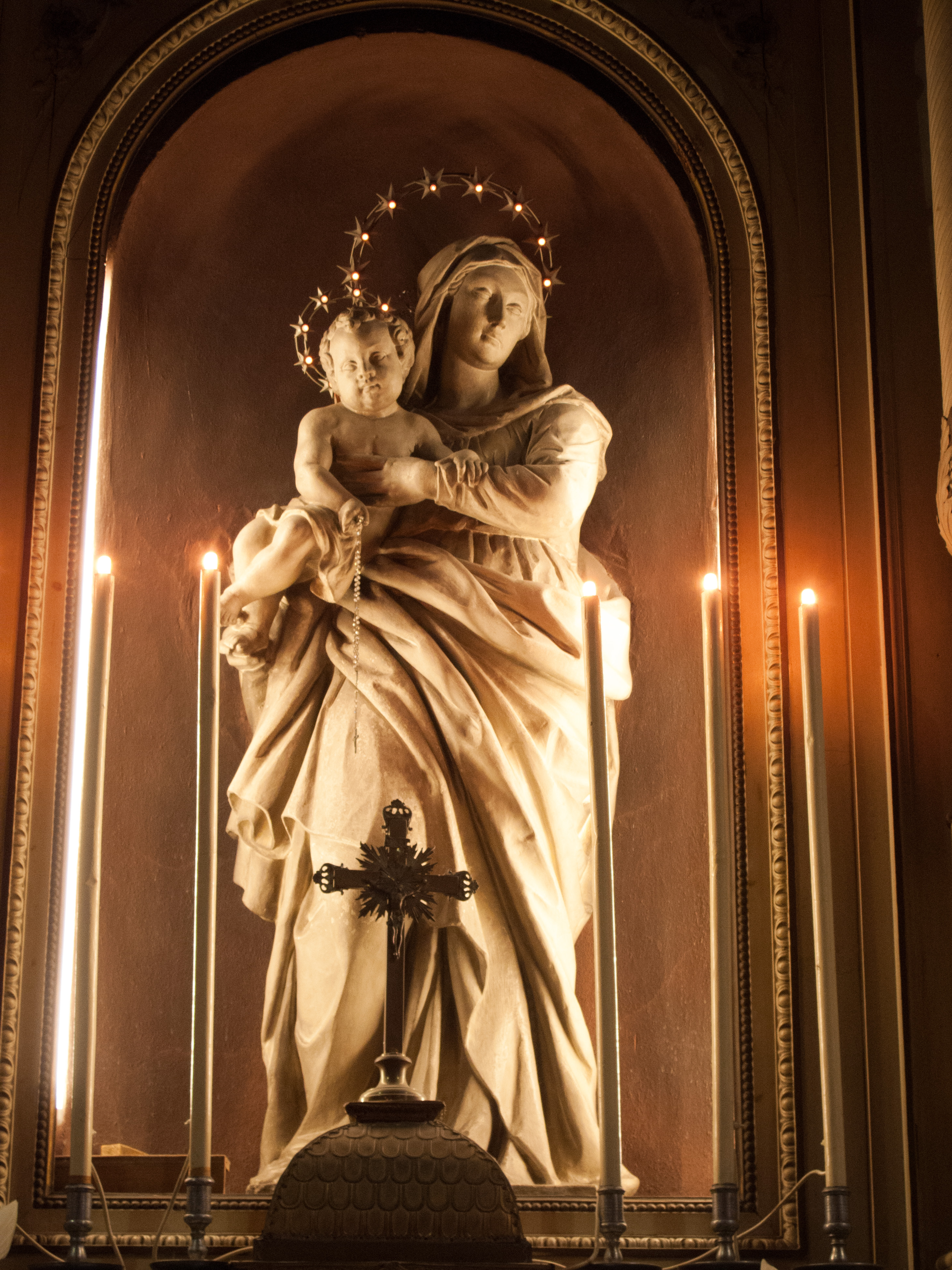
Madonna from the 18th century

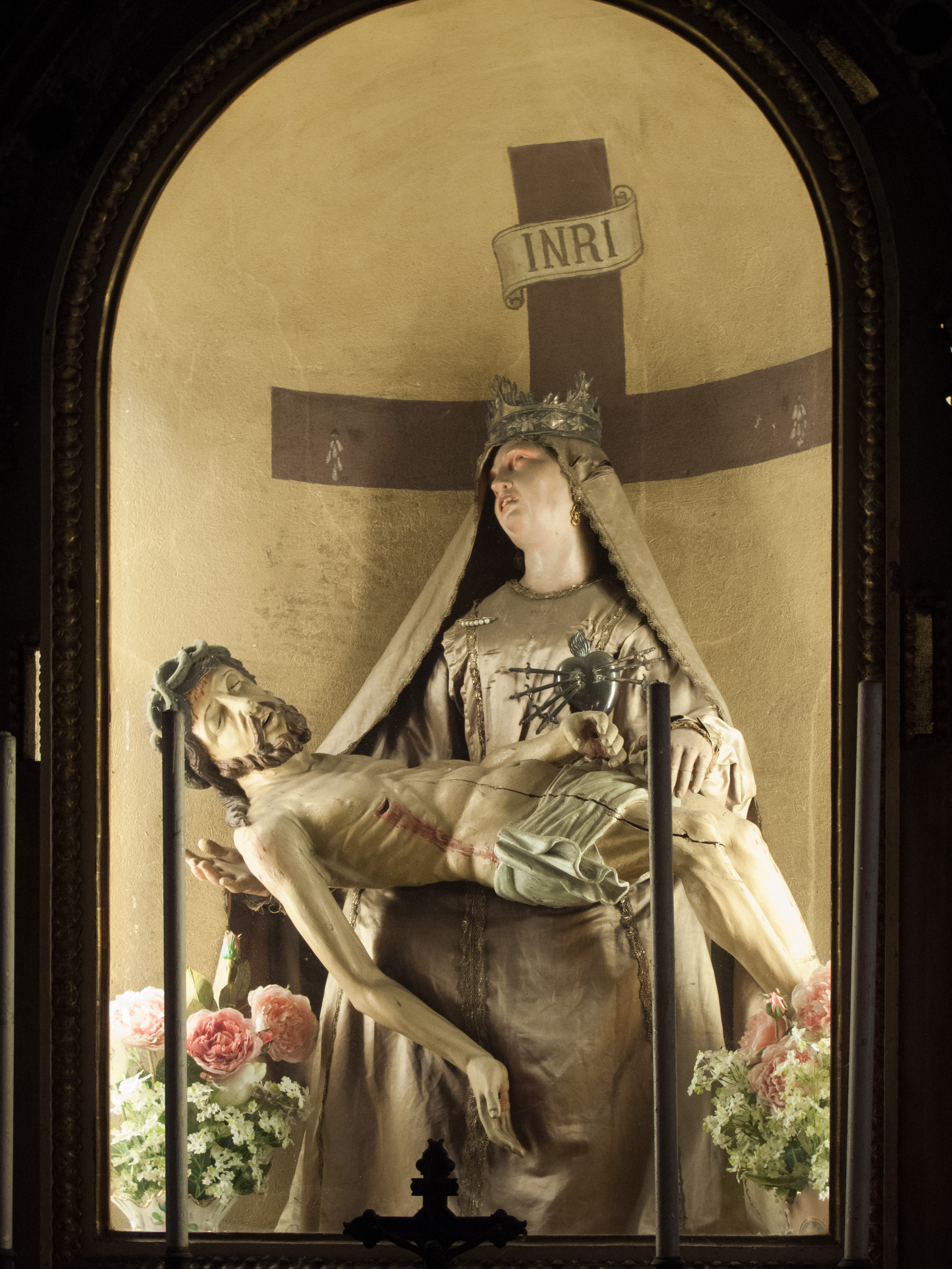
Pietà

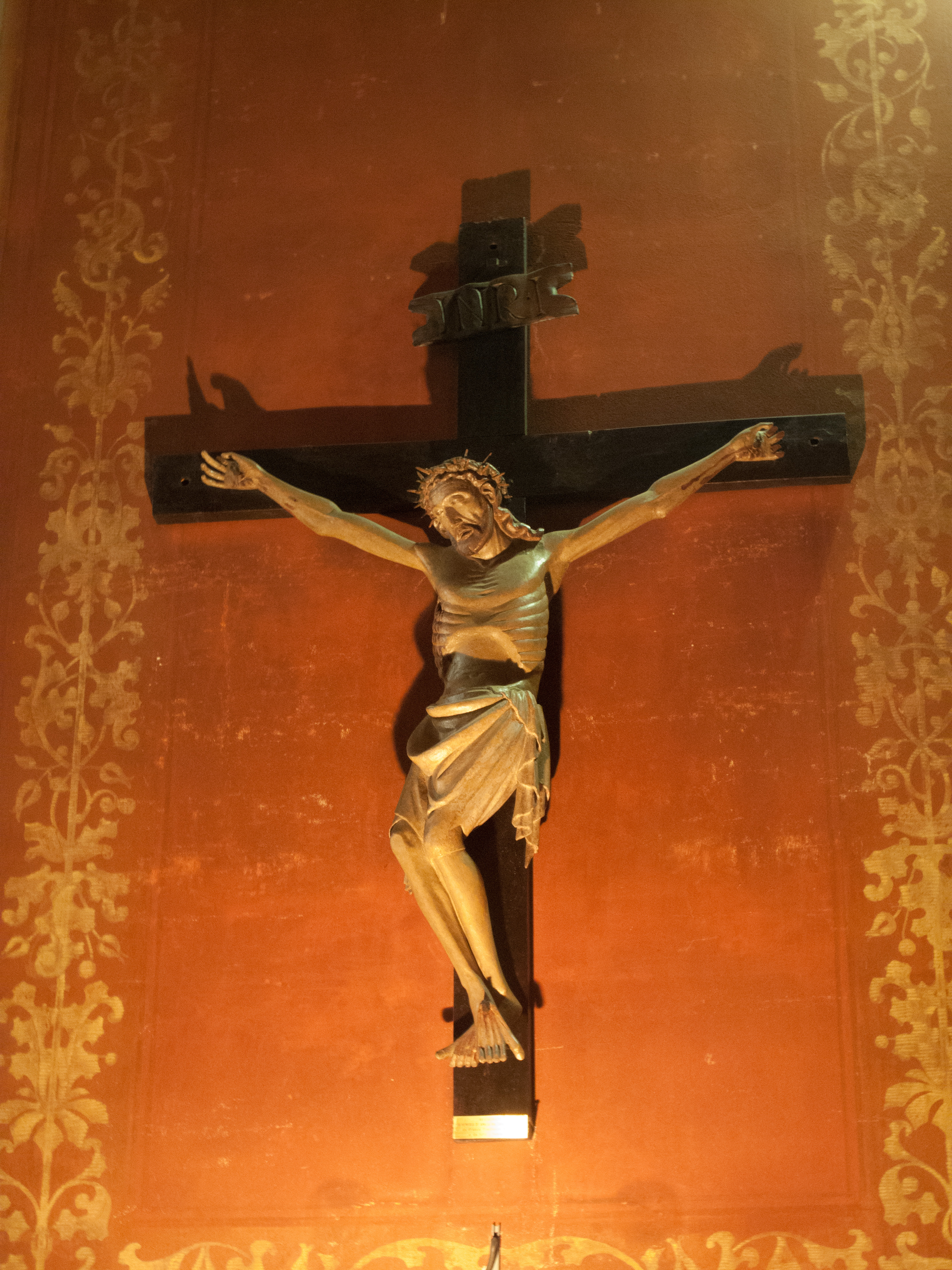
Crucifix of the 15th century

On the south wall, there is an imposing wooden crucifix from the 15th century; opposite, on the north wall, there is a painting of Saints Vitalis (in the center, dressed as a warrior), Peter and Prosdocimus, dated 1580 and attributed to Giambattista Maganza the Elder, the only surviving element from the ancient oratory of San Vitale, once located on the site to the right of the current atrium of the Istituto Ottavio Trento and demolished in the second decade of the 19th century.

== See also ==
- Basilica of Saints Felix and Fortunatus
- History of religious life in Vicenza
- History of religious architecture in Vicenza

== Bibliography ==
- Various authors (1997). Chiesa di San Pietro in Vicenza – Storia, fede, arte [Church of San Pietro in Vicenza – History, faith, art] (in Italian). Vicenza: Tipografia U.T.VI.
- Barbieri, Franco (2004). Vicenza, ritratto di una città [Vicenza, portrait of a city] (in Italian). Vicenza: Angelo Colla editore. ISBN 88-900990-7-0.
- Bortolan, Domenico (1884). I privilegi antichi del Monastero di S. Pietro in Vicenza illustrati [The ancient privileges of the Monastery of S. Pietro in Vicenza illustrated] (in Italian). Vicenza: Tip. San Giuseppe.
- Mantese, Giovanni (1952). Memorie storiche della Chiesa vicentina, I, Dalle origini al Mille [Historical records of the Vicenza Church, I, From its origins to the year 1000] (in Italian). Vicenza: Accademia Olimpica.
- Mantese, Giovanni (1954). Memorie storiche della Chiesa vicentina, II, Dal Mille al Milletrecento [Historical records of the Vicenza Church, II, From the year 1000 to the year 1300] (in Italian). Vicenza: Accademia Olimpica.
- Mantese, Giovanni (1958). Memorie storiche della Chiesa vicentina, III/1, Il Trecento [Historical records of the Vicenza Church, III/1, The 14th century] (in Italian). Vicenza: Accademia Olimpica.
- Mantese, Giovanni (1964). Memorie storiche della Chiesa vicentina, III/2, Dal 1404 al 1563 [Historical records of the Vicenza Church, III/2, From 1404 to 1563] (in Italian). Vicenza: Accademia Olimpica.
