= Basilica of Saints Felix and Fortunatus =

Church in Vicenza, Italy

Coordinates: 45°32′39″N 11°31′59″E

- Basilica dei Santi Felice e Fortunato
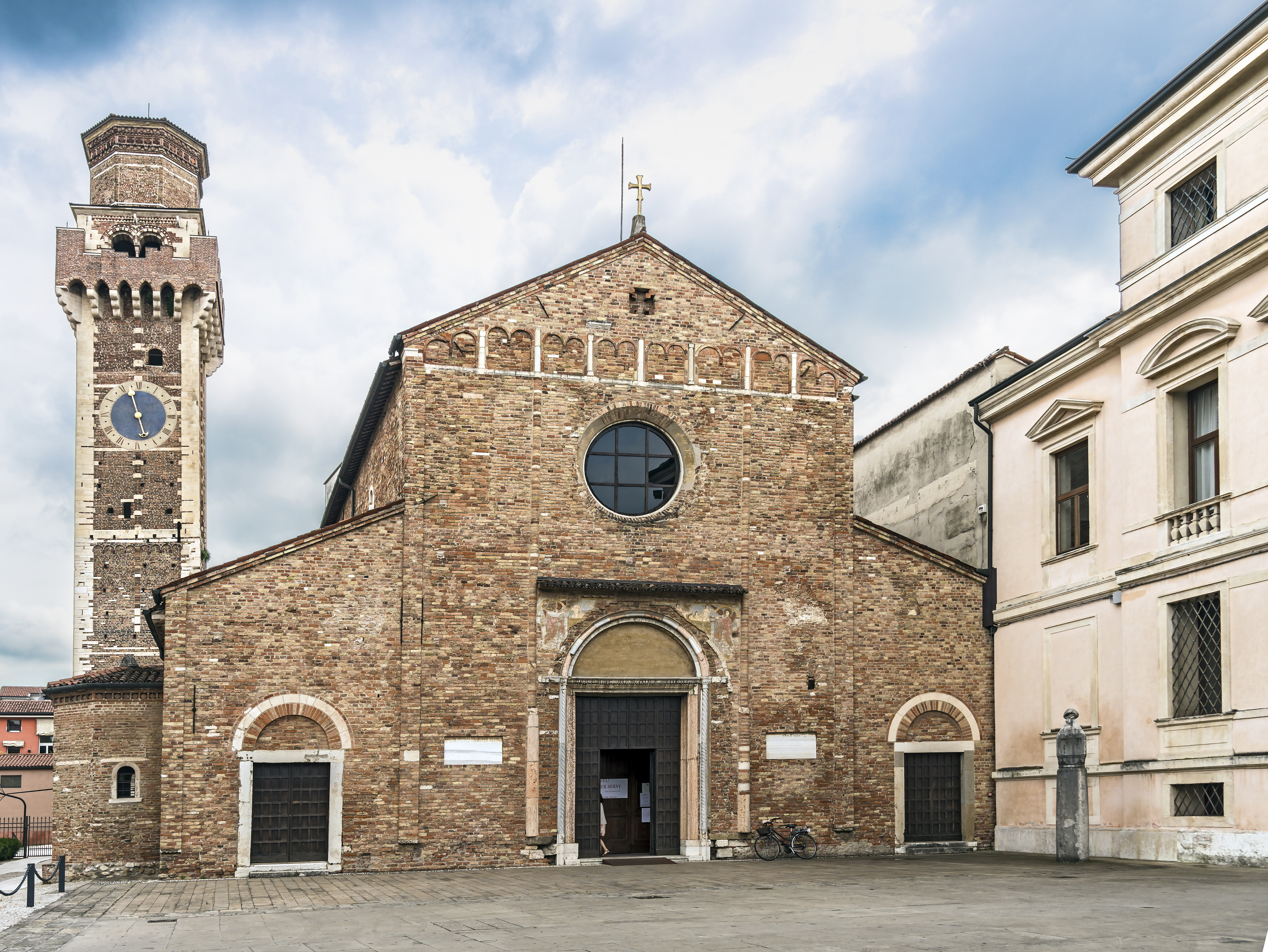
- The facade
- Basilica of Saints Felix and Fortunatus
- Location: Vicenza, Veneto, Italy
- Denomination: Catholic

Architecture
- Style: Pre-Romanesque architecture
- Groundbreaking: 4th century

Administration
- Diocese: Roman Catholic Diocese of Vicenza

The basilica of Saints Felix and Fortunatus is a church in Vicenza, currently a parish church, whose origin dates back to the 4th–5th centuries; its current Romanesque appearance is mainly due to the reconstruction of the 12th century and the restorations of the 20th century.

For more than a millennium, the basilica was attached to the most important Benedictine abbey in the Vicenza area.

== Early history ==
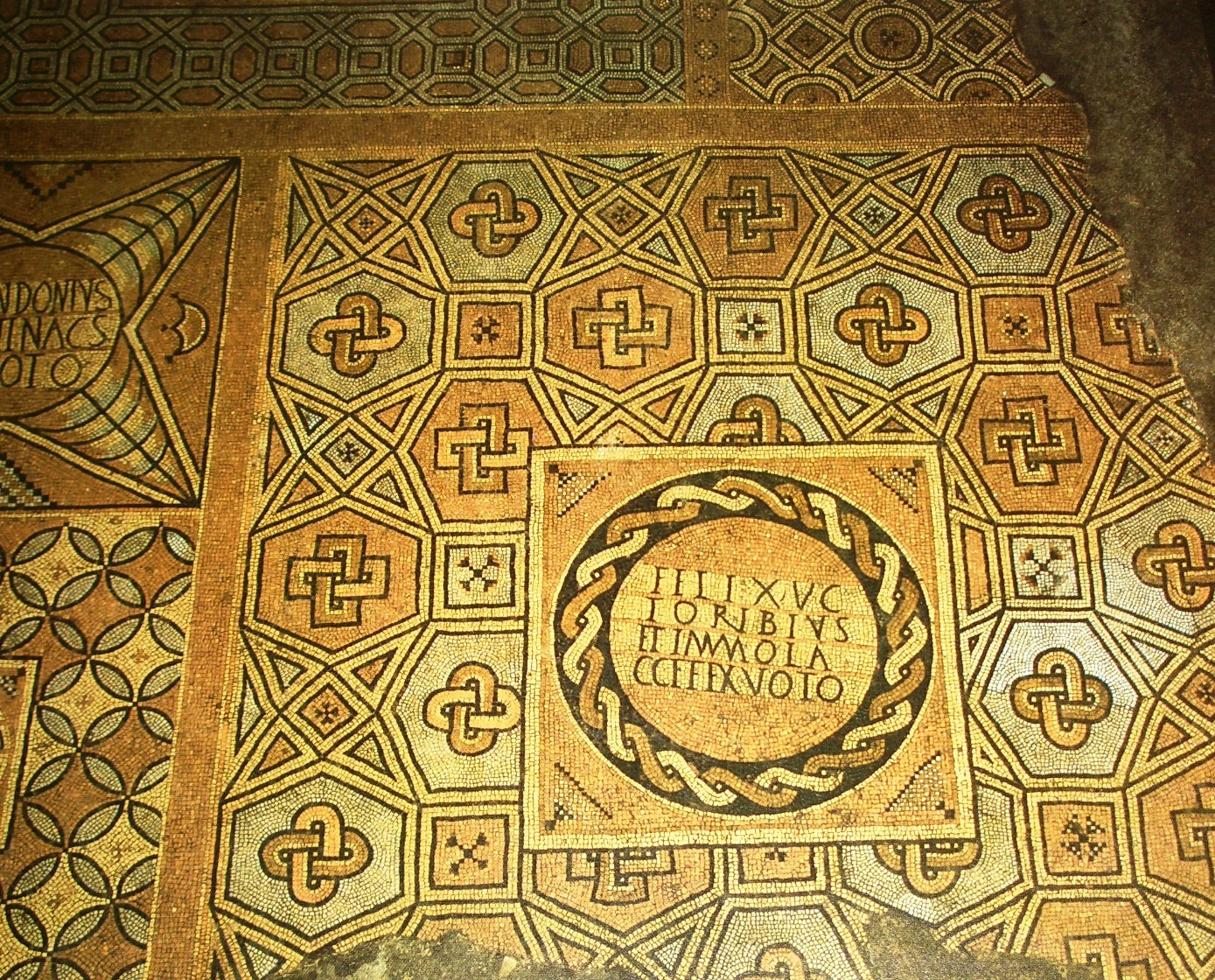
The mosaic in the center of the basilica

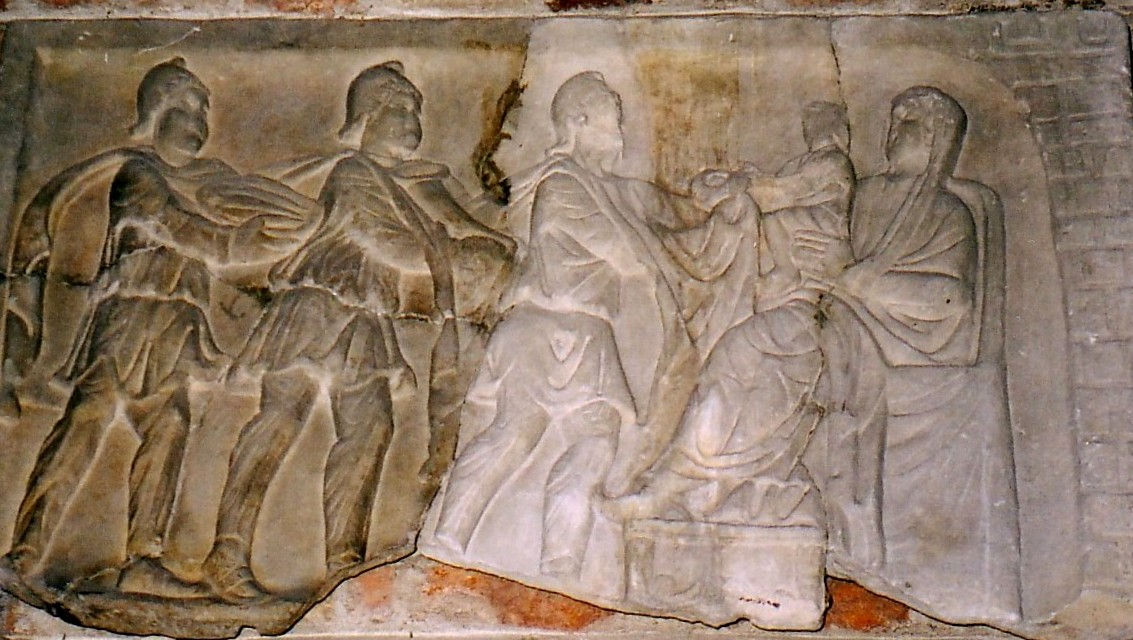
Adoration of the Magi

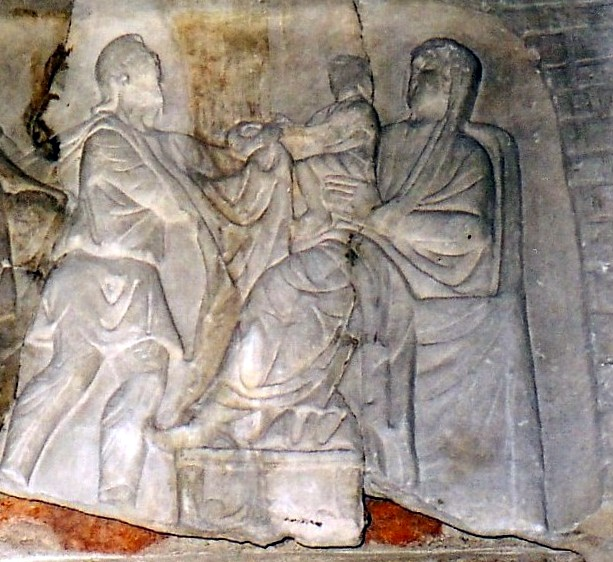
Detail of the adoration of the Magi

On the site where the basilica stands today, there existed in Roman times a pagan necropolis—located just outside the walls, along the Via Postumia route—which extended over a rather large area, partly marshy, in which numerous burial artifacts were found, such as cappuccina tombs, aedicule tombs, sarcophagi, stelae and inscriptions, coins, and grave goods.

Following the Edict of Milan that allowed Christian worship, the faithful of Vicenza reserved an area in the necropolis for the burial of their dead and constructed a building there for worship: the finds represent the first evidence of the Christian faith in the city. The stele of the Adoration of the Magi, the most important evidence of the Christian cemetery, also dates to this period—the end of the 4th century.

=== The early church ===
The early church—built in the style typical of the earliest Christian worship halls in the Po Valley region between the mid and late 4th century—was a single hall measuring 24 x 16.5 meters, identifiable through a layer of red marble in the floor of the present church, and was decorated with a rich mosaic pavement consisting largely of votive offerings, partly preserved and brought to light, along with part of the foundations, in the mid-20th century.

This building shows how the Christian community of Vicenza had already achieved considerable importance in the first half of the 4th century, as evidenced by the fact that a senatorial family also contributed to the construction of the mosaic floor.

=== The tripartite basilica ===
After the removal of the relics of the martyr Felix from Aquileia, probably around 380, the church proved insufficient for the needs of the now numerous faithful, and it was decided to build a more imposing structure.

Thus, between the end of the 4th and the middle of the 5th century, a full-fledged basilica was built, with a solemn and majestic layout, with three naves separated by two rows of pillars, measuring 45 × 22 meters; like the earlier church, the nave was also paved with mosaics and extended into a rectangular apse.

In front of the basilica, a 7m deep atrium, the narthex, as a resting place for penitents and a reception place for pilgrims visiting relics, a large quadriporticus, and propylaea formed a 41.5 × 25 m extension; all in all, it was an imposing building, 86.5 m long. The plan was similar to that of St. Ambrose in Milan, also a large suburban basilica dedicated to the veneration of the city's saints.

A sacellum and baptistery were also erected near the basilica.

=== The sacellum or Martyrion ===
The sacellum—one of the most remarkable and best-preserved early Christian buildings in Italy—was built shortly after the mid-5th century and was originally meant to correspond to the Martyrion intended to house the basilica's relics. Later, probably in the 7th–8th centuries, it was dedicated to Mary: in front of the altar, above a cornice supported by four columns, it read:

Hoc oratorium B.M. Matris Domini Gregorius sublimis vir referendarius
a fundamentis aedificavit et in Christi nomine dicavit

It continued to function as a place of worship for the martyrs until 1674, when the complex was transformed into a service room for the adjoining monastery; windows were opened and the original small windows closed, the portal remodeled, the marble covering removed, and the martyrs' remains moved to the crypt of the basilica and placed in opulent Baroque-style gilded wooden reliquaries.

=== The baptistery ===
The foundations of another building with an octagonal plan, found in the 1943 excavations, by its structure, planimetric position, and elevation plane in relation to the ancient church, lead to the conclusion that it was the ancient baptistery, built at the same time as the basilica. Because of its presence, some historians have believed that San Felice was the first cathedral of Vicenza.

However, there is no record in the available documentation that the city was already an episcopal see in the 5th century, as were many others in the Venetiae; among the numerous records of the presence of Venetian bishops at councils in northern Italy, there is no mention of a native of Vicenza until the late 6th century, when Orontius is mentioned.

It can be assumed that the construction of two churches, Santa Maria Annunciata inside the city and San Felice outside the walls, may have corresponded to the needs of the Christian community at that time: communal prayer, catechesis, and the celebration of the Eucharist and other sacraments, which, however, could also be celebrated by the bishop of another city on a pastoral visit or by a priest delegated by him. It is likely that, until the end of the 6th century, the community of Vicenza referred to the bishop and diocese of Padua, a city on which it also gravitated from the civil point of view, and became autonomous only after the establishment of the Lombard Kingdom, of which Padua was not initially a part.

== Middle Ages ==
During Lombard and Carolingian rule (6th century to 9th century), the basilica was enriched with ornaments that are still partly preserved in the masonry.

=== The flourishing period of the Benedictine abbey ===
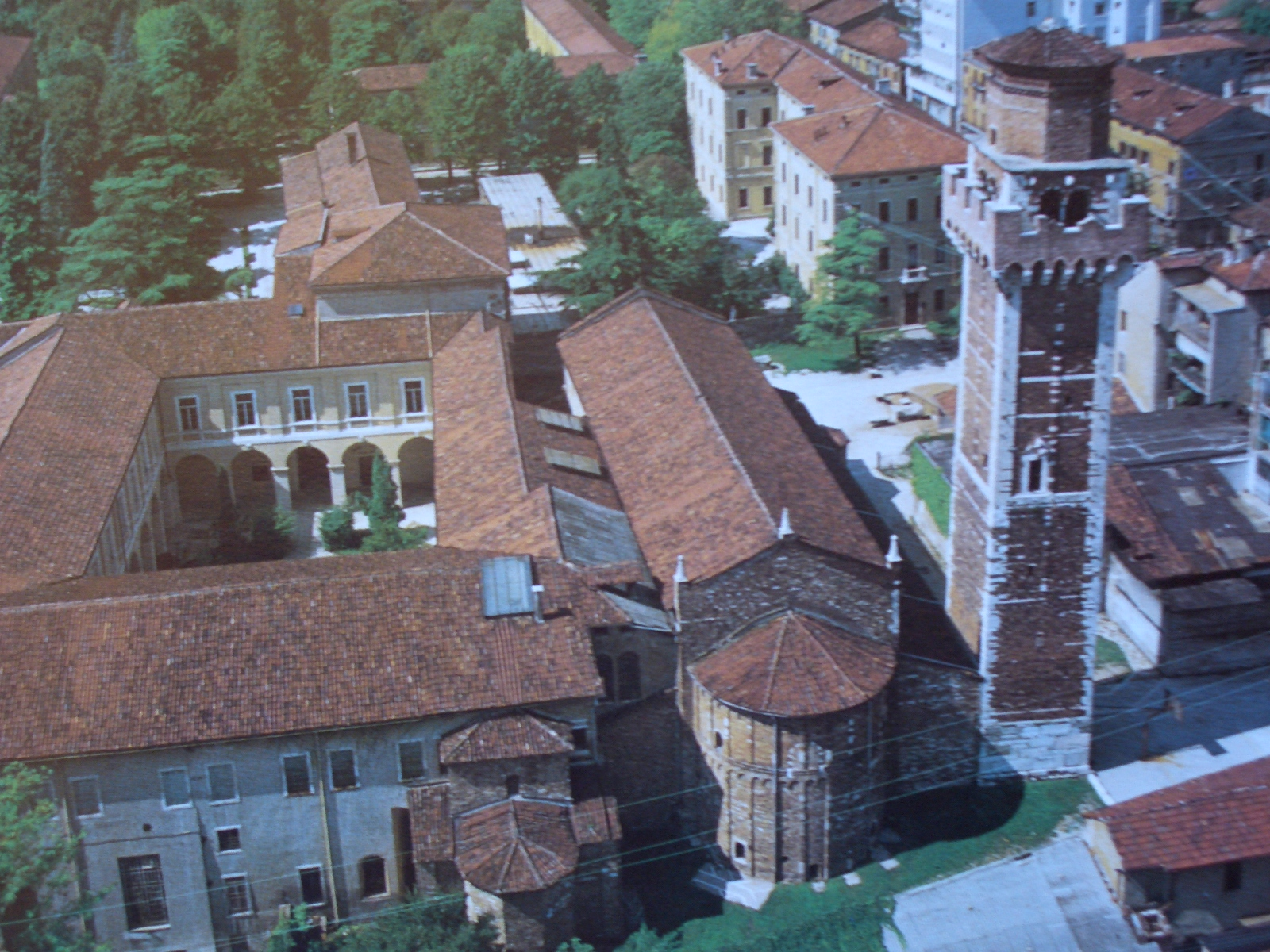
Aerial view of the former monastery (left), basilica (center) and bell tower (right)

During the 8th century, Benedictine monks settled in San Felice, building an abbey that became the core of this religious order's activity in Vicenza and which they dedicated to Saints Vitus and Modestus, patrons of their order. Charlemagne's visit to Italy included a stop at the monastery in Vicenza, to which he made a generous donation.

In the year 899, during one of their raids, the Hungarians destroyed part of the city and set fire to the abbey; the monks scattered to several places. It took a long time to rebuild, so much so that, when Bishop Rudolf was installed in Vicenza around 967, the buildings were still in ruins; this is what is stated by the chronicler Sigebert of Gembloux, who also recalls how Rudolf had to give to the bishop of Metz some precious relics of Saints Leontius and Carpophorus in order to obtain a donation from Emperor Otto I aimed at rebuilding the church and monastery.

A few years later, with one of the most important acts whose documentation has been preserved, the Privilegium of 983, Bishop Rudolf, a staunch supporter of the Cluniac Reforms, donated to the Benedictines of the Abbey—or rather partially returned, since these were goods already in their possession that had passed to the Bishop at the time of their expulsion by the Hungarians—a considerable amount of landed property, cum famulis et decimis, ranging from Ponte Alto to the mons famulorum i.e. Maddalene, from Brendola to Marostica. Together with the lands, he entrusted to the Benedictines the administration of the territory, the pastoral functions, and the reclamation of large swampy areas; it was the period of the encastellation and the monastery of San Felice also provided itself with a defensive tower.

The Benedictines of San Felice then founded numerous churches and small monasteries, also dependent on the mother abbey, generally placed along the ancient Roman roads leading out of the city. Traces of this remain in the toponymy and naming of numerous churches dedicated to Vitus, Modestus and Crescentia, the patron saints of this monastic order. The minor abbeys of San Pietro in Vivarolo and San Giorgio in Gogna depended on San Felice, along with a number of hospices, such as those of San Martino, San Bovo and San Nicolò in Borgo San Felice; however, it is very difficult to find exact references as there is almost no documentation left.

The Abbey of San Felice continued to receive numerous donations; of particular note is that of Bishop Jerome in 1013, who confirmed the privilegium of his predecessor Rudolf thirty years earlier; from this act it appears that the church and the monastery, recently rebuilt, were again half destroyed and abandoned, probably due to episodes of violence whose origin is unknown; like Rudolf, Jerome also wanted to restore religious life to San Felice, as a stronghold of the faith in the territory. A very similar act is the privilegium of Bishop Astulf in 1033, but its authenticity is doubtful. Bishop Liudigerio very much appreciated the two Benedictine monasteries of St. Felix and St. Peter: the Benedictine monasteries in that period of the early Middle Ages were the center of religious life, outside the city walls, much more than the diocesan churches.

Until the 12th century the monks, with the help of the famuli, worked directly on land reclamation. From this period on, they began to cede them to emancipated serfs or small feudal lords; at first this cession increased the early patrimony, but already in the 13th century the fragmentation of the lands led the abbey to an administrative crisis. The Benedictines – as happened to the bishops in the same period – fell into the hands of usurers and were forced to sell many important properties, including those of San Vito and Malo.

Such a vast patrimony was not easy to manage; the monks soon found themselves defending it against usurpation by small feudal lords. At the time of the investiture struggle between the emperors Henry IV, then Henry V, and the popes, the abbots of the monastery of St. Felix were on the side of the emperor and gained additional benefits. But even after the fortunes turned in favor of the Pope, donations and privileges continued to be granted to the abbey, which remained the heart of Vicenza's religious life until the middle of the 13th century.

After the creation of urban and suburban parishes in the thirteenth century, the Abbot was also responsible for the religious life of the population of the village of San Felice, whose parish seat for centuries was the small church of the former hospice of San Martino; in the basilica, however, there was also the baptismal font, which remained there until the Napoleonic reform.

In addition to the pastoral function exercised by the monks in the rural centers that sprang up after the land reclamation and far from the parishes, it is probable that in the Abbey of San Felice there was also a monastic school, both for the monks and for the laity, oriented toward ecclesiastical theological teaching.

=== Decadence of the abbey ===
A general decline of the Benedictine Order began in the 13th century, in spite of the attempts of the popes and bishops of Vicenza to restore the monasteries to their original fervor. The abbots of San Felice were involved in the struggles of the lordships for power: Abbot Gumberto, for example, played an important role in supporting the lords during the period of the Paduan Custody (1265–1311), opposing the Bishop of Vicenza.

All this did not contribute to the prosperity of the monastery. Bishop Altegrado attempted a reform in 1307, which is recorded in a document in which the bishop stigmatized the irregularities and abuses of the monks and the abbot. However, there is no documentation to tell us if there was an improvement in the life of the monastery as a result of the bishop's criticism, but conditions soon deteriorated again.

Under the Scaligeri – who had confiscated all the property of the local Church, including the rich patrimony of the monastery – the monks and servants lacked even food and clothing, so much so that Abbot Bernard complained that he could not maintain a good standard of religious life or even ensure the divine office. Even after 1376, when the property was returned, the monastery's economic situation remained difficult, contributing to its general decline.

In the course of the century, the ancient devotion to the main patron saints of the city – the martyrs Felix and Fortunatus – also waned, and around 1400 they were permanently replaced by St. Vincent, and in the second half of the 15th century even by the saints Leontius and Carpophorus.

=== The buildings in the Middle Ages ===
The basilica, rebuilt in 983, remained basilical in plan – with three naves separated by two rows of pillars leading from the entrance wall to the shoulder of the apse – and there are no traces of a crypt, as was common in the churches of the time.

Both the bell tower and the church were severely damaged by the violent earthquake of January 3, 1117, which struck all of northern Italy: reconstruction began immediately under the direction of Abbot Albert, who is commemorated in a marble fragment kept in the Parish Museum. During these works, the semicircular crypt was added, according to the style of the time, and the church acquired the appearance and pre-Romanesque features that still characterize it. Except for the lower part of the apse, the present basilica dates back to the first half of the 12th century.

Towards the end of the 12th century, Bishop Cacciafronte, who was particularly devoted to the patron saints of the city, had the ancient Roman road – a section of the Via Postumia – that led from the Cathedral to the Basilica repaired at his own expense, since the cobblestones had worn away over time and made the passage very uncomfortable.

Little is known about the period from the 13th to the 15th century. What is known is that around 1250 Abbot Pellegrino began the construction of a new cloister and that between the end of the fourteenth century and the first half of the fifteenth century, a period during which the number of monks increased considerably, the entire monastery was restored and the cloister was completed. These events are recalled by some inscriptions, since almost nothing remains of the fourteenth-century constructions, except for two biforas in the western wall of the current sacristy, which were destroyed during the seventeenth-century remodeling.

== Modern era ==
=== 15th and first half of the 16th century ===
The new religious policy of the Republic of Venice led to the restoration of the ecclesiastical patrimony, which had been disturbed and largely dispersed during the rule of the Scaliger and Visconti families in the 14th century. The real estate still held by the Benedictine monasteries of San Felice and San Pietro was reorganized and greatly improved, although it was much reduced compared to the times when they owned vast estates scattered all over the place.

At the beginning of the fifteenth century, however, St. Felix Abbey was in a state of almost total abandonment. In order to maintain it in a decent state during those times of general upheaval in the Church, it was given in commendam to foreign abbots, who were assisted in this task by only two or three monks; around 1430 these were mostly Germans. During the fifteenth century, the other small monasteries in the village of Porta Nova, which had been dependent on San Felice, were transferred to new religious congregations.

In 1463, a papal decree approved by the Doge, probably in an attempt to reform the monastery, annexed it to the Congregation of Santa Giustina of Padua, which had already been reformed on the initiative of its abbot, Ludovico Barbo. Immediately after this union, the monastery, from then on called the Order of St. Benedict of the Observance, underwent a profound change for the better: new rules were established, including the annual renewal of the abbot's appointment, a different modality for the care of souls in the parishes within the monastery's jurisdiction, and a more scrupulous management of the patrimony. In less than ten years, the number of monks increased to sixteen, coming from different parts of Europe, despite being located in an insalubrious place near the stagnant waters of the river Retrone.

However, this did not last long: already in the first half of the sixteenth century there was a new relaxation of the customs and the monastery did not produce anything really worthy, although the number of monks remained constant. Around 1532, there was even talk of demolishing it together with the church to make way for the new defensive system proposed by Bartolomeo d'Alviano.

=== From the second half of the 16th century to the end of the 18th century ===
The reform wave of the Council of Trent, which Bishop Matteo Priuli also tried to bring to the city, was not immediately accepted by the abbots of the ancient monasteries, especially that of San Felice, who opposed the decrees, considering them detrimental to the apostolic privileges and exemptions they had acquired. In the second half of the sixteenth century, San Felice had a patrimony with the highest income among all the monasteries of Vicenza, despite the fact that over time it had had to sell many of its assets, lands and even relics, even going so far as to propose to its creditors and moneylenders the celebration of Masses of suffrage, quantified until the debts were paid.

The spiritual and economic decline continued throughout the seventeenth and eighteenth centuries, and the monastery never had more than a dozen monks. The buildings were temporarily used as a shelter for plague victims during the epidemic of 1630, and were partially restored in the first half of the century.

In the second half of the seventeenth century, the basilica also underwent a series of radical interventions aimed at transforming it according to the new aesthetic canons. Shortly after 1660, in front of the simple three-part Romanesque façade of the church, work began on the construction of a grandiose two-order façade, at the base of which there was a large atrium with a three-arched Baroque portico; the portico and the decorations were crowned by balustrades with statues. In this way, the exterior was modified: the lateral naves, which were lower than the central one, were no longer visible, and the organic link between the church and the bell tower was lost.

The interior was also completely renovated and some altars were moved. The ceiling was richly coffered, the choir was clearly separated from the area for the faithful by a balcony, and the walls were plastered and frescoed: of great value are the frescoes painted by Giulio Carpioni between 1662 and 1665 in the apse basin, on the theme of the Coronation of the Virgin by the Holy Spirit.

In the first half of the 18th century, however, the monastery, which by then had been battered by time, lack of maintenance and the earthquake of 1695, was completely restored and partially rebuilt during the period when Dom Floriano Serta of Vicenza was abbot.

The monks of San Felice continued to run the parish of the village, for whose pastoral care they maintained a parish priest, who could be a religious or even a secular priest; gradually, as the number of inhabitants also increased, the parish became emancipated from the monastery, which offered a limited service, for example at night, and was therefore subject to frequent complaints.

The Benedictines also exercised protection – sometimes controversial – over the monastery of St. Peter, just as the other male monasteries exercised it over the female monasteries and convents.

Its demise came with the fall of the Venetian Republic; spared from occupation during the first arrival of the French in 1797, the complex became the property of the city after the suppression of the religious orders in 1806, but by then the dispersal and alienation of property, including some of the real estate, had begun, and the few remaining monks left for Padua. In 1808, Arnaldo Tornieri noted in his chronicle that the monastery of San Felice had become a "stinking and fetid barracks".

=== Excavations, discoveries and restorations ===
The Baroque additions, which had nothing to do with the simple style of the church, were preserved until 1936–1937, when the then parish priest, Msgr. Lorenzon, with the help of the Superintendency of Monuments, decided to remove them in order to restore the original forms, eliminating the Baroque and Renaissance superstructures.

== Description ==
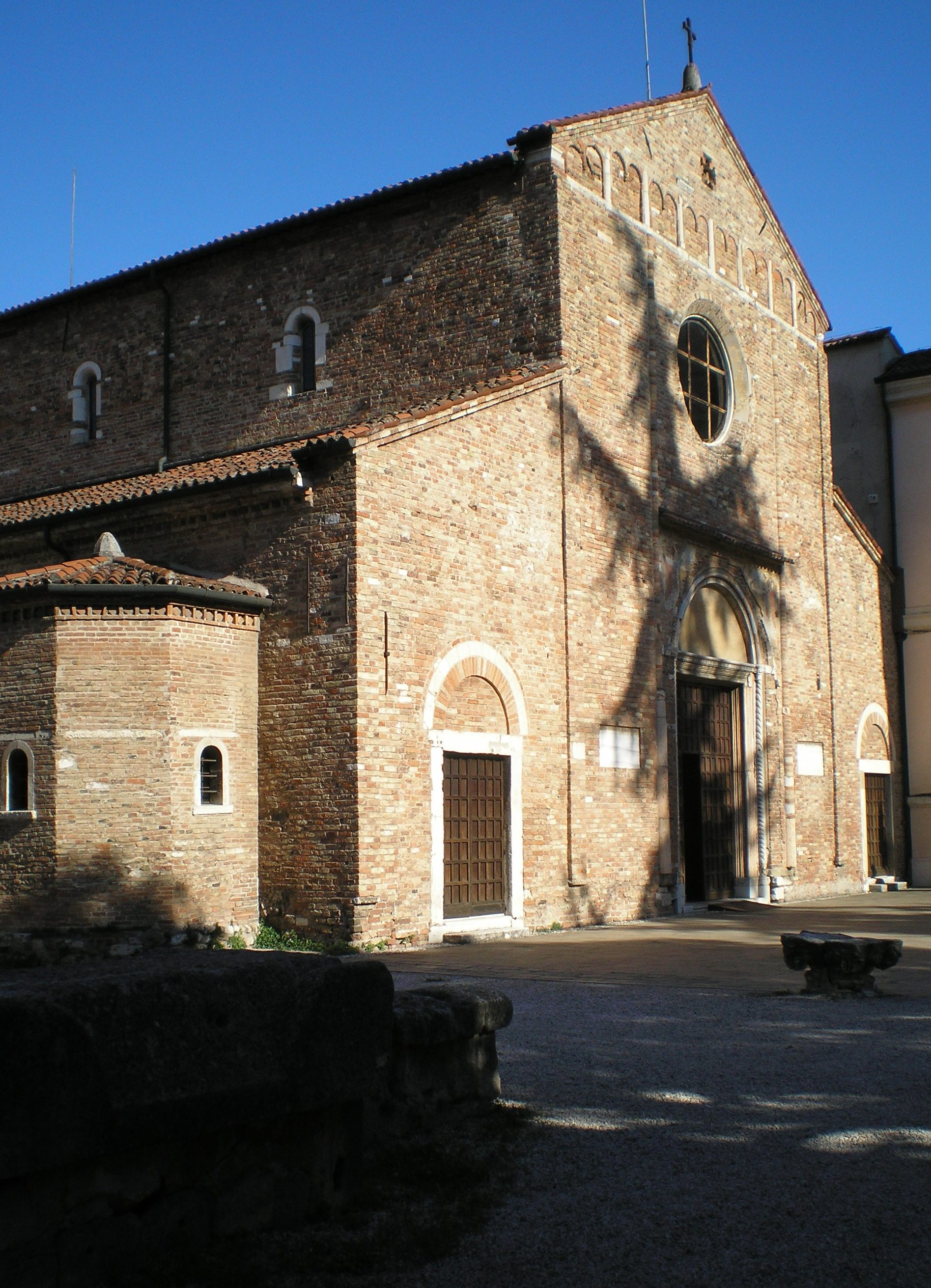
Façade of the basilica.

=== Basilica ===
==== Façade ====
The tiered façade, which anticipates the tripartite division of the interior, whose construction dates back to the 12th century, is in exposed brick, harmoniously divided into three parts by flat pilasters, with the central part further divided by two pilasters of semicircular section.

Of the portals, the left one is original and the right one is a modern imitation; the central one, framed in red and white marble, is architraved and vaulted. Slightly splayed, it is flanked by small twisted columns connected to the architrave by two small capitals; on the architrave is the date 1154, a metric inscription and the name of the maker, Pietro Veneto. The lunette is framed by a frieze in niello that reveals refined Byzantine elements filtered into the Venetian environment; on the sides, two sections of an arch, a remnant of the larger 10th-century portal of the church: around it, fragments of a fresco (the Resurrection of the Dead, first half of the 11th century) of Ottonian origin with Byzantine contributions (in these frescoes the dead are called by angels to the sound of trumpets).

On either side of the entrance, two plaques in Latin document interventions to the church in 1425 and "in meliorem formam" in 1674; in addition, a small medieval epigraphic inscription in Old French (attributed to the 13th century) is placed on the left side of the façade.

Above the portal, a large oculus recalls parallel examples of the 11th century in Verona, Lombardy and the Po Valley. The upper part of the façade is softened by a loggia in bas-relief, divided by pilasters with stone columns and pairs of small arches, the workmanship of which, similar to that of the bell tower, testifies to its construction in the 12th century.

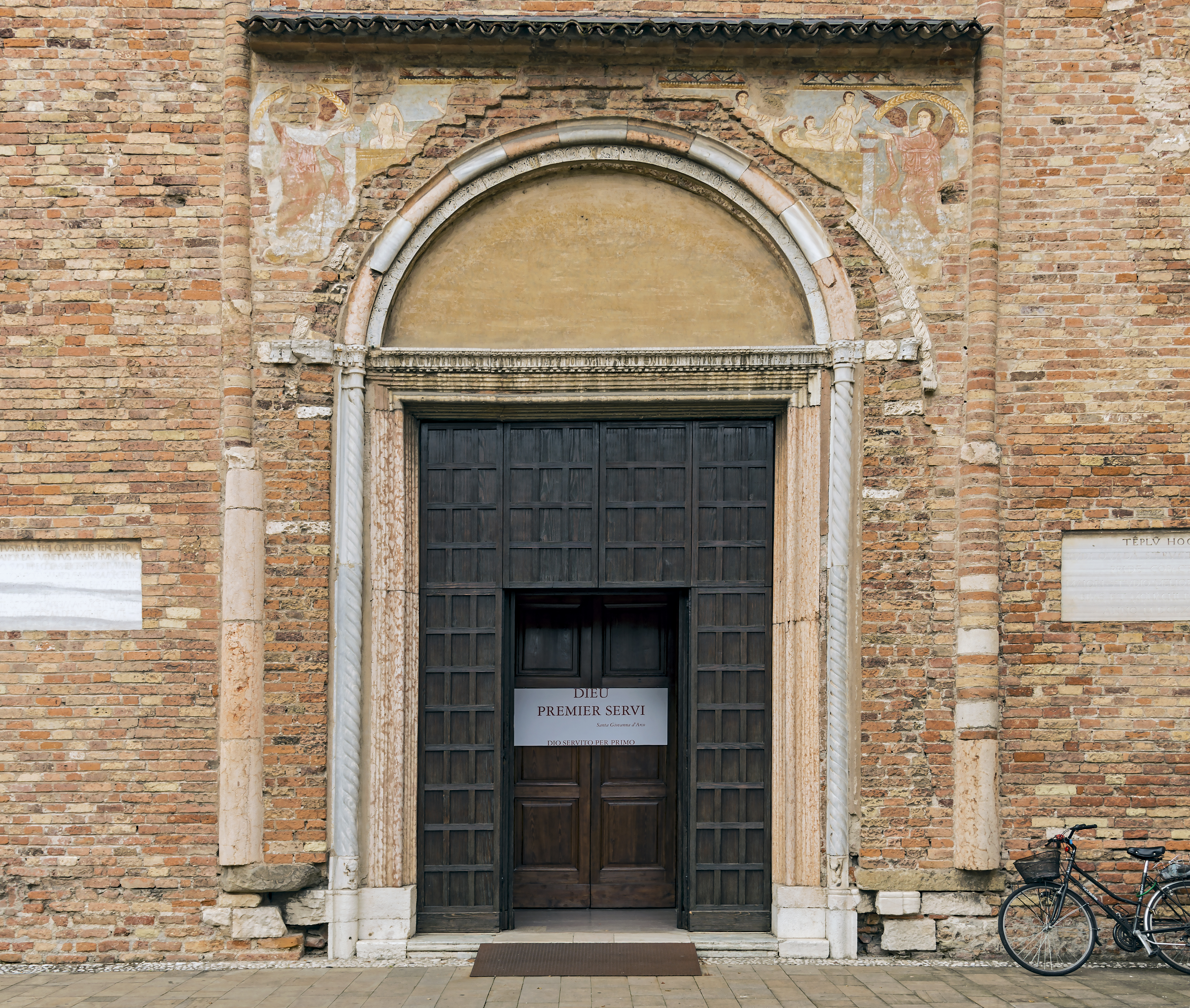
Entrance portal

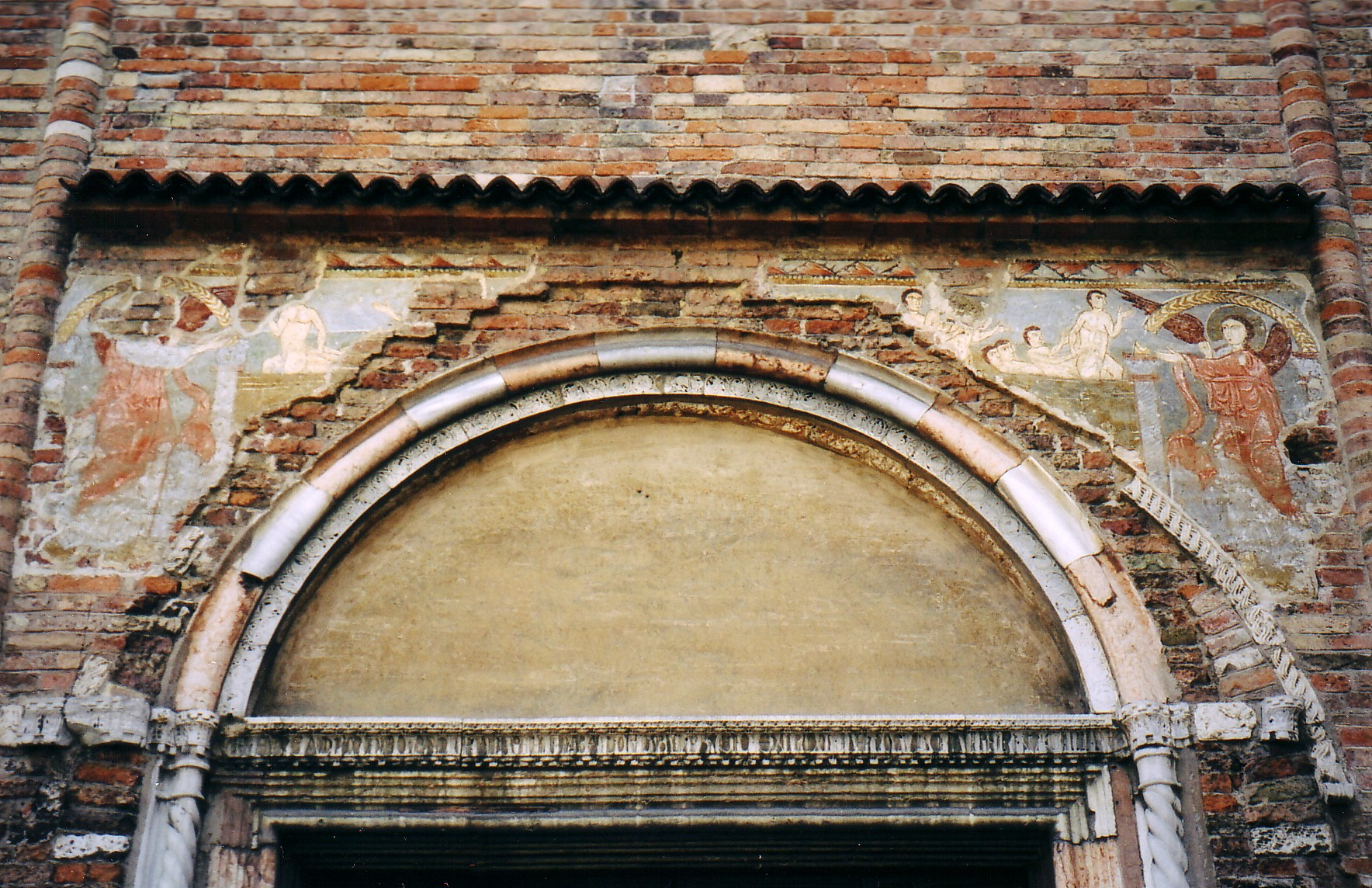
Early medieval frescoes on the entrance portal

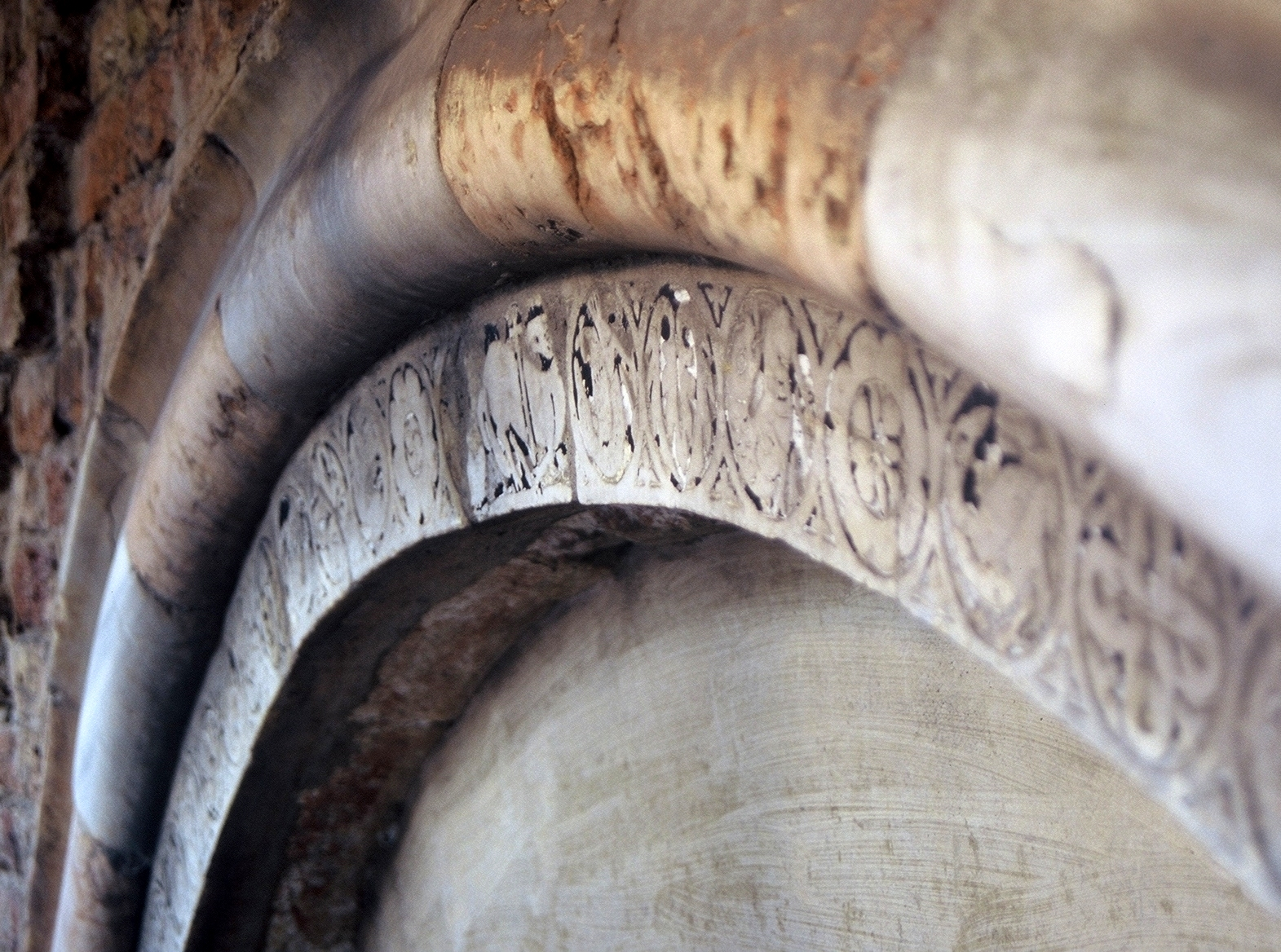
Portal arch

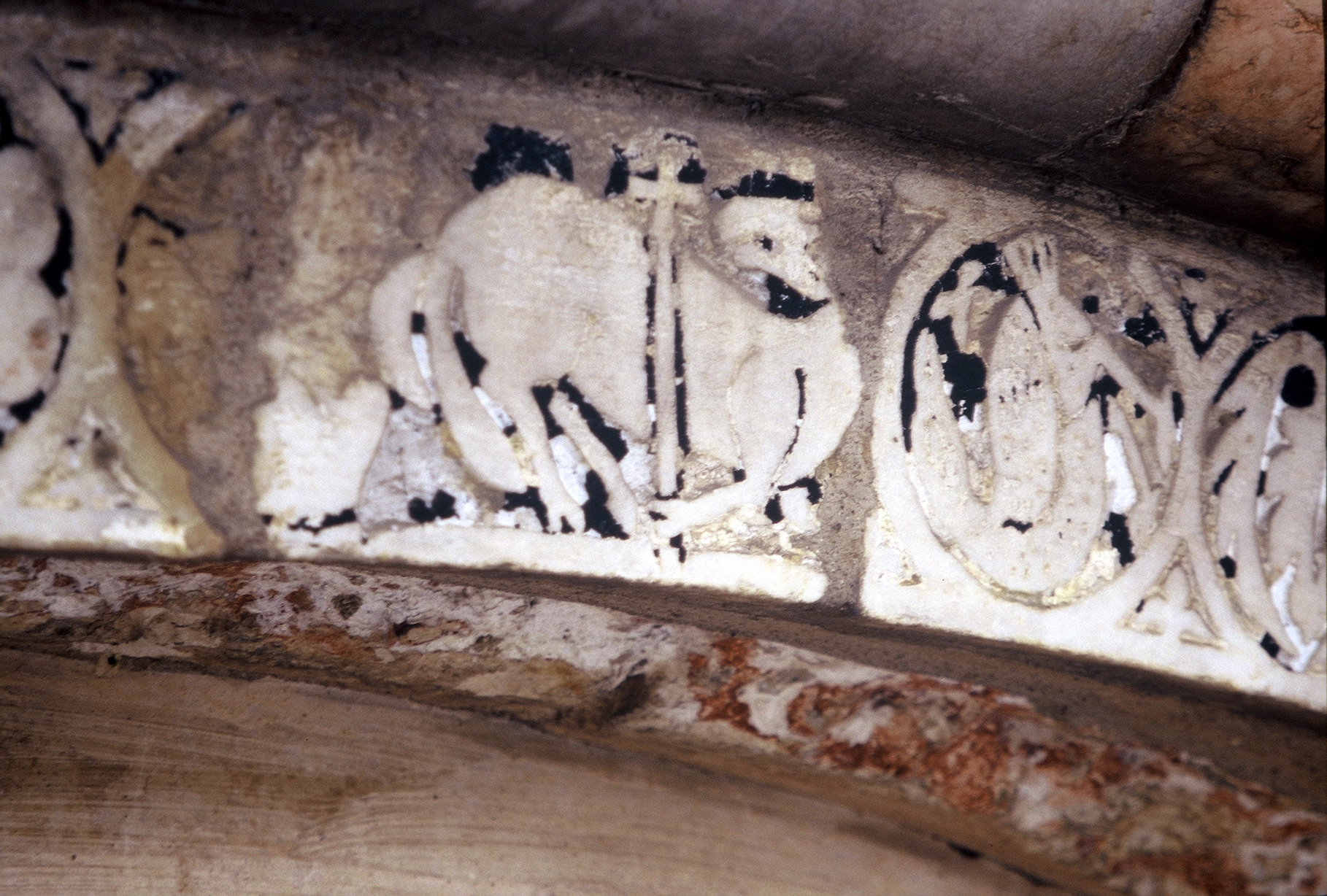
Detail of the niello frieze

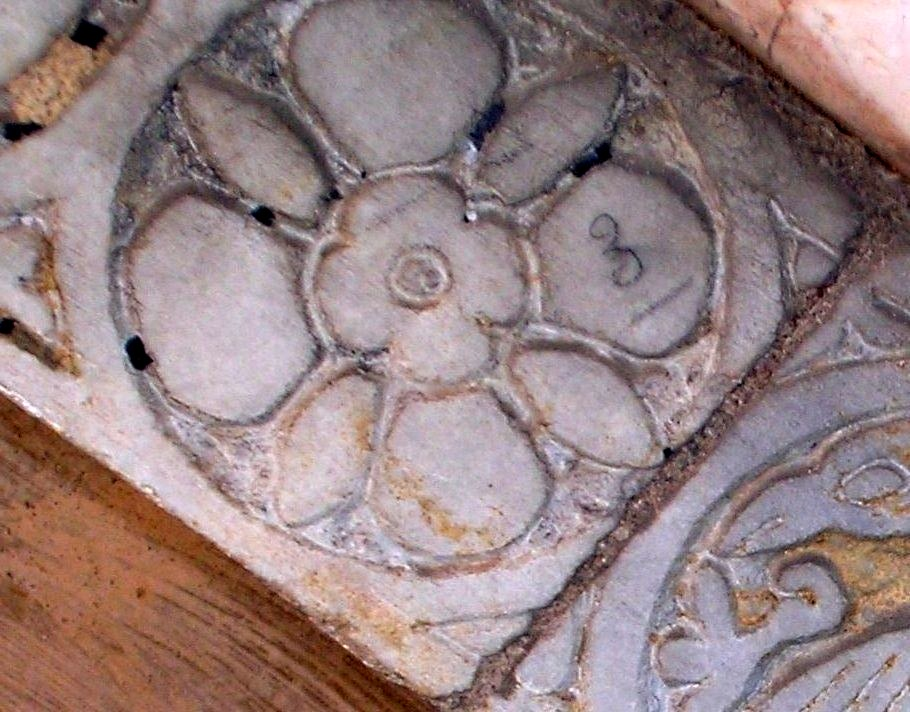
Detail of the cornice

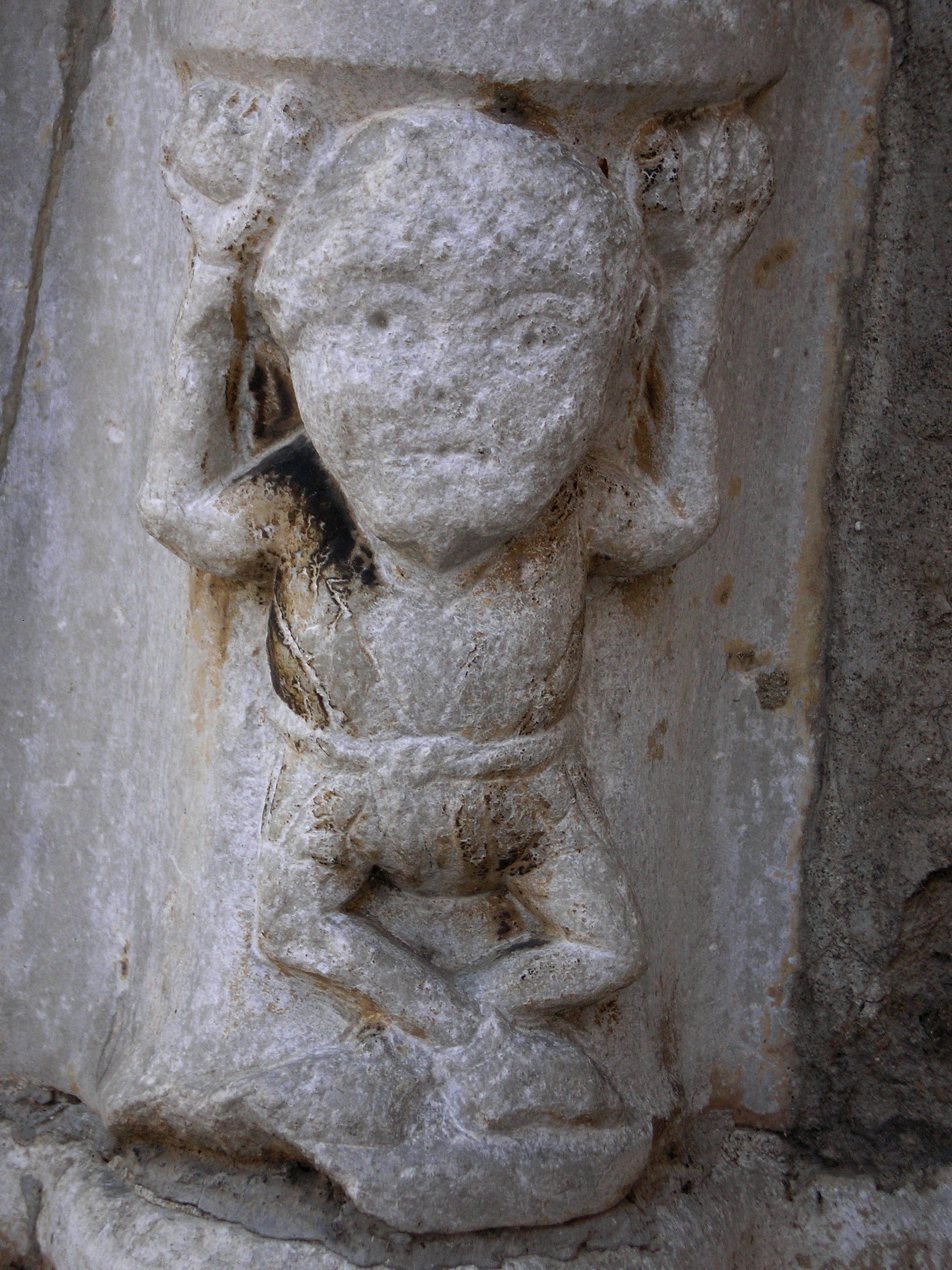
Telamon of the portal

==== Apse ====
The semicircular apse of the nave is one of the most remarkable parts of the basilica, because it documents the different periods of construction on two levels. The lower level, with rougher and more irregular masonry, dates back to the first construction ordered by Bishop Rudolf; the upper level belongs to the 12th century reconstruction and is characterized by the division with pilasters and coupled arches, typical of that period, which were later added to the first level by superimposition.

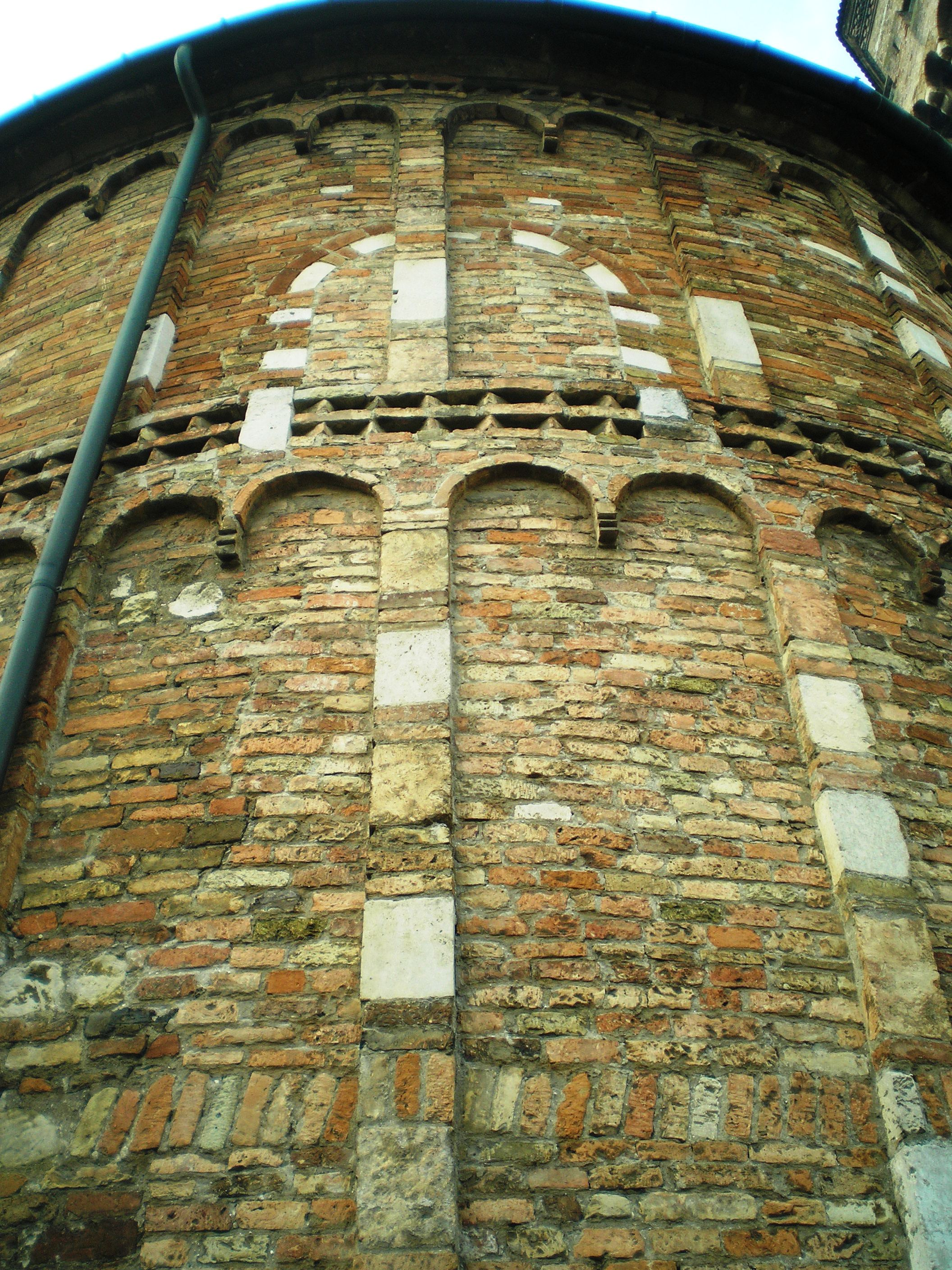
Back of the apse

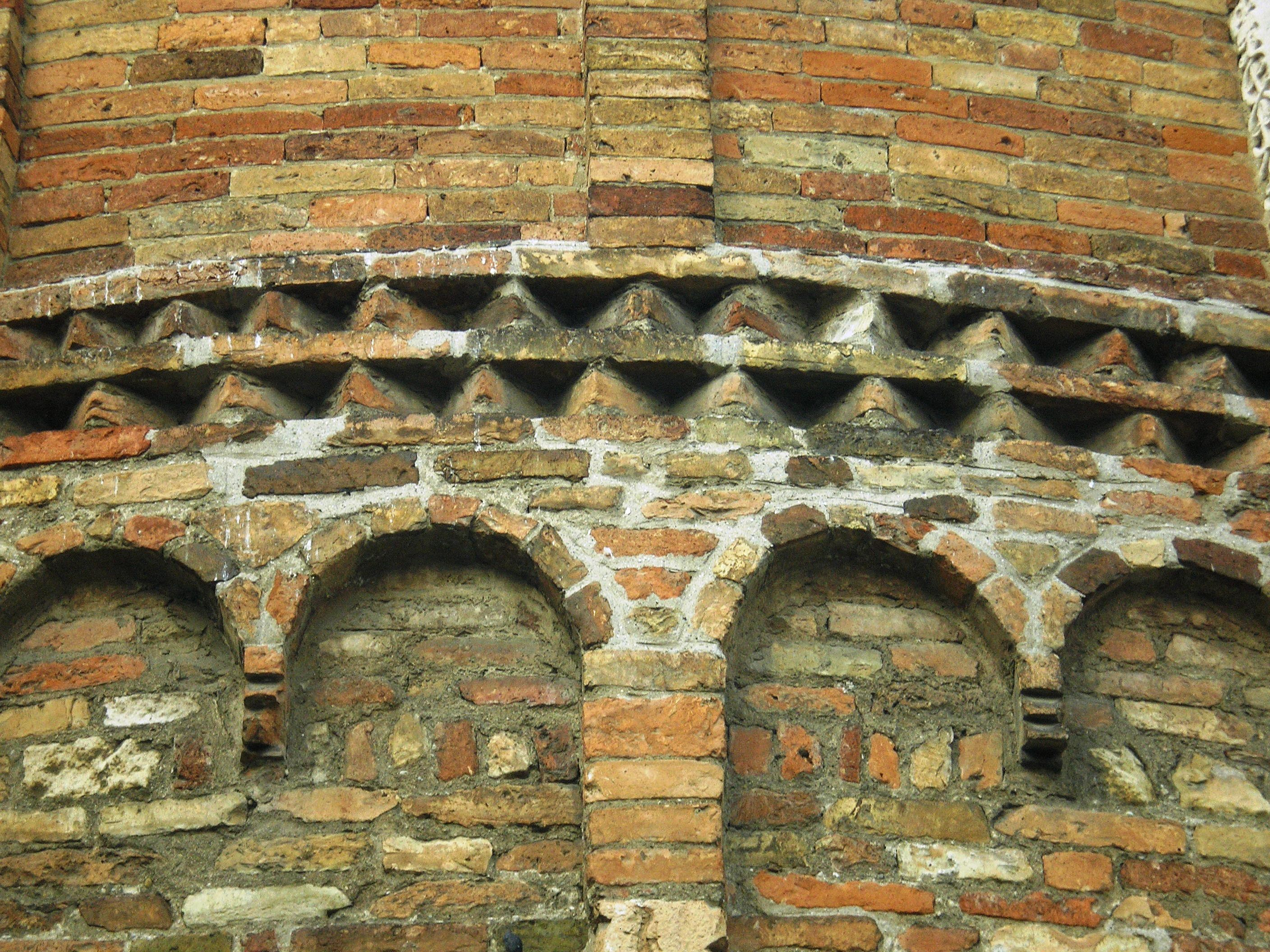
Detail of the apse

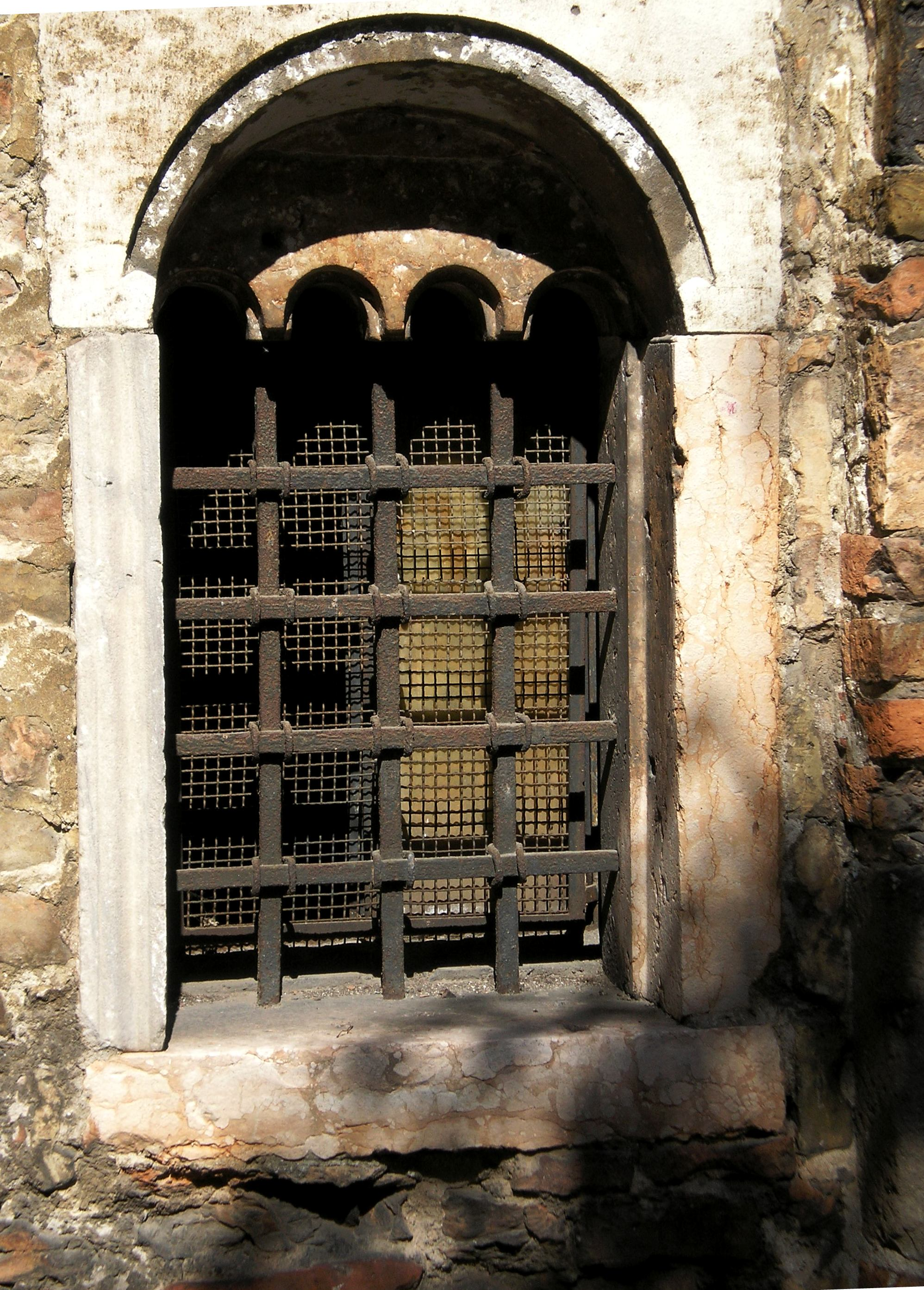
Window of the crypt

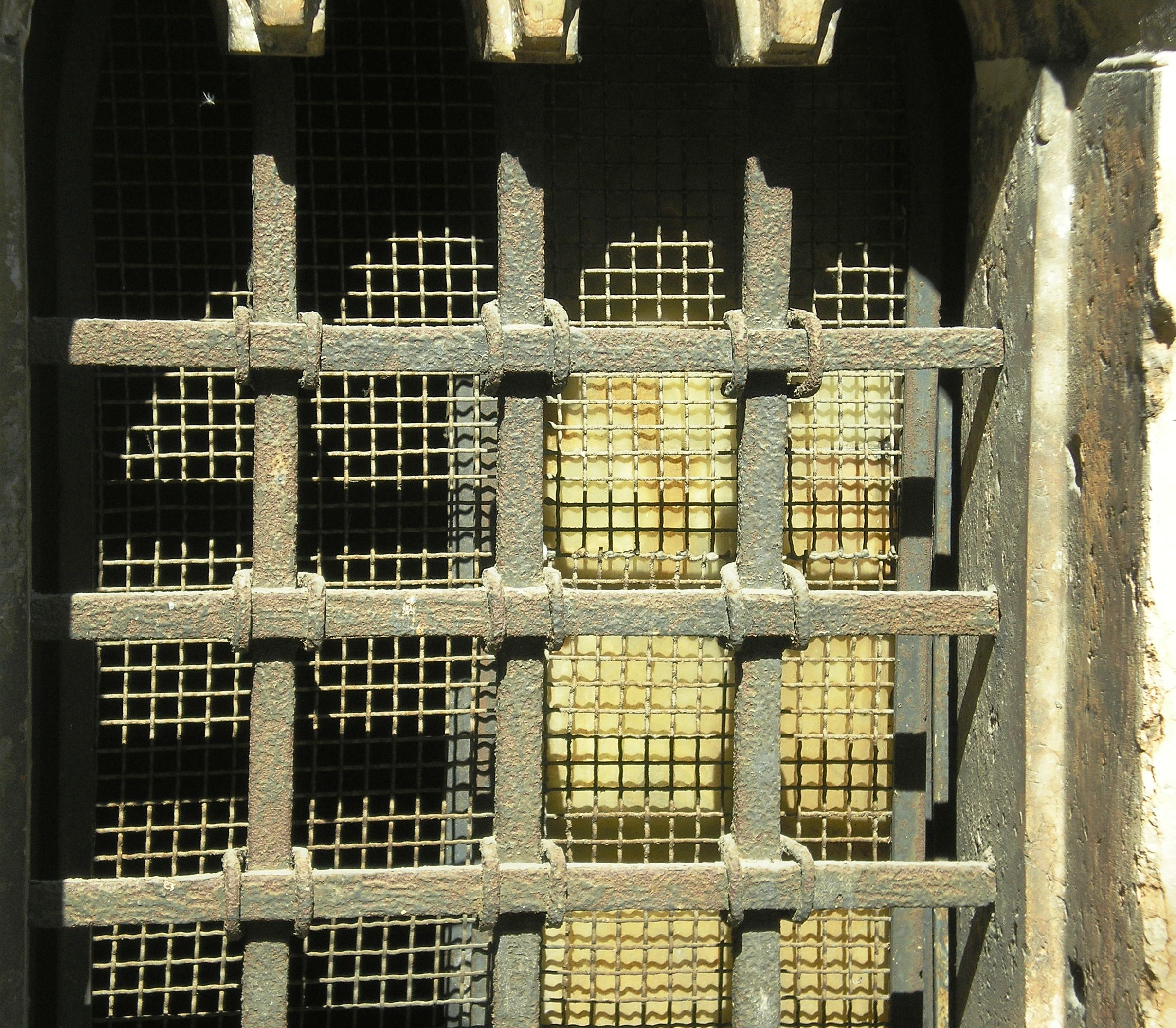
Detail of the grating

==== Interior ====
The austere interior has three naves divided by nine arches alternately supported by columns and pillars: light enters through the oculus of the façade and the small side windows, creating shadow effects between the naves. The decoration is almost absent: a few side altars and the remains of a mosaic in the center remain. It is not easy to distinguish how much of the appearance is due to the original basilica and how much to the restorations of the 1930s, in which ancient materials were used as much as possible.

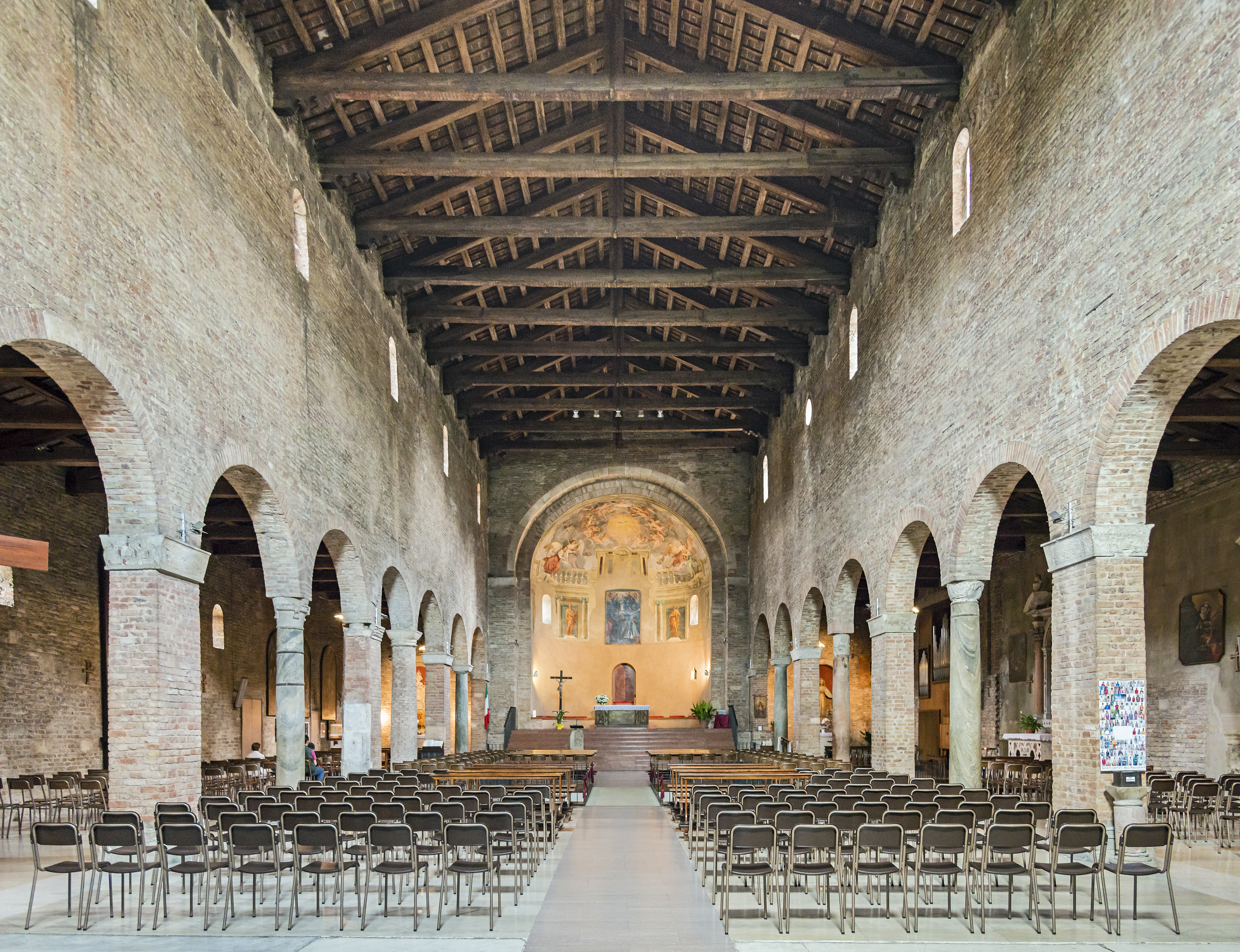
View of the nave of the basilica

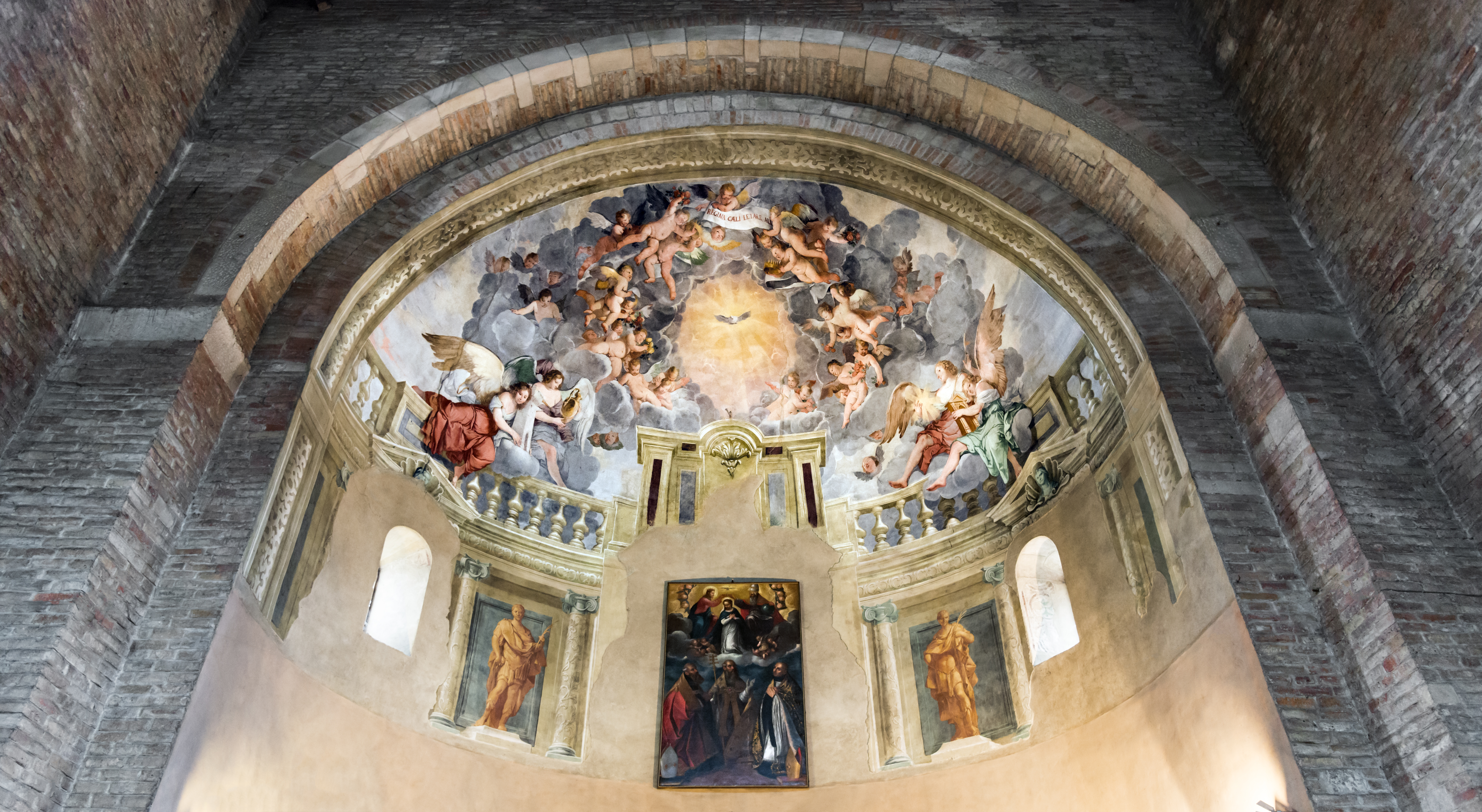
Decoration of the chancel

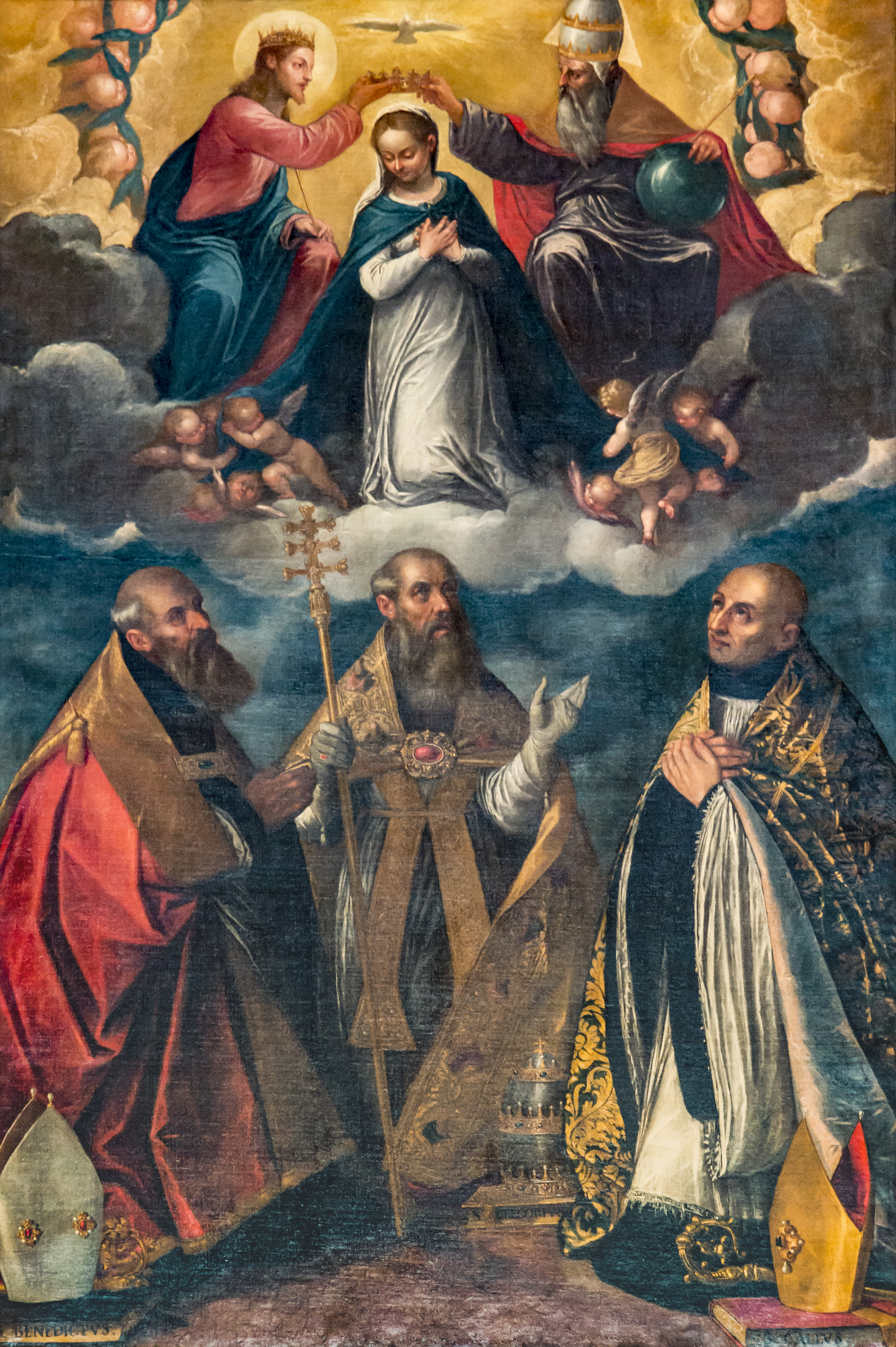
Coronation of the Virgin by Pietro Damini

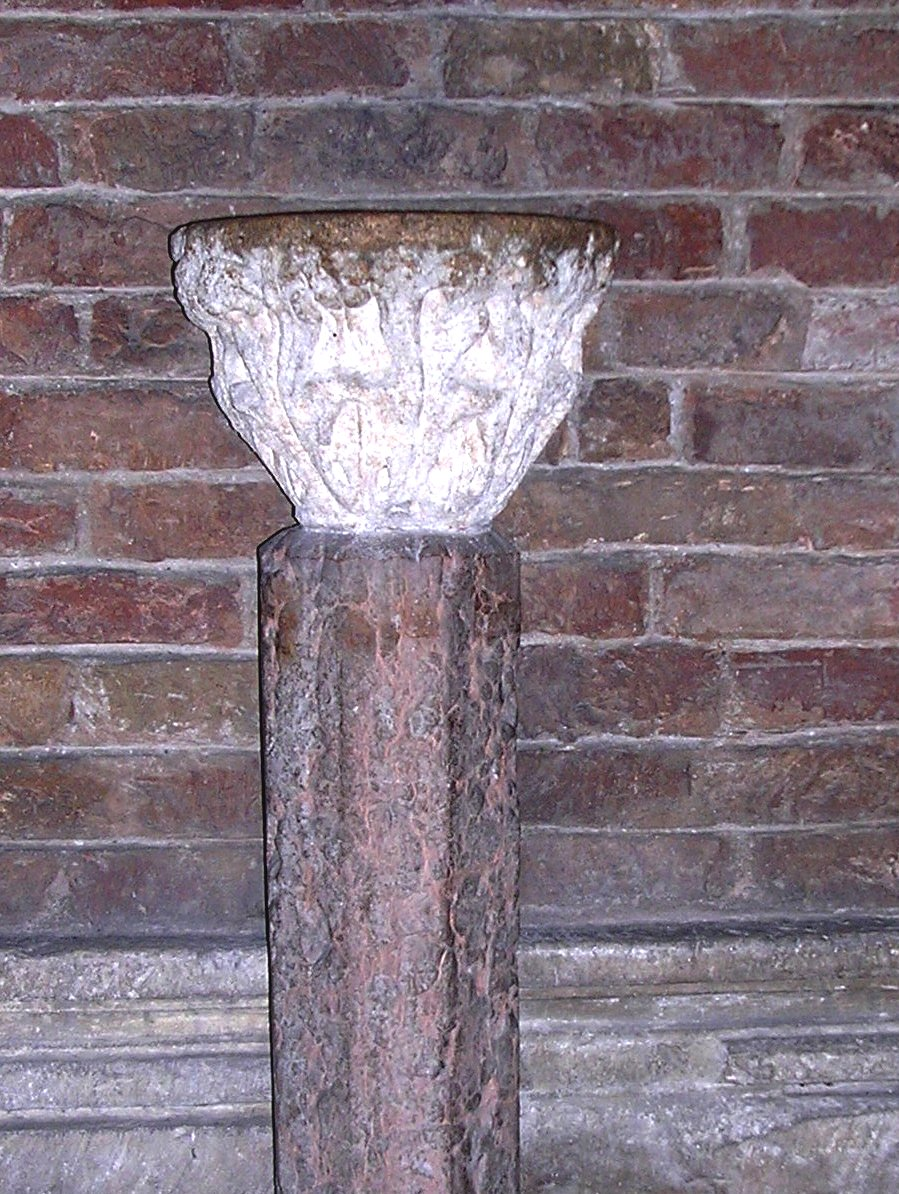
Stoup

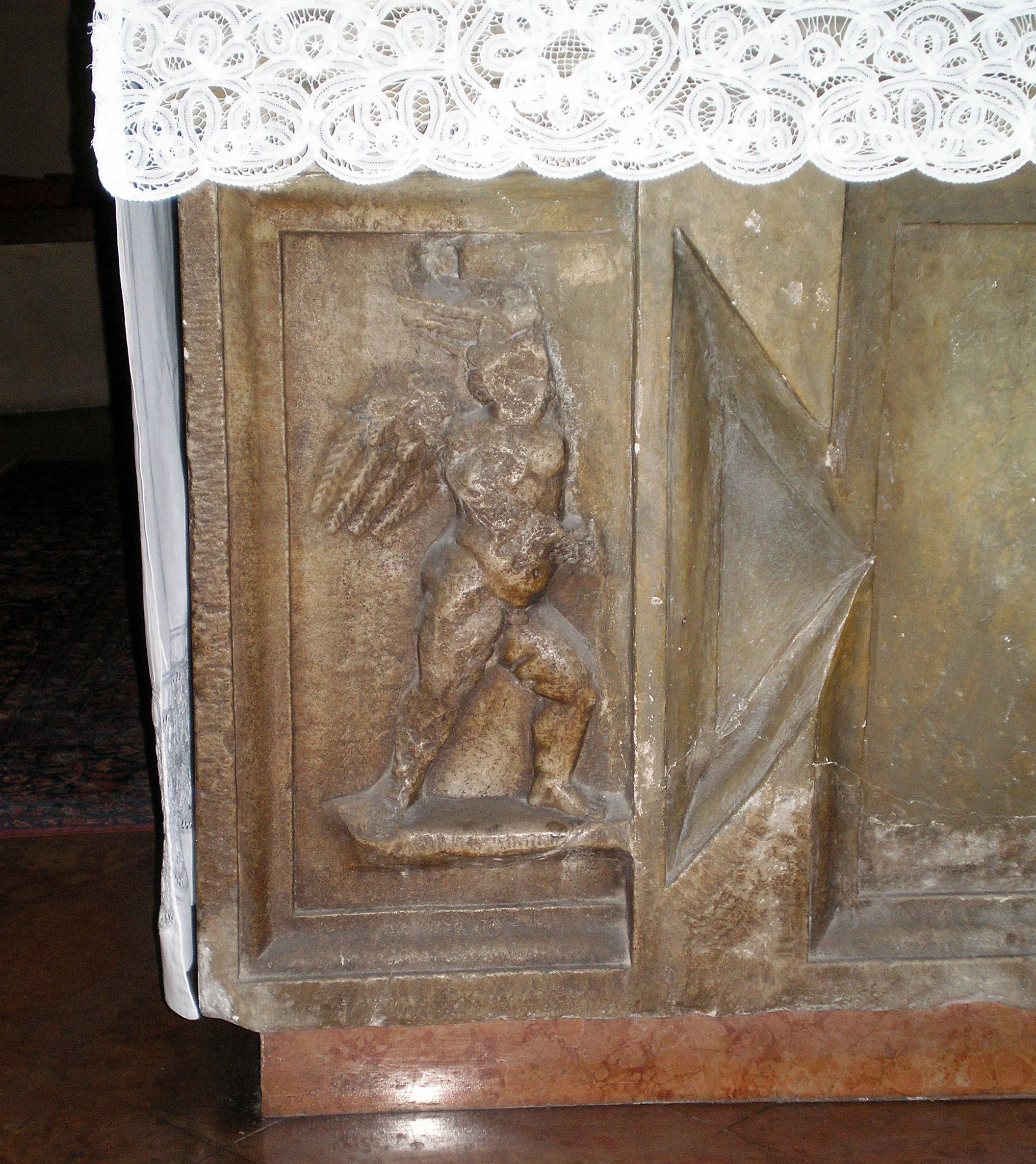
High altar

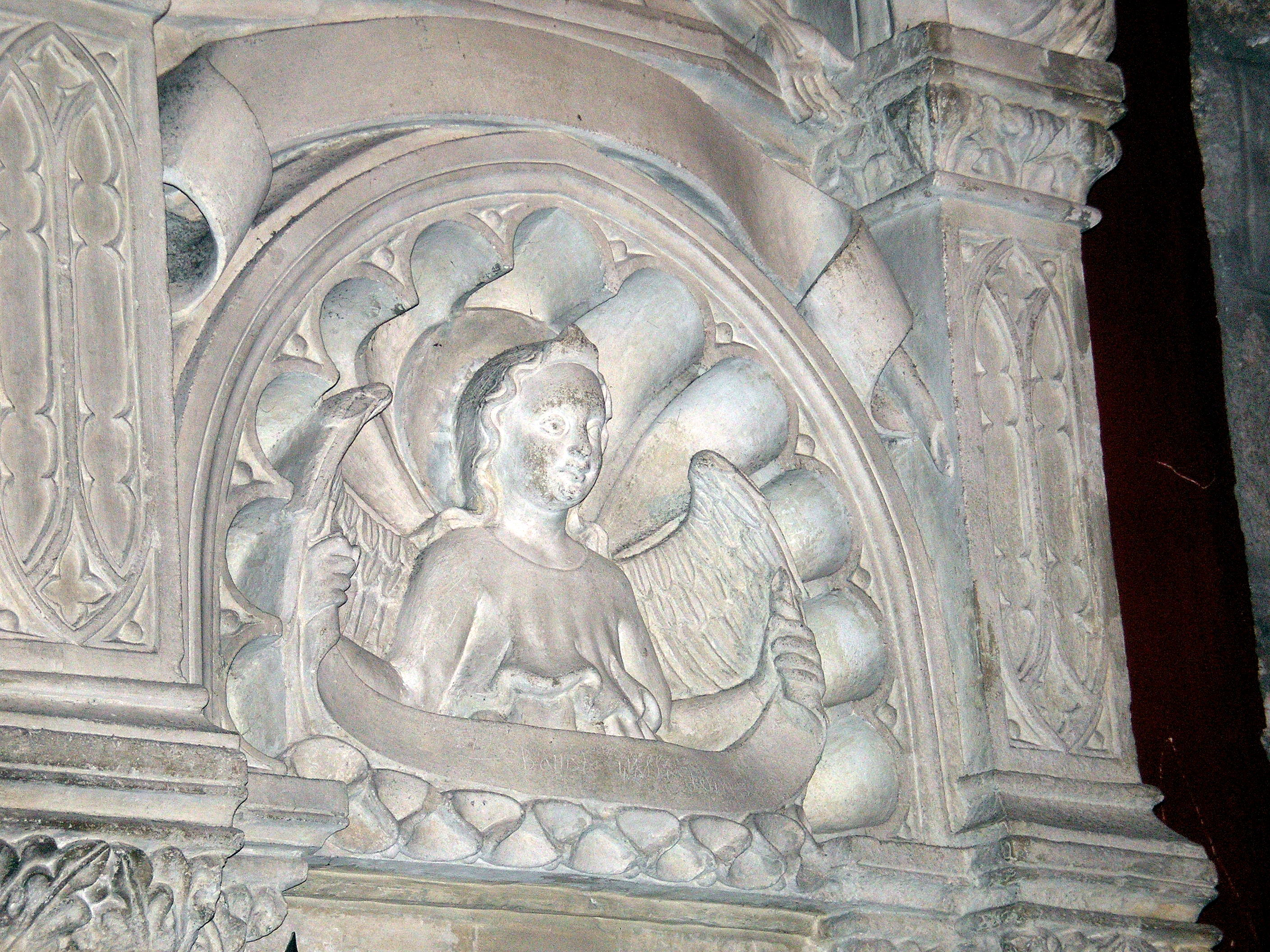
Altar of the Most Holy

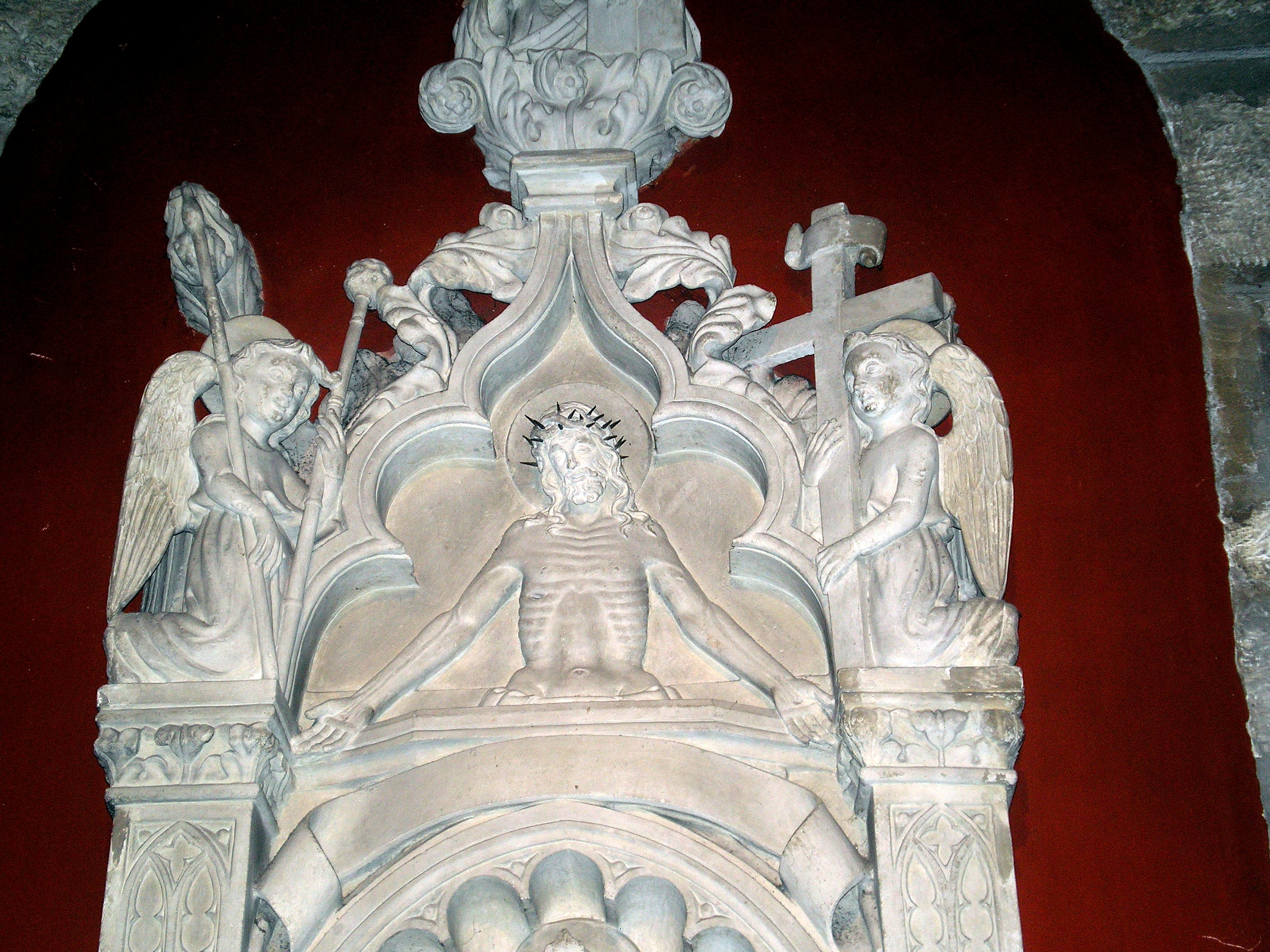
Altar of the Most Holy

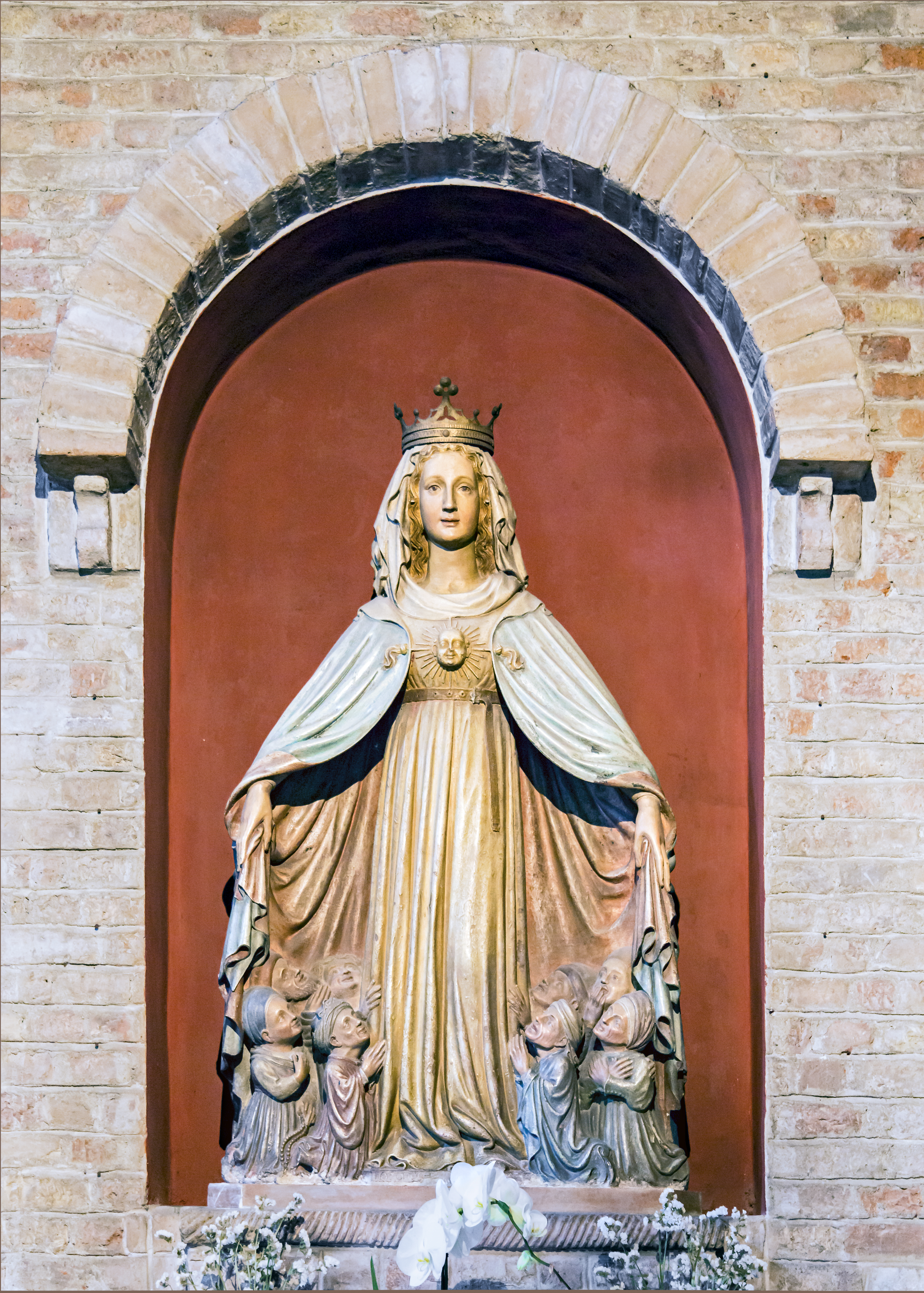
Altar of Our Lady

The crypt – built “ad oratorio” with three naves with rib vaults, accessed by two staircases on either side of the front – can be dated with certainty to the second half of the 12th century. In the thickness of the wall are three niches, in which there are splayed monoforas.

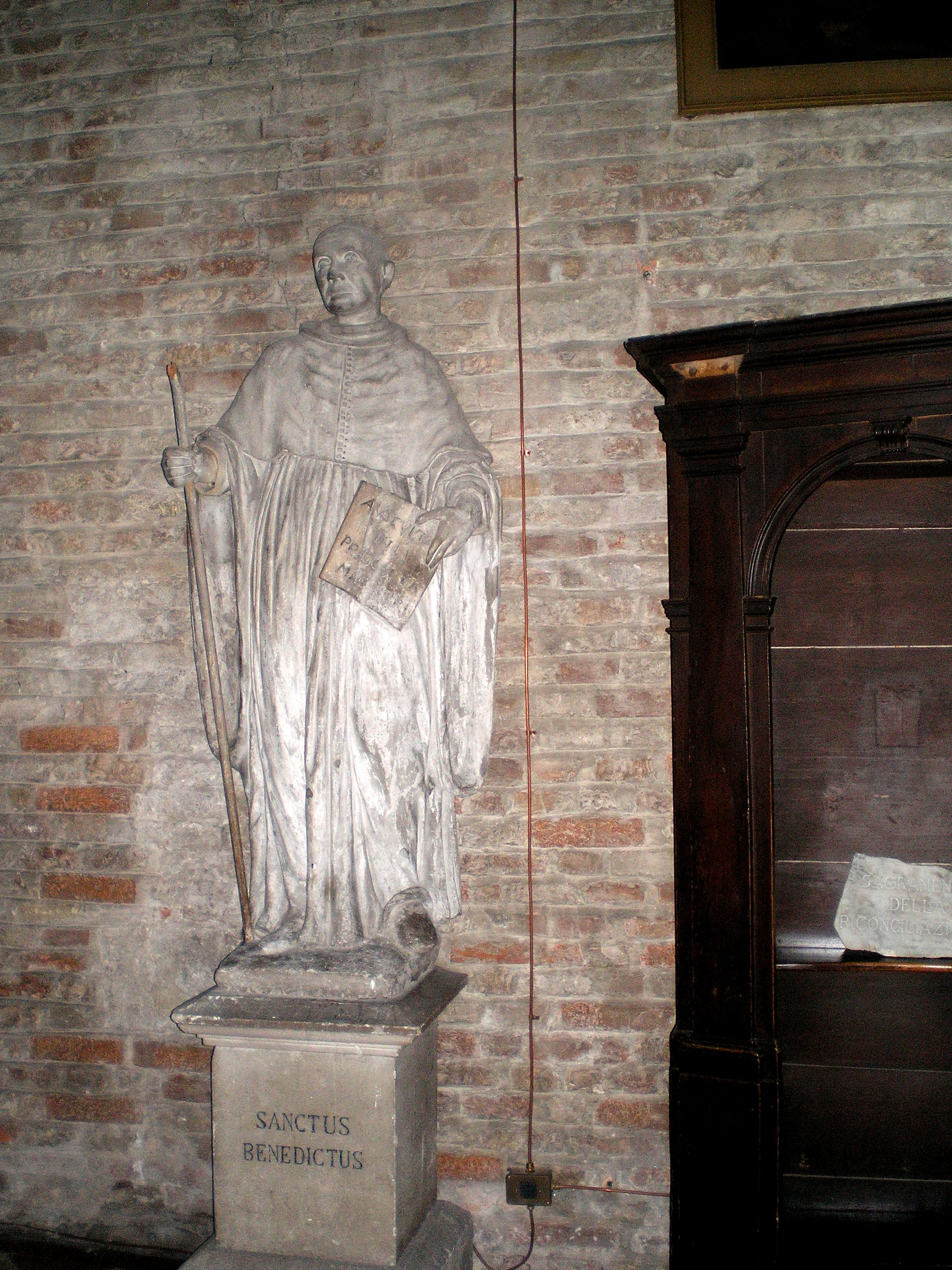
Statue of St. Benedict

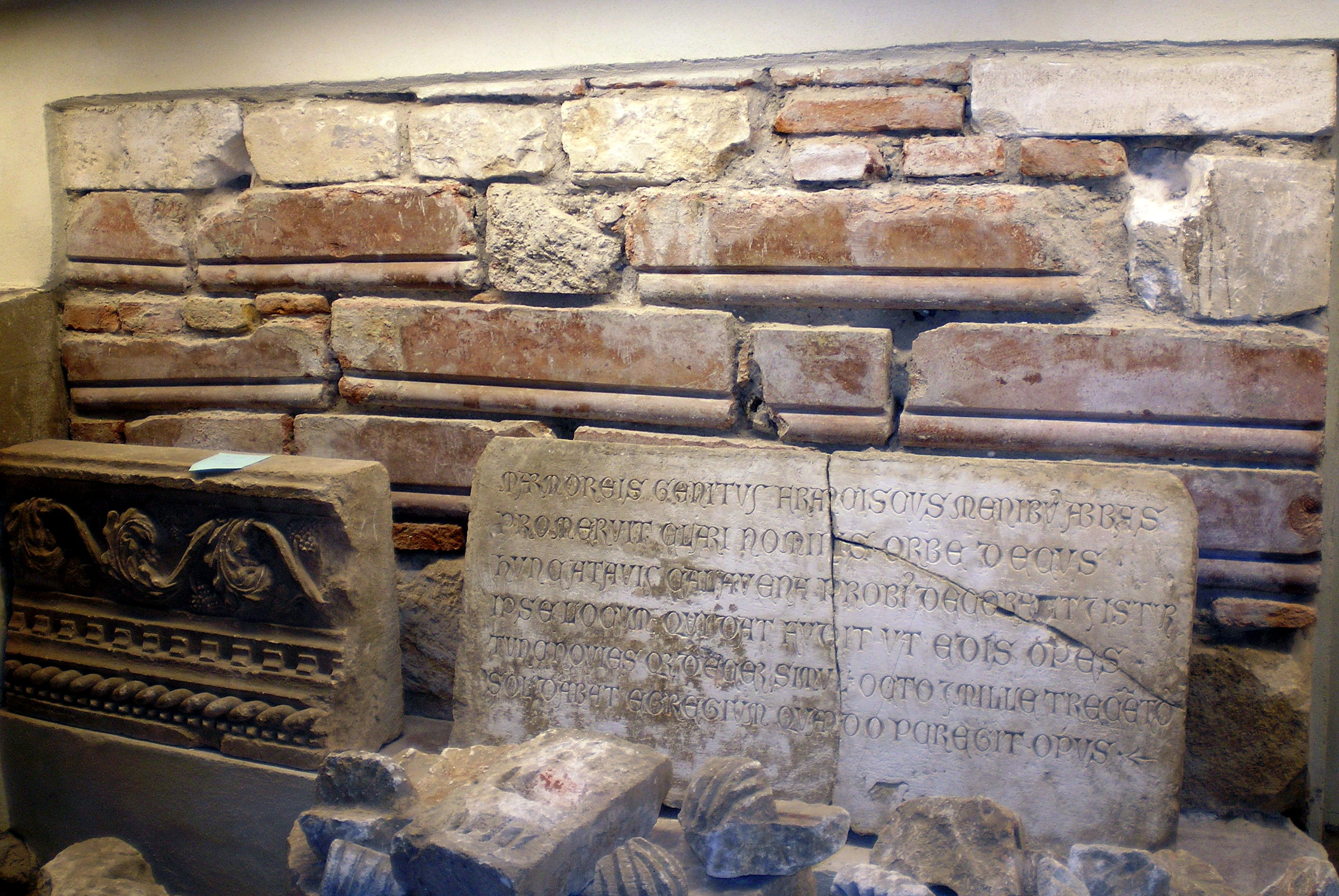
Crypt

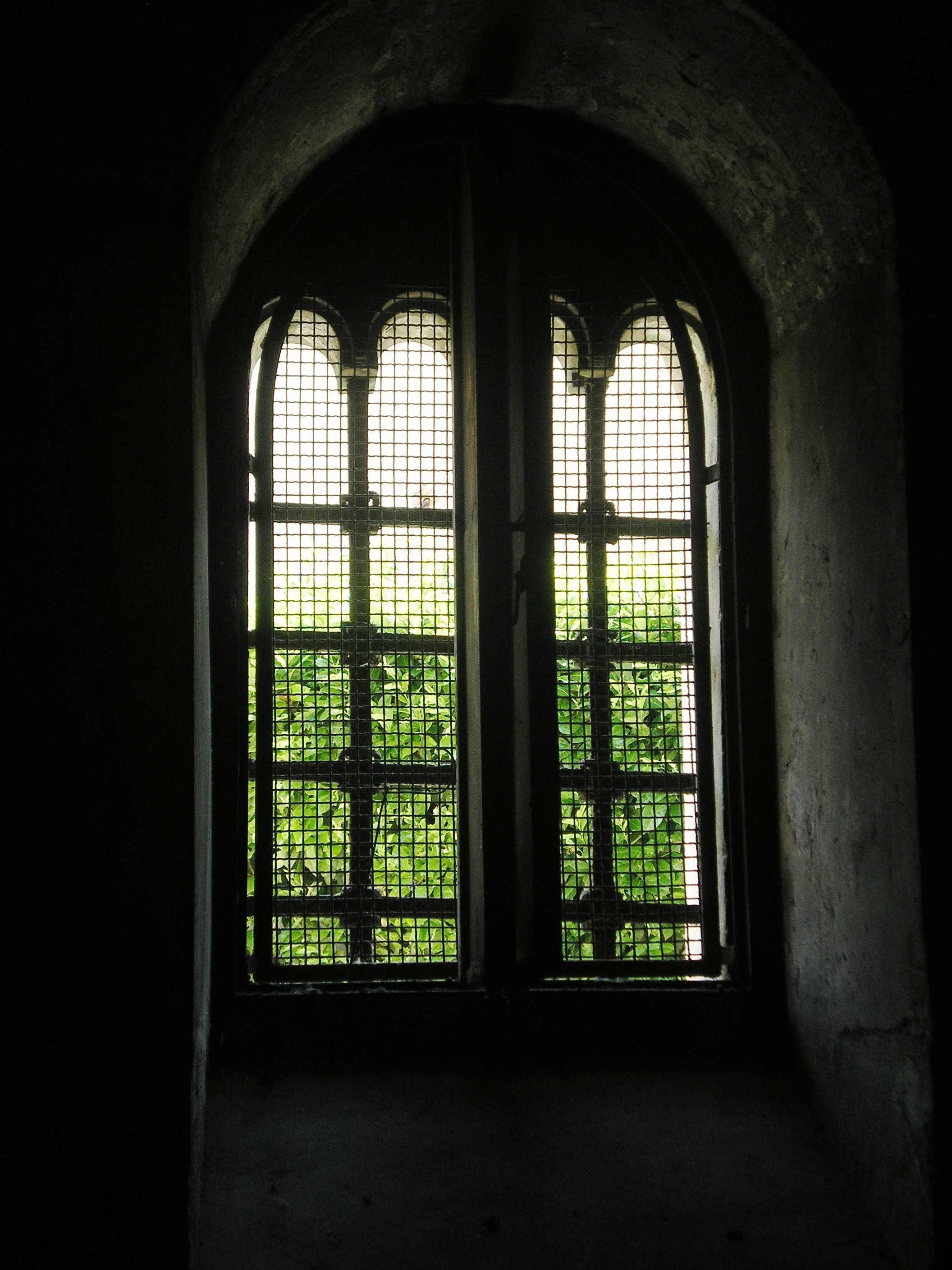
Window of the crypt on the cloister

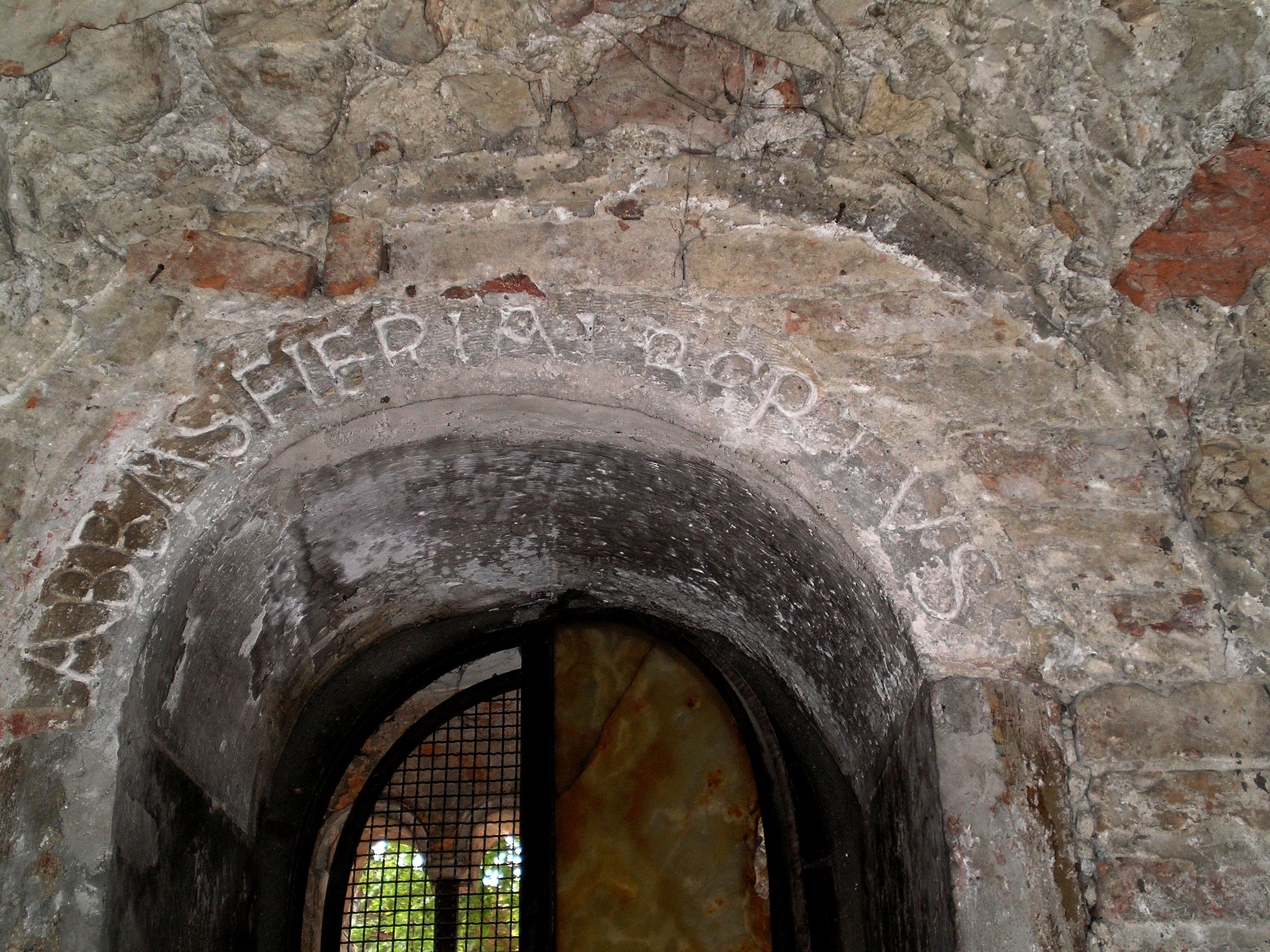
Crypt after restoration

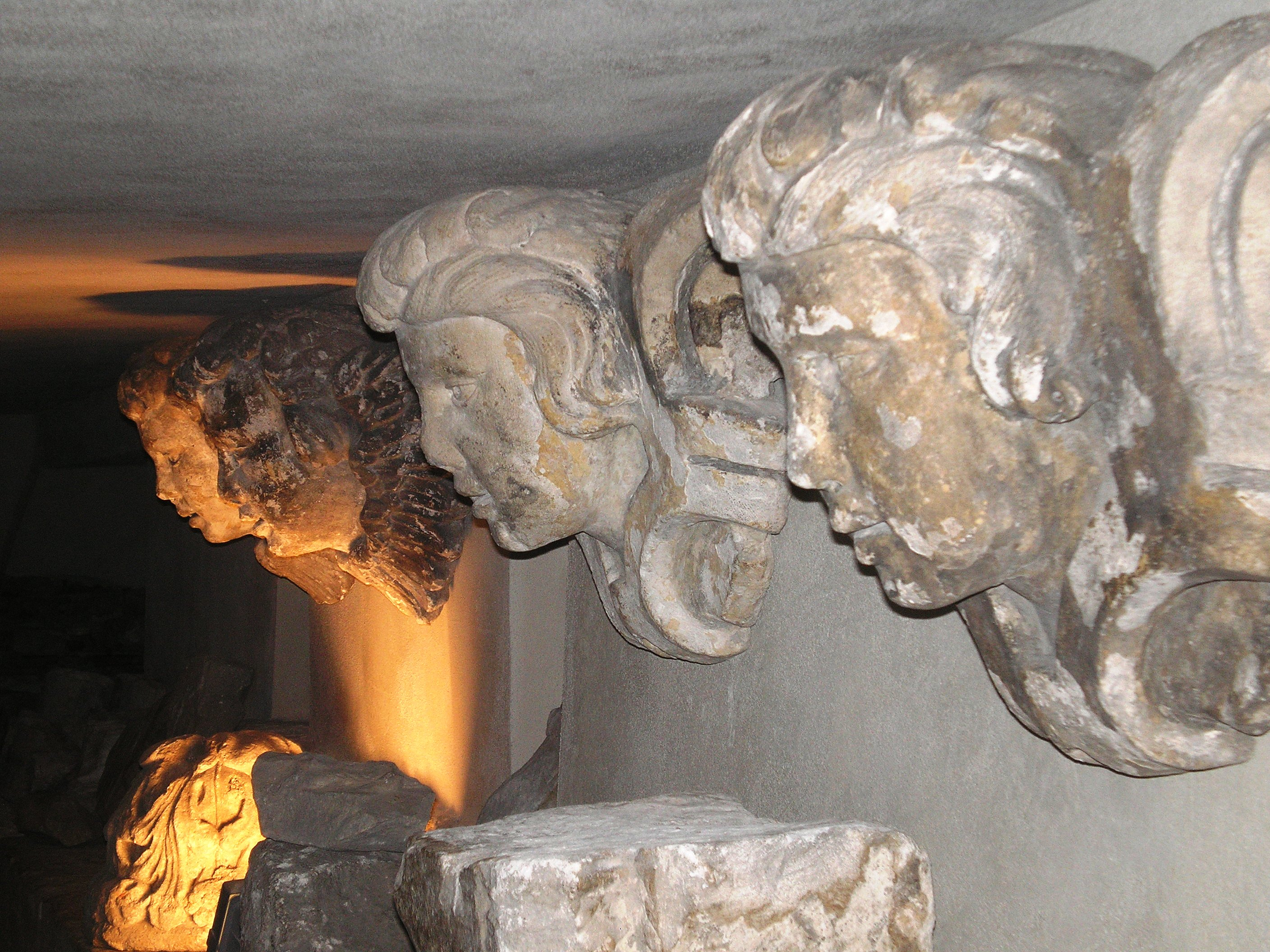
Baroque angel heads in the crypt

==== Mosaics ====
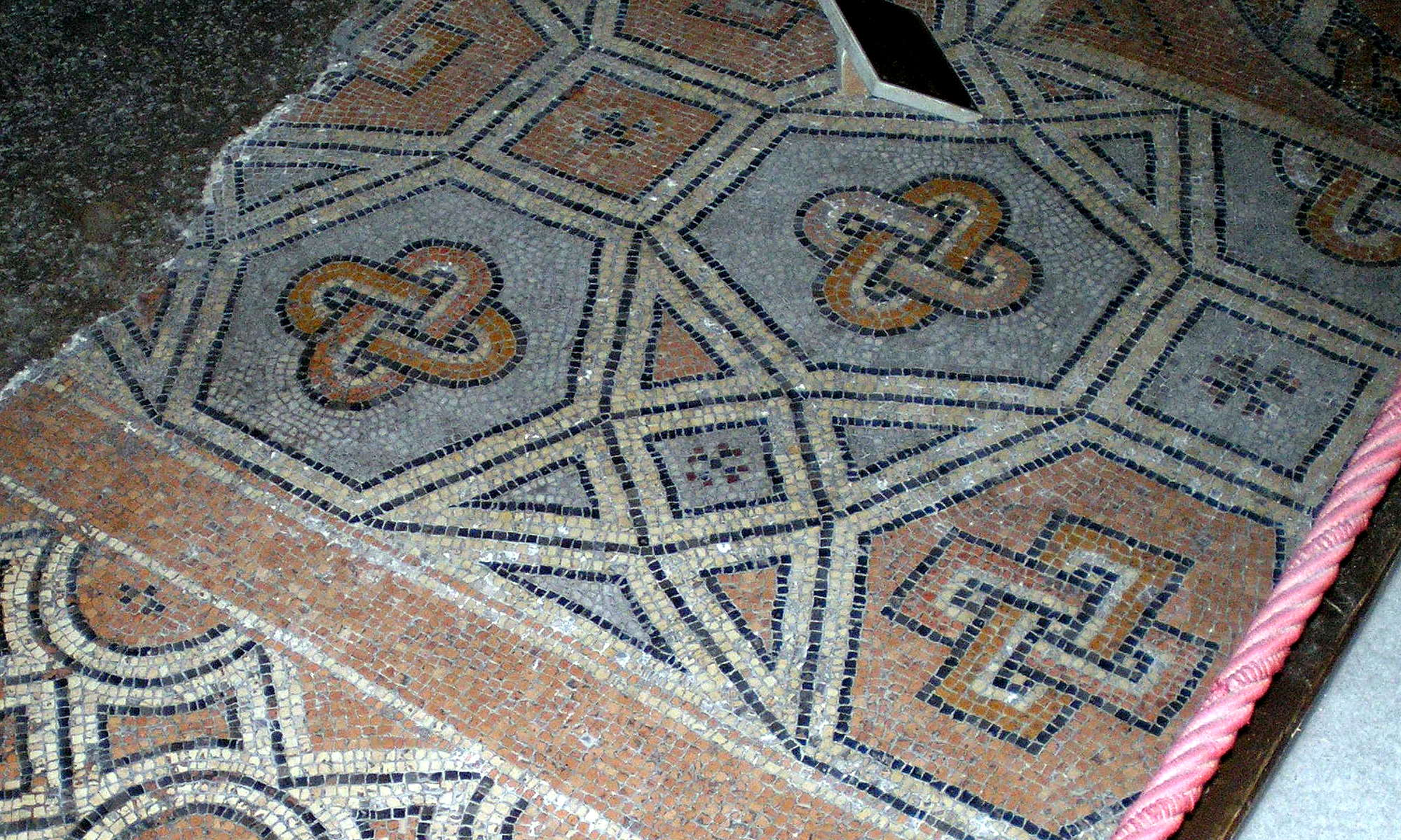
Mosaic

The floor mosaic from the 4th century – belonging to the early church – is one of the most remarkable aspects of the basilica. In the course of time, it was covered by two other layers from later periods, which were not mosaics. As a whole, it appears disordered and fragmentary, consisting of several votive panels with different designs, juxtaposed or overlapping, with the names of the donors, wealthy citizens, appearing at the edges.

The most noble, organic and well-preserved slab is located in front of the entrance and in axis with the hall. It is a square with a composite clipeus in the center, surrounded by a double coil and the inscription Felix cum Toribius et Immola, probably the names of the people of senatorial rank who commissioned it. Other ex-voto slabs include those of Leontius et Mariniana, Carpi et Penetia, Splendonius et Justina, and others.

Two other sections of the mosaic were discovered in 1905 and 1938. It is a very regular mosaic composed of circles connected by black lines, each containing another concentric circle and a small cross in the middle. Two other fragments were discovered in 1974 and 1979. All these floor sections belonged to the fifth-century basilica, and although they belong to the same cultural milieu as that of the early church, they are qualitatively more refined.

==== Sacristy ====
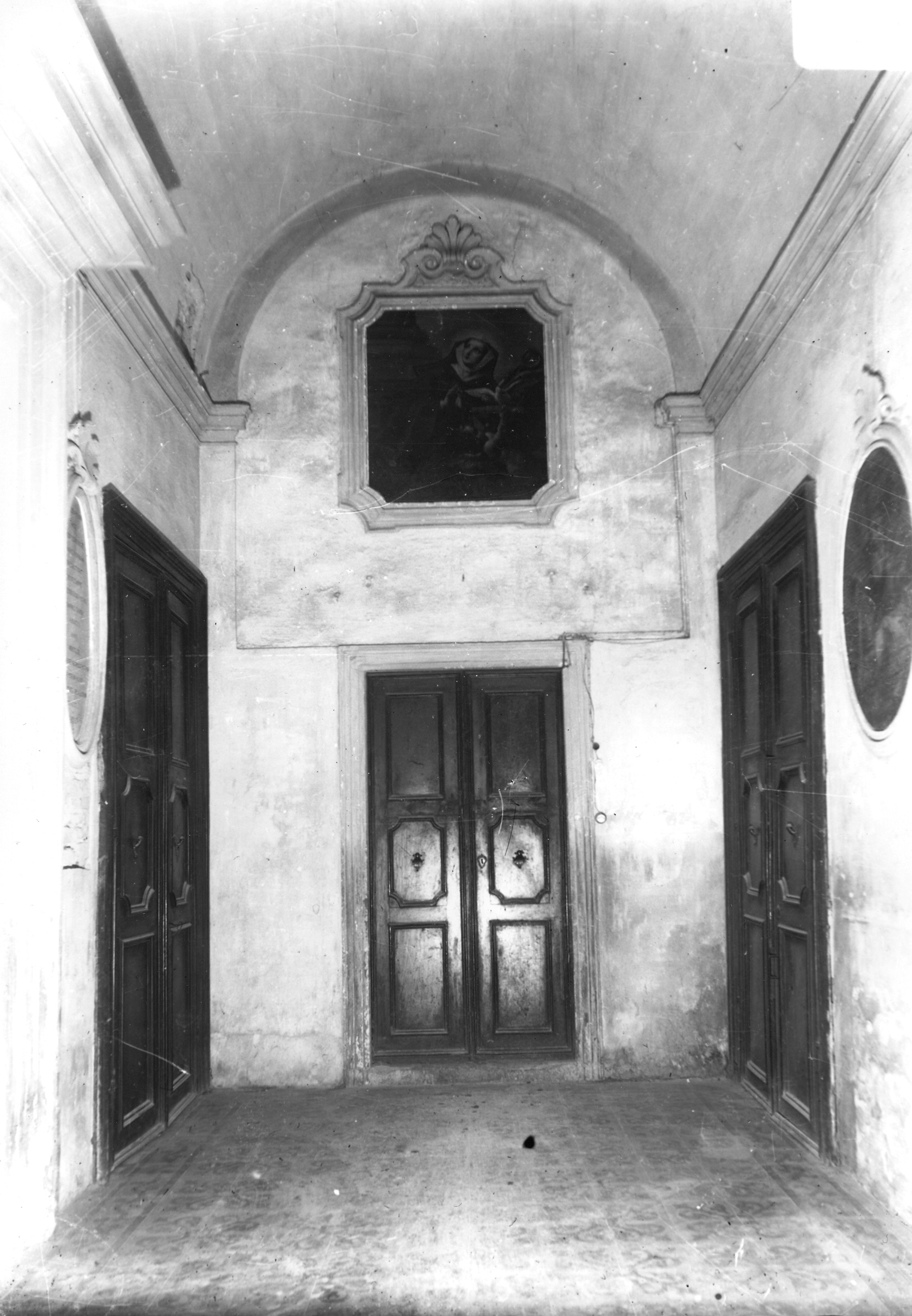
Access to the sacristy, 1930s photo

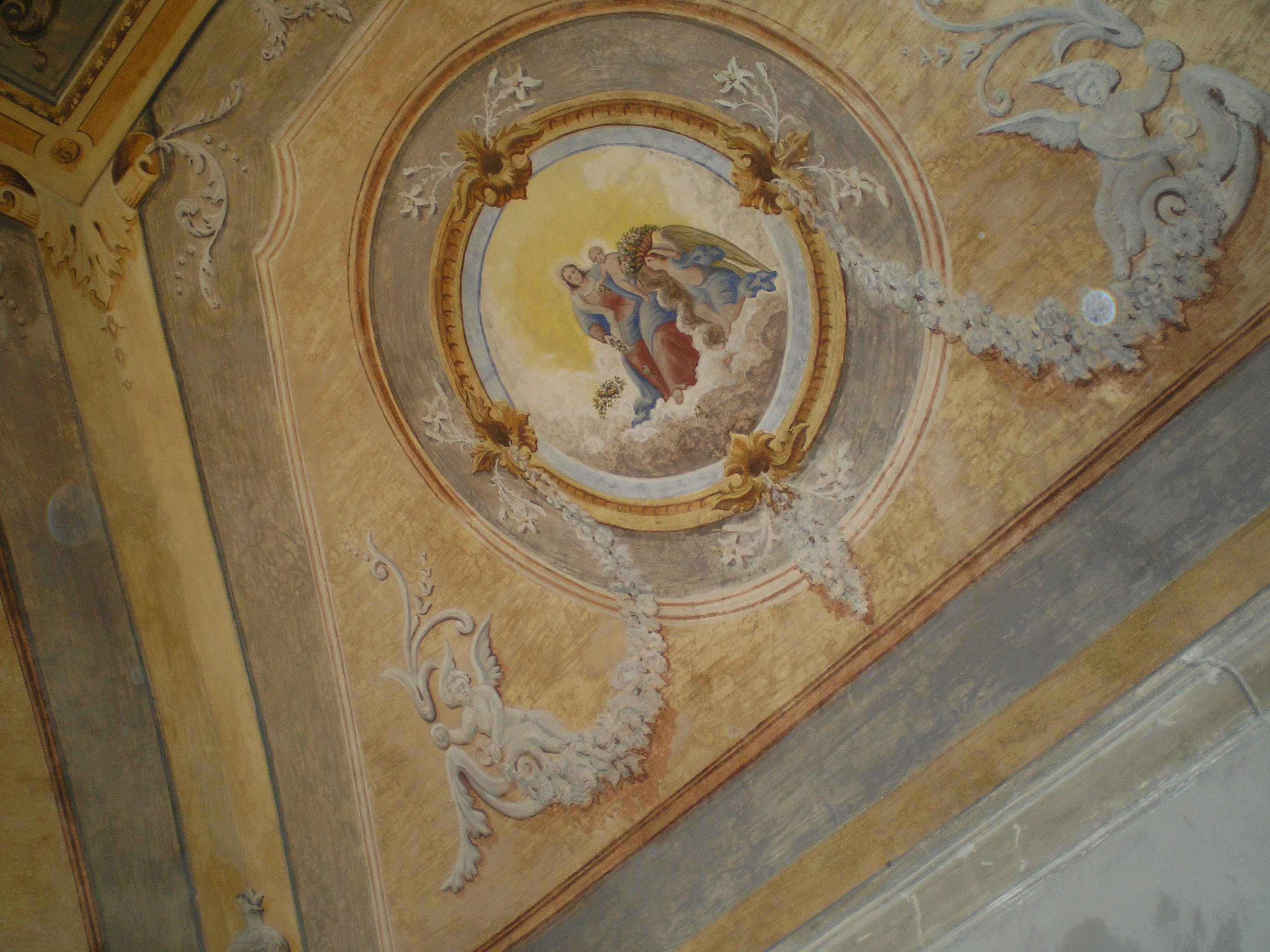
Frescoes in the sacristy

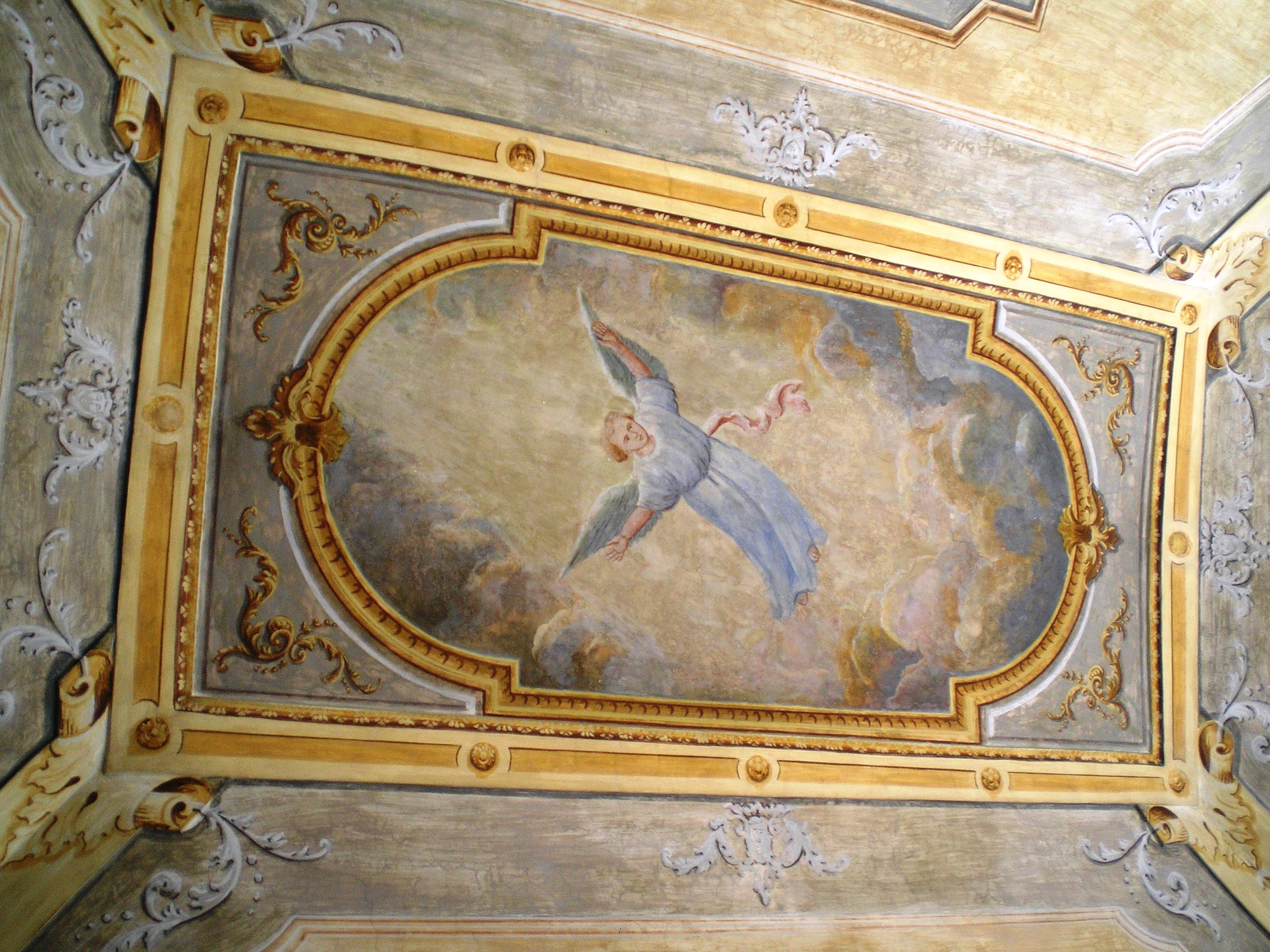
Frescoes in the sacristy

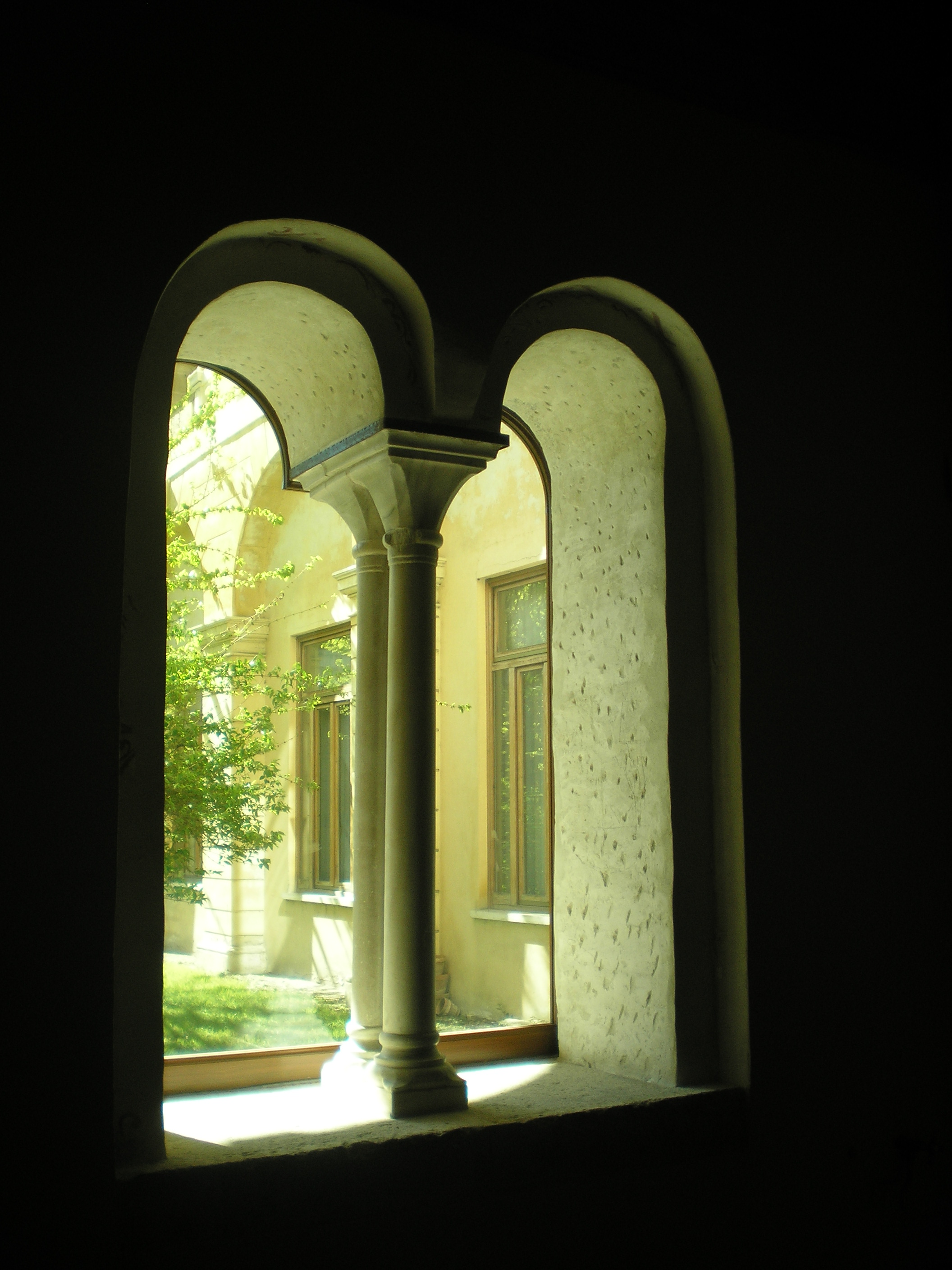
Sacristy window

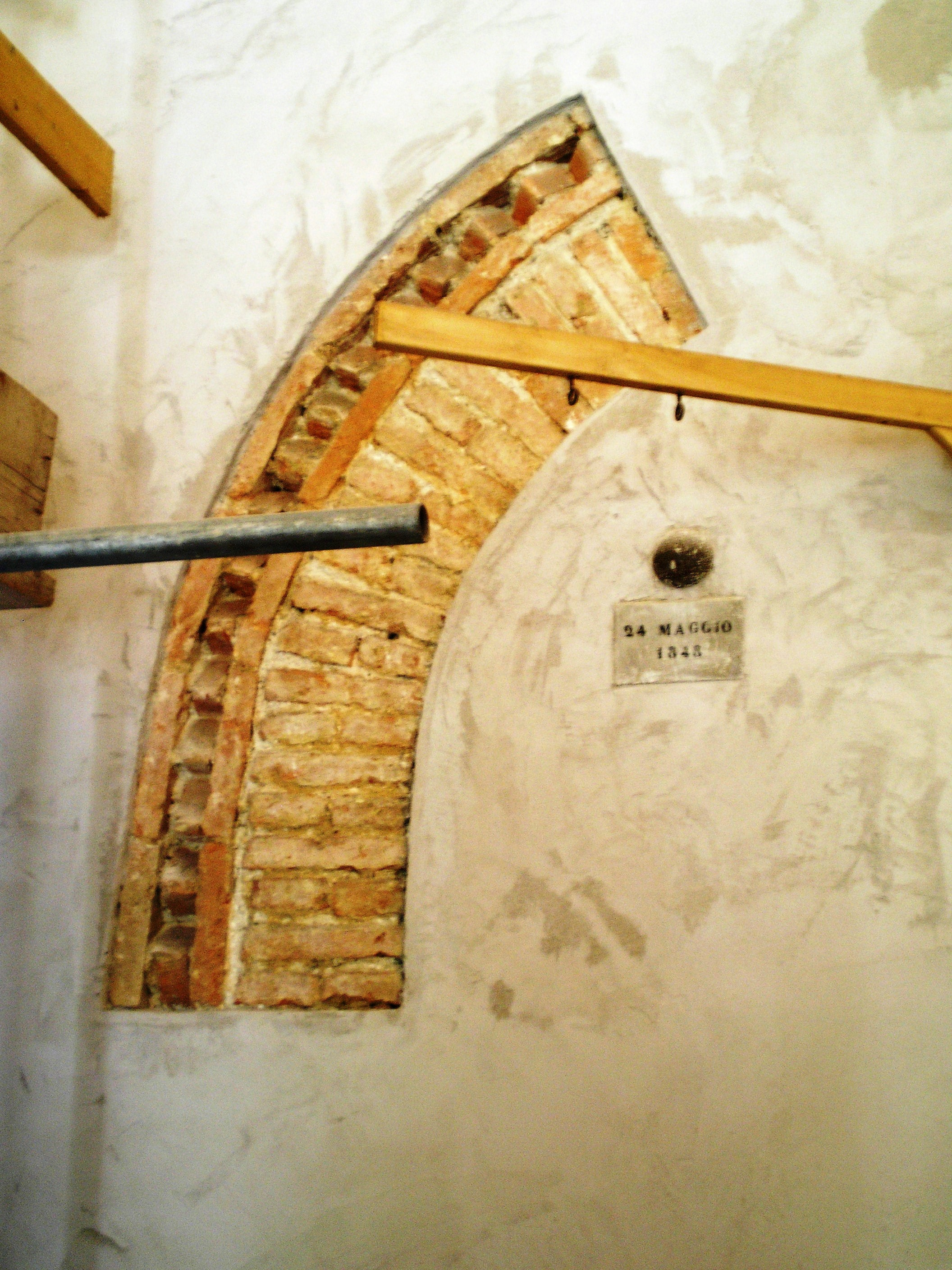
Austrian cannonball of 1848

=== Area in front of the facade ===
The paved area in front of the façade marks the area of the former narthex; however, in Romanesque times it was uncovered; there was probably a small porch above the portal. Further on, there is the column of St. Gall, which shows, in a kind of lantern, the image of the Virgin and, on horseback, the Saints Felix, Fortunatus and Gall. The column was placed in front of the castle gate and was used to hold a banner on the occasion of the annual feasts of St. Felix on August 15 and St. Gall on October 16; it was placed by the French during the siege of 1805 and later raised and placed in front of the façade of the basilica.

In front of the church were placed a number of Roman and early Christian sarcophagi, as a reminder that the whole area was intended as a cemetery. In the 30's the sarcophagi were transferred to Gardone Riviera because they had been donated to Gabriele D'Annunzio for the mausoleum that was being built in the Vittoriale Park. Later, however, the poet decided to use modern replicas and the originals were returned to Vicenza. A Vicenza sarcophagus, however, remained in the Vittoriale and is displayed on the path leading from the villa to the mausoleum.

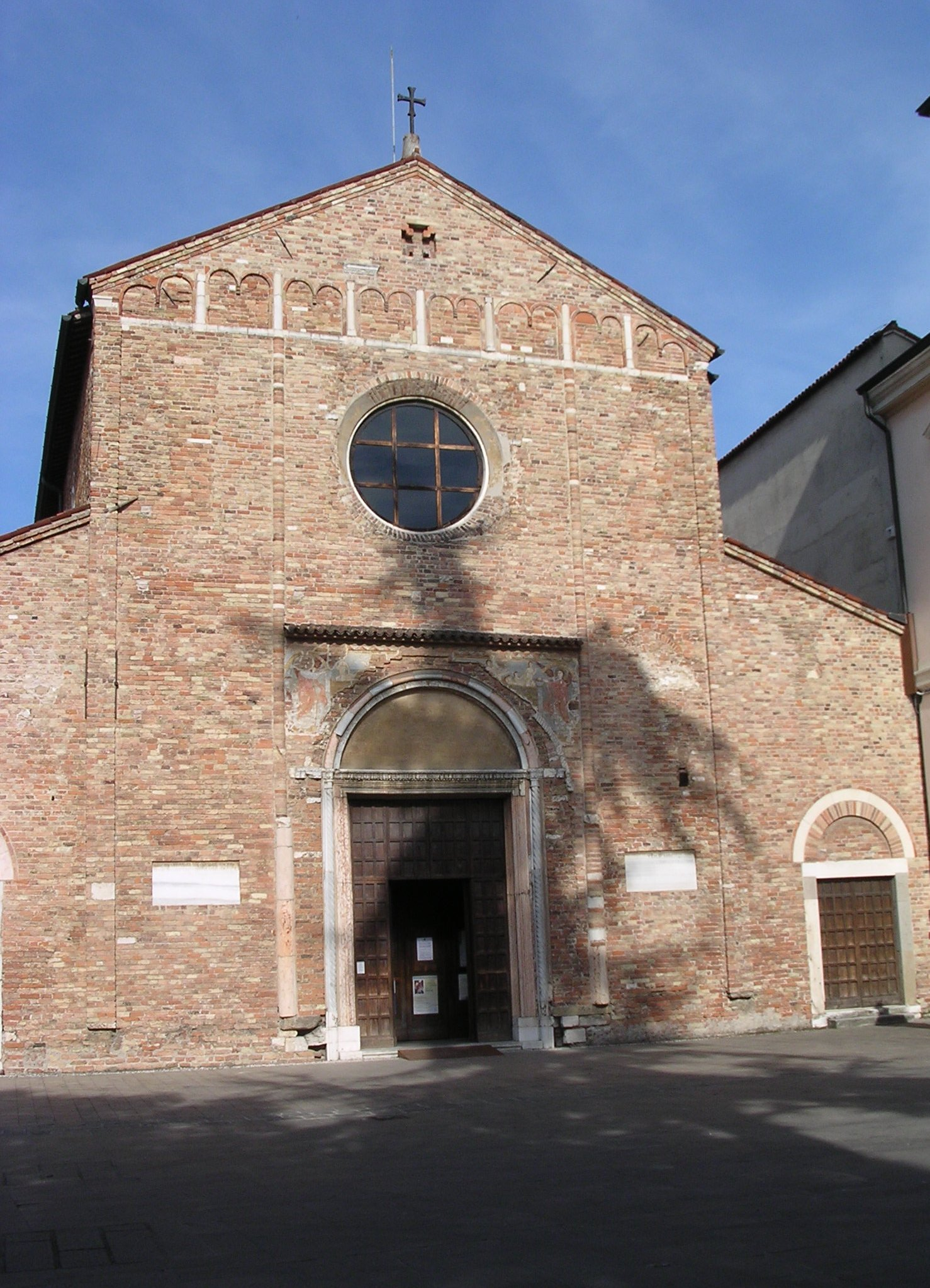
Courtyard and churchyard

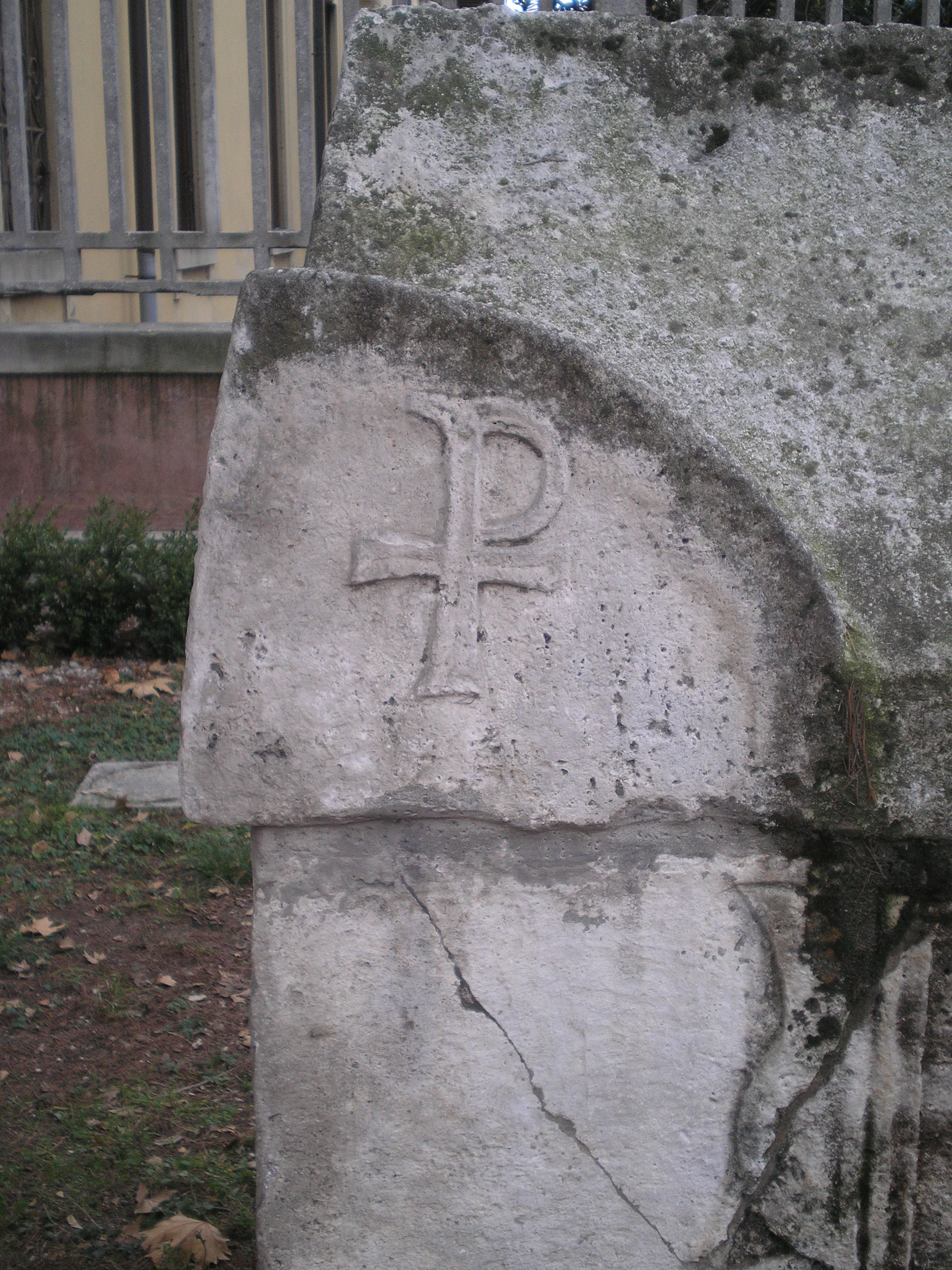
Detail of a sarcophagus

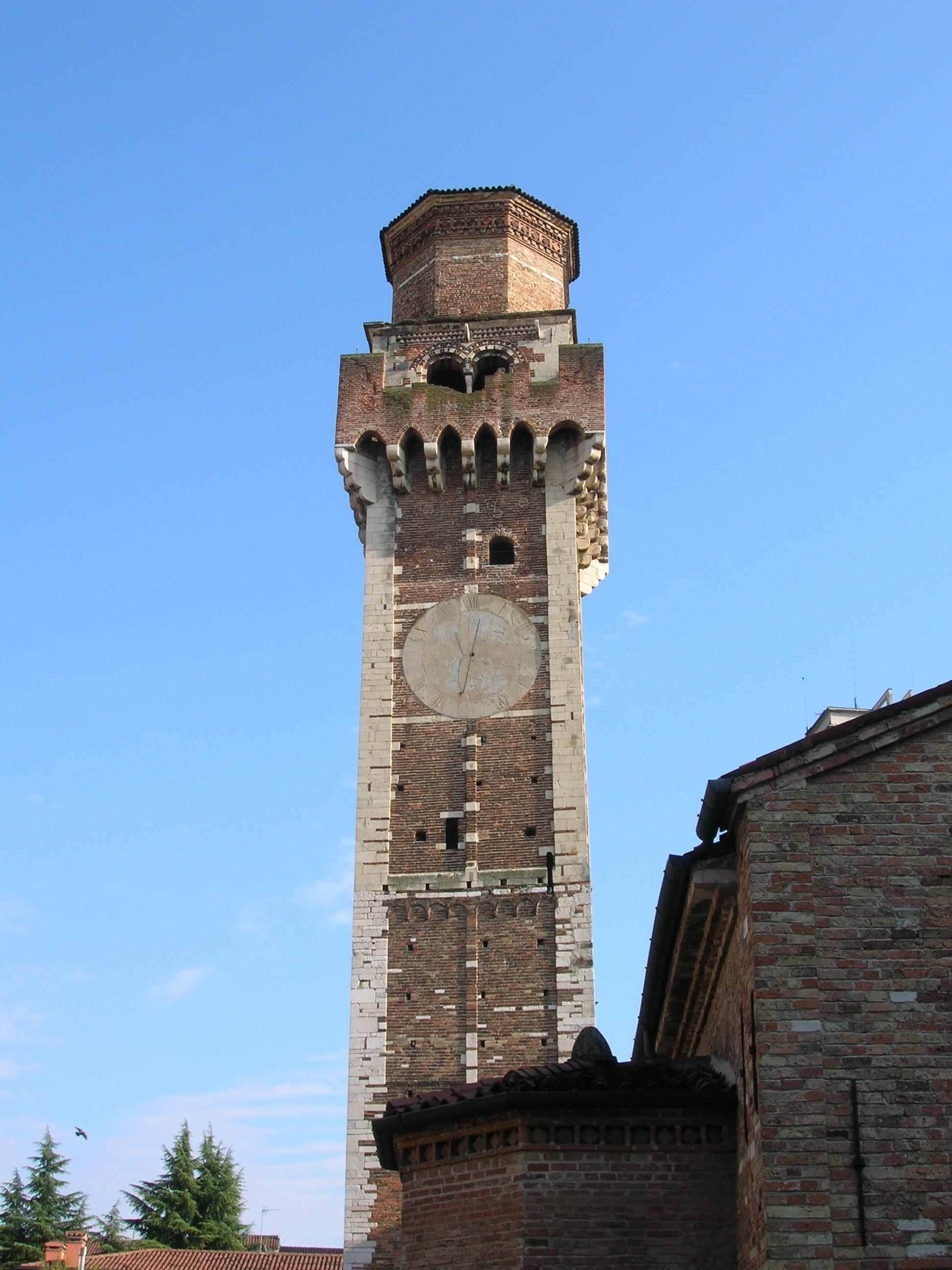
Bell tower.

=== Bell tower ===
On the north side of the basilica is the distinctive bell tower, the best-preserved part of the basilica complex, the only one to survive unscathed from the Baroque reconstructions.

Probably built in the 10th century as a tower to protect the basilica, it was partially destroyed in the earthquake of 1117. The reconstruction, which turned it into a bell tower, preserved the basement of the original structure up to one-third of its height, consisting largely of Roman stones.

The second part has a cornice with small arches, identical to those of the apse and therefore most likely dating from the first half of the 12th century.

In the 14th century, the tiburium and the merlons were added, forming the chemin de ronde and transforming the bell tower into a watch and defense tower connected to the nearby fortress of Rocchetta, a function it actually had, so much so that a cistern was built inside to collect water for use in case of siege.

Currently, the bell tower is about 42 meters high and due to the subsidence of the ground on which it is built, it is tilted 70 cm from the vertical axis. The importance of this construction is such that it is considered the meridian of the city, which passes through the bell tower itself. It houses 10 bells in the diatonic scale of F# major.

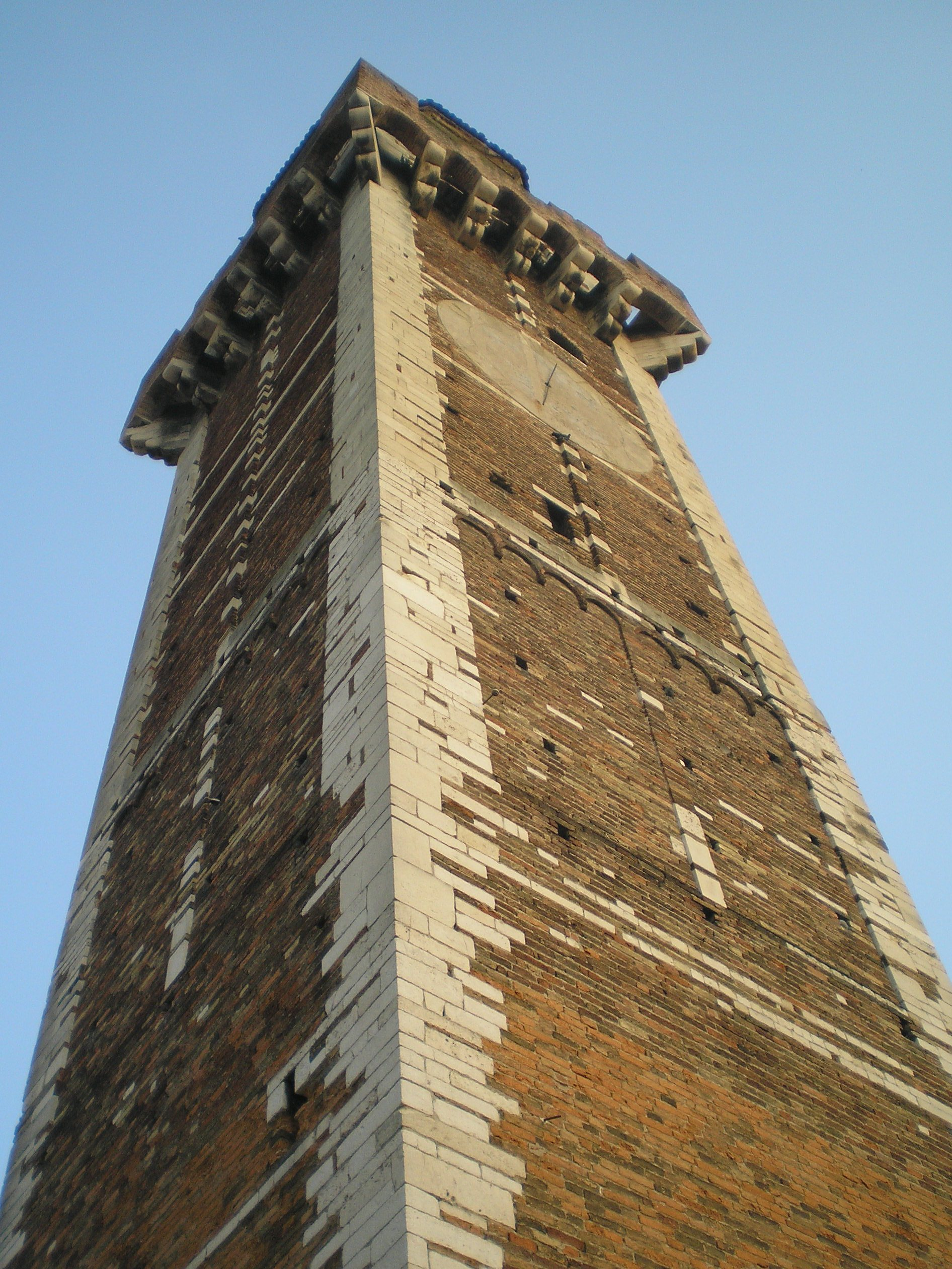
Tower before restoration

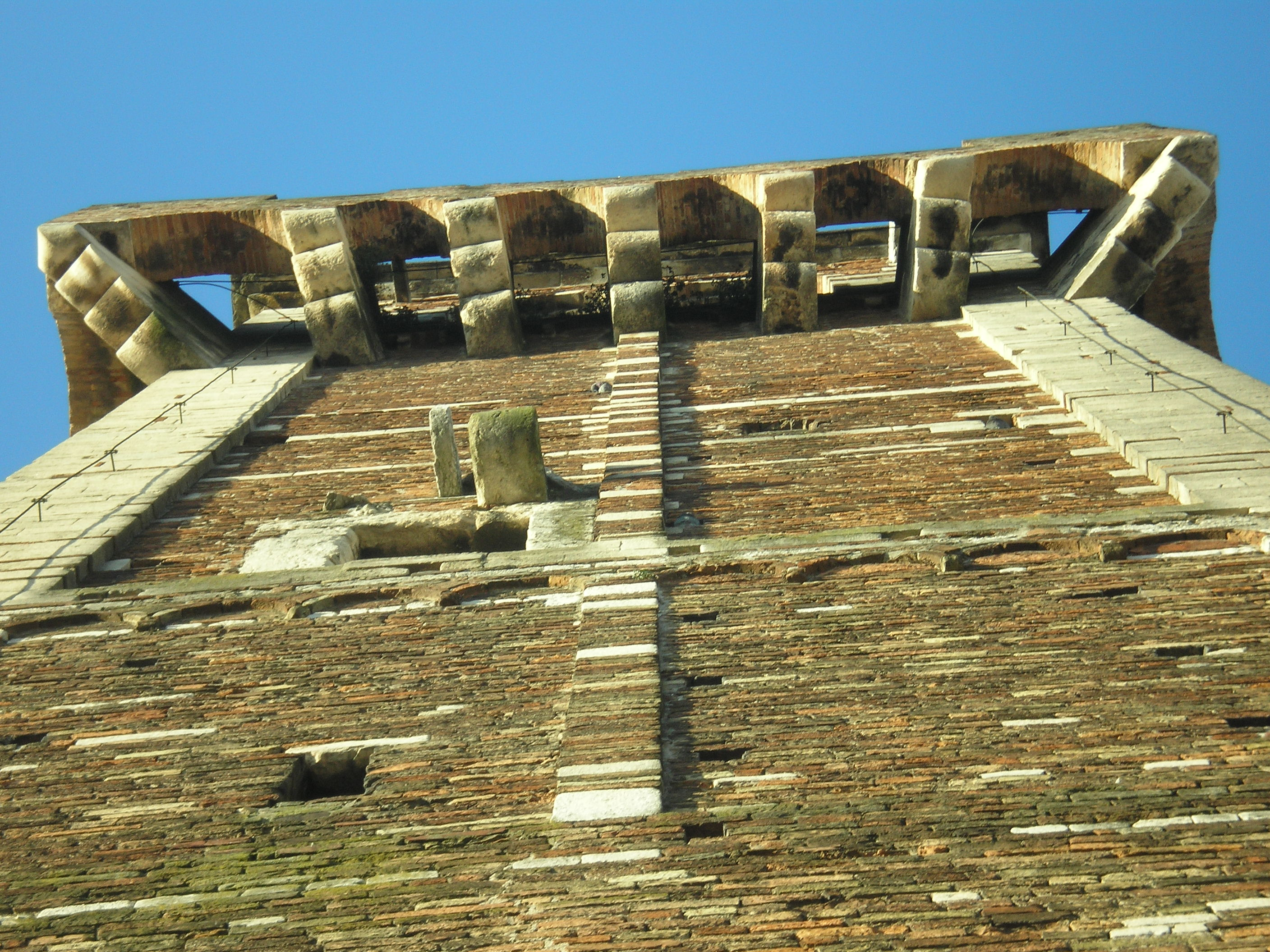
Late 14th-century merlon

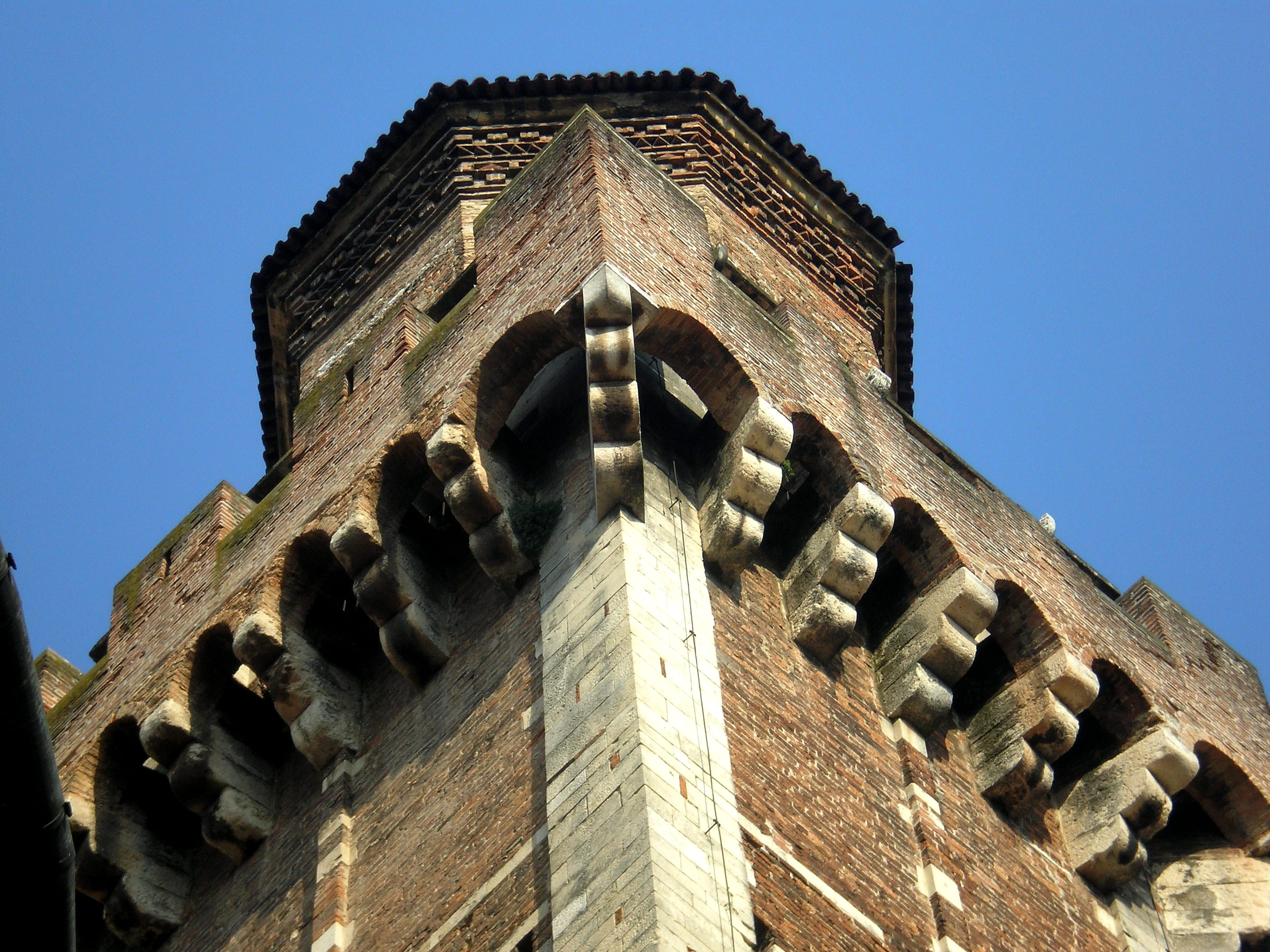
Merlon

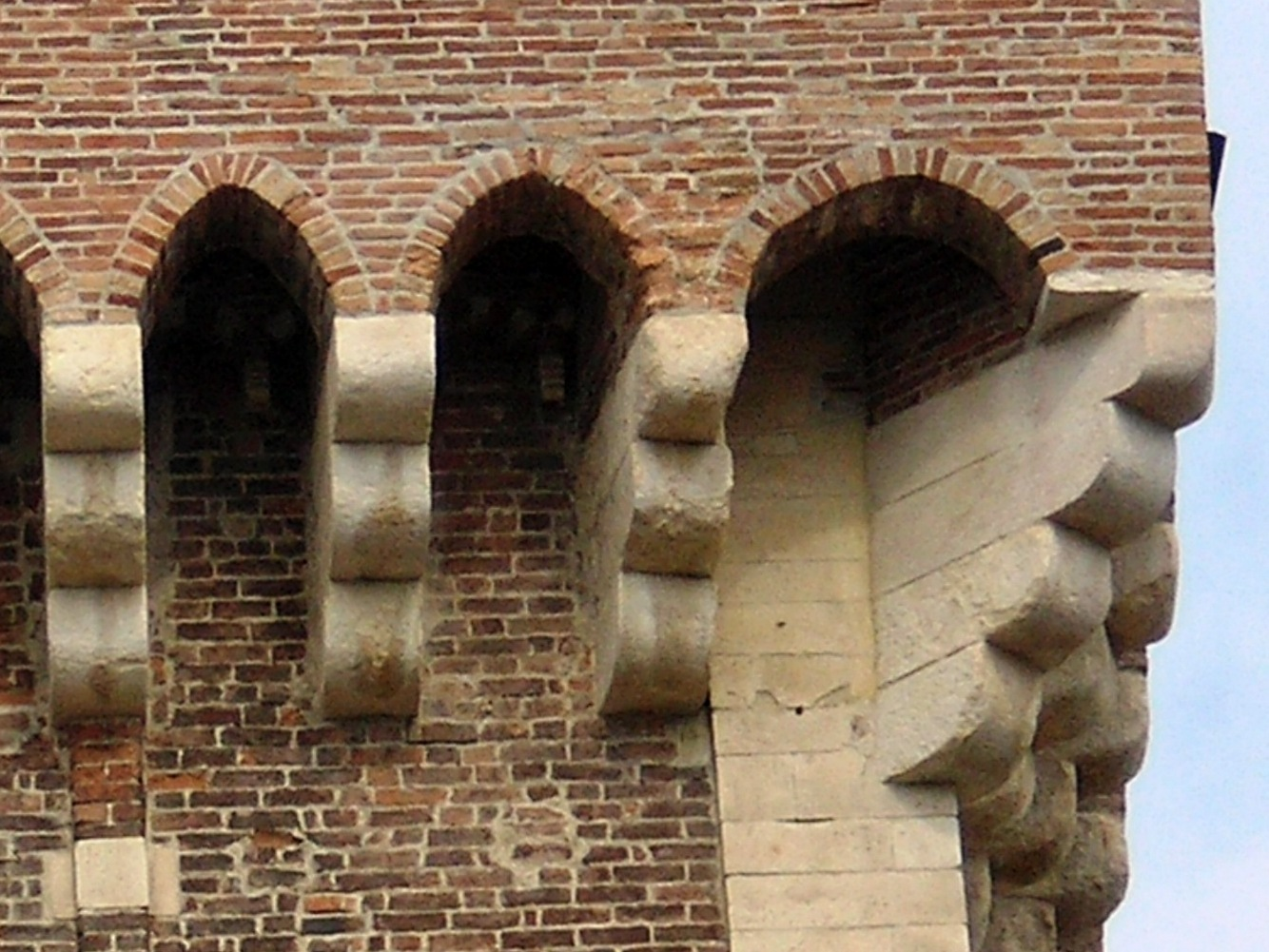
Brackets of the battlements

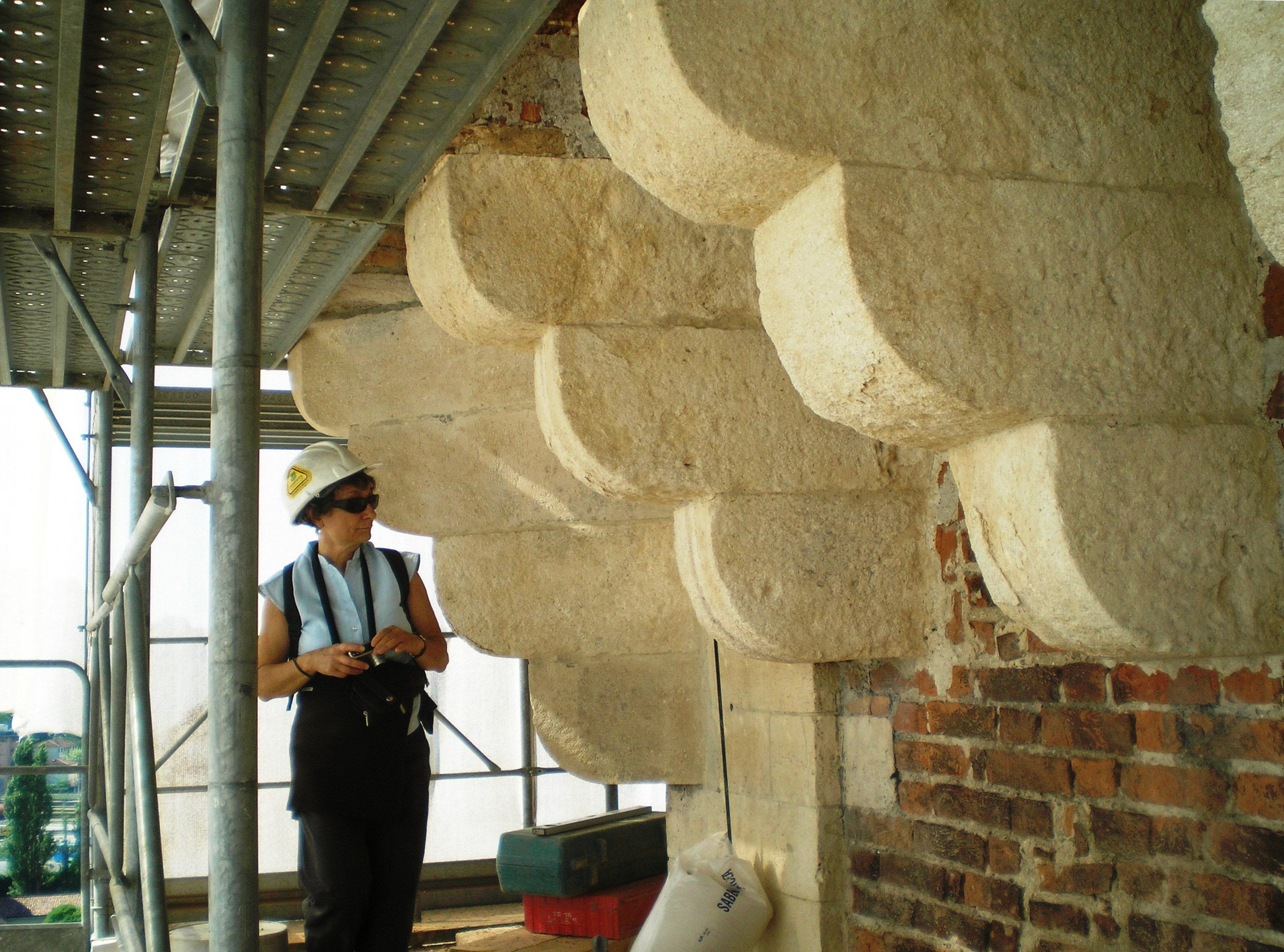
Brackets of the battlements

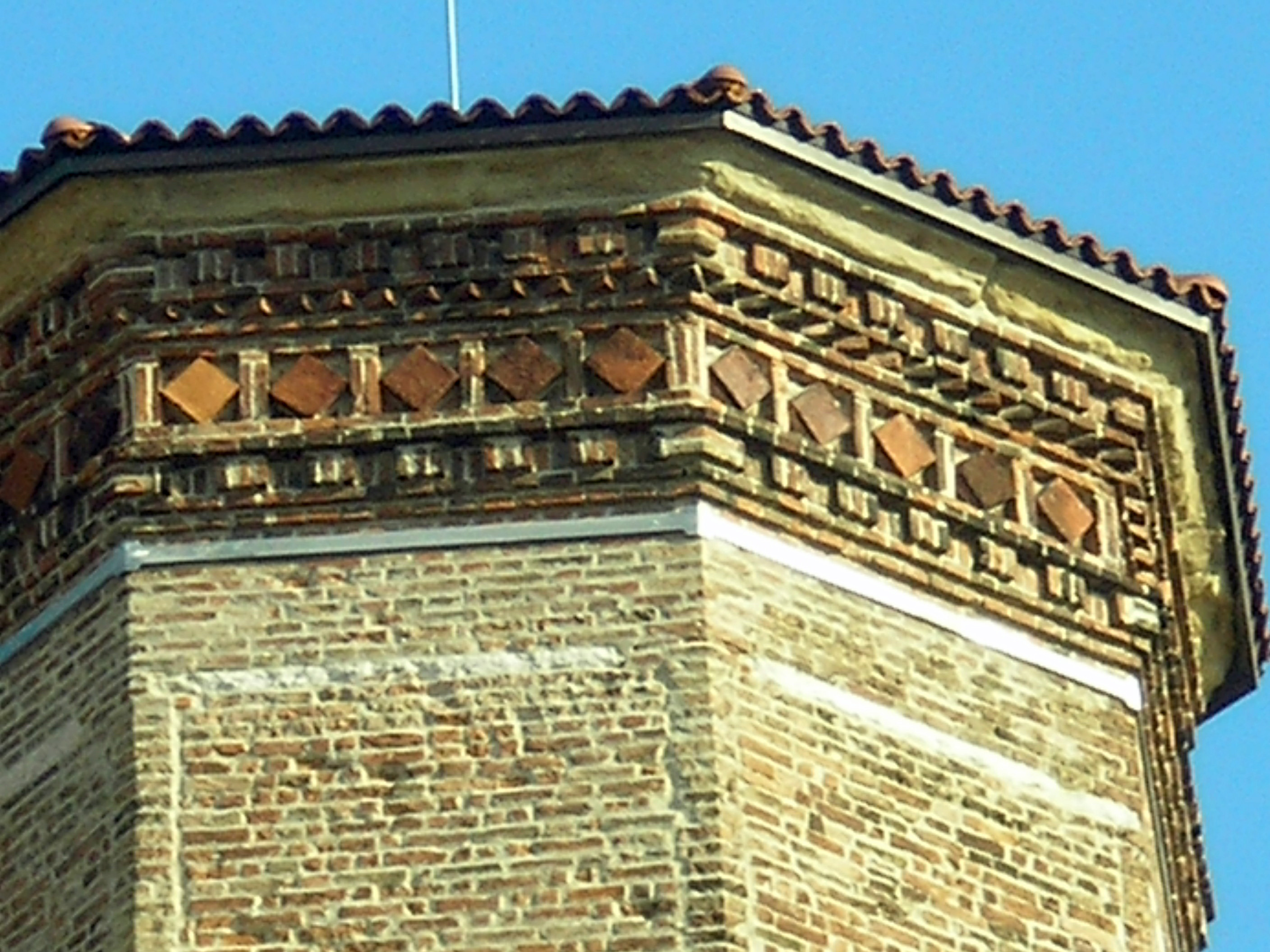
Tiburium of the late 14th century

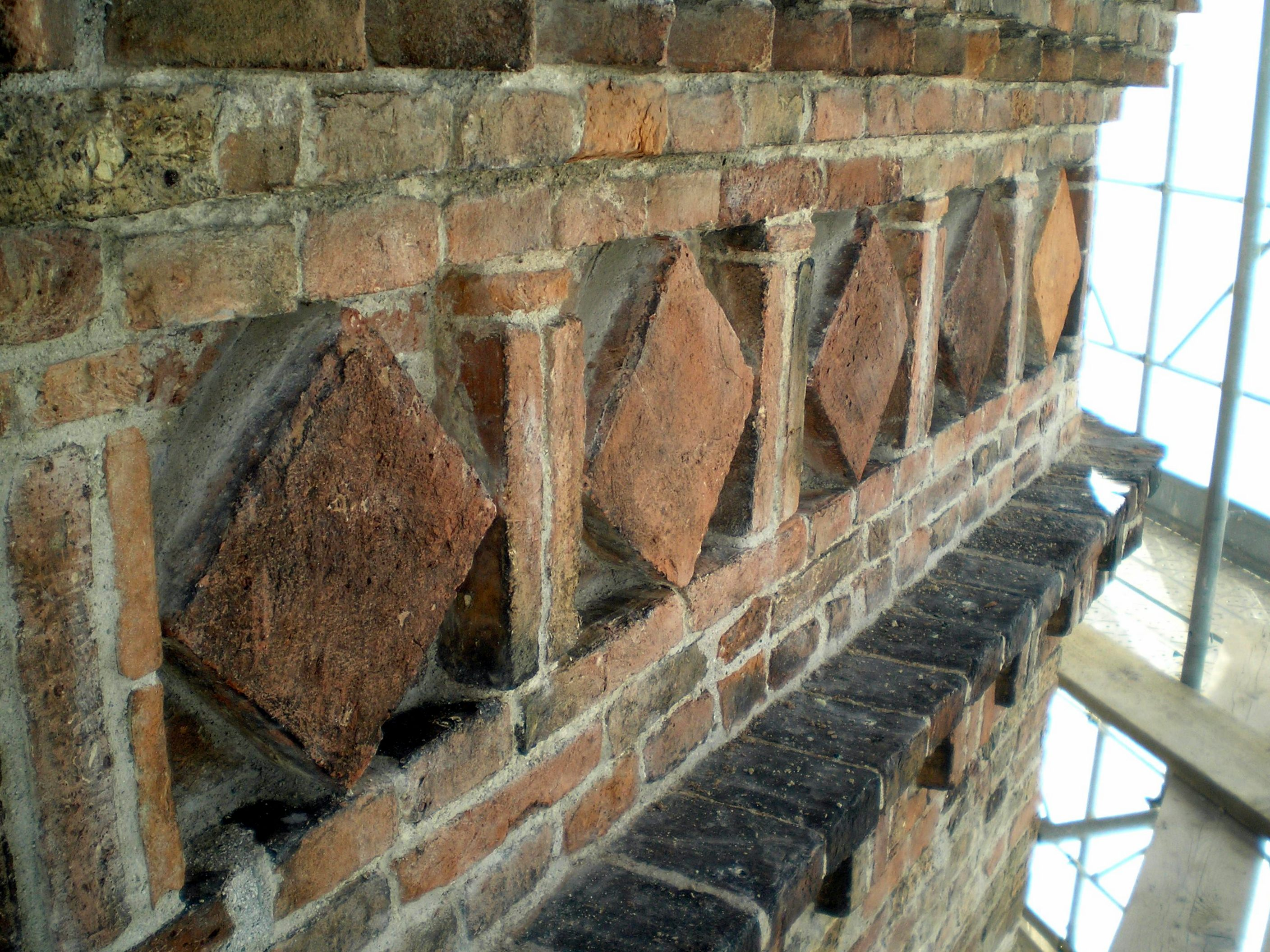
Ornamental band of the tiburium

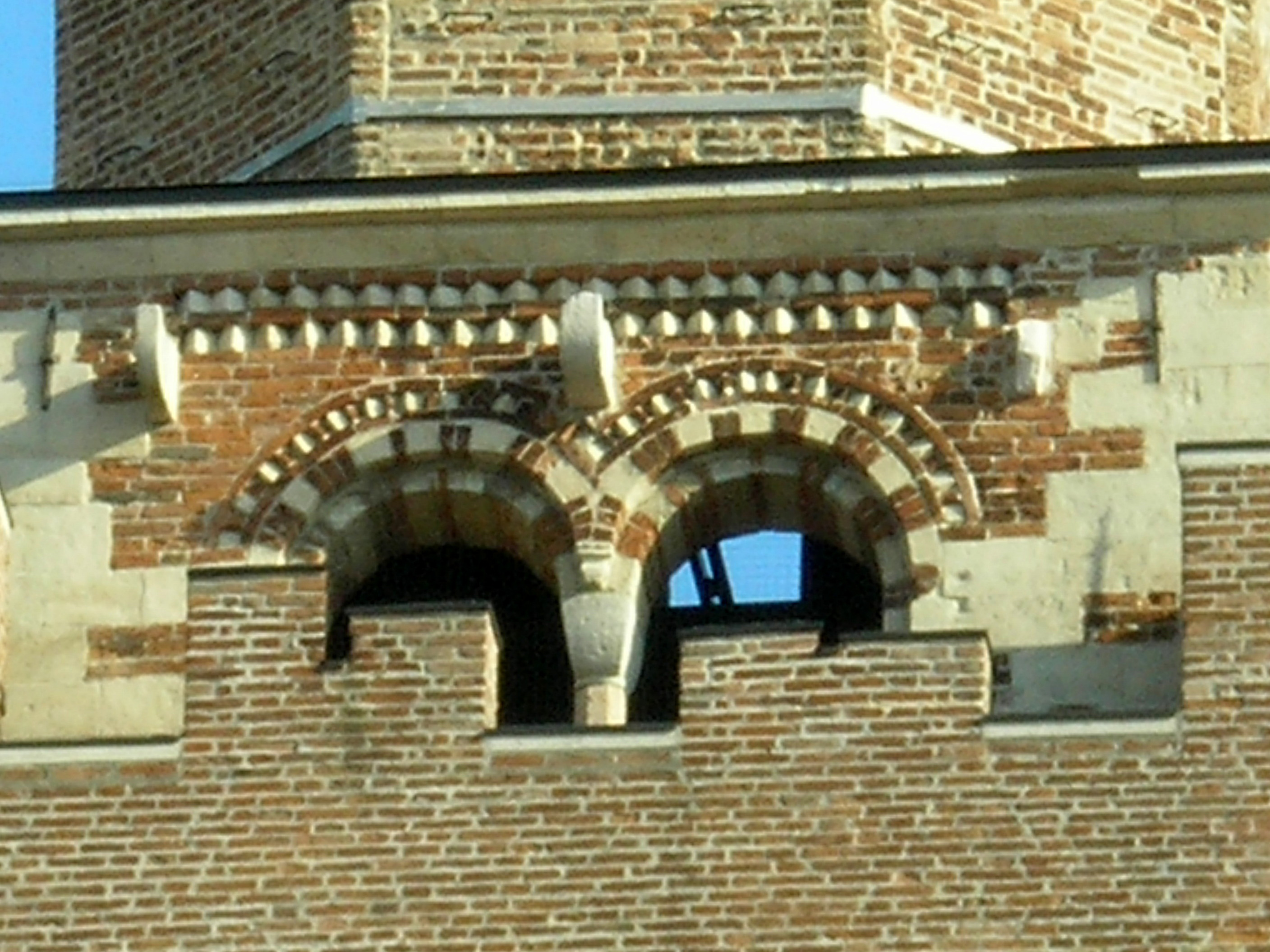
Biforas of the belfry

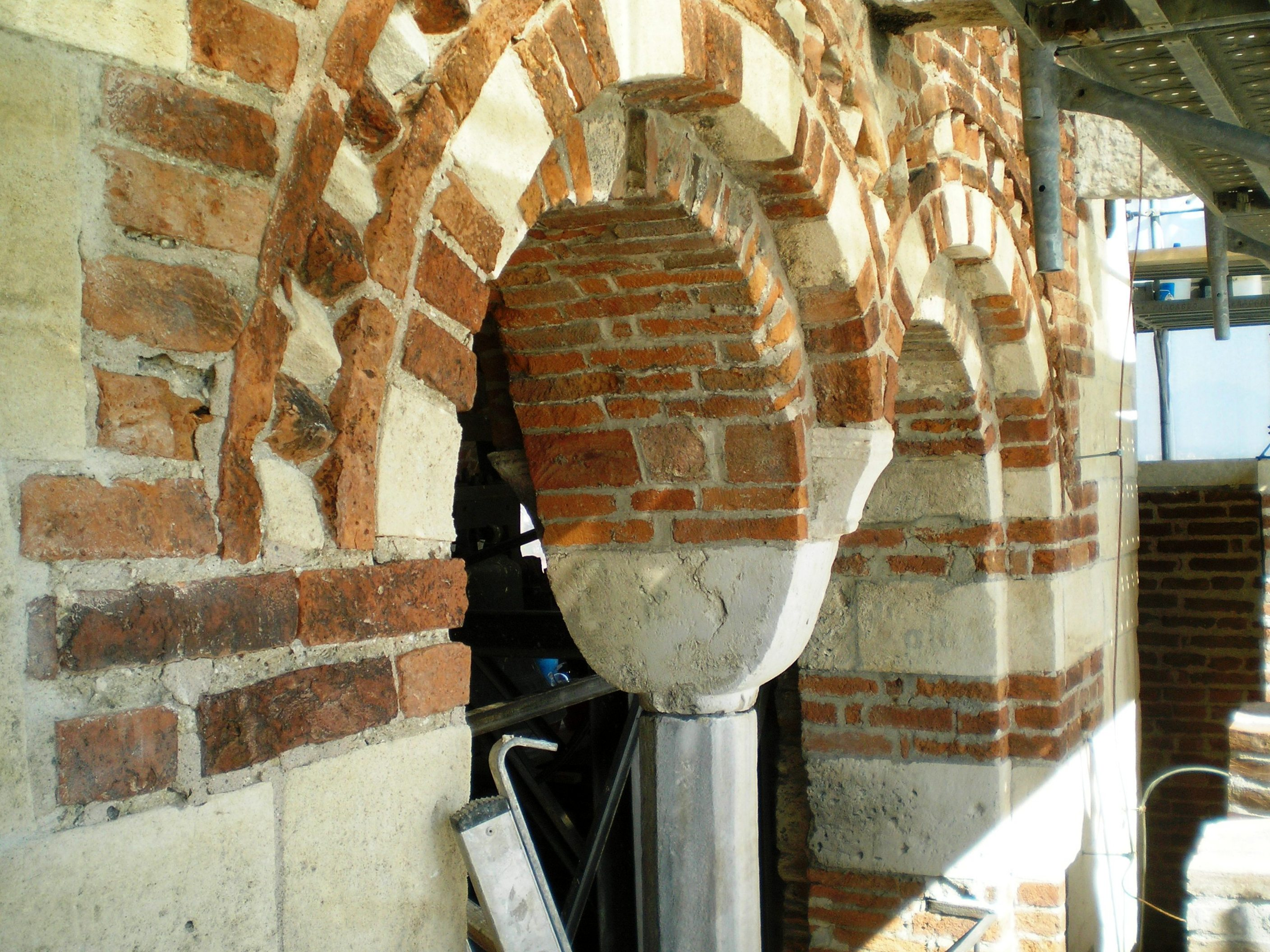
Biforas of the belfry

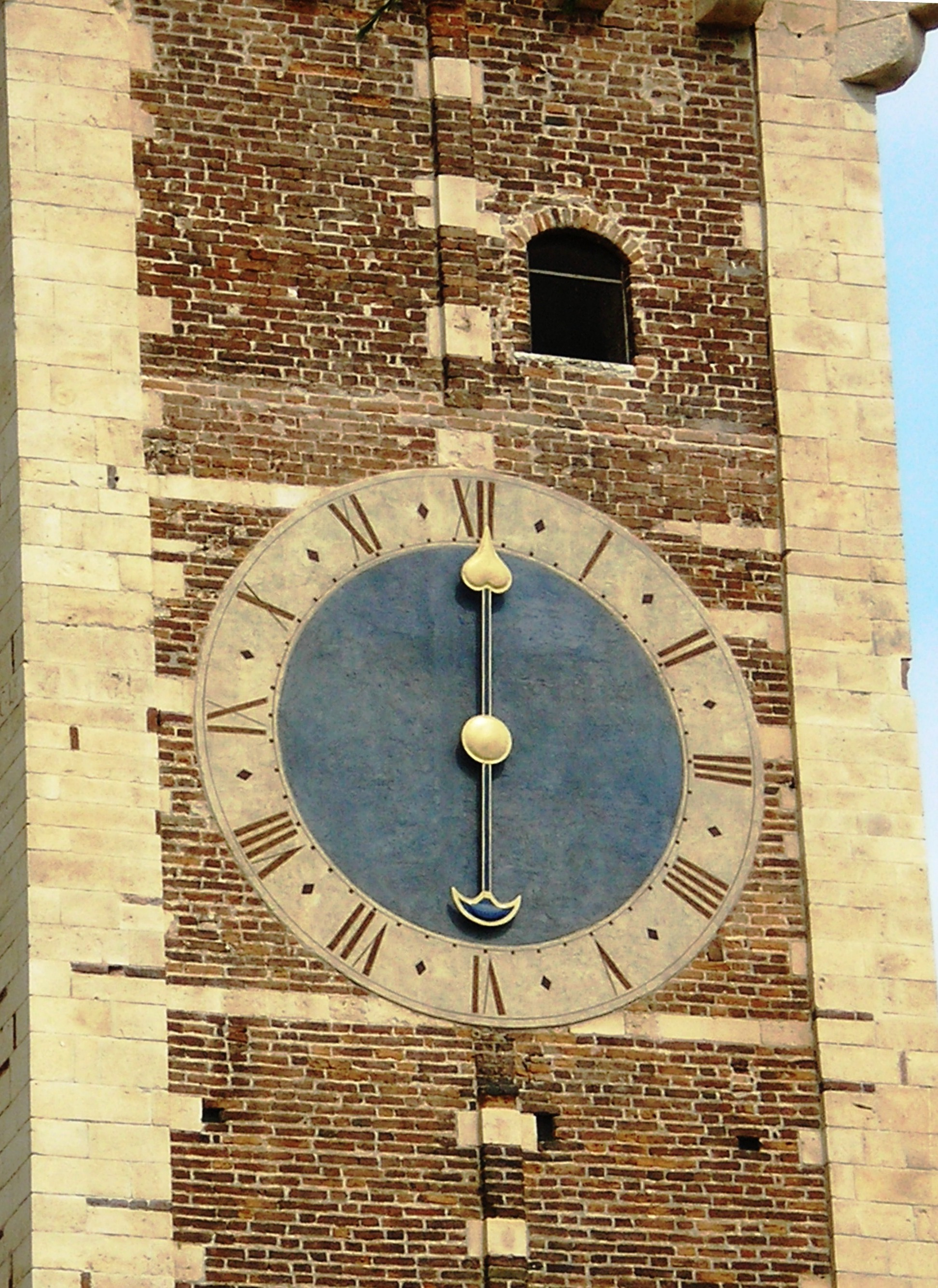
Restored clock

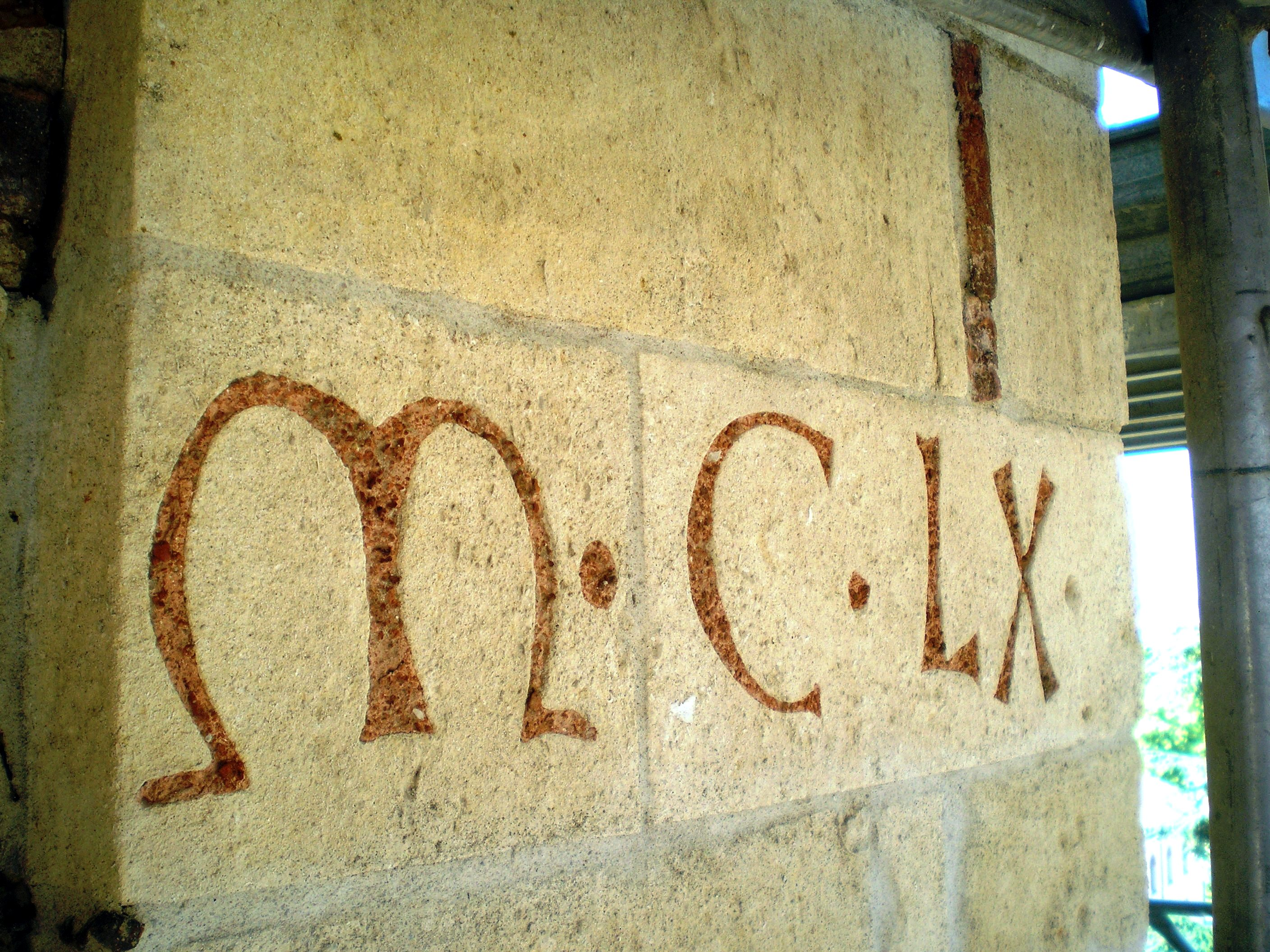
Date of reconstruction (1160)

=== Martyrion ===
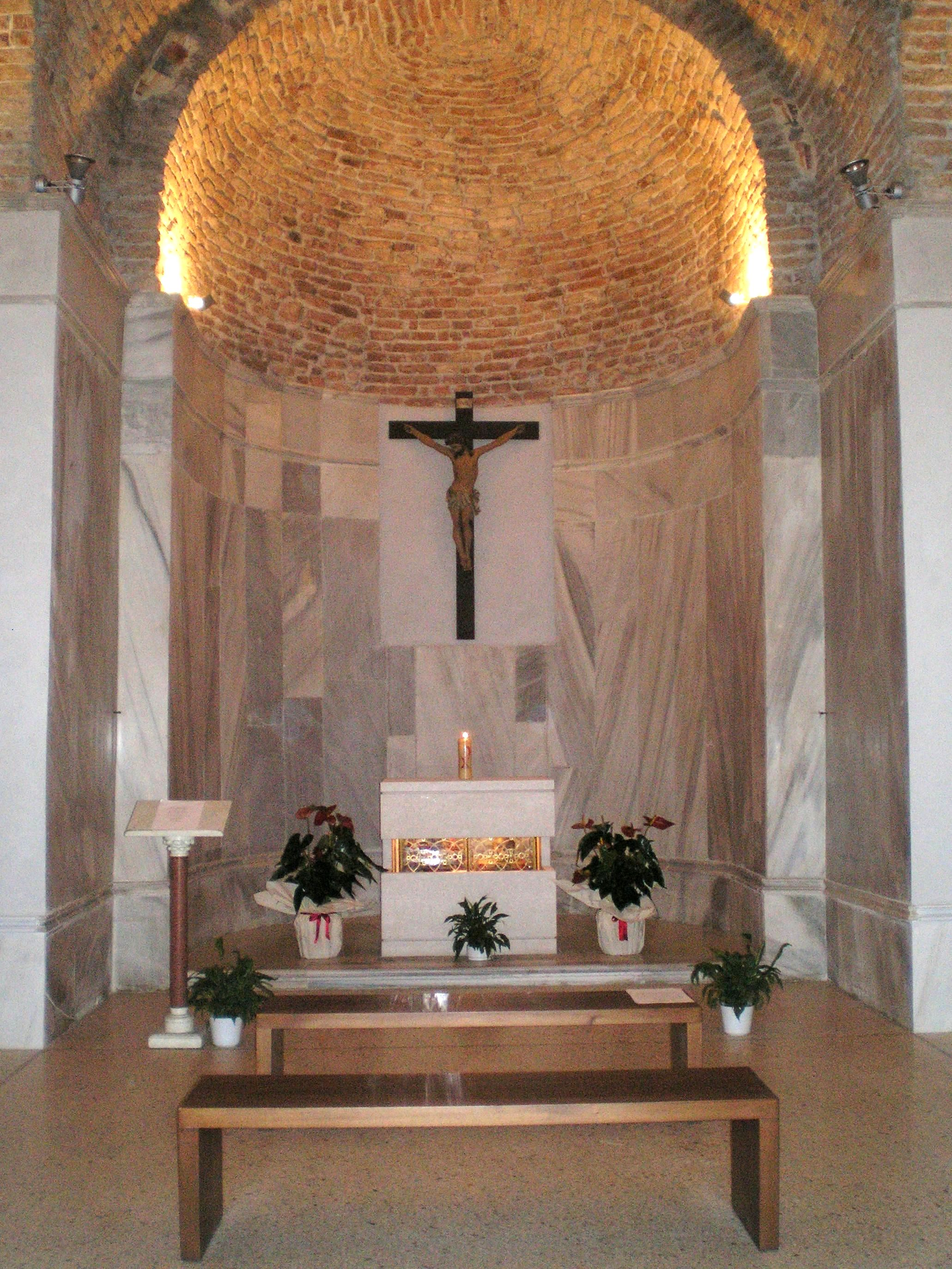
Interior of the Martyrion after restoration

Next to the basilica is the Martyrion, a valuable chapel built in the 5th century to venerate martyred saints and later to house their relics. In the 6th or 7th century, the sacellum was given the title of Santa Maria Mater Domini and underwent profound architectural and decorative changes.

On the outside, the structure is characterized by extreme simplicity: it appears as a parallelepiped surmounted by a small cube – a tiburium of almost cubic form that hides the small dome – partly still incorporated in the adjacent buildings; on the east side, an apse protrudes, surrounded by a polygonal shell. It is accessed from inside the basilica through a rectangular atrium with a barrel vault roof, partly painted with polychrome longitudinal stripes.

Inside, the plan has the shape of a Greek cross inscribed in a square, with very short sides, about 4 meters wide, at the intersection of which an irregular hemispherical dome, a little over 2 meters high, is grafted. According to the testimony of the Vicentine historian Francesco Barbarano, a templon, supported by four small columns resting on plutei, separated the faithful from the sacred space where the relics of the martyrs were kept, and contained the dedicatory inscription to Maria mater Domini.

Of great value are the early Christian mosaics found in the corners of the central quadrangle: the remaining fragments reveal the presence of a particularly refined mosaic apparatus – which originally covered the dome, the splays, the archivolts and the semi-dome – rich in details executed with great precision: they represent a winged lion and a clypeate saint, that is, inserted in a clipeus, depicted according to the stylistic features of the Hellenistic period. There are also pomegranates, a symbol of immortality, and vine branches, which recall the words of Christ in John 15:1–11. In some parts of the walls there are still traces of ancient frescoes, most of which have been lost.

The small semicircular apse is covered with Proconnesian marble, which ennobles the area where the remains of the saints are kept and hides the simple masonry used.

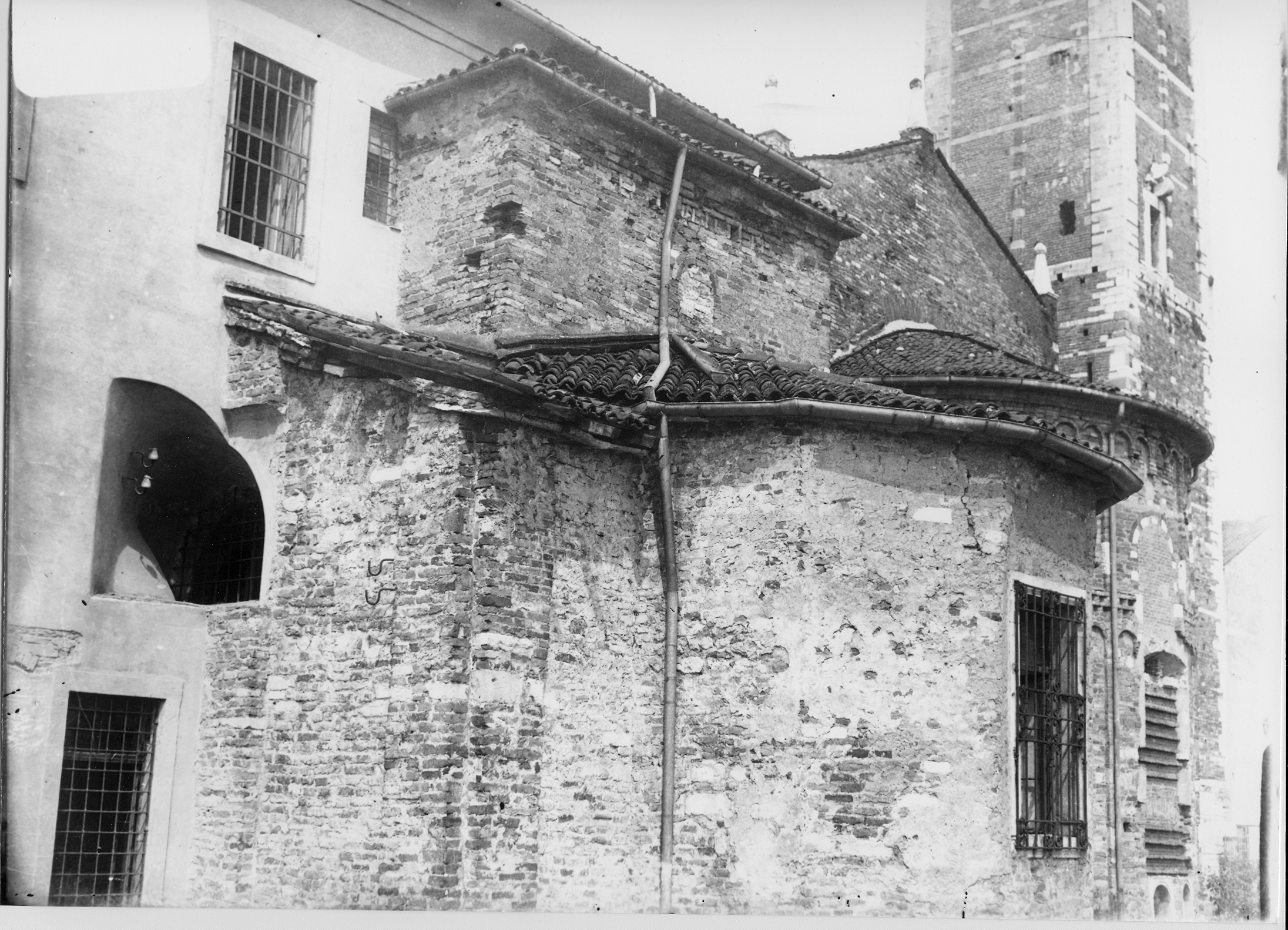
Exterior of the Martyrion in the 1930s

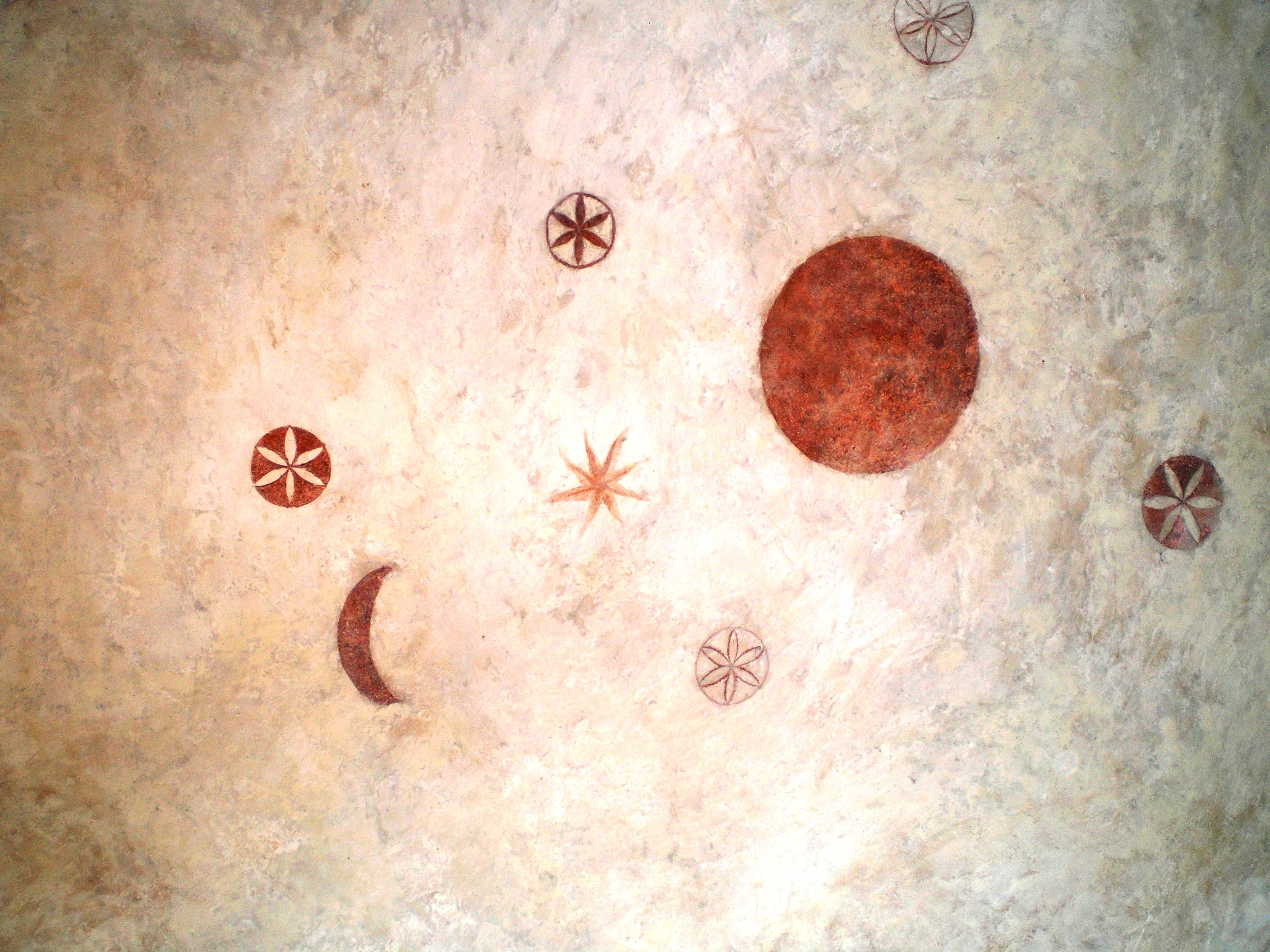
Frescoed vault

== See also ==
- History of religious life in Vicenza
- History of religious architecture in Vicenza

== Bibliography ==
- Various authors (1979a). La Basilica dei Santi Felice e Fortunato in Vicenza, Vol. I [The Basilica of Saints Felix and Fortunatus in Vicenza, Vol. I] (in Italian). Vicenza: Banca Popolare.
- Various authors (1979b). La Basilica dei Santi Felice e Fortunato in Vicenza, Vol. II [The Basilica of Saints Felix and Fortunatus in Vicenza, Vol. II] (in Italian). Vicenza: Banca Popolare.
- Barbieri, Franco; Cevese, Renato (2004). Vicenza, ritratto di una città [Vicenza, portrait of a city] (in Italian). Vicenza: Angelo Colla editore. ISBN 88-900990-7-0.
- Cracco, Giorgio (2009). Tra Venezia e Terraferma [Between Venice and the Mainland] (in Italian). Roma: Viella editore. ISBN 978-88-8334-396-4.
- Cracco Ruggini, Lelia (1988). Storia totale di una piccola città: Vicenza romana, in Storia di Vicenza, Vol. I [Complete history of a small city: Roman Vicenza, in History of Vicenza, Vol. I.] (in Italian). Vicenza: Neri Pozza editore.
- Mantese, Giovanni (1952). Memorie storiche della Chiesa vicentina, I, Dalle origini al Mille [Historical Memoirs of the Church of Vicenza, I, From the Origins to the Year 1000.] (in Italian). Vicenza: Accademia Olimpica.
- Mantese, Giovanni (1954a). Memorie storiche della Chiesa vicentina, II, Dal Mille al Milletrecento [Historical Memoirs of the Church of Vicenza, II, From the Year 1000 to the Year 1300.] (in Italian). Vicenza: Accademia Olimpica.
- Mantese, Giovanni (1958). Memorie storiche della Chiesa vicentina, III/1, Il Trecento [Historical Memoirs of the Church of Vicenza, III/1, The Fourteenth Century] (in Italian). Vicenza: Accademia Olimpica.
- Mantese, Giovanni (1964). Memorie storiche della Chiesa vicentina, III/2, Dal 1404 al 1563 [Historical Memoirs of the Church of Vicenza, III/2, From 1404 to 1563] (in Italian). Vicenza: Accademia Olimpica.
- Mantese, Giovanni (1974a). Memorie storiche della Chiesa vicentina, IV/1, Dal 1563 al 1700 [Historical Memoirs of the Church of Vicenza, IV/1, From 1563 to 1700] (in Italian). Vicenza: Accademia Olimpica.
- Mantese, Giovanni (1974b). Memorie storiche della Chiesa vicentina, IV/2, Dal 1563 al 1700 [Historical Memoirs of the Church of Vicenza, IV/2, From 1563 to 1700] (in Italian). Vicenza: Accademia Olimpica.
- Mantese, Giovanni (1982a). Memorie storiche della Chiesa vicentina, V/1, Dal 1700 al 1866 [Historical Memoirs of the Church of Vicenza, V/1, From 1700 to 1866] (in Italian). Vicenza: Accademia Olimpica.
- Mantese, Giovanni (1982b). Memorie storiche della Chiesa vicentina, V/2, Dal 1700 al 1866 [Historical Memoirs of the Church of Vicenza, V/2, From 1700 to 1866] (in Italian). Vicenza: Accademia Olimpica.
- Mantese, Giovanni (1954b). Memorie storiche della Chiesa vicentina, VI, Dal Risorgimento ai nostri giorni [Historical Memoirs of the Church of Vicenza, VI, From the Risorgimento to the Present Day] (in Italian). Vicenza: Scuola Tip. San Gaetano.

In-depth information

- Lorenzon, G. (1937). La Basilica dei SS. Felice e Fortunato in Vicenza [The Basilica of Saints Felix and Fortunatus in Vicenza] (in Italian).
- Previtali, Attilio (1979). Le origini del culto dei SS. Felice e Fortunato a Vicenza e la ricognizione archeologica al momento dell'invenzione delle reliquie [The origins of the cult of Saints Felix and Fortunatus in Vicenza and archaeological survey at the time of the discovery of the relics] (in Italian).
- Previtali, Attilio (1988). San Felice: una dimora dello spirito: Le simbologie di un antico monumento cristiano: la basilica e il martyrion dei ss. Felice e Fortunato in Vicenza [St. Felix: an abode of the spirit: The symbologies of an ancient Christian monument: the basilica and martyrion of Sts. Felix and Fortunatus in Vicenza] (in Italian).
- Previtali, Attilio (1991). I gioielli del Carpioni risplendono a S. Felice [Carpioni's jewels shine in S. Felice] (in Italian).
- Previtali, Attilio (1994). La Chiesa vicentina delle origini [The early church in Vicenza] (in Italian).
- Previtali, Attilio (1998). Gli esiti di un monumentale restauro [The results of a monumental restoration] (in Italian).
- Previtali, Attilio (2006). Basilica dei martiri Felice e Fortunato [Basilica of the Martyrs Felix and Fortunatus] (in Italian). Vicenza: Fondazione Monte di Pietà.
