= Sant'Eufemia, Verona =

Church in Verona, Italy

Coordinates: 45°26′35.40″N 10°59′36.52″E

Church of Santa Eufemia
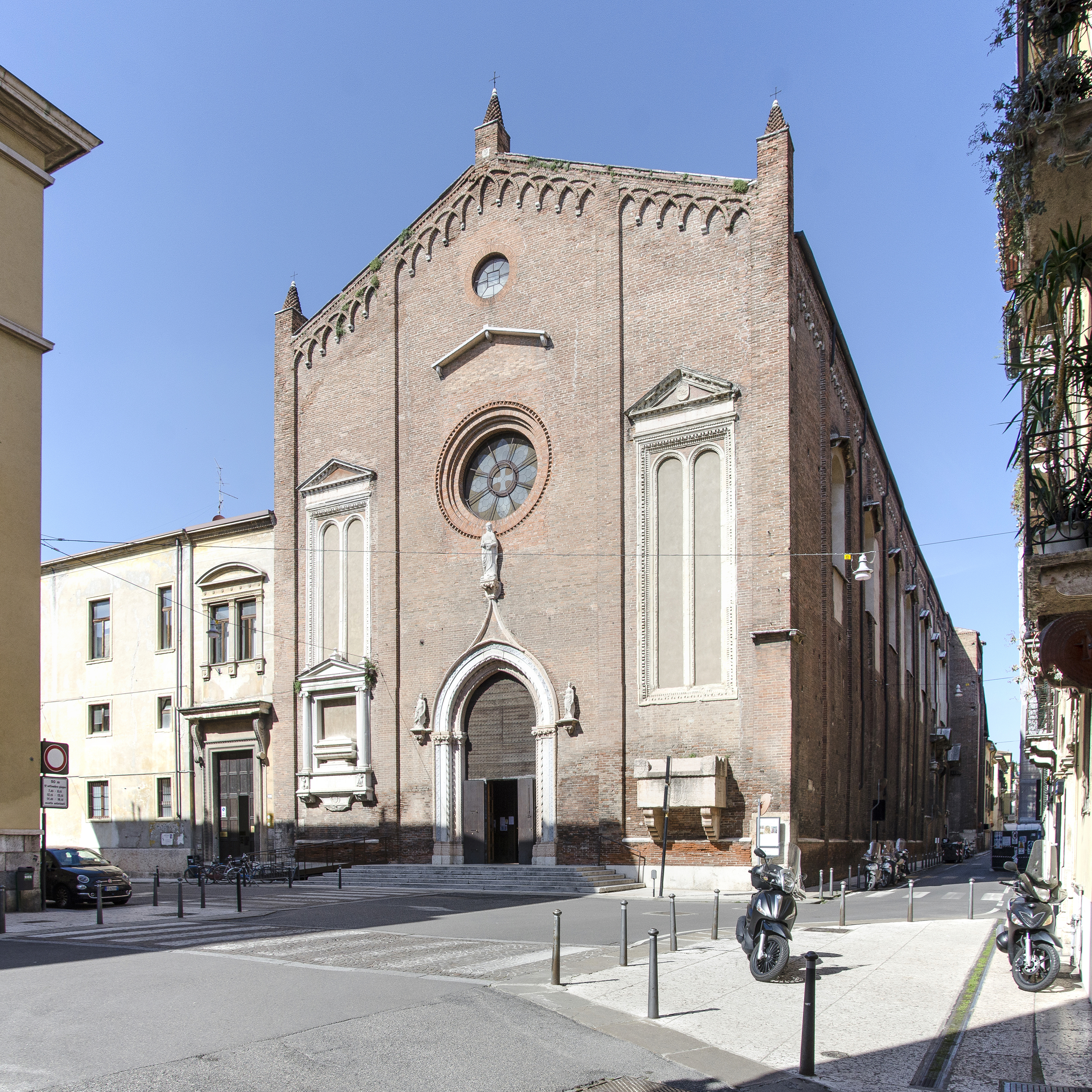
- Facade

Religion
- Affiliation: Roman Catholic
- Year consecrated: 1331

Location
- Location: Verona, Italy
- Interactive map of Church of Santa Eufemia

Architecture
- Type: Church
- Style: Gothic (exterior), Renaissance and Baroque (interior)
- Groundbreaking: 1275
- Completed: 14th century

The church of Sant'Eufemia is a Catholic place of worship located in the heart of Verona's historic center. It straddles an ancient Roman cardo, where a church building probably already existed in the 6th century. The foundation of the present church is owed to the Della Scala family, who brought Augustinian hermit monks to Verona in 1262 so that they could be closer to the community and granted them permission to build a monastery, located at the time in the Capitani quarter of the Scaliger city. Through bequests and donations, particularly that of Alberto della Scala, the building could be consecrated in 1331 by the bishop of Verona Nicolò. The building activity, however, did not end, and in the following years the monastery's rooms continued to be expanded in order to accommodate the increasing number of monks who arrived there attracted by the great prestige the community boasted. A permit granted by Mastino II della Scala in 1340 made it possible to further enlarge the church by building the vast apse that still distinguishes it today. From the end of the fourteenth century work continued on the various chapels and minor altars.

During the 18th century the building underwent several tamperings that affected the façade and the interior spaces, where a vaulted ceiling was made to hide the ancient trusses and a large arch dividing the chancel from the hall. These were also the years of decline for the monastery, already depopulated by the plague of 1630, culminating in the suppression ordered by Napoleon's troops who turned it into a military hospital. Reopened for worship under Austrian rule, it returned to serve as a garrison shelter during the Italian wars of independence. Restoration and consolidation of the building's masonry was put in place during the early 20th century; however, on April 25, 1945, the explosion of the nearby Victory Bridge, blown up by retreating German soldiers, severely damaged the facade; a large rose window was built to replace the 18th-century single-lancet window during reconstruction.

The vast interiors contain valuable works by several painters of the Veronese school, including: Giovan Francesco Caroto, Francesco Torbido, Il Moretto, Dionisio Battaglia, Battista del Moro, Paolo Farinati, Jacopo Ligozzi, Bernardino India, and Domenico and Felice Brusasorzi.

== History ==
=== Origins of the church ===
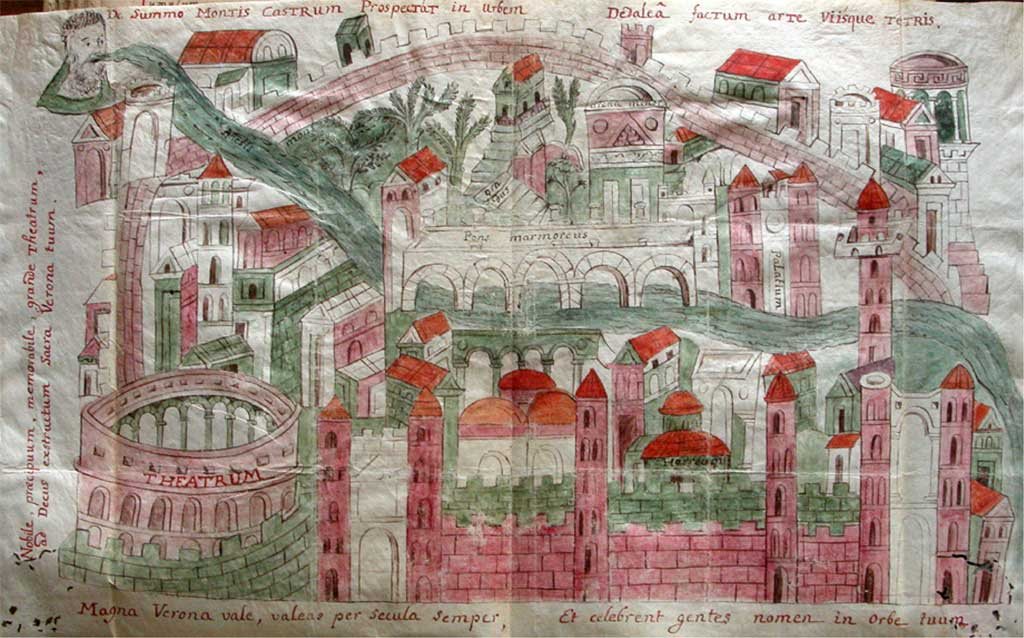
Raterian iconography, the oldest representation of Verona dating back to the 10th century, depicts the early church there

The first Christian church was built on this site before the mid-10th century, as it appears in the so-called “Raterian iconography,” the oldest depiction of Verona and dating from that period. Although no archaeological excavations have been conducted, it is believed that the church may date back to at least the 6th century and spanned a single block of the ancient Roman urban fabric. In 1117 Verona was hit by a devastating earthquake that destroyed or severely damaged its churches, not sparing St. Euphemia. The feverish reconstructive activity following the earthquake also affected this church, which was so promptly rebuilt that as early as 1140 it was reconsecrated as a parish. Sources or analyses do not reveal anything about this second building either, but it can be imagined to have been also modest in size and built in the Veronese Romanesque style, with the interior space divided into three naves, similar to the other religious buildings that were built in the Verona area at that time.

In late medieval Verona, Sant'Eufemia stood in the Capitani district and the contrada of the same name, which in the mid-13th century had about 500 souls. In the same years, just outside Verona there was already a community of Augustinian hermits who had arrived in the Ratherian period (late 10th century) and were offered to move to Sant'Eufemia (which had meanwhile fallen into such crisis that it was ruled by a single cleric named Zeno) in order to carry out their work of evangelization.

This was also made possible by the Della Scala family's seizure of power in Verona, which promoted a policy favorable to the church, encouraging the entry of various religious orders into the city. Thus, on September 16, 1262, it was possible, after a complex ceremony attended by clerics, the people and notaries, to formalize the full takeover of the monks, led by prior Friar Norandino, in place of the cleric Zeno. The first community that settled there, consisting of sixteen friars, found a complex situation: the church was in a poor state and the convent building was unsuitable for their living and office needs. However, from early on the Augustinians were able to benefit from aid from the ecclesiastical authorities, which resulted in donations, privileges and the power to confer indulgences. In addition, the church became a stationary church for Holy Week. On November 8, 1265, Bishop Manfredo of Verona gave permission to lay the foundation stone of the new building, which later, albeit with later modifications, would be the one that still exists today; at the same time, the bishop granted indulgences to anyone who contributed financially to the building.

=== The construction ===
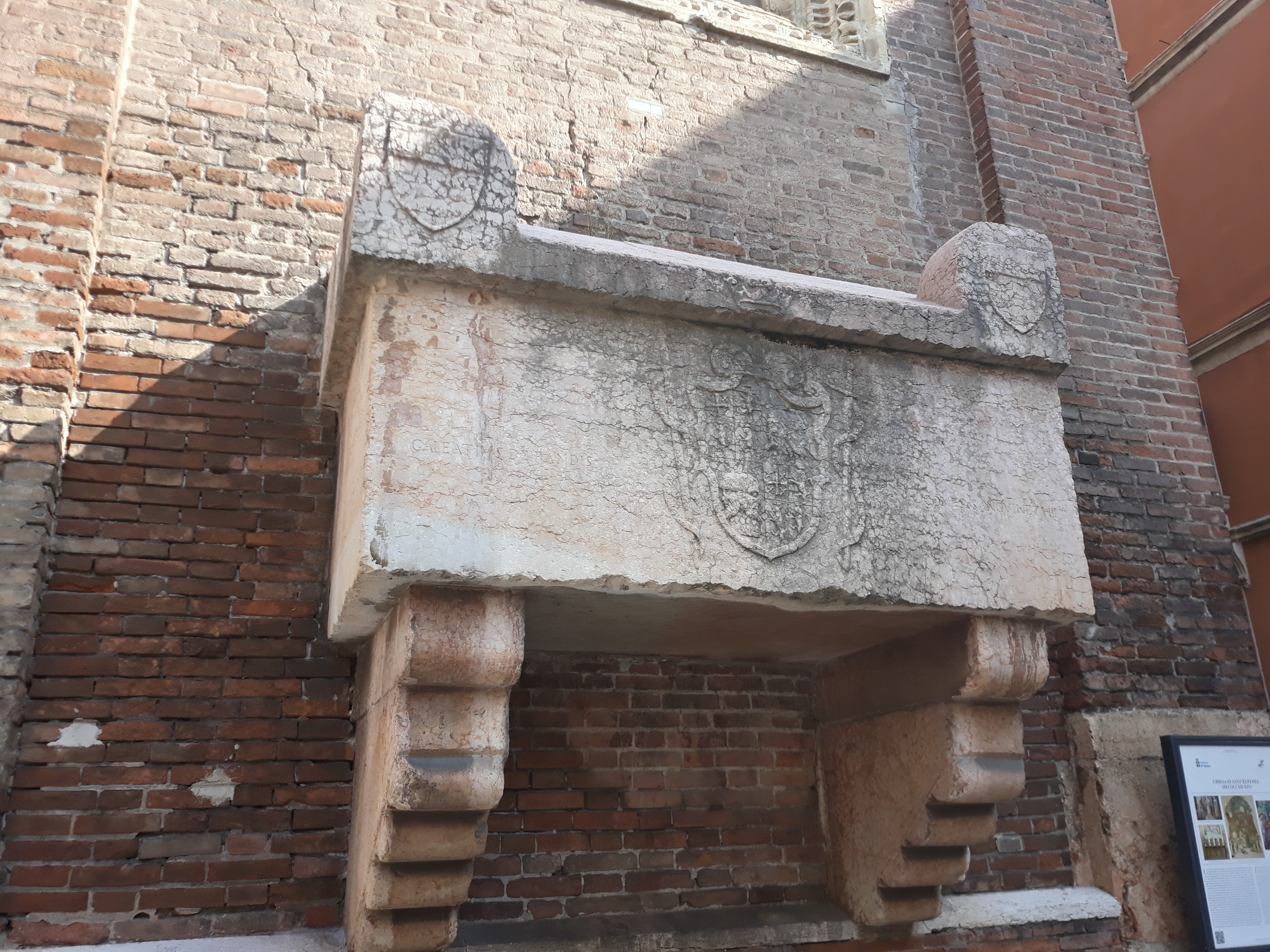
Sepulchre of the nobleman Cavalcano de' Cavalcani on the facade of the church

The start of construction was not immediate since in the following years the Augustinians had to obtain, through purchases and donations, the land on which the buildings destined for their cenobitic life, such as refectory, parlor and chapter house, would later be erected. Thus it had to wait ten years for the papal legate and bishop of Ferrara, Guglielmo, to give, on July 11, 1275, the second permit to begin construction. The foundation stone was laid the following August 7 in the presence of several witnesses and the imperial notary Bonzaninus filius quondam Ventai. The work had to proceed expeditiously and already in 1279 the facade must have been well underway since in the same year in his will the nobleman Cavalcano de' Cavalcani indicated with the words “... eligo sepulturam corporis mei positam in arca Ecclesie Sancte Euphemie penes portam magnam extra murum” that his mortal remains were to be kept in the ark placed on the facade itself. On March 3, 1284, the bishop of Verona Bartolomeo I della Scala blessed the cemetery that arose in front of the church, while on January 9, 1279, the altar dedicated to St. Ursula was consecrated.

At that time the Augustinians had to boast a high regard among the inhabitants of the city, from whom they received donations, privileges and aid, but it was the Della Scala family who were their greatest benefactors with Alberto leaving, in 1301, the considerable sum of 1,000 lire to each mendicant order present in the city so that, at least the Augustinians and Dominicans, could use them “... ad faciedum fieri Ecclesiam ipsorum fratrum solummodo expendedas...,” that is, for the buildings of their respective churches. In 1325, with a papal bull issued by Pope John XII, a number of Veronese citizens were excommunicated who were found guilty of offending the Augustinians, further proof of the prestige of the convent and the protection it was afforded by the ecclesiastical authority. Work proceeded for a few more years, and the church was finally consecrated in 1331 by Bishop Nicolò, abbot of the Villanova abbey.

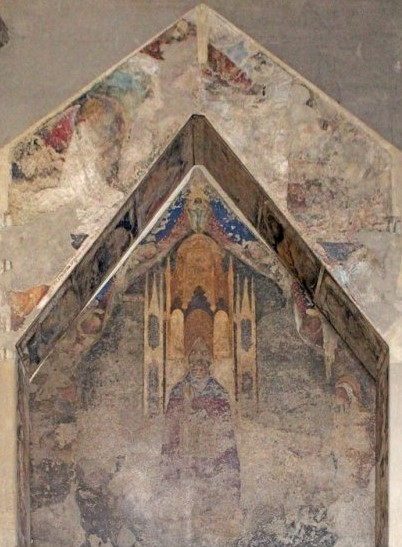
Fresco Glory of St. Augustine, a work by Stefano da Verona dating from around 1426, originally placed externally above the side portal and now in the interior

In the following years the rooms of the monastery dedicated to accommodation and studium had to be expanded, as the number of monks steadily increased, also due to the arrival of clerics from foreign countries. The cloister was renovated and its walls decorated with frescoes. It is not certain but it is believed that Dante Alighieri stayed in the monastery on January 20, 1320 on the occasion of his return to the city for an oral exposition of his work Quaestio de aqua et terra. In those years there were many Veronese citizens of various social backgrounds who asked to be buried in the church of Sant'Eufemia, where the bodies of the sons of Guido da Polenta also found rest.

A new permission, granted by Mastino II della Scala on July 19, 1340, allowed the Augustinian monks to close off a street that cut their property in two, so that they could unite it and thus complete the construction of the building that still lacked an apse. Cangrande II, who was assassinated by his brother on December 14, 1359, left a bequest to the Augustinians of 1,000 lire, the same amount that Diamante Dal Verme (wife of Giacomo Dal Verme) left in 1361 for the construction of the main chapel (later completed thanks to Jacopo Dal Verme), to which he added 60 for the altar frontal and 25 for the poor of the contrada assisted by the monks.

Towards the end of the 14th century, the construction of the various minor chapels continued. On September 24, 1390, a contract between Taddeo Spolverini Dal Verme and the monastery allowed the former to build the family chapel, later consecrated in 1396; Nicolò da Ferrara, who was later the executor, also participated in the signing as a witness. It is probable that between the end of the 14th century and the beginning of the following century the bell tower had already been completed, at least in part. In the following years the interior of the church was decorated and enriched while, in 1476, the jurist Cristoforo Lanfranchini commissioned a new portal in late Gothic style to replace the previous one considered very modest in relation to the new church.

=== Late Renaissance embellishments ===
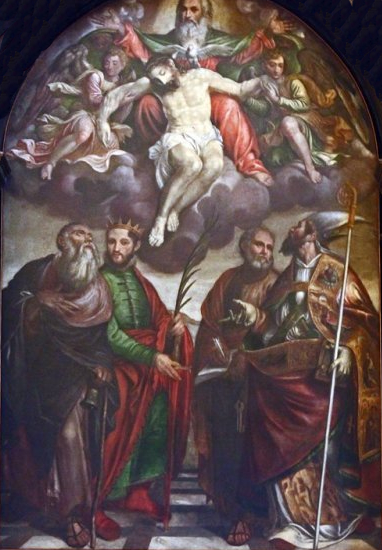
Altarpiece by Jacopo Ligozzi (c. 1577) depicting the Holy Trinity.

Throughout the 16th century the church underwent intense embellishment of its interior in accordance with late Renaissance trends. In the first decades of the century, the sacristy was restored and the high altar was decorated, which was embellished with three bronze panels by the Trentino sculptor Andrea Briosco, known as Il Riccio, no longer present in the church (in their place there are imitations today) because they were subject to Napoleonic confiscations. A great many artists of the Veronese school of painting made their contributions in the creation of canvases and altarpieces displayed inside, among them were Giovan Francesco Caroto, Francesco Torbido, Il Moretto, Dionisio Battaglia, Battista del Moro, Paolo Farinati, Jacopo Ligozzi, Bernardino India, and Domenico and Felice Brusasorzi.

On February 26, 1601, Bishop Agostino Valier allowed the Augustinians to place a baptismal font inside the church, an uncommon privilege made possible thanks to the donation of Count Galeazzo Banda. In addition, it was arranged that not only residents of the old parish jurisdiction would be baptized but anyone who requested it.

The following year, in accordance with the Counter-Reformation directions following the Council of Trent, the interior was remodeled, and in particular the old rood screen separating the nave from the chancel was removed, as it was no longer suitable for the new arrangements. Later a new cloister was also built, replacing the one built in the 14th century. In 1617 it was already under construction according to a plan that intended it to be of imposing dimensions, so much so that the friars wrote that “a cloister of such size and beautiful architecture that will have few equals in Italy” was being built.

In these years the monastery could boast the presence of as many as 50 friars supported by an annual income of 1,000 ducats. The plague of 1630 also struck Verona, killing three-fifths of the population, and in the district of Santa Eufemia alone 438 people died out of the 656 who lived there before the outbreak of the epidemic. Having overcome the scourge of the plague, at the end of the 18th century the church was provided with a new high altar, later sold in 1836 to the Pinzolo parish church, made in 1694 by Giovanni Battista Ranghieri with sculptures by Domenico Aglio and paintings by Pietro Ronchi.

=== From the beginning of decadence to the present ===
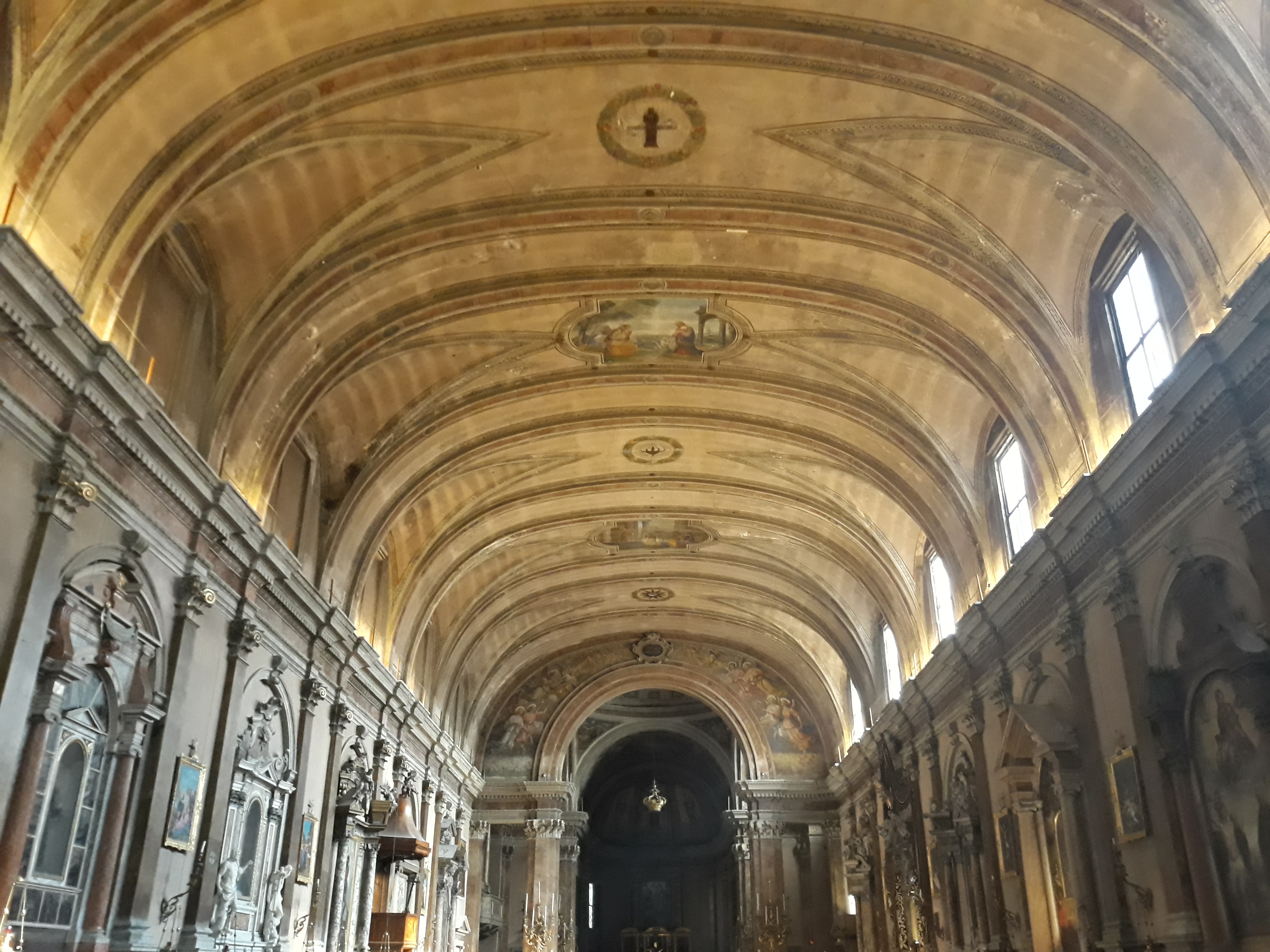
Barrel vault on the ceiling and large arch between the nave and chancel, some of the major works carried out in the 18th century

The 18th century was also marked by intense works that changed the physiognomy of the church. The professed layman Friar Pellegrino Mosconi was commissioned in 1739 to take charge of these renovations, which involved the interior and exterior of the building. The most important intervention carried out on the interior involved the ceiling where a barrel vault was created so large that it covered the entire nave, and hid the ancient wooden trusses. On the right side the fourteenth-century windows were bricked in and replaced with simple rectangular openings. A large central single-lancet window was opened on the facade to allow greater illumination of the interior spaces, and at the same time the two pre-existing ones were closed. In the same years a stone statue depicting the Madonna was removed from the interior to be relocated to Dossobuono. Some sarcophagi and sepulchral slabs that were on the walls of the naves were moved outside to the first cloister, while the Lavagnoli and Cavalcanti sepulchres were walled up on the facade.

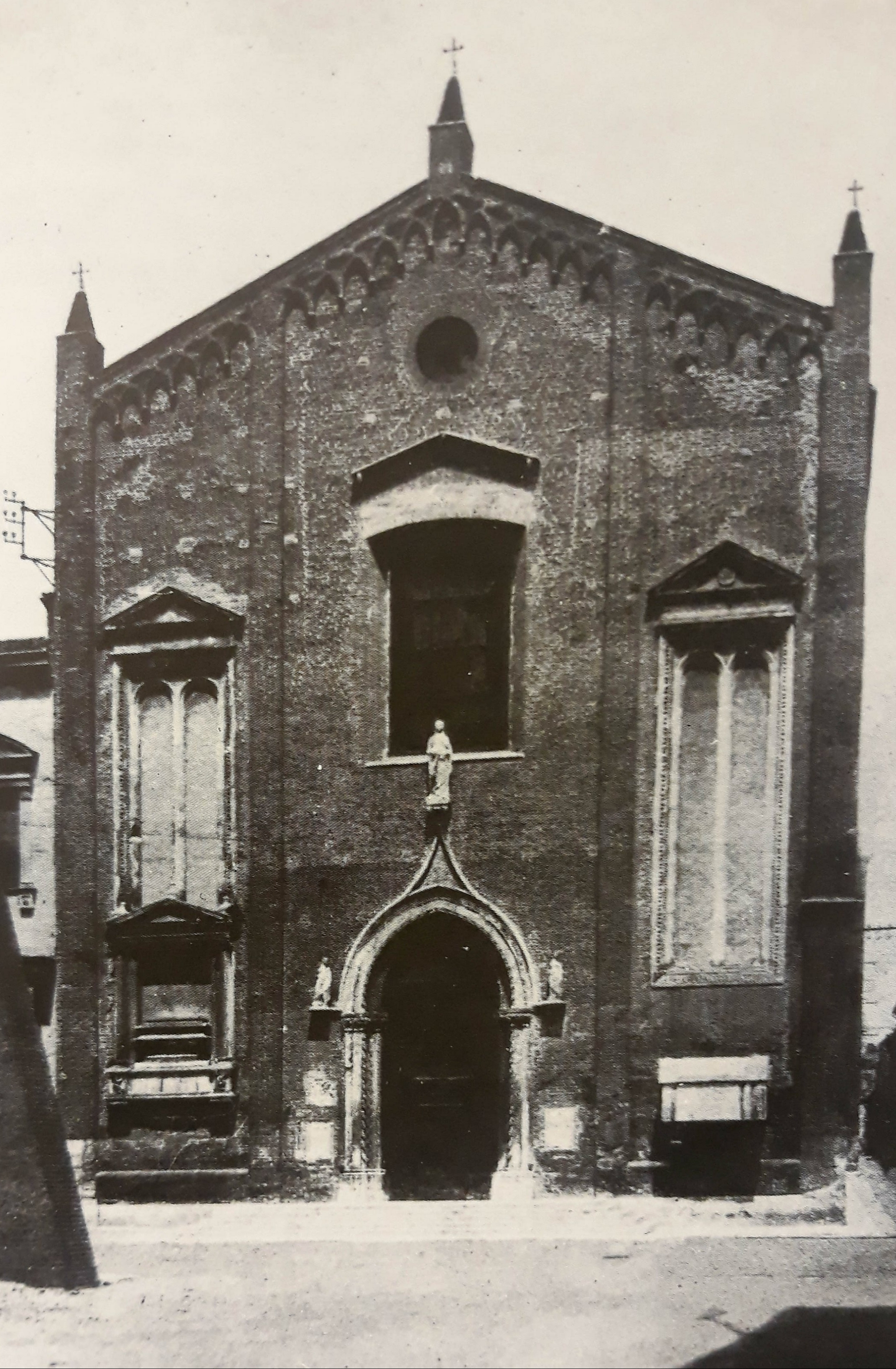
The church of Santa Eufemia as it looked in 1938. Note the large central eighteenth-century window, replaced in 1945 by a rose window.

The first half of the eighteenth century is not only remembered in the history of the church for these transformations but also for being the period of the beginning of the decline of the monastery. The number of resident friars declined steadily, so that while in 1756 there could be counted 34, in 1780 there were only 22 until, fifteen years later, there were only 12. The arrival of Napoleon's troops was the final blow that disgraced the convent: in fact, the French imposed the closure of religious activities in order to turn the church into a military hospital, but not before emptying it of all its furnishings. Shortly afterwards a fire destroyed many of the artworks kept there, including canvases by Balestra, Ridolfi, Giolfino and Brusasorzi. During the Veronese Easter of 1797 the church was attacked by a group of rioters who looted and plundered it, despite attempts by the prior of the convent to dissuade them; the action ended in bloodshed with deaths and injuries. In 1798, following some renovations, it could be reopened for worship.

An overall reorganization of the diocese of Verona led Santa Eufemia, in 1806, to be elevated to a matrix church absorbing, as a result, other neighboring parishes; this increased the number of faithful from 570 to nearly 2,500. A subsequent decree imposed the suppression of all religious orders, and even the Augustinians had to leave the already reduced part of the convent they had been granted in 1806.

In the following years, while Verona was under Austrian domination, some changes were made to the interior of the church, such as the removal of two small altars that were on either side of the main entrance, the displacement of the altars of St. Augustine and the Pieta, and the replacement of the high altar (brought, as already mentioned, to Pinzolo). In 1845 the interior lighting was renewed with new lamps and candelabra. During the three Italian wars of independence (1848, 1859, 1866) it was closed to worship and used again as a military hospital.

During that period there were few changes to the structure of the church except for the construction of a large arch between the chancel and the nave, with the function of mitigating the perception of excessive length. Restoration and consolidation of the building's masonry was put in place in the 20th century. On April 25, 1945, the explosion of the nearby Victory Bridge, blown up by retreating German soldiers at the end of World War II, severely damaged the church's facade. In the same year it was promptly restored, opting, however, to replace the large central eighteenth-century single lancet window with a rose window that would give the building its original medieval appearance.

== Description ==
=== Exterior ===
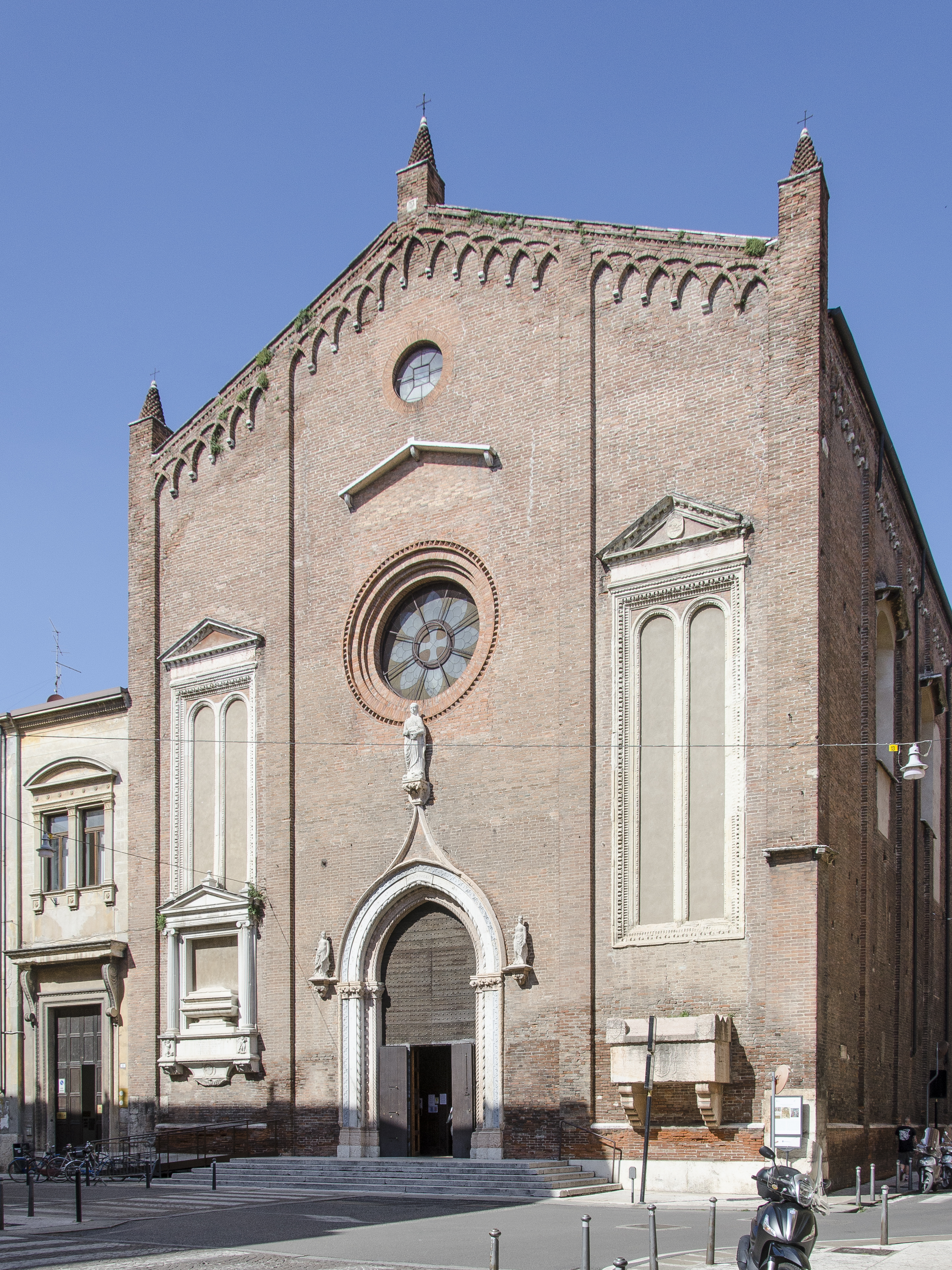
Church façade

The church has a gabled facade facing southwest and made of brick. The entrance, which is preceded by a white stone staircase, consists of a portal with a pointed arch and splayed imposts, and is crowned by a statue depicting St. Euphemia. Above and in axis with the portal is a large oculus with a terracotta ferrule and protected by a double sloping white stone, and above this is a second, smaller oculus. On either side of the portal, above corbels decorated with carved foliage, are two statues probably depicting warrior saints who originally must have been equipped with a sword or lance and holding a shield adorned with the three stars of the Lanfranchini army. On the top of the portal is drawn an inflected cornice on which, at the upper end, is placed a statue of the titular saint of the church, depicted with a book in her hand and lions at her feet, as per traditional iconography. On either side of the portal are two blind mullioned windows with a tympanum. The façade concludes with an eaves decorated with Lombard bands and is crowned by three pinnacles, also made of brick.

There are also two funerary monuments on the facade: the first placed under the left mullioned window was made in 1550 for the Lavagnoli family, and initially placed inside, it was moved outside in the eighteenth century. The second, on the other hand, dates back to 1279 and is placed under the right mullioned window; it consists of a red Verona marble ark and belonged to Cavalcano dei Cavalcani but later passed to the Banda counts.

The side elevations are still in brick but marked by pilasters set on a high plinth, finally crowned by hanging arches; between the pilasters, moreover, there is a theory of wide, low arched windows with splayed intrados, which illuminate the space of the inner hall. The image of the polygonal development of the apse and side chapels (lit by tall ogival windows) is reinforced by angular pilasters. Along the southern elevation is a side entrance composed of a portal with molded piers and architrave in light-colored stone. Above the small entrance is a cusped niche inside which originally stood the fresco Glory of St. Augustine by Stefano da Verona, now detached and preserved in the chapel of St. Rita inside the church.

As on the facade, there are also two valuable funerary monuments on the right side, originally placed inside and placed here in the 18th century. The one closest to the facade is also the smallest and consists of a marble sarcophagus on which is placed a statue of fine workmanship, albeit mutilated. Next there is the cenotaph of the Verità family, made in 1566, the elegance of which has suggested that the design may have belonged to the Veronese painter Paolo Farinati.

==== Bell tower ====
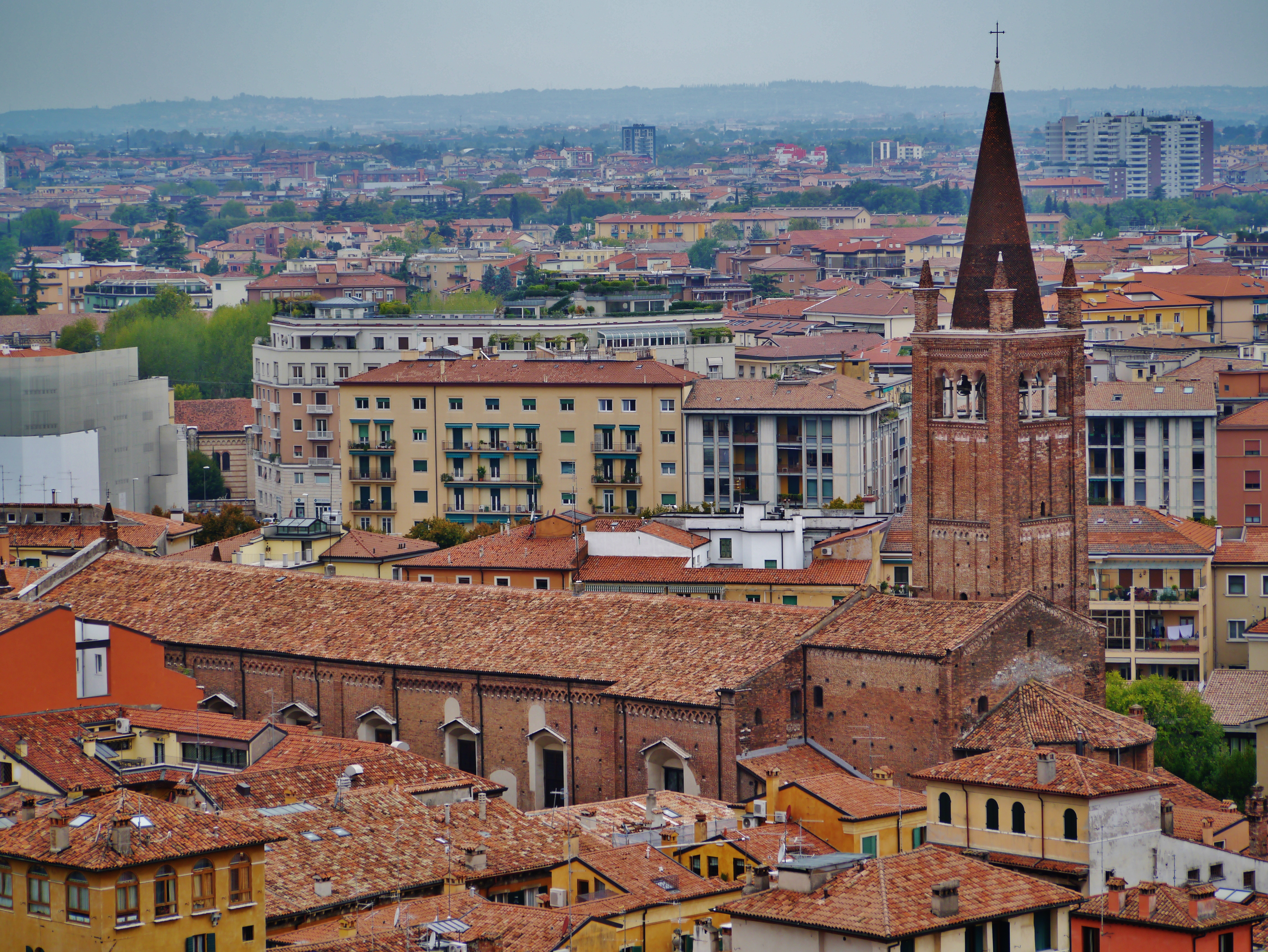
Church bell tower

The bell tower, leaning against the left side of the chancel, has a square base and a massive brick shaft made of terracotta bricks. Three-mullioned windows open into the belfry, surmounted by a conical roof and four pinnacles.

As for the original bronze ensemble, there is no documentation, and all that is known is that it consisted of four bells. These were replaced in 1886: in that year, in fact, the city of Verona was struck by a cholera epidemic, so the parishioners made a vow to the Blessed Virgin Mary of Health, venerated in St. Euphemia; since no cases occurred in the parish, the faithful decided to thank the Virgin by donating the renewal of the bell concert to the church. The work was commissioned to the Verona firm of the Cavadini family, which cast a set of five bells in the major scale of F3, consecrated on November 12, 1886, by Cardinal and Bishop of Verona Luigi di Canossa. These were joined in 1949 by a sixth bell, also cast by the Cavadinis. A few years after the installation of the first five bronzes, a society of Veronese bell ringers was also founded, later reuniting with the oldest group in the church of San Giorgio in Braida.

==== Cloister ====
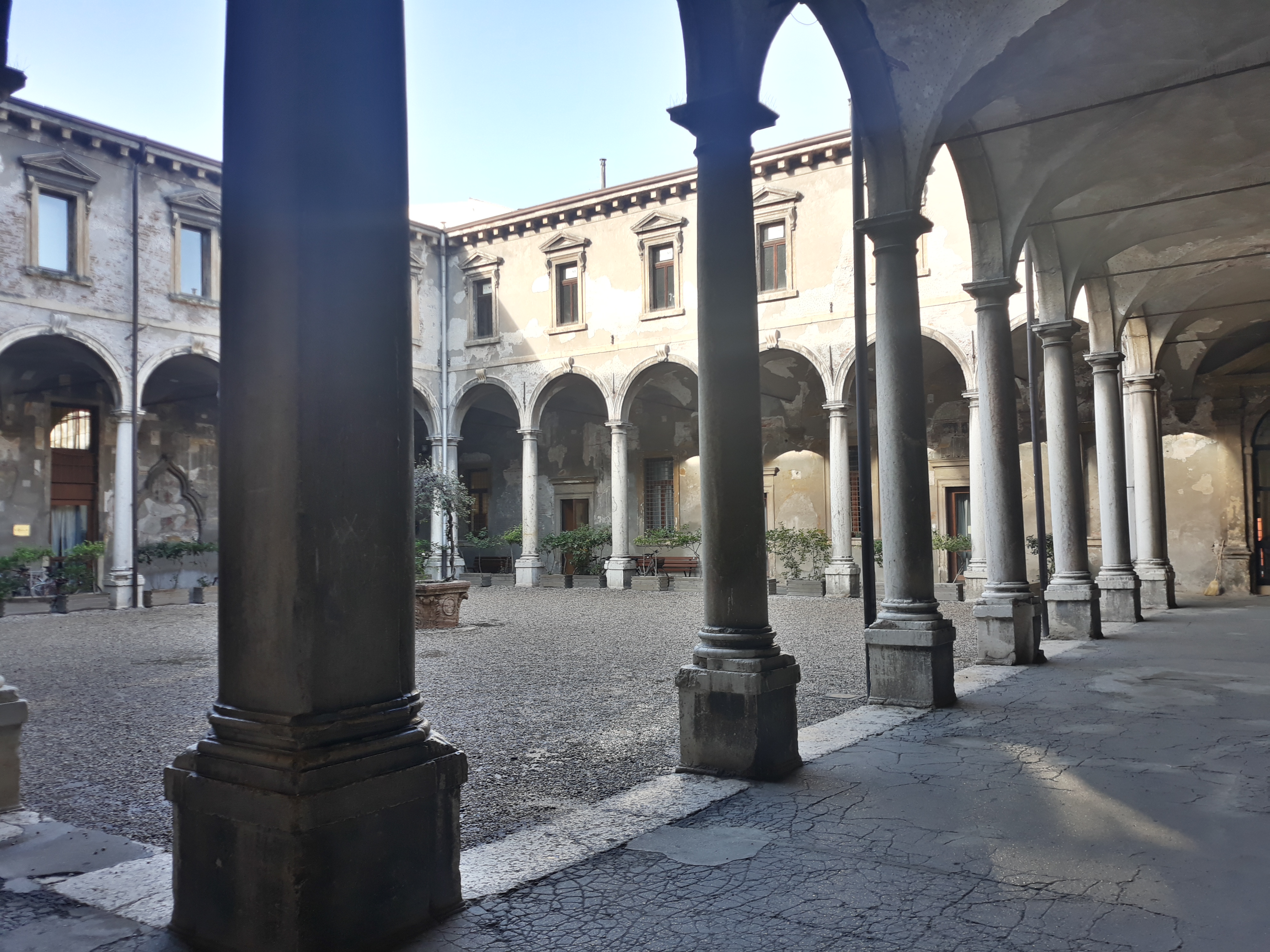
Cloister of the ancient monastery

It is possible to date the construction of the present cloister, adjacent to the church, to 1617, due to the discovery of a coeval document that records that the monks “... are building a cloister of such size and beautiful architecture that will have few equals in Italy.” Its design is the work of the architect Domenico Curtoni, already the author of very important works in the city, who chose to move towards a purely classical layout construction, inspired by the works of the famous Michele Sanmicheli, but inserting new elements and favoring a certain play of light between the upper light and the lower dark.

The cloister is characterized by a succession of round arches, supported by tall columns and capitals of Tuscan order. Centrally on the intrados of the arches are embossed the coats of arms of the monastery's benefactor families who supported the work for its construction. Above the arches, a string-course cornice initiates the upper order consisting of a solid wall on which windows with a tympanum set at the lower compartments open.

In the 17th century the painter Bernardino Muttoni was commissioned to fresco the lunettes of the arches with Episodes from the Life of St. Augustine, as was customary in cloisters of the time, but no trace of these paintings is now preserved. In the center of the cloister there is a puteal dating from 1533, the four faces of which are decorated on the corners with acanthus leaves on which are engraved the words “Ave Maria” and the christogram “IHS.”

=== Interior ===
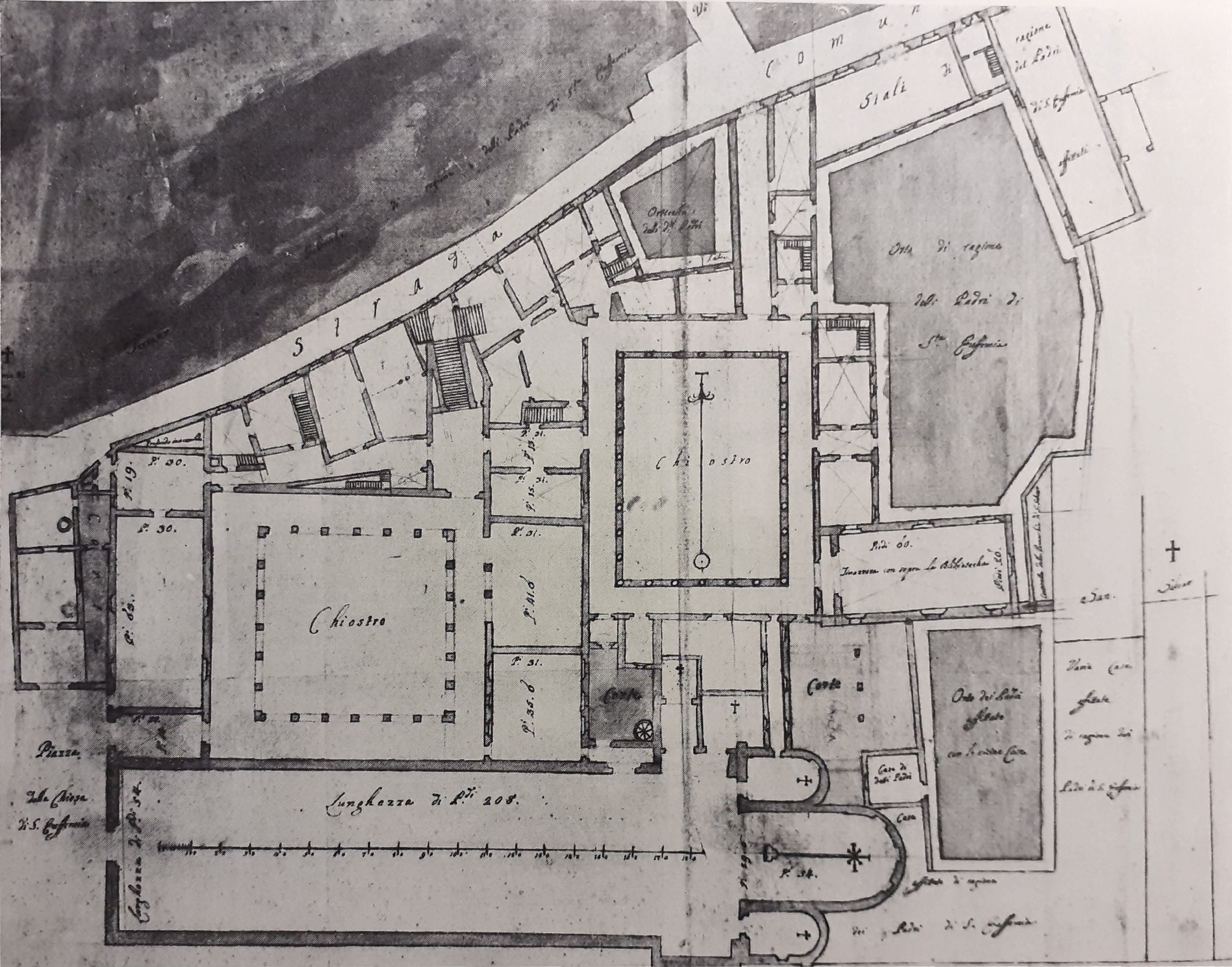
Floor plan of the church and outbuildings (18th or 19th century)

The plan of the church has a single hall and is markedly longitudinal, with a transept endowed with arms of particularly shallow depth and a chancel raised two steps above the rest of the space, terminating in a five-sided, polygonal development apse. The hall is covered by a barrel vault with a semi-elliptical cross-section, made of wattle anchored to the trusses above by means of wooden ribs, punctuated by transverse ribs and lateral webs at the windows, just as the lowered hemispherical canopy covering the transept cross is in wattle. In masonry, on the other hand, is the barrel-vaulted ceiling of the chancel. The pictorial decorations of the vaults were made in the 1930s by Gaetano Miolato, and consist of: polychrome frames, liturgical symbols and three paintings depicting the Nativity, the Annunciation and the Presentation of Mary in the Temple on the vault covering of the nave; a coffered motif with a central rosette and the Four Prophets in the pendentives, in the transept cross vault covering; coffered decoration and a Last Supper in the chancel covering; a Sacred Heart of Jesus and four Saints in the five segments of the apse basin.

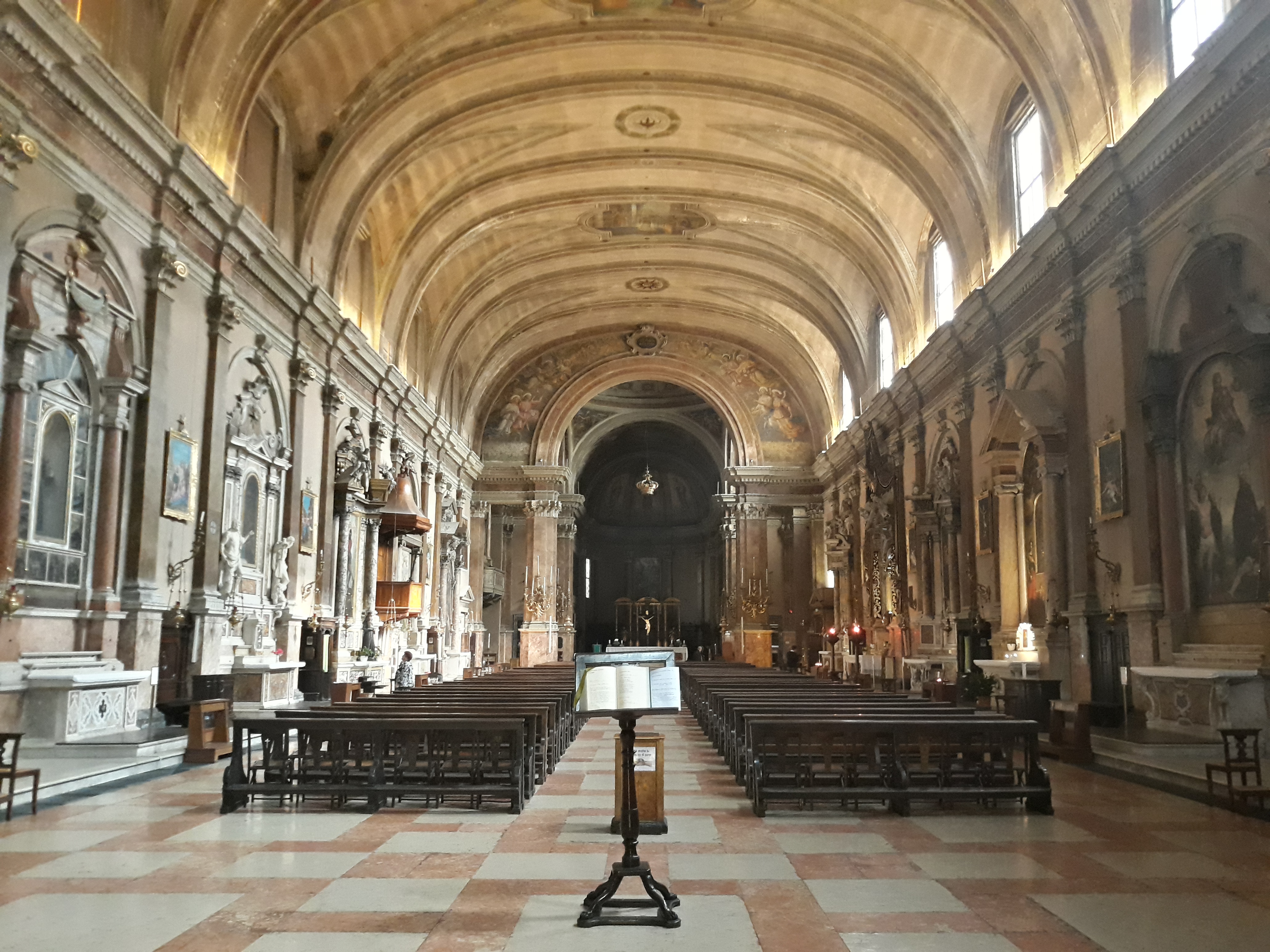
Interior of the church

The sides of the hall are marked by a series of pilasters of composite order set on a high plinth and supporting the top entablature, between which are fourteen altars, seven on each side; in the transept, separated from the nave by a Serlian window on pillars on which is painted a choir of angels, is an additional altar dedicated to the Blessed Sacrament, in the right arm, and the baptistery, in the left arm. Finally, on the left of the chancel is the chapel of St. Rita, also known as St. Augustine's, and on the right is the Spolverini Dal Verme chapel, or Chapel of the Angels.

The space is accessible from the main entrance located along the façade, via a wooden door above which is a detached fresco, in which a young Battista del Moro depicted St. Paul at the feet of Ananias, formerly placed on the fifth altar to the south, or from a side entrance located along the right side.

==== Right side of the nave ====
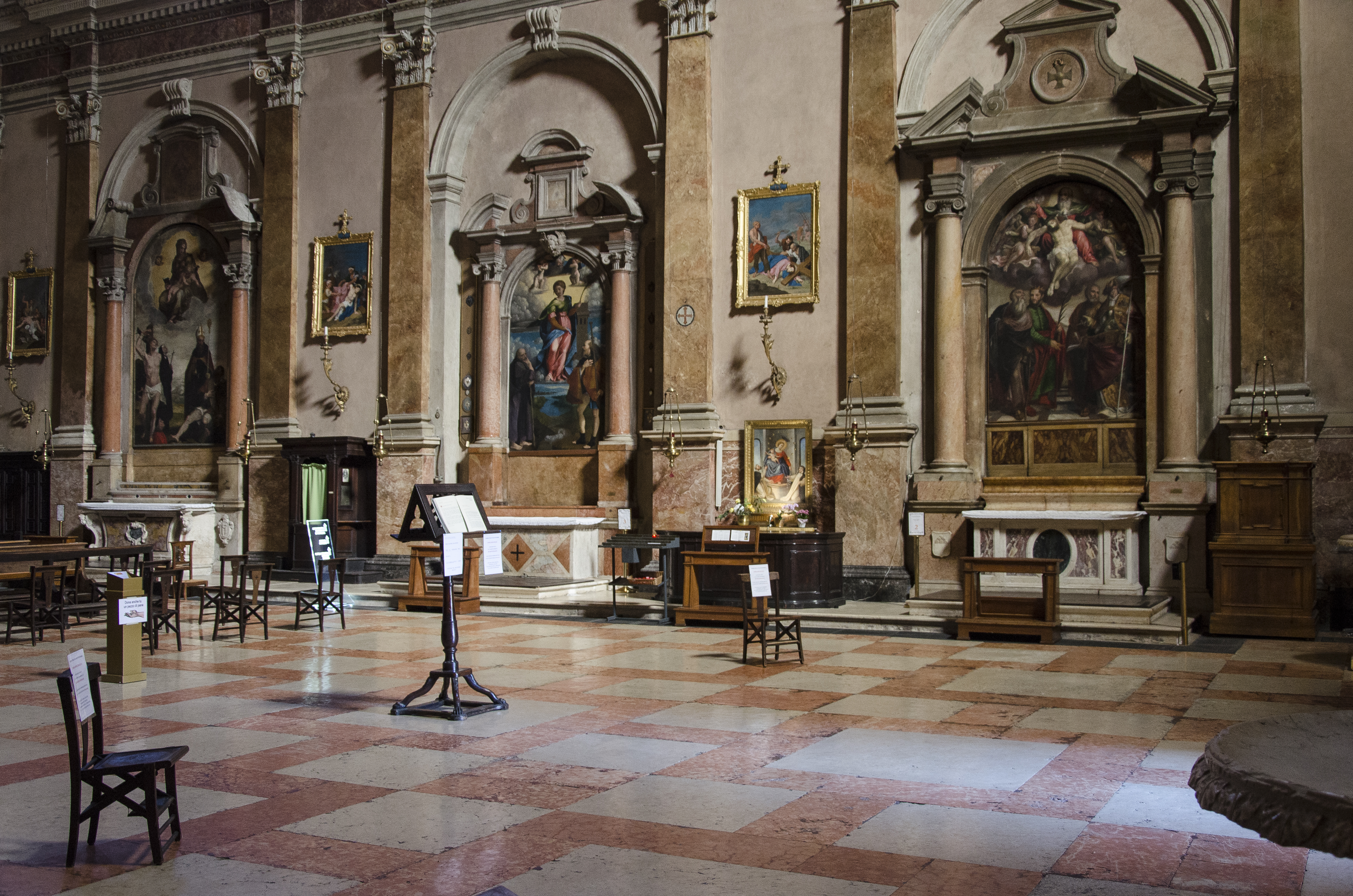
Right side of the nave

As soon as one enters, on the right side of the nave, hangs a painting of a Magdalene in seventeenth-century style, a late work by Giulio Carpioni, of which there are records in the church only from the beginning of the nineteenth century. Next one encounters seven altars made in various periods and at their end the side entranceway, above which is another painting by Carpioni depicting a penitent Saint Jerome.

The first altar on the right side was built by the Lavagnoli family in the late 16th century. The altarpiece is by the painter Jacopo Ligozzi in which he painted a Trinity with Saints Anthony Abbot, Louis, King of France, Peter and Augustine shortly before 1577. The work is in the Renaissance style but with some features characteristic of Counter-Reformation art. The base of the columns bears the coats of arms of the commissioning family.

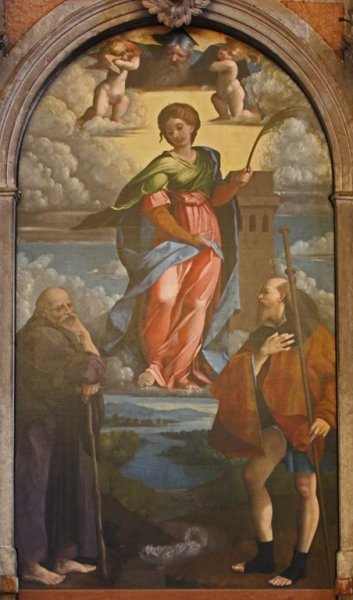
Saint Barbara and Saints Anthony Abbot and Roch by Francesco Torbido

The next altar, made of alternating red and white marble, also dates from the late 16th century. Its altarpiece, depicting Saint Barbara and Saints Anthony Abbot and Roch, was made by Francesco Torbido at an advanced age. Giorgio Vasari mentions the canvas telling that it was originally made for the Bombardieri chapel. In addition, it is known that it was also originally enriched with a predella, which has now disappeared with the frame, in which some scenes of the saint's martyrdom were depicted.

The third altar was built in the second half of the 16th century but underwent extensive remodeling during the 18th century. The Veronese painter Domenico Brusasorzi is the author of the altarpiece in which he depicted, between 1540 and 1550, Our Lady and Saints Sebastian, Monica, Augustine and Roch. As was the custom at the time, Brusasorzi inserted the portrait of the patrons in the center of the lower part of the canvas. The altar was commissioned by the Da Cerea nobles whose noble arms are depicted on the sides of the mensa.

In the center of the next altar, the fourth, there is placed inside a niche a wooden sculpture depicting a Madonna of the Girdle, a work from the early 19th century. Giovanni Caliari is the author of the canvas placed around the niche in 1834 depicting Saints Joseph, Anna, Euphemia and Teresa. The altar reredos was made in the 16th century using red marble from Verona.

The fifth altar was made in 1736 on a commission from the Pistori guild. It is characterized by the use of a multiplicity of marbles. In the center is an eighteenth-century style canvas depicting St. Paul between Saints Anthony Abbot and Ursula, whose author, Agostino Ugolini, proceeded to sign and date it “AUGUS. UGOLINI P. 1800."

Continuing on, one encounters the altar dedicated to Our Lady of Health, made in 1596 on a commission from the Trevisoli family as attested by the engravings on the sides of the mensa. The statue was one of the most venerated in the city and was moved to St. Euphemia only on February 20, 1807, coming from another church suppressed during the Napoleonic occupation. Originally placed here was a painting by Felice Brusasorzi that no longer exists.

The most architecturally remarkable altar, partly because of the use of yellow marble from Torri del Benaco, is the seventh, dedicated to Thomas of Villanova, an Augustinian saint. Made around the middle of the 18th century, it features an interesting tabernacle adorned with three statuettes, the work of Diomirio Cignaroli, depicting St. Joseph and two cherubs; originally there was also a small door painted by Felice Cignaroli that was stolen in August 1991. The altar canvas, Virgin and St. Thomas of Villanova was painted by Giambettino Cignaroli in about 1768. Gian Domenico Cignaroli, on the other hand, is the author of the painting to the right of the altar with Madonna, St. Andrew, St. Lawrence and the Souls in Purgatory, while Fabrizio Cartolari painted the one on the left with St. Thomas of Villanova distributing alms to the poor.

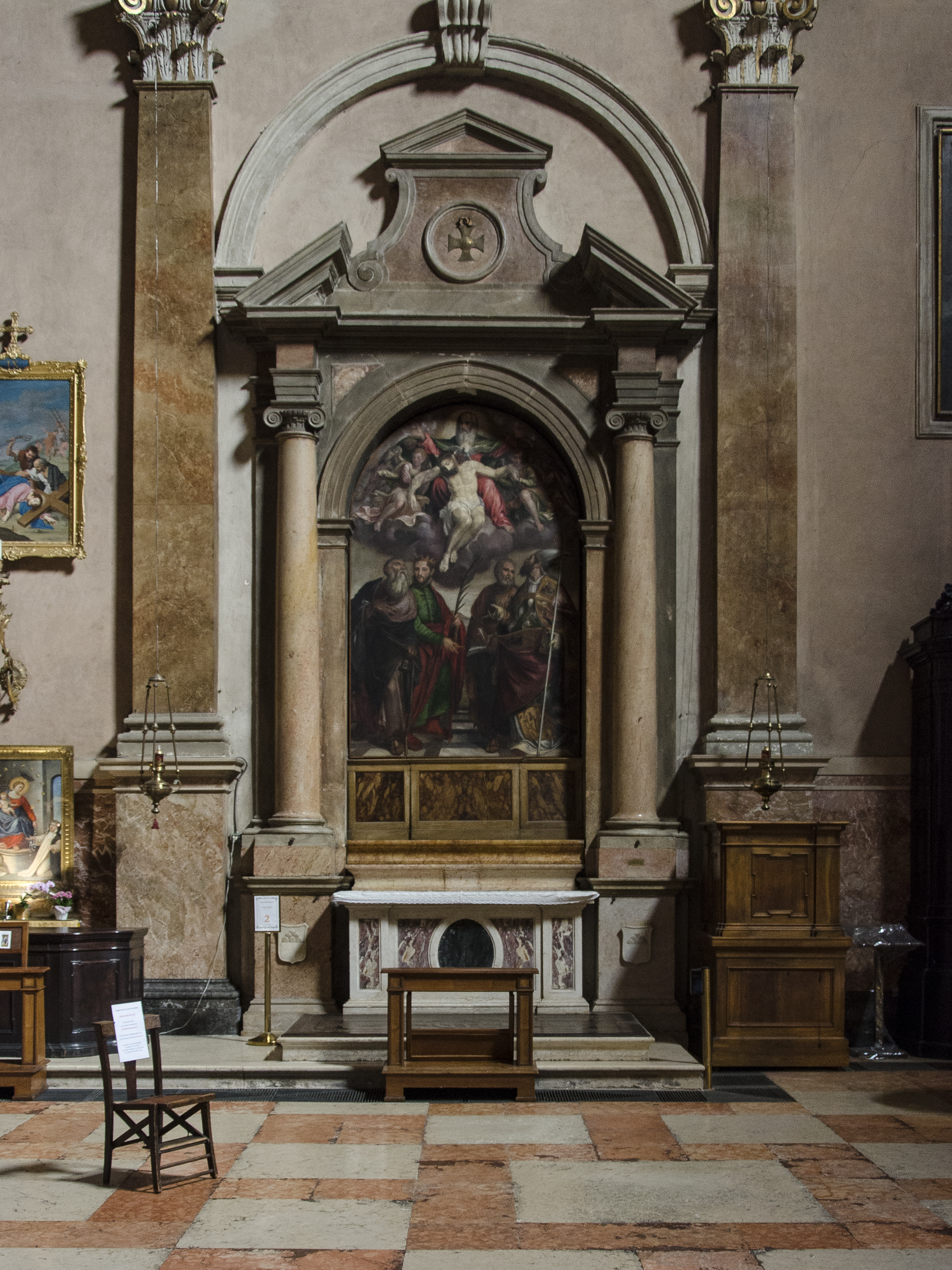
First altar on the right, starting from the entrance

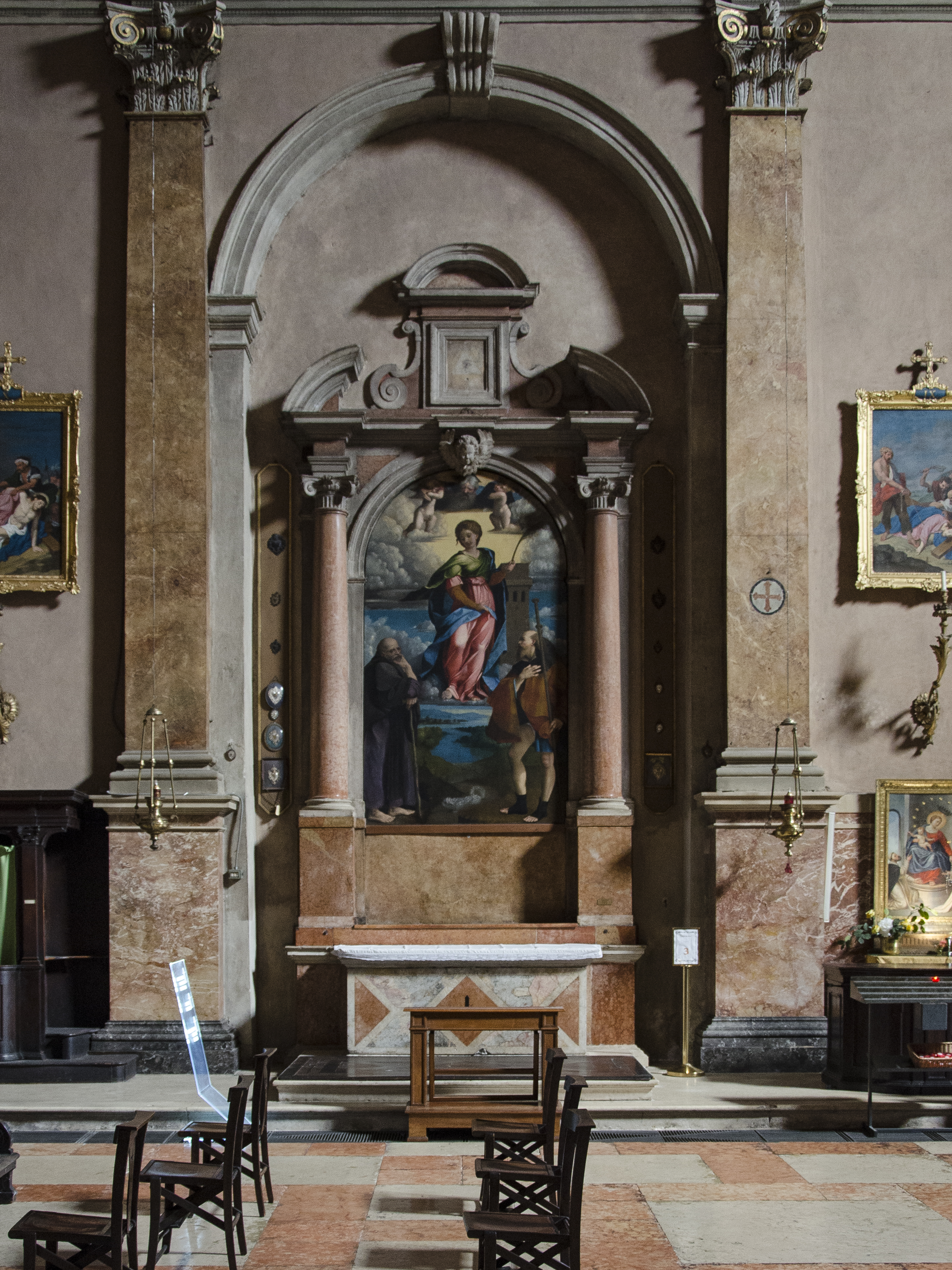
Second altar

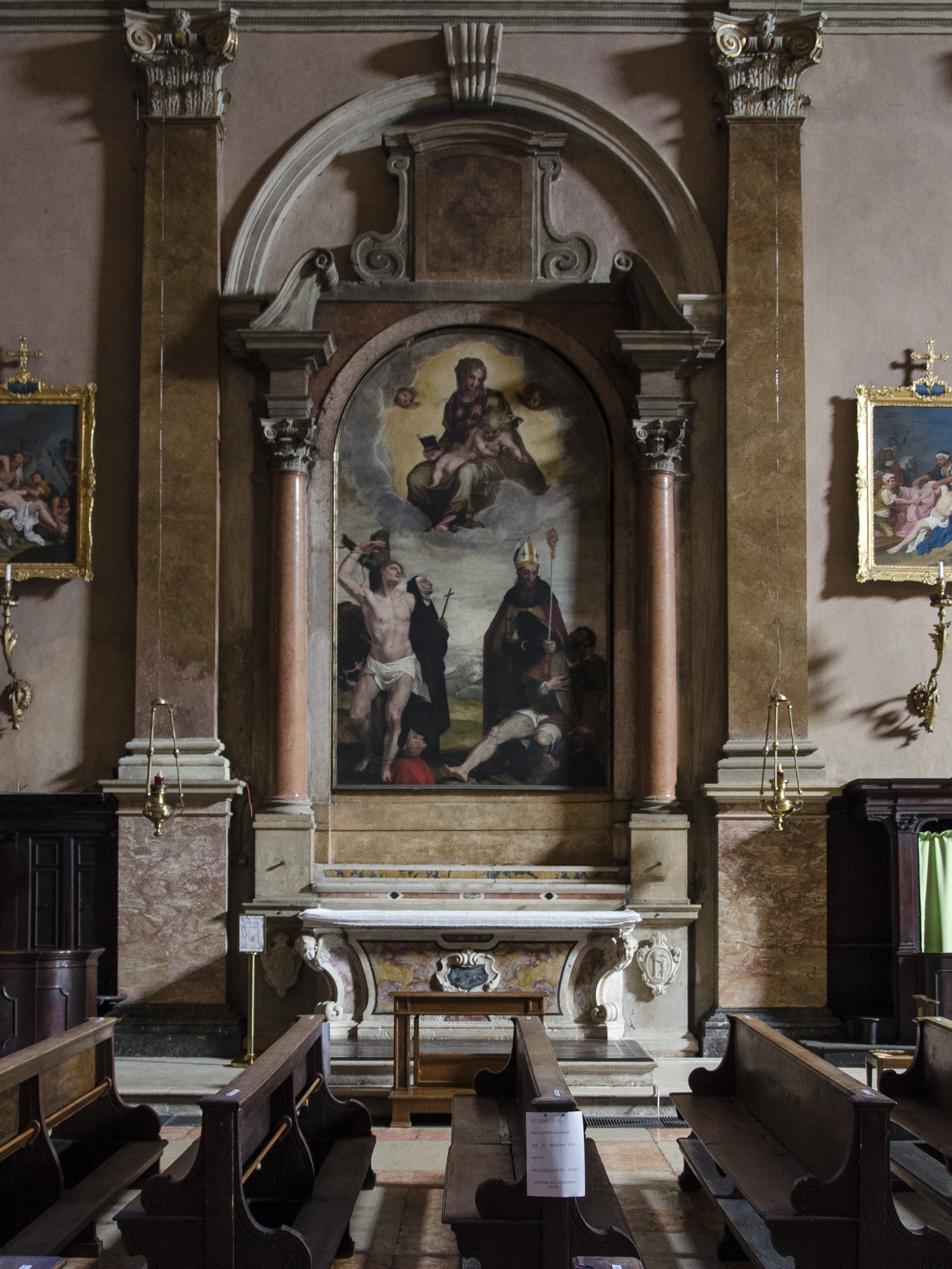
Third altar

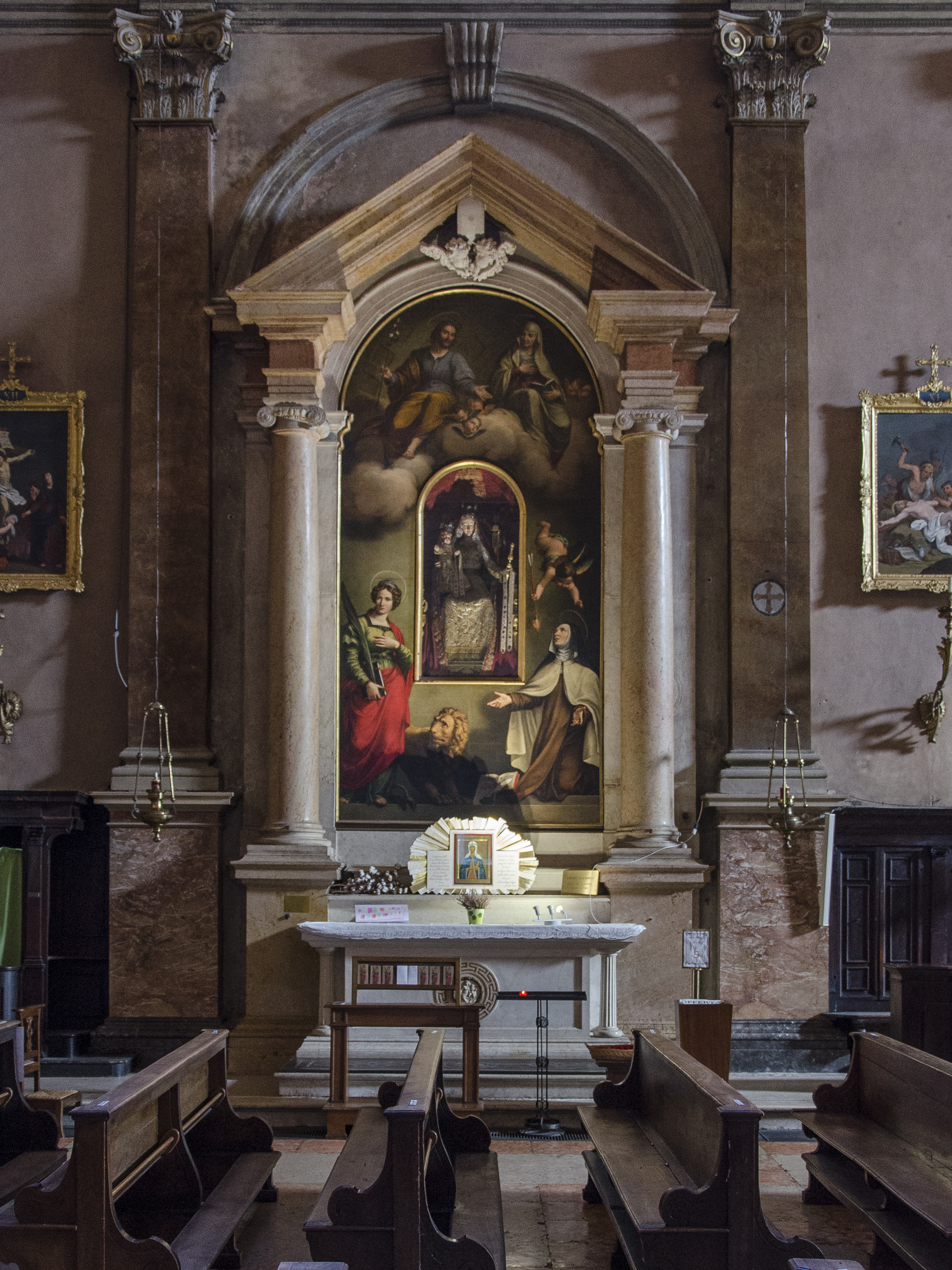
Fourth altar

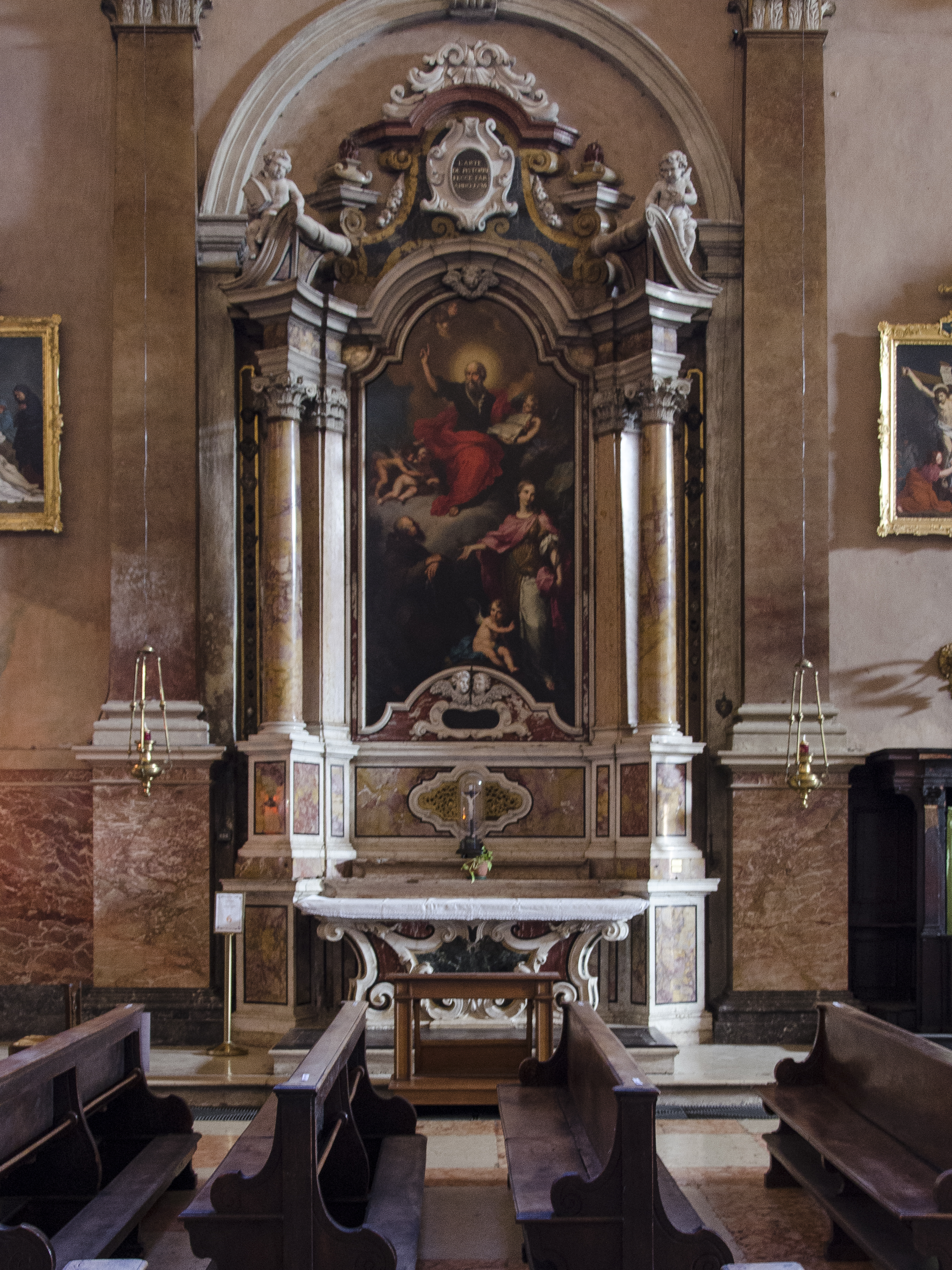
Fifth altar

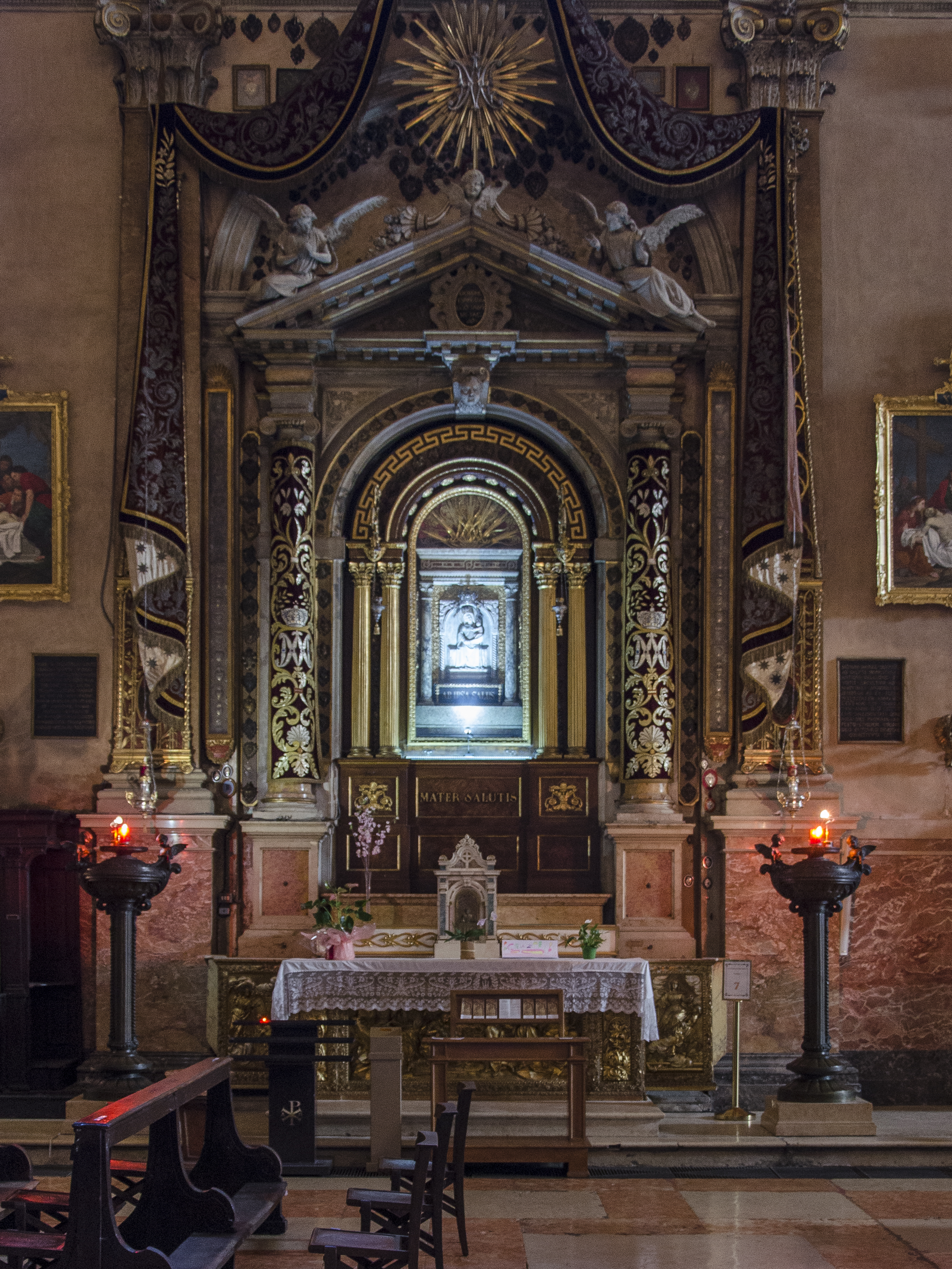
Sixth altar

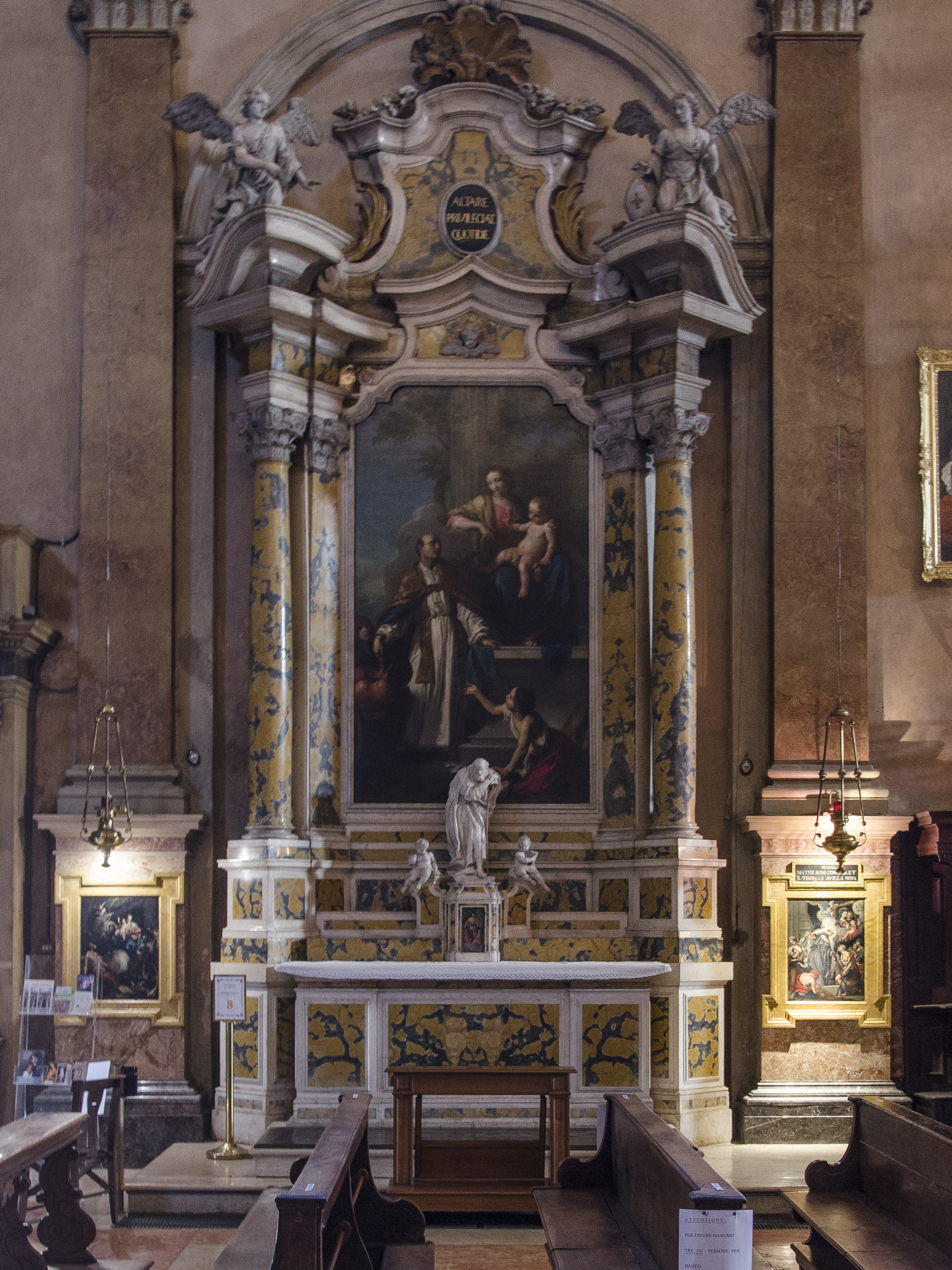
Last altar

==== Left side of the nave ====
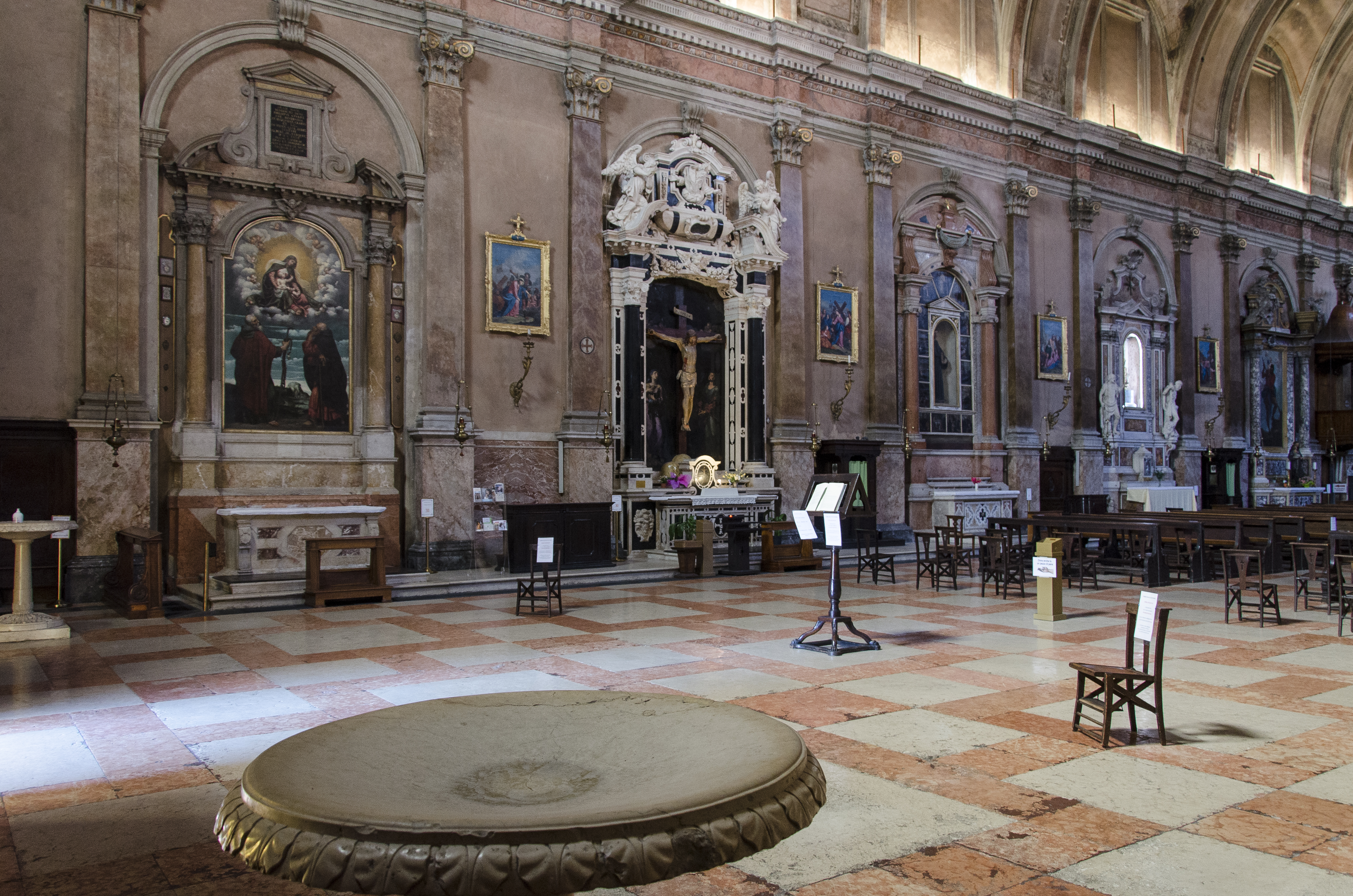
Left side

Having passed through the main doorway, heading toward the left side of the hall, one encounters hanging on the wall a canvas attributed to Felice Brusasorzi depicting the Crucifix with the Madonna, St. Mary Magdalene and St. John, present in St. Euphemia since at least 1854, the date of its first mention. Immediately afterwards there is the first side altar on the left, made in 1740 on commission by Alessandro da Sacco, tampering with an earlier one made in 1632 by Filippo Torriani. The altarpiece placed here in the mid-19th century is the work of Alessandro Bonvicino, known as “il Moretto,” who painted around 1540 a Madonna in Glory and Saints Onofrio and Antonio Abate.

The second altar was built by Gian Giacomo Lonardi between 1695 and 1696, also replacing an earlier one that was deemed too modest for the church. The patron's family is remembered through two noble coats of arms placed at the foot of the columns of the altar itself. It features alternating black and white marble; on the finial is a sculpture, Eternal between two angels, carved by Francesco Filippini. In the center of the altar is a wooden crucifix emerging from a dark background on which the painter Sante Prunati painted the figures of Mary and St. John absorbed in grief over Jesus' death.

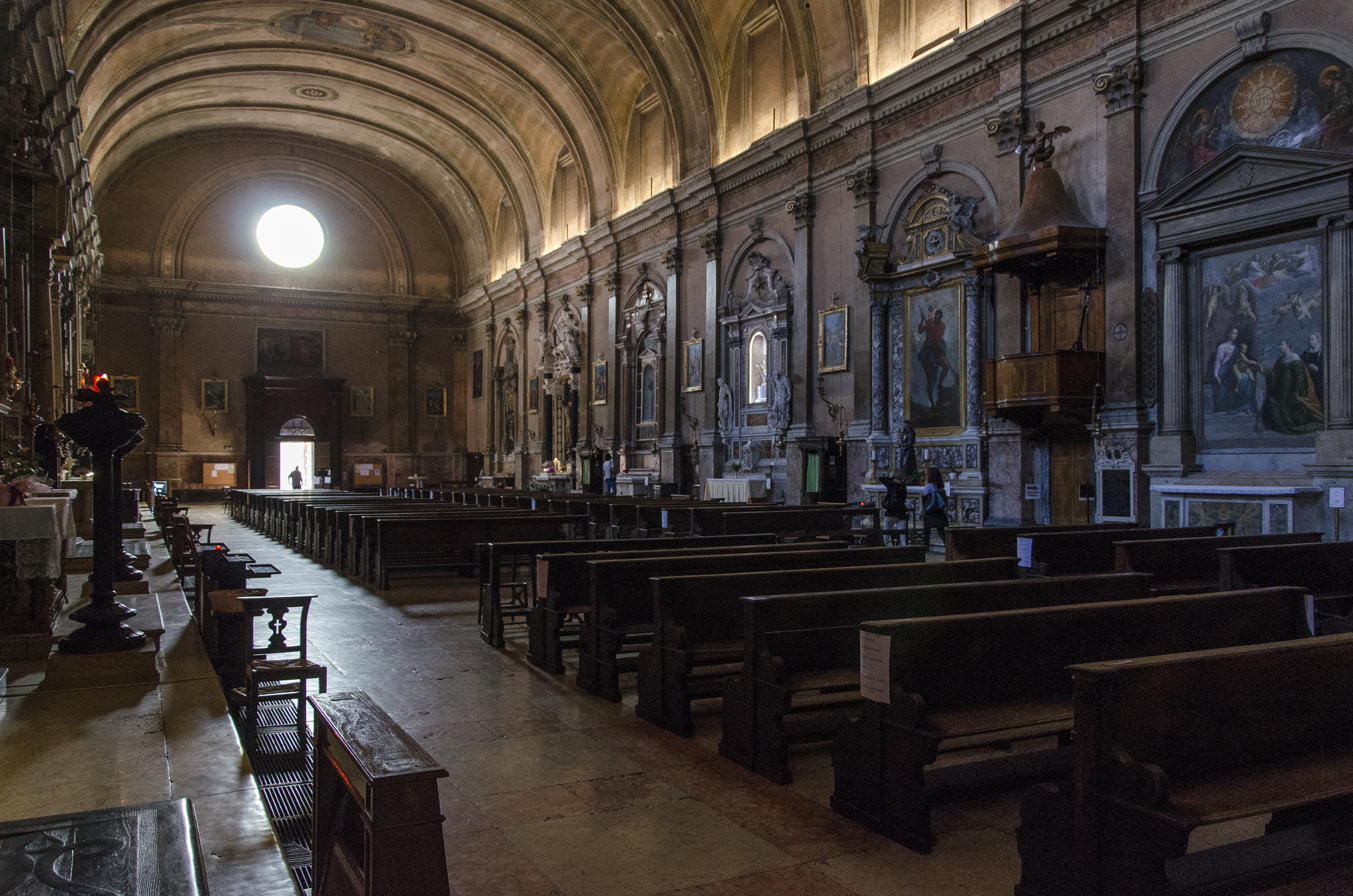
Left side

In the center of the third altar is a statue of Nicholas of Tolentino, an Augustinian saint venerated in St. Euphemia since the second half of the 14th century. It is placed in a niche surrounded by 15 small canvases painted by Domenico Zanconti between the 18th and 19th centuries with scenes from the life of the titular saint. Commissioners of the altar were members of the Lanfranchini family as evidenced by an inscription engraved at the foot of the right column and the presence of their coat of arms on the keystone.

The next altar, the fourth, belonged to the Campagna family as recalled by their coats of arms engraved next to the mensa; it was made in the 18th century. Diomiro Cignaroli is the author of the two statues representing St. John the Baptist and St. Jerome, while in the center in a niche is placed the sculptural group of the Pietà of St. Euphemia attributable to the second half of the 14th century, the oldest work preserved in the church and the oldest depiction of pietà in the entire Veneto region; some critics have noted the similarity with the famous Roettgen Pietà preserved in the Rheinisches Landesmuseum Bonn.

The fifth altar was made in 1744 through the commission made in the previous year by the Arte degli Osti to the sculptor Gaudenzio Bellini. It is presented as a work characterized by the great wealth of marble employed in its creation. A canvas representing St. Christopher, a 1690 work by Ludovico Dorigny, is enclosed in a frame of yellow marble from Torri del Benaco.

Continuing toward the chancel is the sixth altar. It was made in 1573 on the commission of the nobleman Gasparo Verità. With classical forms reminiscent of the work of the famous Veronese Renaissance architect Michele Sanmicheli, it houses an altarpiece, made by Bernardino India late in his life, depicting the Wedding of St. Catherine.

The seventh and last altar is dedicated to St. Charles Borromeo. It was commissioned in 1618 by Antonio Visconi as recalled by the family coats of arms engraved on the bases of the two columns. The canvas, Madonna and St. Charles Borromeo placed between St. Paul and St. Anthony Abbot, is the work of Claudio Ridolfi from 1618, recalling the style of Federico Barocci.

Finally, on the left side, before reaching the arch that divides the nave from the presbytery, there is a door leading to the sacristy, above which hangs a 1573 canvas by Paolo Farinati, who signed it “PAOLUS FARINA / TUS P. MDLXX/III,” depicting the Archangel St. Michael.

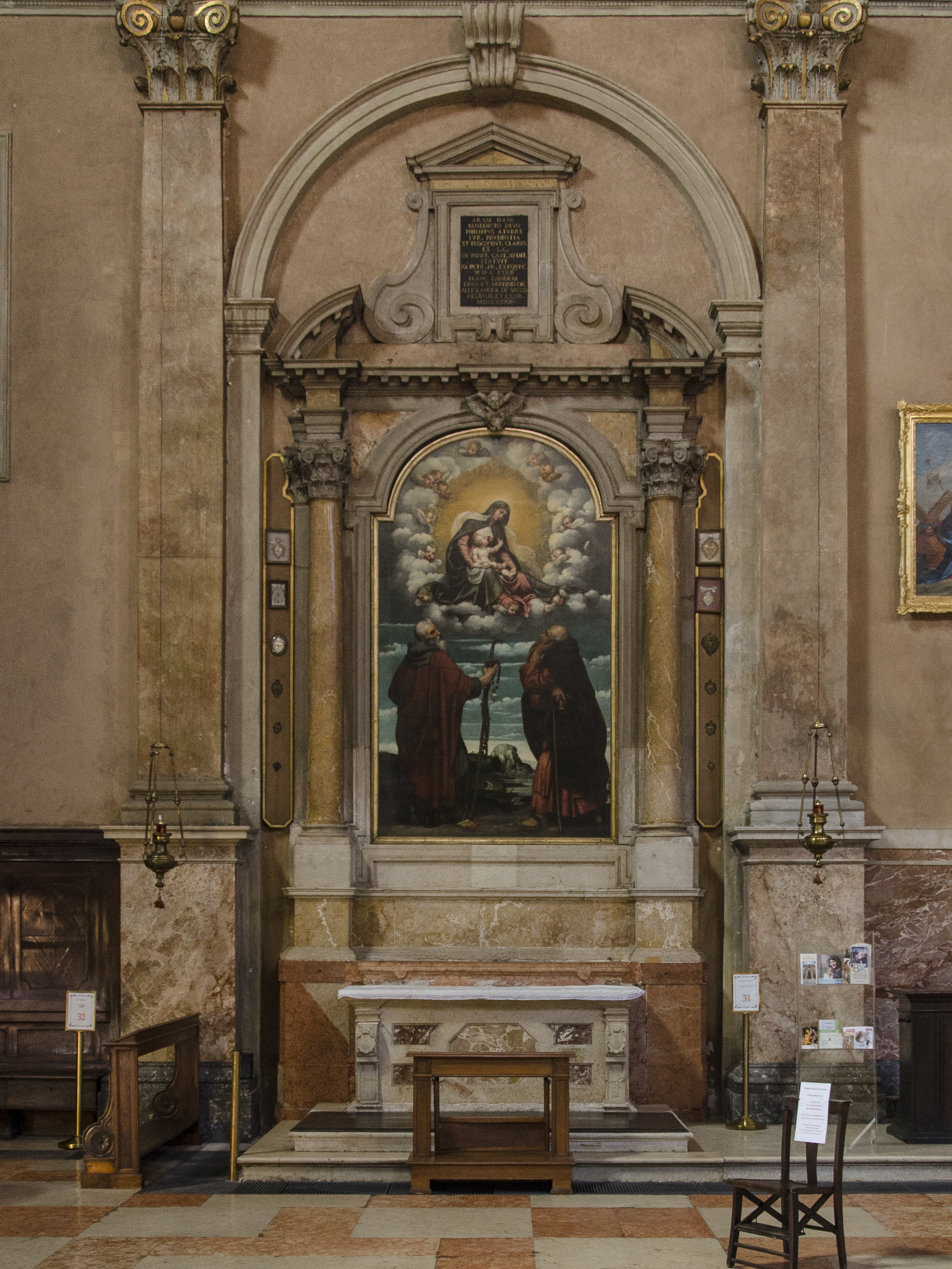
First altar on the left, starting from the entrance

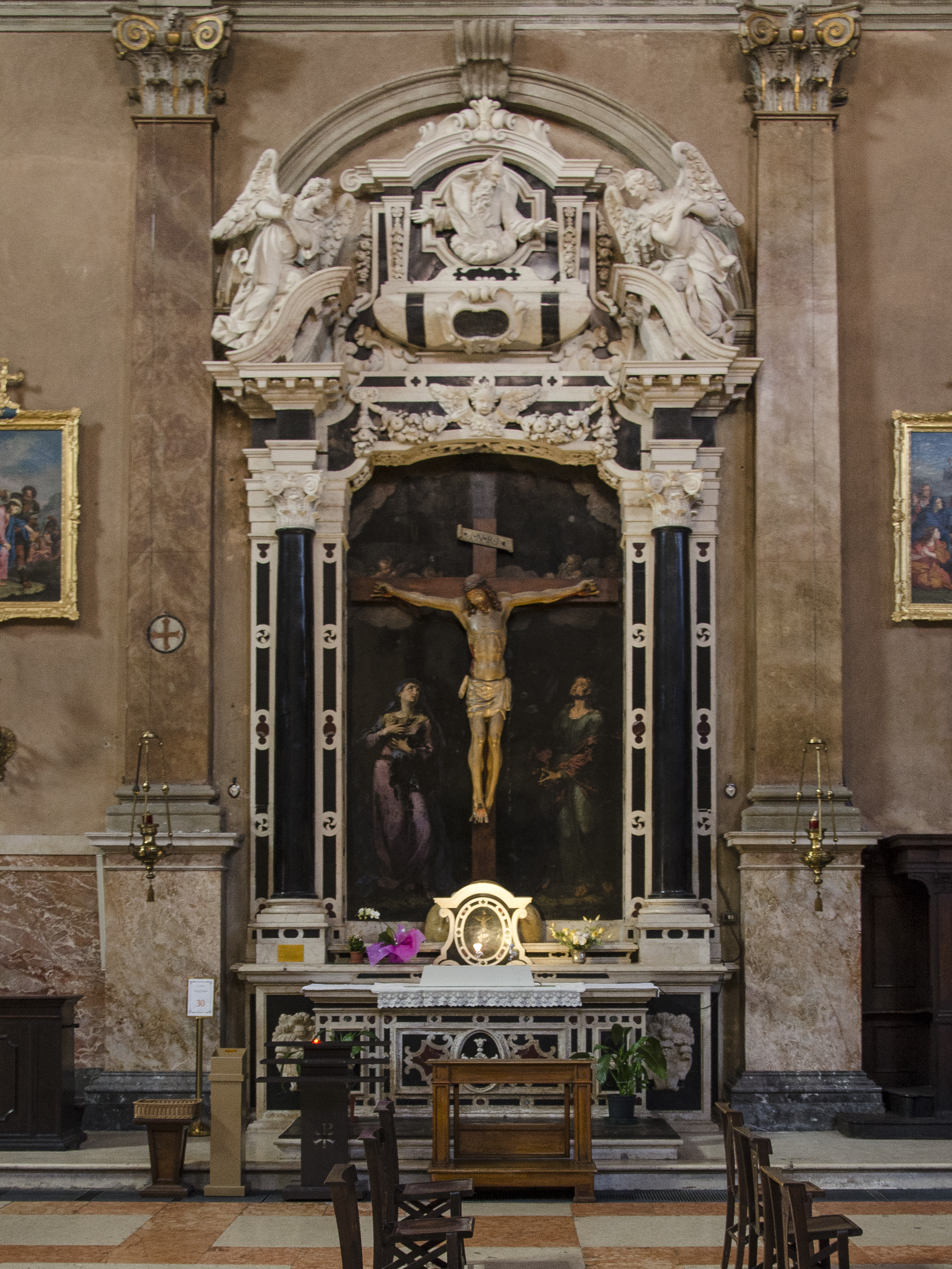
Second altar

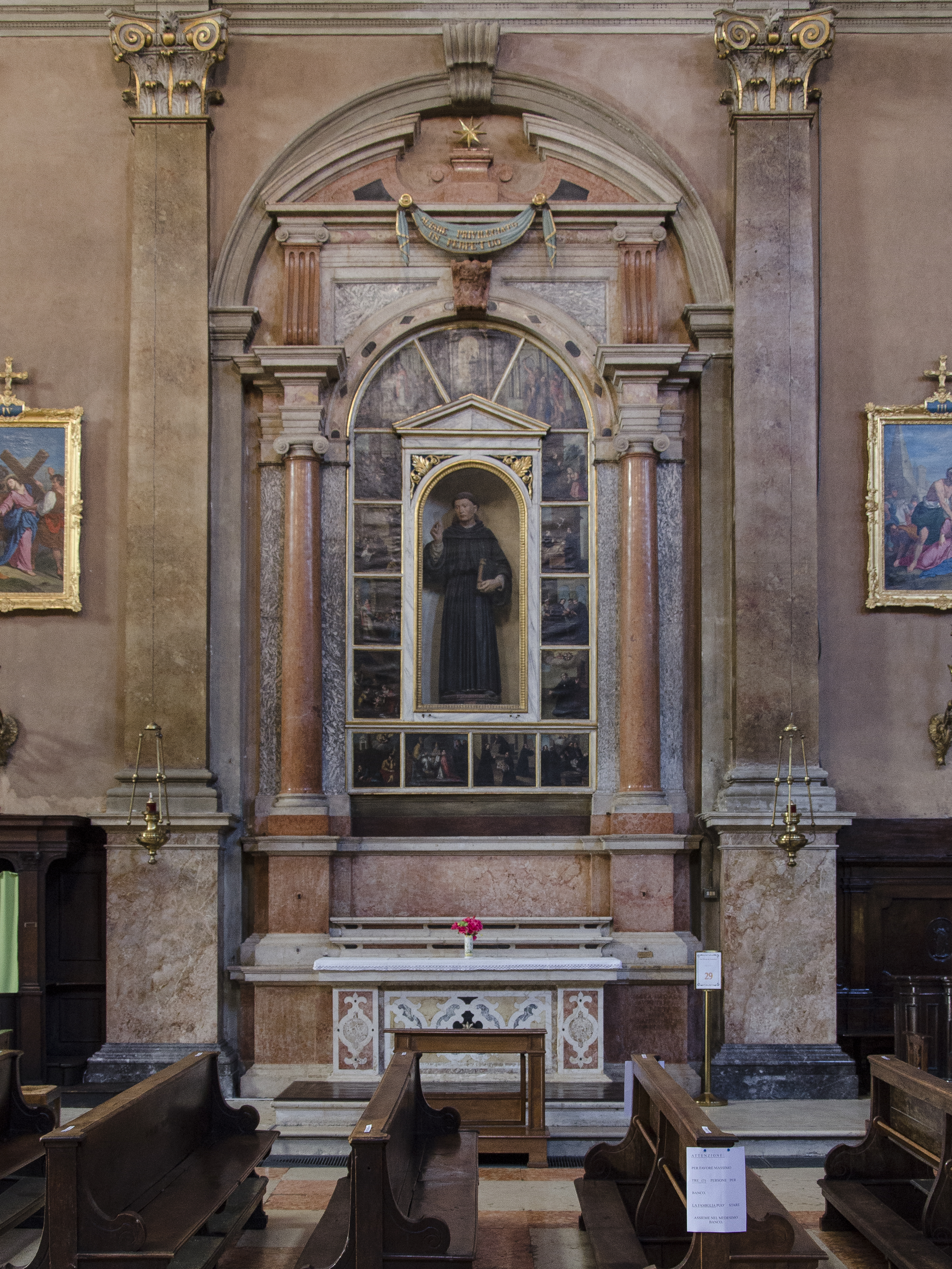
Third altar

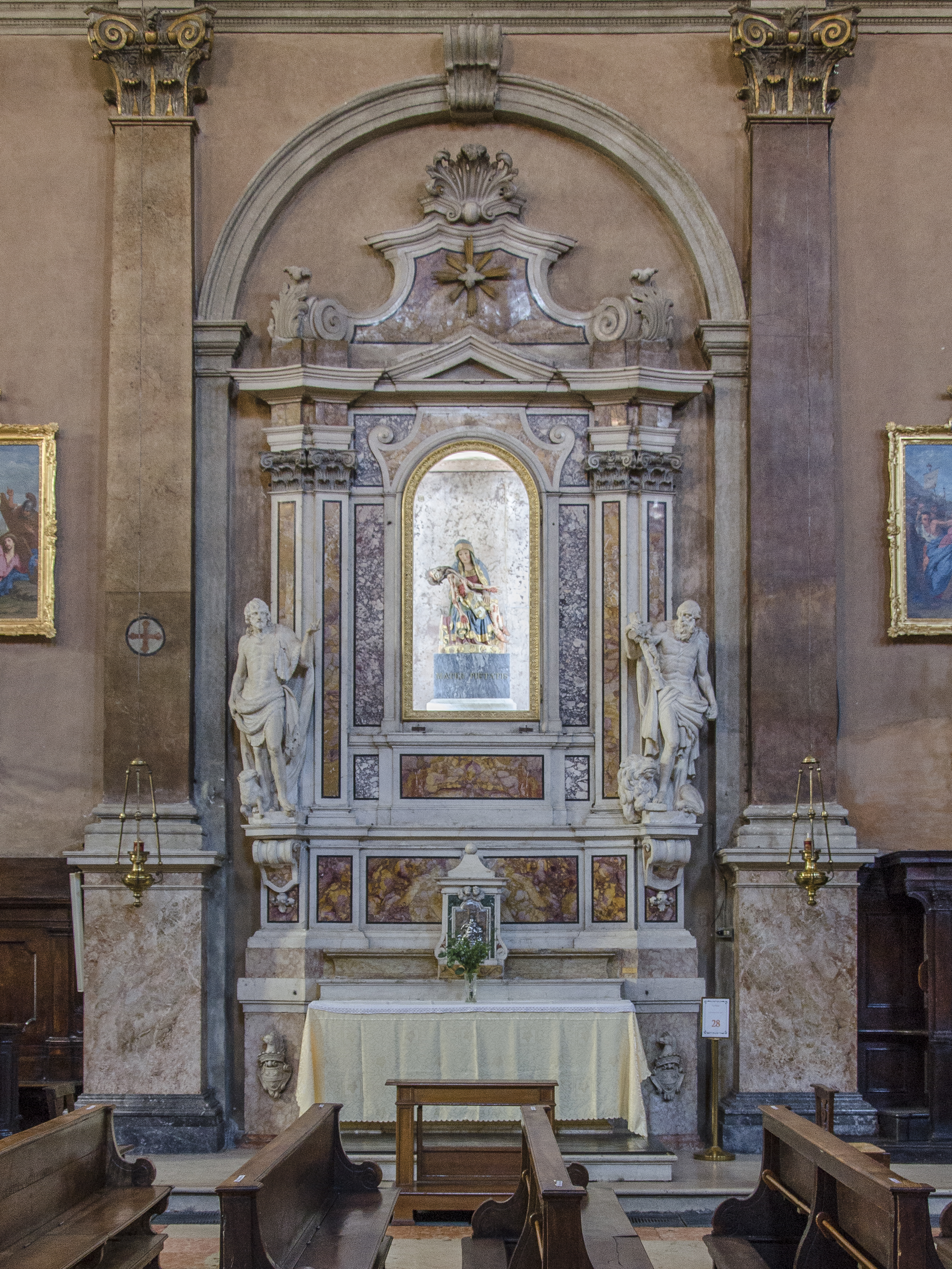
Fourth altar

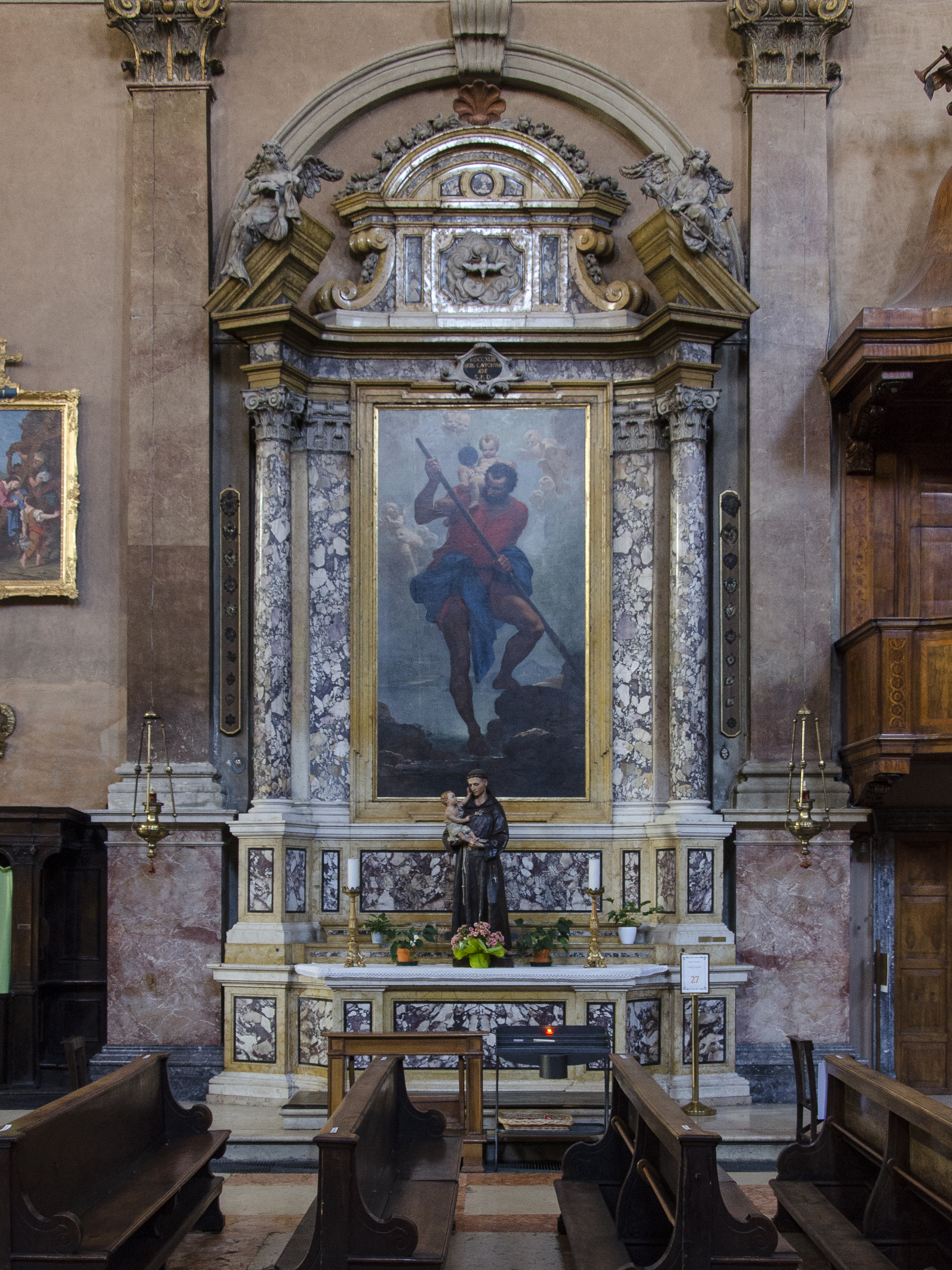
Fifth altar

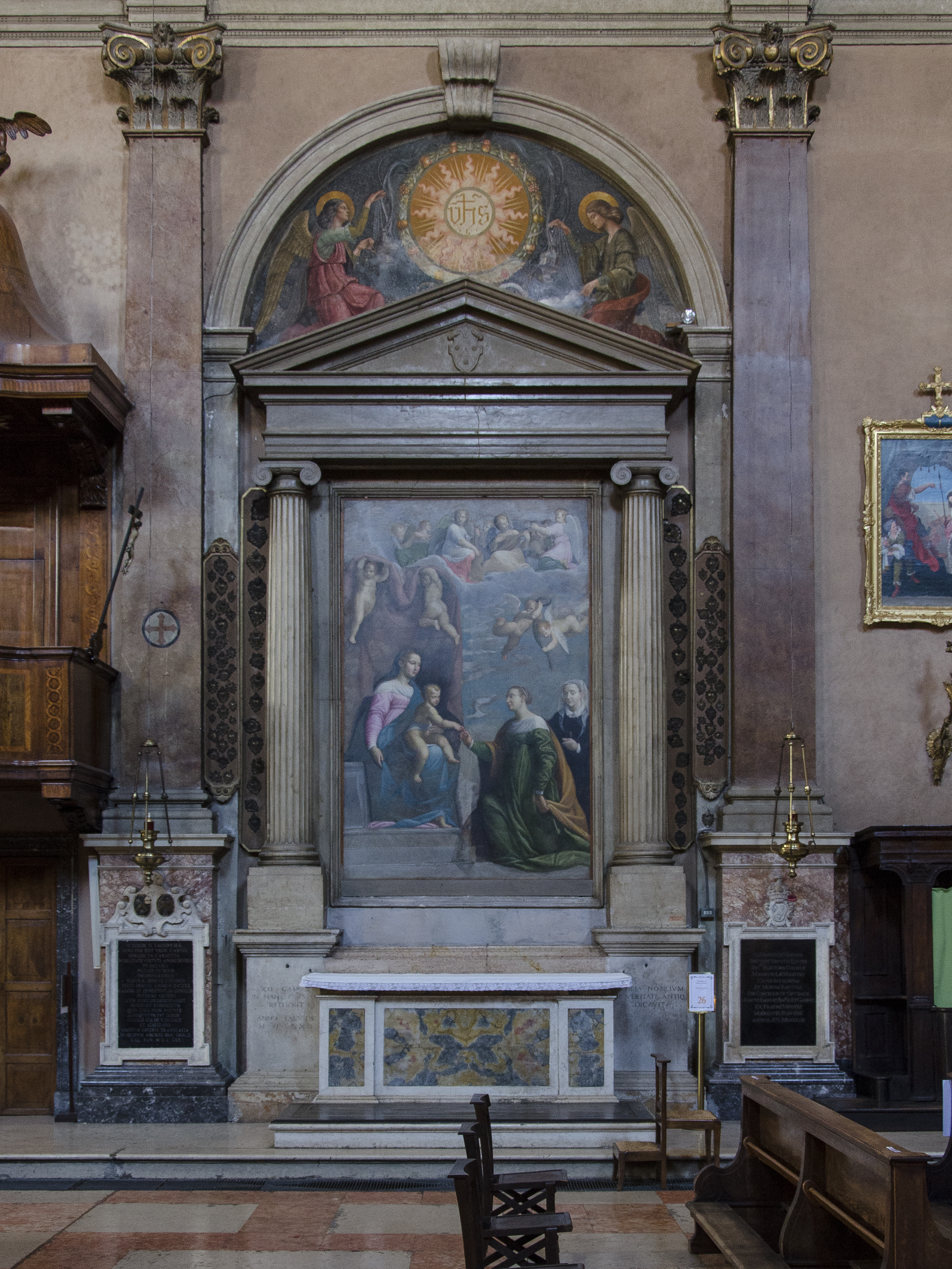
Sixth altar

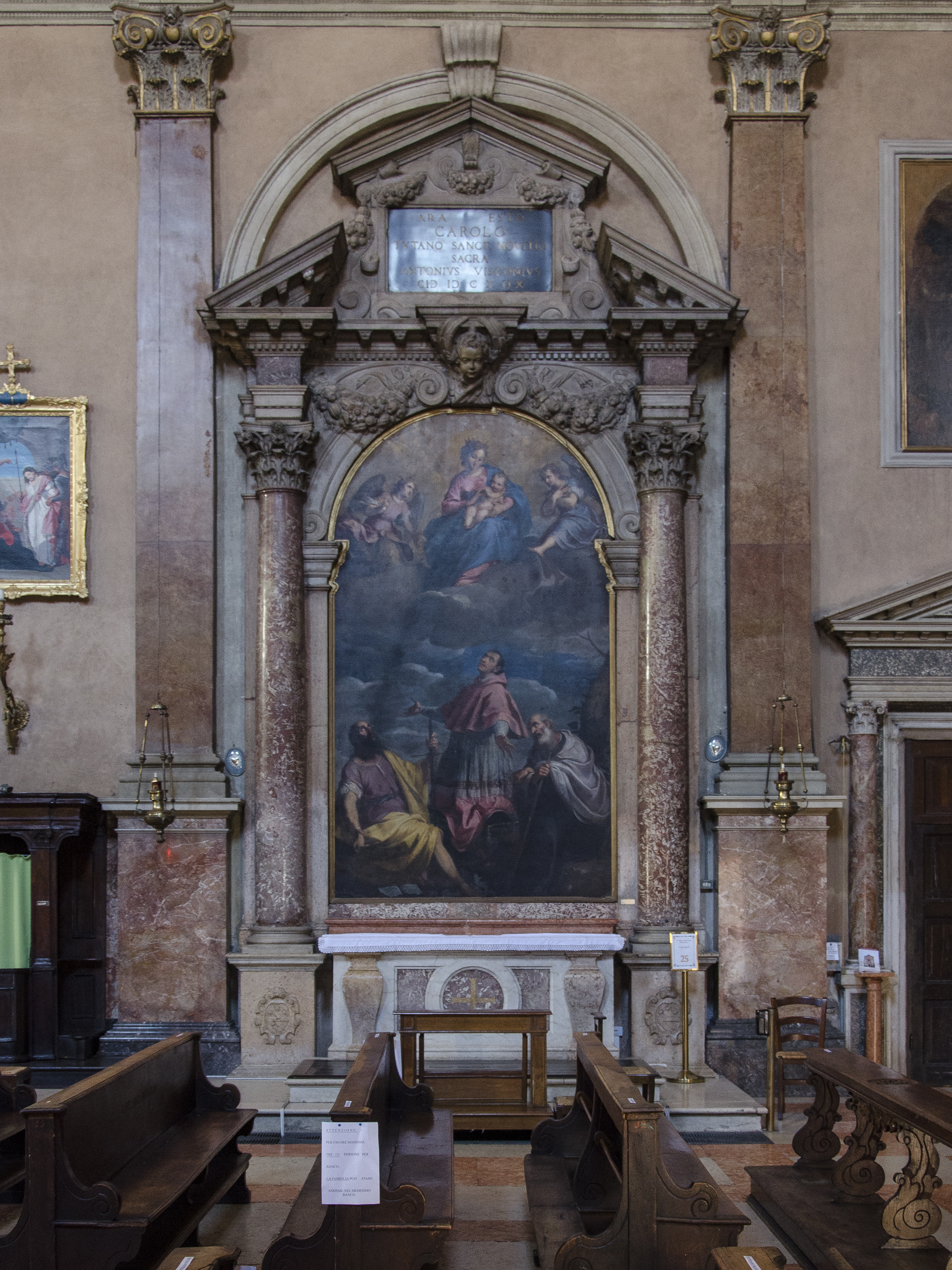
Last altar

==== Crossing ====
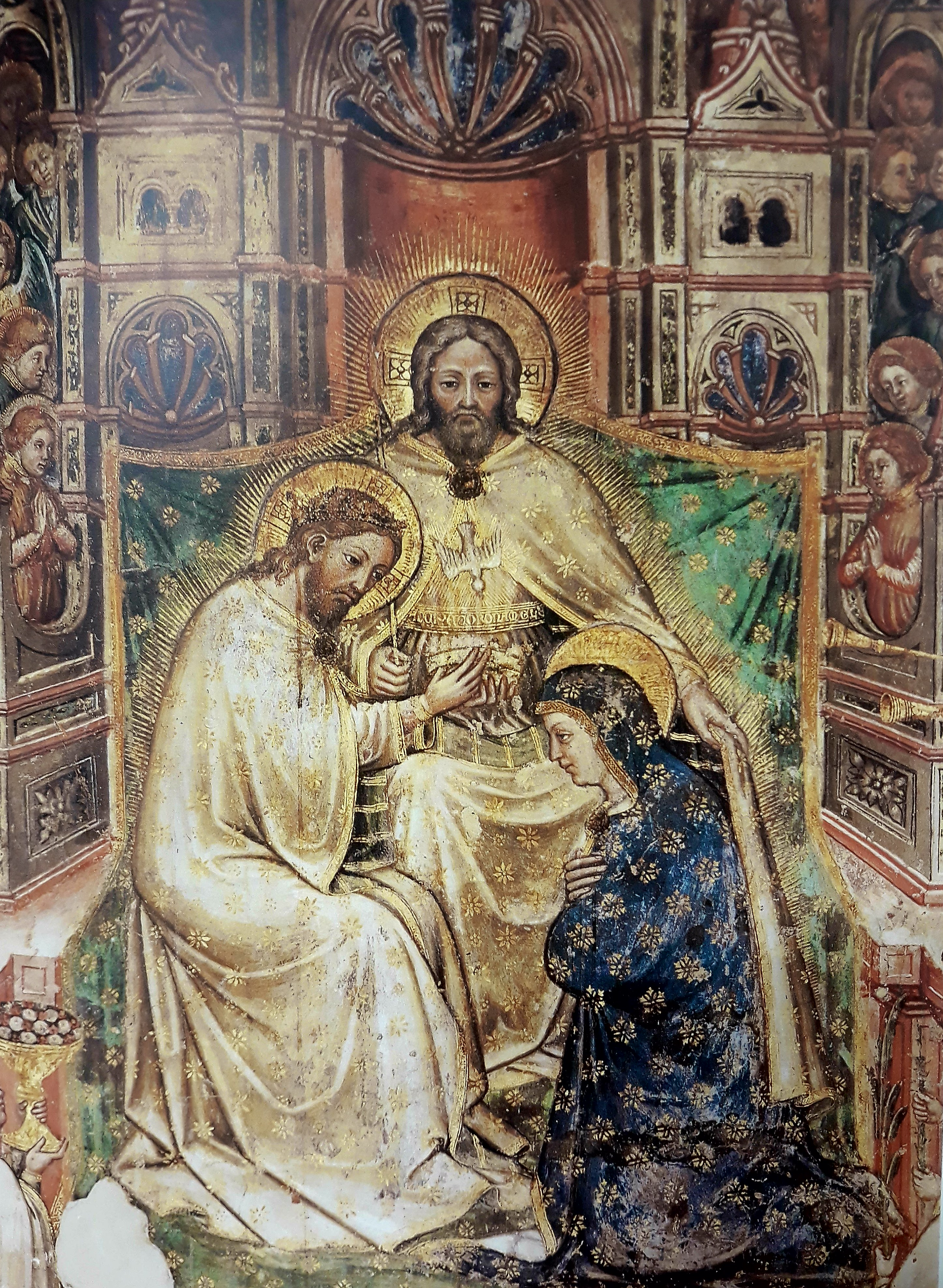
Martino da Verona, Coronation of the Virgin

In the left arm of the crossing is the baptismal font dating from 1601; placed here since 1968, when it was moved from its original location to the right of the main portal, it is made of red Verona marble on which simple moldings are carved. In the center is the Banda coat of arms and the inscription “GALEATIUS DE/ BANDIS COMES / 16/01.” In 1953 it was fitted with a bronze lid that covers the bowl. Above it is the pipe organ.

A door with a tympanum opens on the outer wall, allowing access to a short corridor leading to the sacristy. Embedded on the walls of the corridor are fragments of sepulchral seals and a marble plaque attesting to the bequest in favor of girls for marriage offered by parish priest Massimiliano Lanceni in 1782. Above the door hangs a canvas depicting a St. Michael the Archangel, the work of Paolo Farinati, as attested by the signature “Paulus Farina / tus P. MDLXXIII” discovered in 1950, which refutes the earlier erroneous attribution that indicated Pasquale Ottino as the author.

In the right arm of the crossing is an interesting detached fresco, most likely by Martino da Verona, the Coronation of the Virgin, discovered on March 22, 1966 after the removal of the elevation of a piece of furniture and restored three years later; its sinopia is in the Spolverini Dal Verme chapel. Although critics do not agree precisely on its dating, most date it to the first half of the 15th century, recognizing in it an important example of late Gothic. The painting has been described as clear evidence of the arrival in Verona of a “new current, with very Gothic influences, fuzzy and diminutive signatures, small figures, approaching without further spatial sensitivity,” which would greatly influence local painters.

==== Presbytery and choir ====
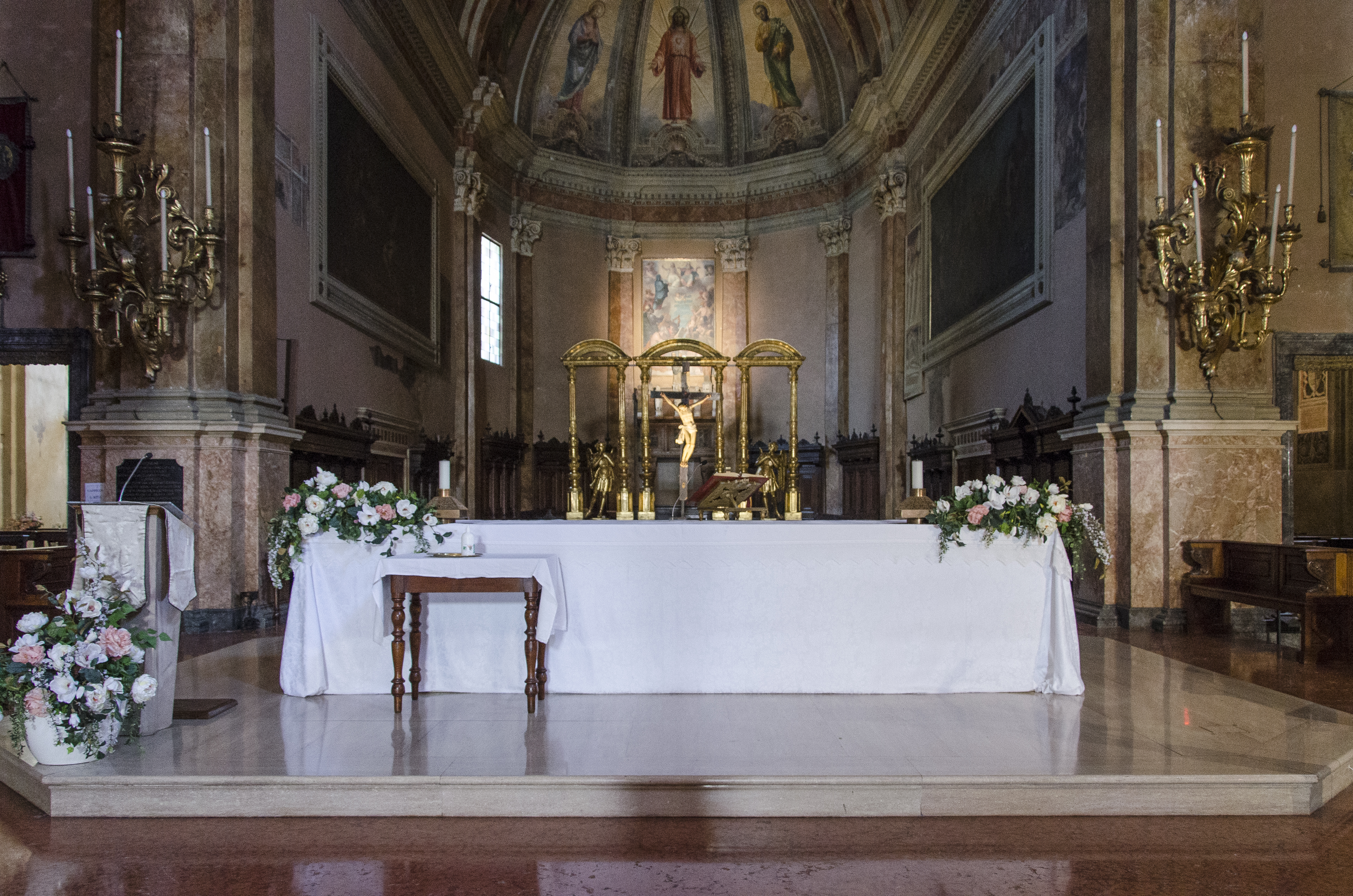
Presbytery area, on the right and left walls the two large canvases covering the ancient frescoes, at the back Brusasorzi's canvas over the Dal Verme funeral monument

Originally, the walls of the church's vast chancel must have been almost entirely covered with frescoes from the late 14th and early 15th centuries; only fragments of these paintings survive today, rediscovered since the second half of the 19th century. For example, on the right wall can be seen some remnants, largely hidden by a large 18th-century canvas, of a large fresco depicting a Last Judgment by Martino da Verona. Of this painting, the best-preserved part, thanks in part to a restoration carried out in 1958, is a left vertical band in which angels, blessed and resurrected are depicted. The 18th-century canvas, on the other hand, is by Paolo Pannelli in which he intended to depict the Martyrdom of seven Augustinian saints.

At the bottom of the apse, however, is a canvas, restored in 1988, by Veronese painter Felice Brusasorzi, who had made it around 1573 on commission from the Verità family, who intended to use it for their altar. The subject chosen by Brusasorzi is a Trinity with the interceding Virgin, saints and patriarchs, and for it he was certainly inspired by Titian's La Gloria. Below it is the funeral monument of the Dal Verme family built by Jacopo Dal Verme in the late 14th century.

On the left wall hangs, from the early decades of the nineteenth century, a large canvas depicting an Annunciation by the painter Claudio Ridolfi that almost completely covers the remains of what must have been a vast fresco, either coeval with the construction of the church or slightly later, in which was depicted a Madonna Enthroned among Saints and of which only parts of Augustinian saints remain.

==== Right apse (or Spolverini-Dal Verme chapel) ====
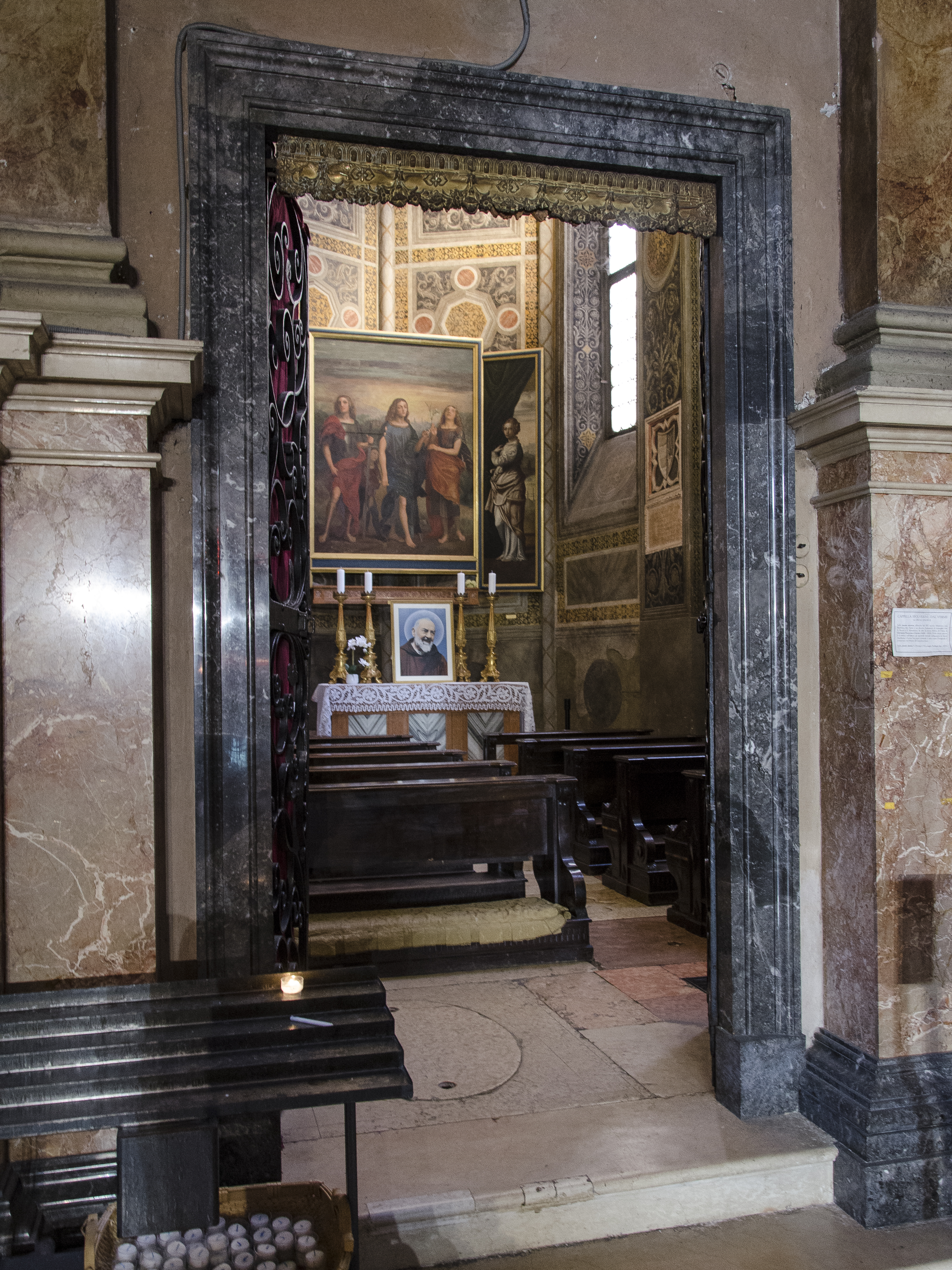
The entrance to the chapel

At the end of the right aisle is a door through which one enters the Spolverini-Dal Verme chapel, which occupies the space of the right apse. Now dedicated to the angels, originally consecrated to Archangel Raphael at St. Homobonus, the chapel features interesting pictorial and architectural elements. Its design is due to the architect Giovanni da Ferrara, who began it around the end of 1390 and who designed a decidedly slender ogival vault for it through the use of thin ribs.

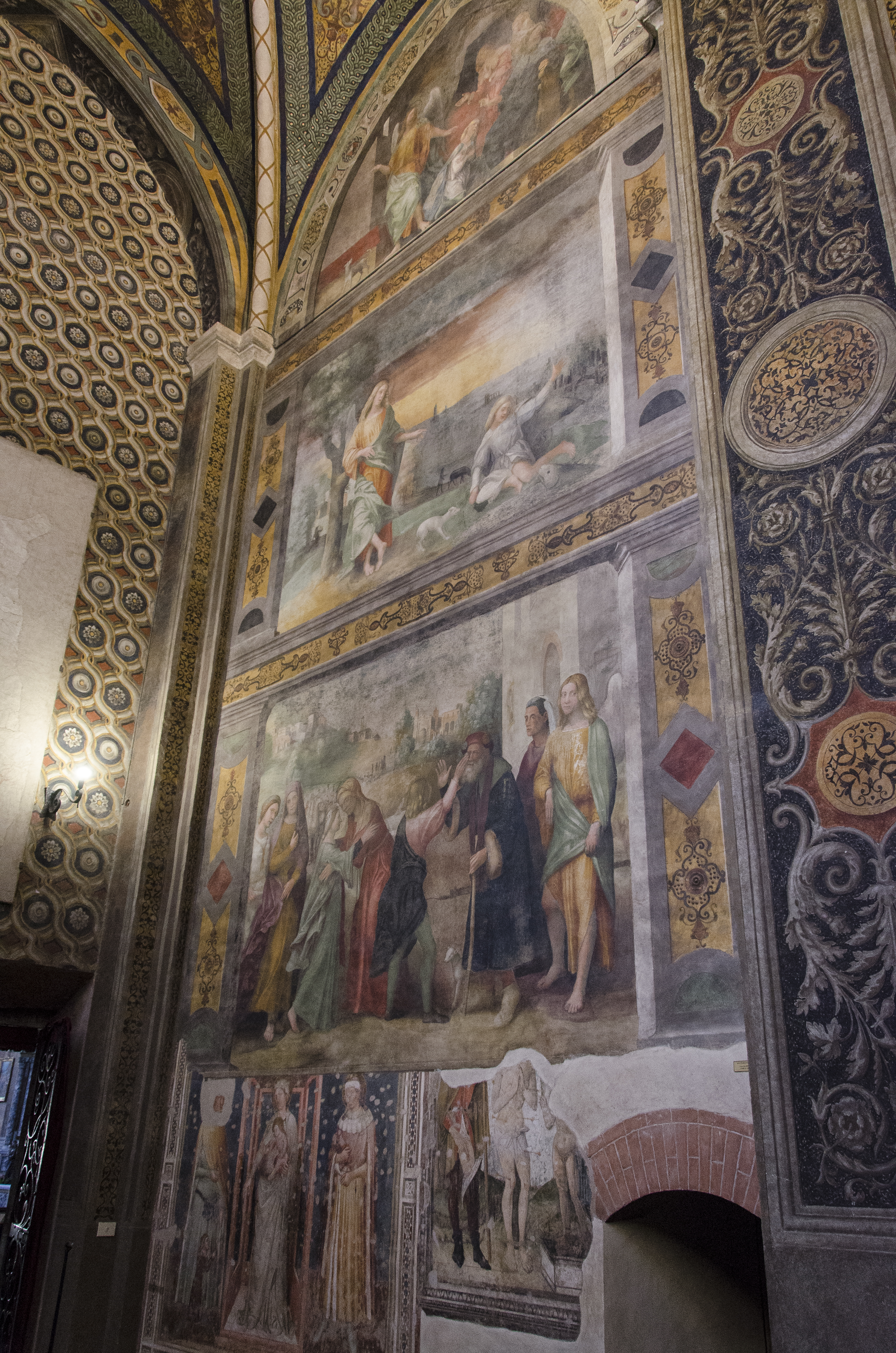
Left wall: on the lower section frescoes from the end of the 14th century (Madonna and Child between two Saints and a devotee and fragments of Saints), on the upper section works by Giovan Francesco Caroto (1508)

The chapel contains pictorial works dating from two distinct periods, 14th and 16th centuries. They are divided into several levels: in the first at the bottom one can recognize the phases of the late 14th-century period, by unknown authors who worked at the same time as the construction of the chapel, while in the later ones one can identify interventions that can be traced back to 1508 by Giovan Francesco Caroto, who went on to cover the previous frescoes. Of the early series of frescoes, now partially damaged by time, a few can be seen on the lower right wall; among them a St. Dionysius, interpreted in his traditional iconography while supporting his own head with his hand, and an Archangel Raphael are recognizable. Until about the middle of the 20th century, a depiction of Tobias next to the Archangel was also still visible. Still of the oldest frescoes, on the left wall, a valuable Madonna and Child between two Saints and a devotee can be seen (she is in an unusual position for Veronese culture, that is, standing and surrounded by two saints or knights, perhaps Pietro and Lucchino Dal Verme) placed next to the entrance of the chapel, which is followed by some commemorative fragments of three saints: a St. Roch, a St. Sebastian, and probably a St. Lawrence, of a much lower quality than the Madonna.

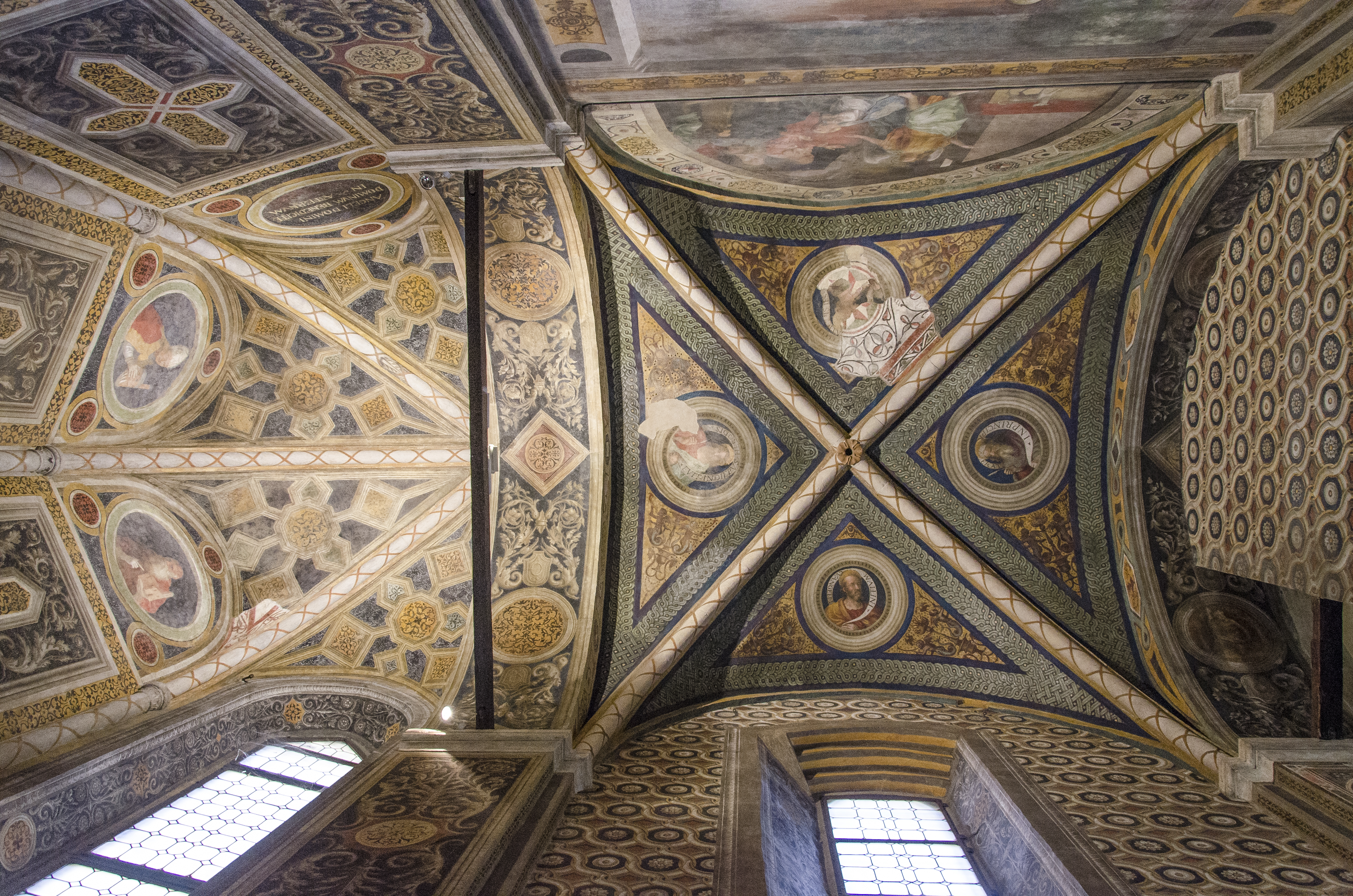
The vaulted ceiling of the chapel

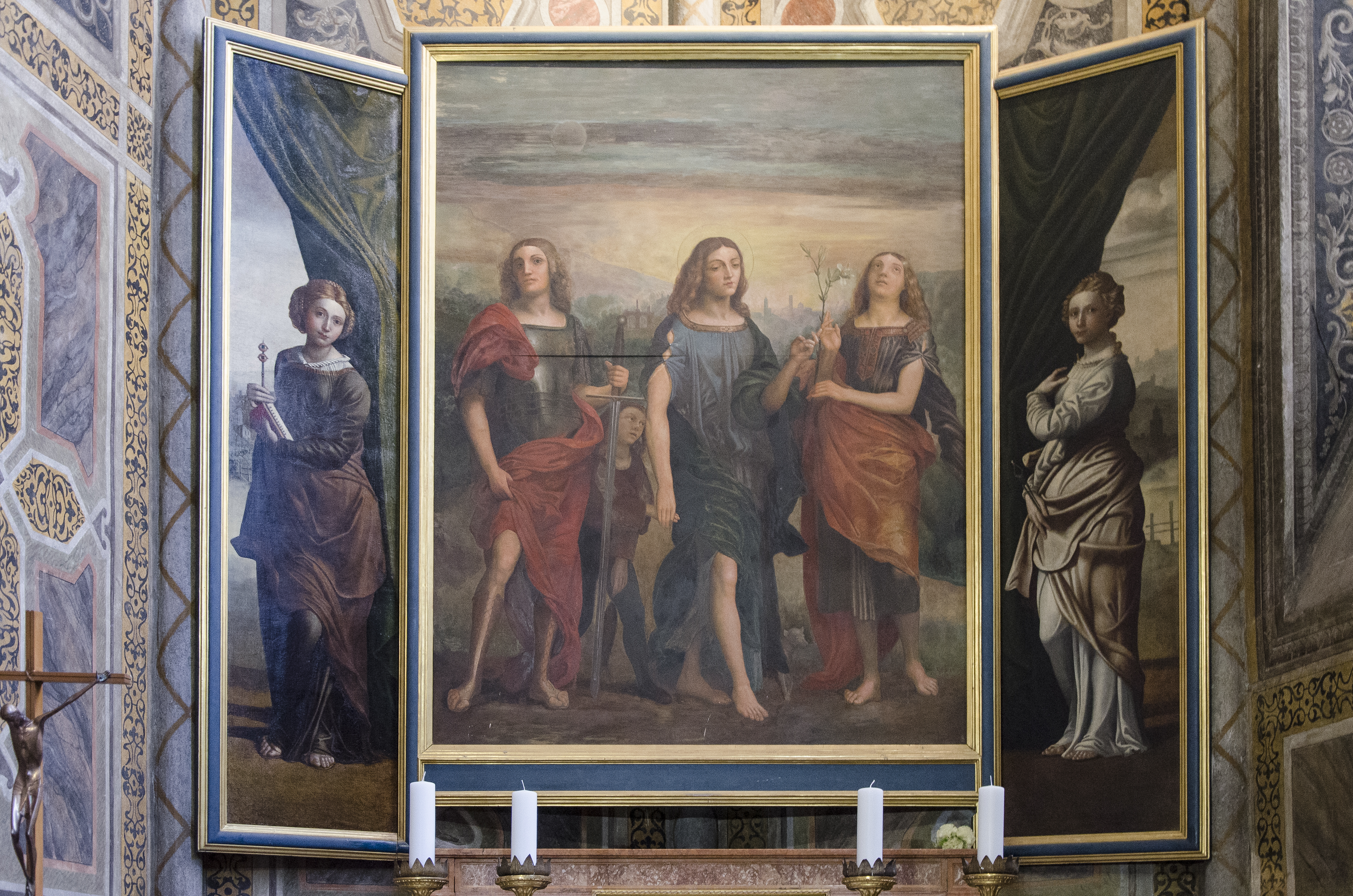
The altarpiece

Most of the left wall of the chapel is, however, decorated by the later fresco cycles painted by Giovan Francesco Caroto around 1508 in which he depicted on two overlapping sections Stories of Tobias and Stories of the Archangel Raphael. In the top register, Tobias bids farewell to his father; in the next, he eviscerates a fish (heart, brain and gall) at the Archangel's suggestion with the purpose of obtaining medicines from it; in the last, he returns to his father with his young wife and cures his adored parent from blindness with medicines obtained from the fish. Caroto's intervention extends into the vault of the chapel where sumptuous ornamentation remains, and in the center of the four segments are placed four roundels with busts of the evangelists. Giovan Francesco was also the author of the chapel's altarpiece, now preserved at the Castelvecchio Civic Museum and replaced on site by a 1934 copy by Gaetano Miolato, in which in the central triptych the painter intended to depict the Three Archangels (Michael, Raphael, Gabriel). The attribution of this work is certain and the author signed it with “F. CAROTUS P.,” whereas the attribution of two doors of the triptych, still preserved in the chapel, is more uncertain, which some critics instead would assign to his brother Giovanni Caroto. On them are depicted Saint Apollonia and Saint Lucia.

On the pilaster that separates the apse from the span of the chapel, the bas-relief with the coat of arms commemorating the marriage between Jacopo Dal Verme and Cia degli Ubaldini are from the early 15th century. The flooring of the chapel is composed of tombstones of local noble families, placed in this historic corner following a modernization in the 20th century of the church.

==== Left apse (or chapel of Saint Rita) ====
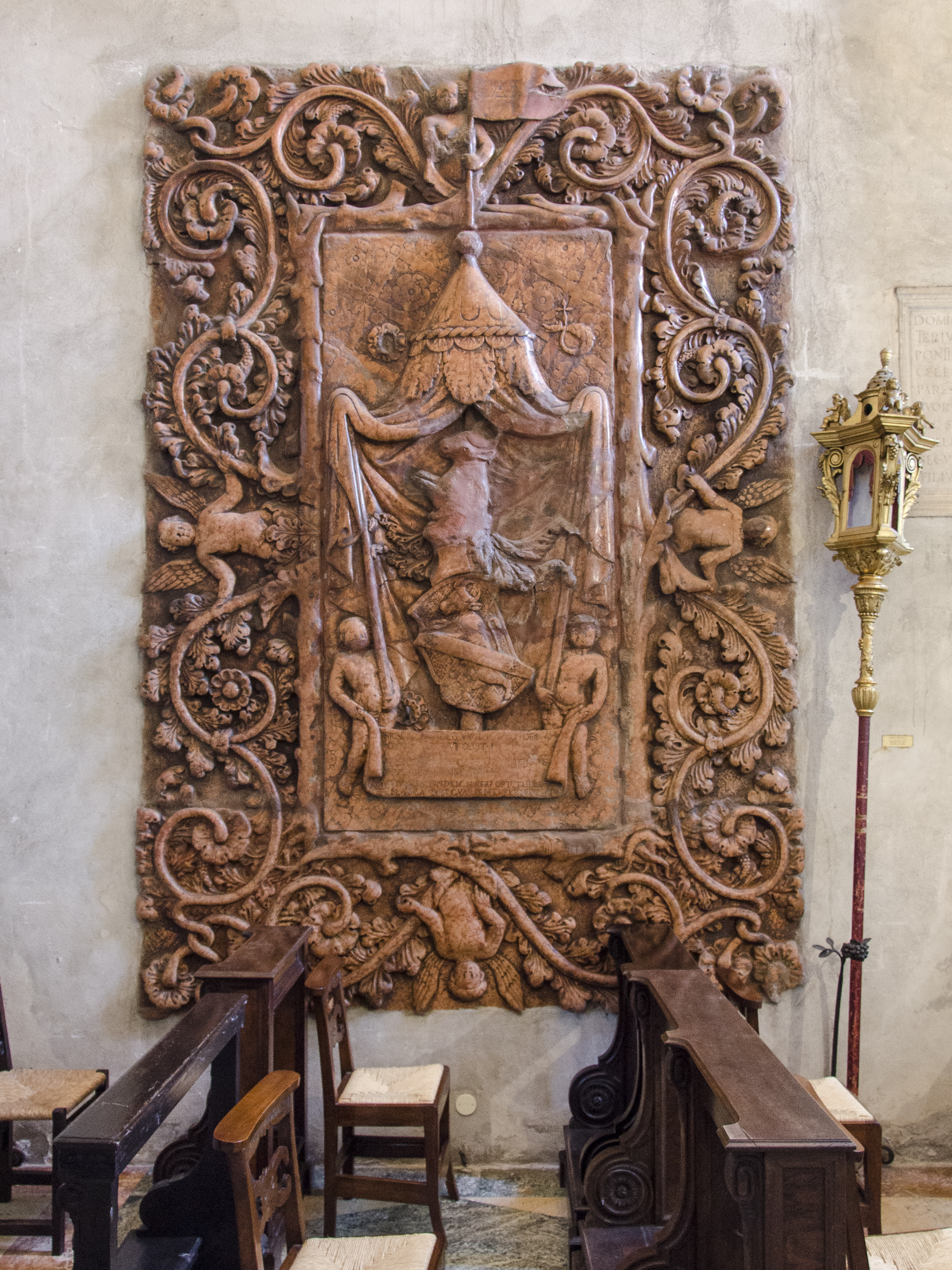
Funeral monument of the Guarienti family.

The chapel of St. Rita, whose construction began in 1379, is located at the end of the left aisle and next to the presbytery occupying the minor west apse of the church. It is also known as the Chapel of St. Augustine because its interior contains the famous fresco Glory of St. Augustine by Stefano da Verona, which was detached in 1958 from its previous location outside the church, above the portal on the eastern side. Mentioned with admiration by Giorgio Vasari, the fresco, which bears the author's signature “STEFANUS / PINXIT,” is now in a poor condition that only hints at the chromatic richness it could have boasted.

On the right wall is an additional fresco, also detached, depicting the archangel St. Michael chronologically datable between the end of the 14th century and the beginning of the following century. Discovered in 1958, it, too, is in a precarious state of preservation but still reveals the “vividness and freshness of the colors” with which it was painted. Below it are two polychrome relief coats of arms belonging to the noble Veronese Dal Verme family dating back to the 14th century. On the opposite wall, the left, are two tomb monuments, of which that of the Guarienti family stands out for its decorative richness. Above them is a canvas by painter Dionisio Battaglia, who signed “DIONISIUS BATTALEA FECIT 1574,” in which he depicted a Madonna and Saints Julian and Juliana.

==== Sacristy ====
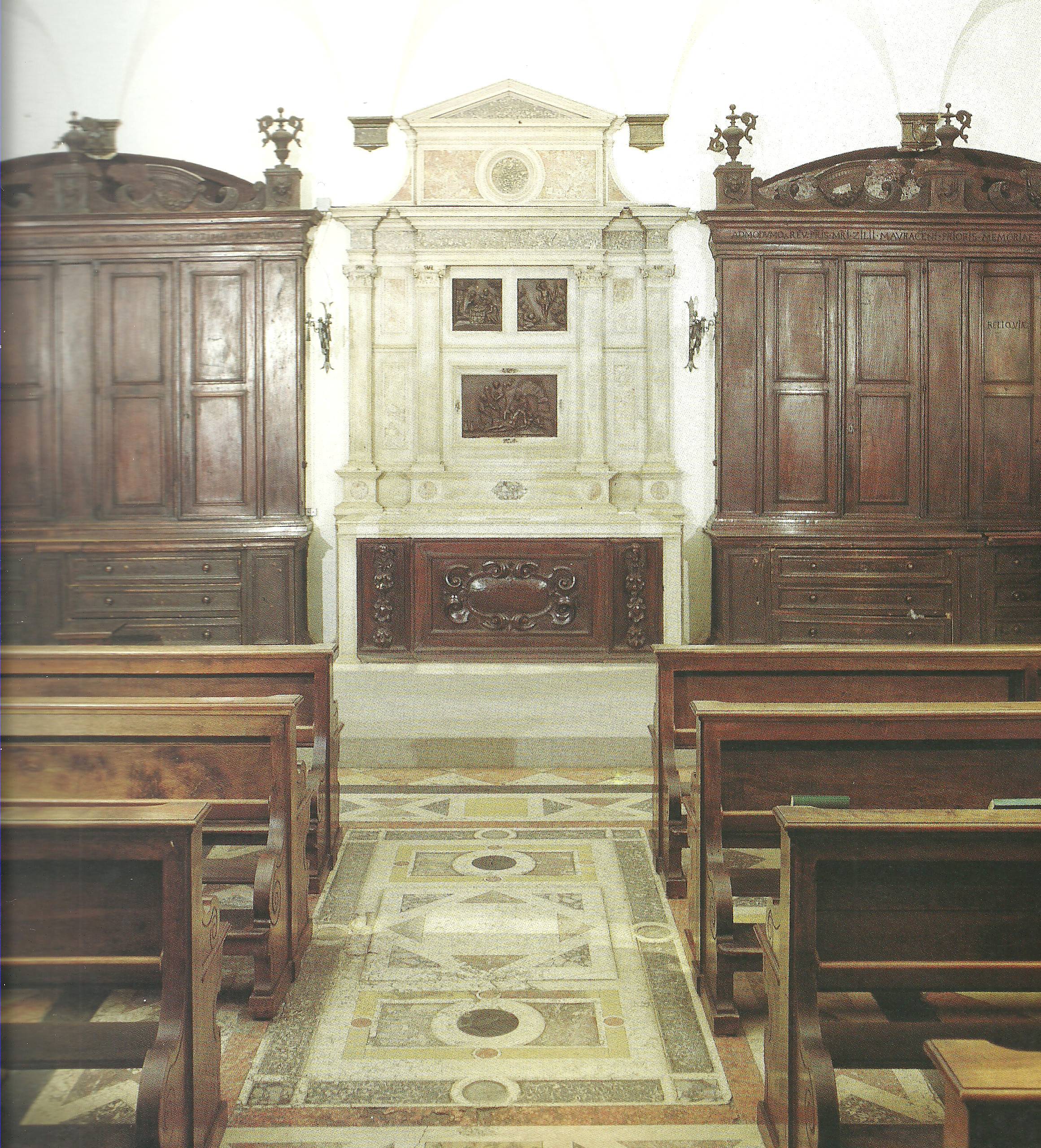
Interior of the sacristy

On the left wall of the cross vault opens a door through which one enters, after walking down a short corridor, the church sacristy. This is housed in a room whose construction dates back to the first decades of the 16th century; part of the flooring, the one in the center of the room, is still the original one as is the altar. The latter consists of a complex of marbles of different shades of gray and red alternating with some white ones. Initially it was also decorated with three bronze panels carved by Andrea Riccio in which he had depicted a Nativity, a Deposition and a Resurrection, now replaced by wooden copies since the originals were looted at the end of the 18th century by the French army during the Napoleonic occupation, when the abbey was turned into a military hospital. There is also a wooden antependium on the altar, a 17th-century work, on which figures of cherubs supporting festoons of fruit and leaves are carved, while in the center is a long inscription recalling the work of the priors who were responsible for furnishing the sacristy.

Of particular note is the elegant furniture of the sacristy composed of two cabinets placed on either side of the altar, decorated with a complex finial and made at the behest of prior Egidio Morosini in 1629, shortly before the outbreak of the plague of 1630 that scourged the city of Verona and the monastery. On the left is a small washbasin made of red Verona marble dating from the 15th century, decorated with a beautifully crafted relief. Above the door that connects the sacristy to the church is a plaque on which, inside an oval, the face of the man of letters Luigi Gaiter is depicted.

On the right wall is a canvas, depicting a Saint Nicholas of Tolentino, attributed to Domenico Brusasorzi, which is followed by a Virgin and Child with Saints Catherine and Lucy by an unknown author, who was active between the 16th and 17th centuries. On the left wall is a canvas, also by Domenico Brusasorzi, who painted a St. Augustine and an 18th-century Our Lady of Good Counsel whose author is unknown. Until the end of the 19th century, four canvases by the painter Dionisio Guerri also hung on the walls, whose fate, except for the Baptism of St. Augustine now in the Castelvecchio Museum, is unknown.

== Monastery ==
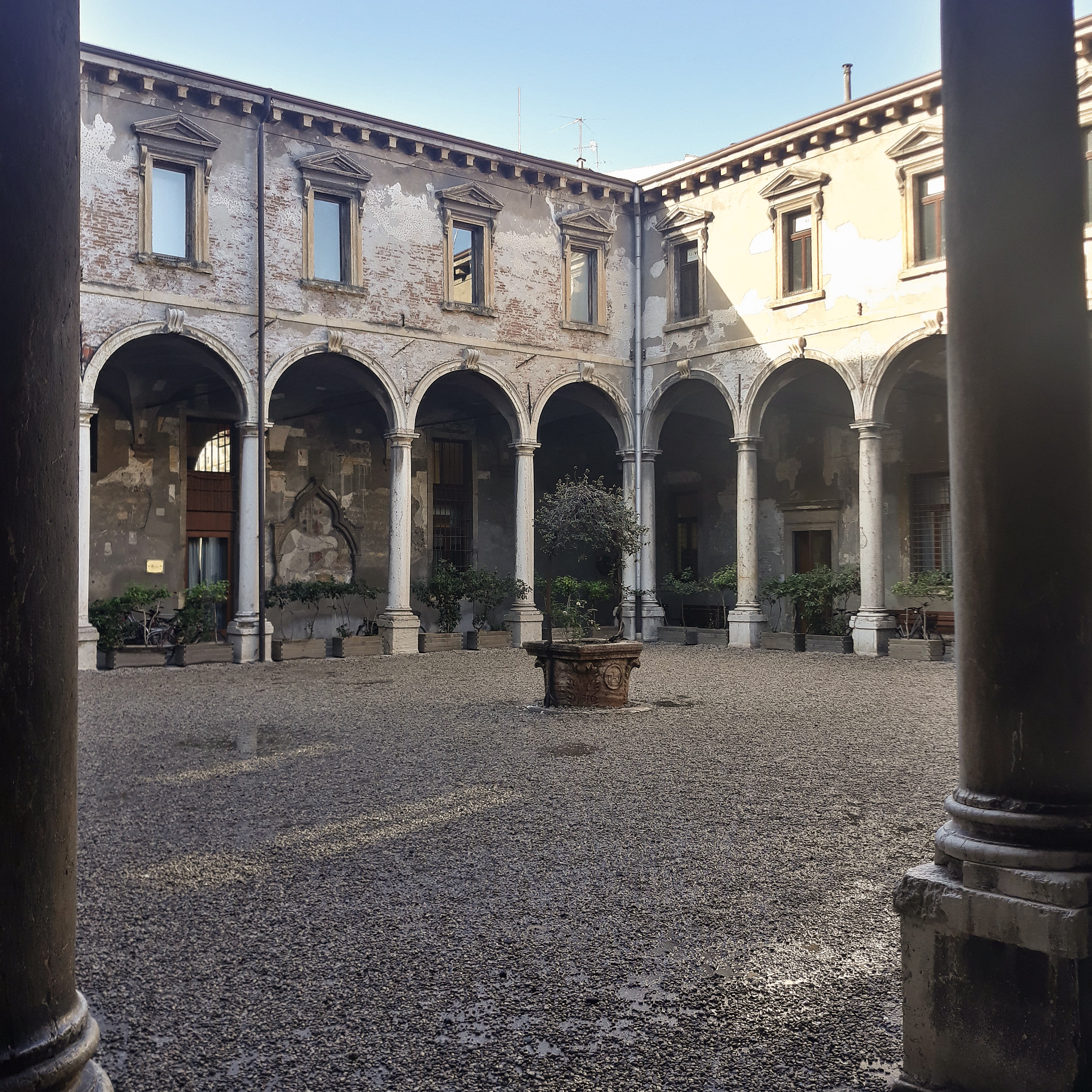
The main cloister, a 17th-century work by Domenico Curtoni.

As mentioned, the church of St. Euphemia was part of a much larger complex that included the monastery of the Augustinians. This consisted of a large building body flanked by two cloisters overlooked by the monks' dwellings. Its construction was begun in 1267: the first, rectangular cloister was completed in 1268, while other work continued until 1289. In the meantime the church was rebuilt: work started in 1275 and continued at least until 1331, when it was consecrated; from 1315 until the middle of the 14th century the church was further enlarged and elevated to make one large hall, and at the same time as this work the first cloister was modified. In 1617, the square major cloister was finally built to a design by Domenico Curtoni, while the minor cloister was renovated in 1636 to a design attributed to Lelio Pellesina.

The monastery enjoyed great fame among the people of Verona, and illustrious figures from both the religious and scientific worlds were hosted within its walls. In 807 the hermit saints Benignus and Carus stayed there, while in the 13th century its monks included Blessed Evangelista, Pellegrino and Albertino da Verona, the latter of whom was sent in 1264 to preach in England. In later centuries Bishop Teobaldo Fabri, Onofrio Panvinio, Giuseppe Panfilo (future bishop of Segni) and Enrico Noris were housed there. The monastery could boast a valuable library founded in 1387 and inside which, in 1784, the theologian and jurist Paolo Canciani found a 10th-century codex containing Lombard legal texts.

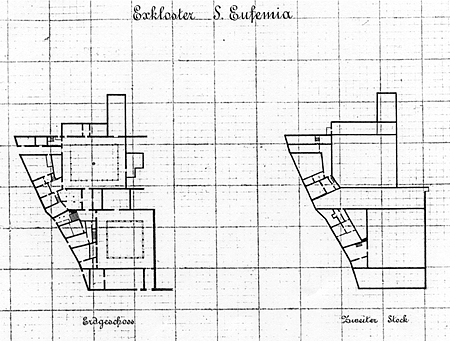
Planimetry of the ground and second floors including both cloisters, made by k.k. Genie-Direktion Verona in the 19th century.

In 1796 the Napoleonic army used the church and monastery as a military hospital, and ten years later the convent was finally suppressed and became state property. Between 1814 and 1866, during Austrian rule, the military use of the monastery was thus maintained, for which various accommodations and adaptations necessary for the various uses were made: the use as infantry barracks and as a warehouse for hospital supplies are documented; after 1849 the establishment of the offices of the I.R. Civil and Military Government; and finally the use as a cookie warehouse for the army. From 1878, with the city's transition to Italian administration, the convent buildings were used instead as an educational institution.

The convent complex was severely damaged by aerial bombardment during World War II and by the destruction of the nearby Victory Bridge, which was mined in 1945. Of the older (rectangular) cloister, perhaps only the wing adjacent to the church remains, while the rest was rebuilt as the site of the “Paolo Caliari” middle school. The seventeenth-century cloister, on the other hand, was restored by the Superintendence in 1947.

== See also ==
- Churches of Verona
- Roman Catholic Diocese of Verona
- Monuments of Verona

== Bibliography ==
- Giorgio Borelli, ed. (1980). Chiese e monasteri di Verona. Verona: Banca Popolare di Verona.
- Andrea Brugnoli; Gian Maria Varanini, eds. (2008). Magna Verona vale: studi in onore di Pierpaolo Brugnoli. Verona: La grafica.
- Nelly Zanolli Gemi (1991). Sant'Eufemia: storia di una chiesa e del suo convento a Verona. Verona: Progei Editori.
- Nelly Zanolli Gemi (1992). Santa Eufemia. Verona: Edizioni B.P.V.
- Giuseppe Franco Viviani (2004). Chiese nel Veronese. Verona: Società cattolica di assicurazione.
- Gianfranco Benini (1988). Le chiese di Verona: guida storico-artistica. Arte e natura libri.
- Alberto Maria Sartori (2016). Sant'Eufemia: arte e architettura tra fede e storia.
- Umberto Gaetano Tessari (1955). La chiesa di Santa Eufemia. Verona: Edizioni di Vita veronese.
