= Saint Sophia Cathedral, Polotsk =

Cathedral in Polotsk, Belarus

Cathedral of Saint Sophia
- Сафійскі сабор
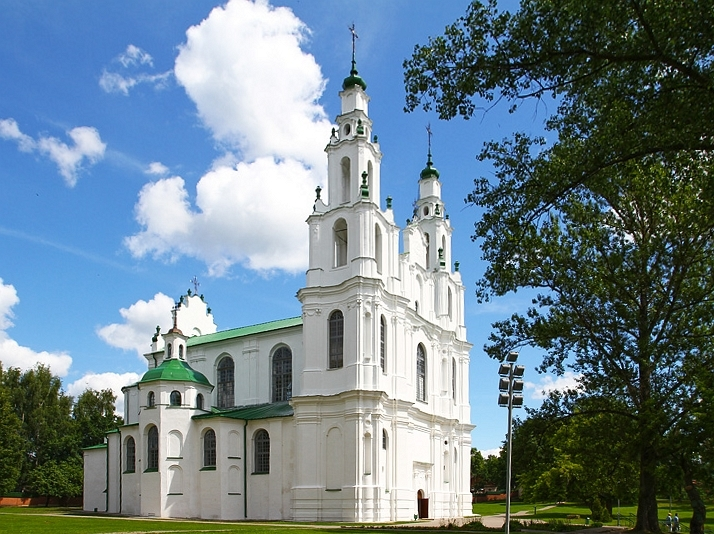
- Interactive map of the Cathedral of Saint Sophia area

General information
- Location: Polotsk, Belarus
- Coordinates: 55°29′11″N 28°45′31″E
- Construction started: 1738
- Completed: 1750

Design and construction
- Architect: Johann Christoph Glaubitz / Guido Antonio Longhi / Aleksander Osikiewicz

The Cathedral of Saint Sophia (Belarusian: Полацкі Сафійскі сабор, romanized: Polacki Safijski sabor) is a former religious building in Polotsk, Belarus, that was built by Prince Vseslav of Polotsk between 1044 and 1066, now serving as a concert hall. It stands at the confluence of the Polota River and the Western Dvina River on the eastern side of the city and is probably the oldest church in Belarus.

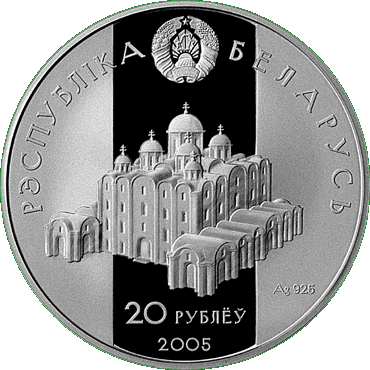
The presumed original appearance of the cathedral (as depicted in 2005 on a 20 ruble silver commemorative coin). Vseslav of Polotsk, the cathedral's patron, is shown on the reverse.

== History ==
=== Early history ===
The cathedral is named after the Holy Wisdom of God, similar to the Saint Sophia Cathedral in Kyiv and Saint Sophia Cathedral in Novgorod. After building his own cathedral, Vseslav, who was an izgoi prince, tried to seize the Kyivan throne. Failing in that attempt, he raided the surrounding principalities. In 1067, he raided Novgorod the Great and looted the Cathedral of Holy Wisdom, bringing a bell and other looting back to decorate his own Cathedral of Holy Wisdom. The cathedral is mentioned in The Tale of Igor's Campaign, where it says that Vseslav would make nocturnal trips to Kyiv as a werewolf and would hear the bells of Holy Wisdom at Polotsk as they rang for matins.

The cathedral has been significantly rebuilt and heavily modified between the eleventh and eighteenth centuries. Indeed, only parts of the church date back to the time of Vseslav, although the names of the builders are inscribed in a stone at the base of the cathedral: David, Toma, Mikula, Kopes, Petr, and Vorish. The burial vaults of 16 Polotsk princes dating back to the eleventh century have been uncovered (indeed, Vseslav himself, said to have been a sorcerer as well as a werewolf, was buried in the cathedral he built). According to the Voskresenskaia Letopis (s.a. 1156), the cathedral originally had seven domes, later reduced to five after it was rebuilt following the fire of 1447. From 1596–1654 and 1668–1839, it served as the cathedral church of the Archeparchy of Polotsk–Vitebsk in the Ruthenian Uniate Church. It was rebuilt again in 1618–1620 by a Greek Catholic Archbishop St. Josaphat Kuntsevych (rr. 1618–1623) following a fire in 1607, and again after a fire destroyed the cathedral and the city in 1643.

=== Baroque church ===
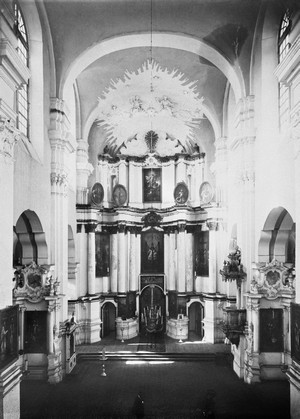
A vintage photograph of the interior

In 1705–1710, Peter the Great and Aleksandr Menshikov used the church as a Powder House, which later exploded. Over the next almost three decades (1738–1765), the Uniate archbishop, Florian Hrebnicki, was rebuilding the cathedral.

In 1738, he signed a contract with a master mason from Warsaw, Błażej Kosiński. The identity of the designer is unknown. According to Stanisław Lorentz, it was Johann Christoph Glaubitz, who built a palace in Struń for the bishop in 1749. Following this assumption Glaubitz is often attributed as the main achictect of the new cathedral, which is an example of the Vilnian Baroque style. Mariusz Karpowicz challenges this thesis, pointing out that in 1738 Johann Christoph Glaubitz was only just beginning his activity in Vilnius, initially working as a mason. The Polotsk cathedral also differs stylistically from his undisputed works. Karpowicz identifies Guido Antonio Longhi, the designer of the Church of the Holy Trinity in Kobyłka, as the original author of the project, Glaubitz was according to him responsible for finishing the project and interior decoration. Marian Morelowski identifies Aleksander Osikiewicz as the designer.

Currently, it is a baroque structure with towers and the domes have being removed (or at least not rebuilt). The cathedral used to have a library and other important cultural artifacts, but the library was destroyed when King Stephen Báthory of Poland took the city during the Livonian War in the late 16th century. The town was occupied by the French during the Napoleonic Invasion of 1812 (indeed, two battles were fought at Polotsk in August and October, the second seeing house-to-house fighting). It was also occupied during the Nazi Invasion in the 1940s, when a large number of Polotsk's inhabitants were slaughtered.

The cathedral has changed functions several times over the centuries. With the Union of Brest, the church became the cathedral of the Ruthenian Catholic Archeparchy of Polotsk–Vitebsk. During the Russo-Polish War of 1654–1667, the church was taken by the Russian troops of Tsar Alexei Mikhailovich, who visited the cathedral in 1654. In 1668, the cathedral again passed to the Greek Catholics and remained as such until 1839 when Bishop Joseph Siemaszko terminated the union and transferred jurisdiction to the Russian Orthodox Church. During the Soviet period, the cathedral housed the Polotsk Regional State Archive (from 1949 to 1954.) In 1967, the restoration work took place as the cathedral was to be turned into a museum of atheism, but the museum was moved to Vitebsk in 1969. The cathedral is now part of the State Museum-Preserve of Polotsk and used as a concert hall with an organ. There is an ongoing conversation of returning the building to the Russian Orthodox Church.

== See also ==
- Saint Sophia Cathedral in Kyiv
- Saint Sophia Cathedral in Novgorod
- Hagia Sophia
- Cathedral of the Theotokos, Vilnius

== Bibliography ==
- Garbus, Tamara (2011). "Architektura cerkwi unicki na Białorusi w kontekście wileńskiego baroku" [The Wilno Variety of the 18th-Century Architecture]. Biuletyn Historii Sztuki. 73 (3–4).
- Karpowicz, Mariusz (2011). "Wileńska odmiana architektury XVIII wieku" [The Wilno Variety of the 18th-Century Architecture]. Biuletyn Historii Sztuki. 73 (3–4).
