= Guido Antonio Longhi =

Italian architect active in Poland

Guido Antonio Longhi (born 9 May 1691, died 21 July 1756) was an Italian architect and a representative of the late Baroque who worked in Poland and Lithuania in the years 1741–1747.

Guido Antonio Longhi was born on 9 May 1691 in Viggiù in Italy. Longhi became known for his architectural activity in the territory of the Polish–Lithuanian Commonwealth.

== Biography ==
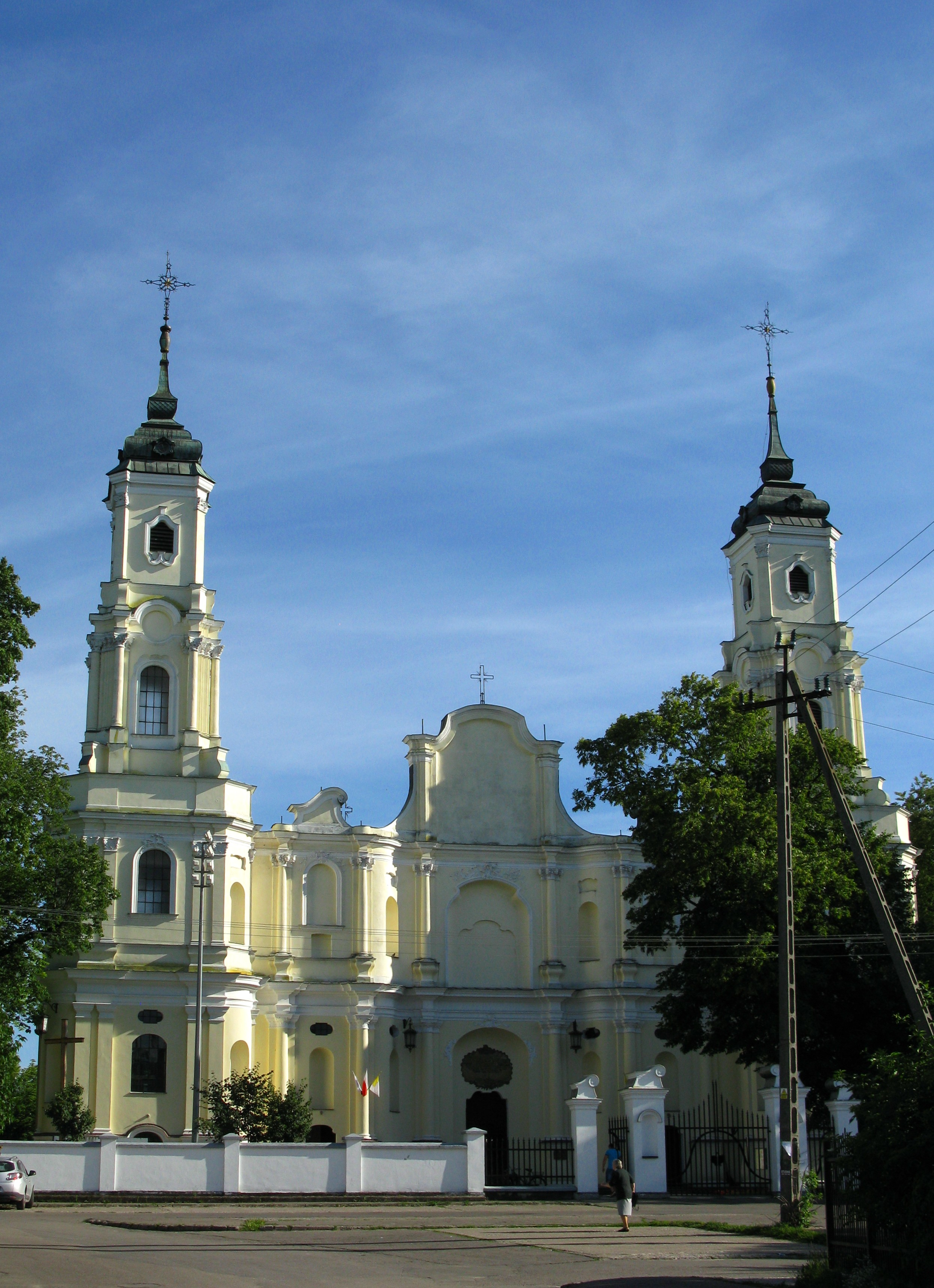
Holy Trinity Church in Kobyłka

He was born on 9 May 1691 in Viggiù, near Lake Lugano. His parents were Bernardo Longhi (son of Guido) and Mabilia Buzzi (daughter of Francesco). He arrived in the Polish–Lithuanian Commonwealth before 1740, following the path of many architects from this region of Lombardy, especially those from the Fontana family, who worked in Poland.

His most important work in Poland is the Church of the Holy Trinity in Kobyłka, built at the commission of Bishop of Płock Marcin Załuski. It is an outstanding Rococo work in Longhi’s characteristic style, later echoed in works of the Vilnius Baroque. Built in 1740–1745 church in Kobyłka was to a large extent modelled on the Basilica of Superga near Turin, a work by Filippo Juvarra, completed in 1717. It also shares stylistic features with the Santissima Trinità Church in Crema, completed before 1740 and likewise attributed to Longhi.

He designed the reconstruction of the churches in Łask and Brzeźnio. The Gothic church in Łask burned down in 1749, and Bishop Marcin Załuski commissioned its reconstruction according to Longhi’s plans. The church was rebuilt in the Gothic form, featuring a simplified Baroque façade but a richly decorated Baroque interior. The church in Brzeźnio was constructed in 1755–1758 according to Longhi’s plans. In Poland, besides working for the Bishop of Płock, he also worked for his brother, the Bishop of Chełmno (later of Kraków), Andrzej Stanisław Kostka Załuski. It is possible that the Franciscan Observant Church at Karczówka near Kielce is also a work of Longhi, who stayed in Kielce in 1747–1748 as a guest at the palace of the Bishop of Kraków.

At the end of 1749 he returned to Viggiù, where in 1751 he married Barbara Buzzi. He died on 21 July 1756.

The church in Kobyłka is the only work of Longhi that can be attributed to him with certainty; all the others are ascribed to him on the basis of stylistic similarities. The undulating lines of the façades, openwork towers with numerous openings and large windows, moulded window and doorway frames, as well as the forms of arches and niches, were innovative solutions not only in the Polish–Lithuanian Commonwealth but also in his native region. Kobyłka is a considered a Gesamtkunstwerk of Longhi.

According to Mariusz Karpowicz, Longhi was an exceptional artist, and elements characteristic of his style found followers among the creators of the Vilnius Baroque. Karpowicz attributes to Longhi the design and supervision of the initial works (begun in 1738) at the Cathedral of St. Sophia in Polotsk for Bishop Florian Hrebnicki. He also credits him with the Franciscan Church in Ivyanyets (1736) and the Bernardine Church in Minsk (1741).

== Bibliography ==
- Guttmejer, Karol (2006). Guido Antonio Longhi. Działalność architektoniczna w Polsce. Warsaw.
- Kamuntavičius, Rūstis; Sargent Noyes, Ruth (2021). "Lugano lake artists in the northernmost heart of eighteenth-century Catholic baroque art: Guido Antonio Longhi and members of the Paracca family". Review of Institute of the Grand Duchy of Lithuania. 1.
- Karpowicz, Mariusz (2011). "Wileńska odmiana architektury XVIII wieku" [The Wilno Variety of the 18th-Century Architecture]. Biuletyn Historii Sztuki. 73 (3–4).
