= Bartolomeo Signorini =

Italian painter

Bartolomeo Signorini (1674–14 March 1742) was an Italian painter of the late-Baroque, active in mainly in Verona, Republic of Venice.

He was born and trained in Verona under Santo Prunati and later Giambettino Cignaroli. In a review of Veronese painters, he is described as:

as a man of value (who gave) evident signs of not vulgar ingenuity. He invented with spirit, drew manually, but not disproportionately, colored reasonably, and knotted the drapery with panache ... but as he idled and dreamed of new ways, he set out from the good path, and he made certain paintings in a truly barbaric manner, especially over the last few years ... he abandoned himself to a race of idleness: procuring sooner to patch up old paintings, and buy, and resell them together with his friend Baroni.

He appears to have met criticism for an altarpiece he painted for the church of San Bovo, and painted less.
