= Holy Trinity Church, Kobyłka =

Minor Basilica of the Holy Trinity in Kobyłka
- Bazylika Świętej Trójcy w Kobyłce
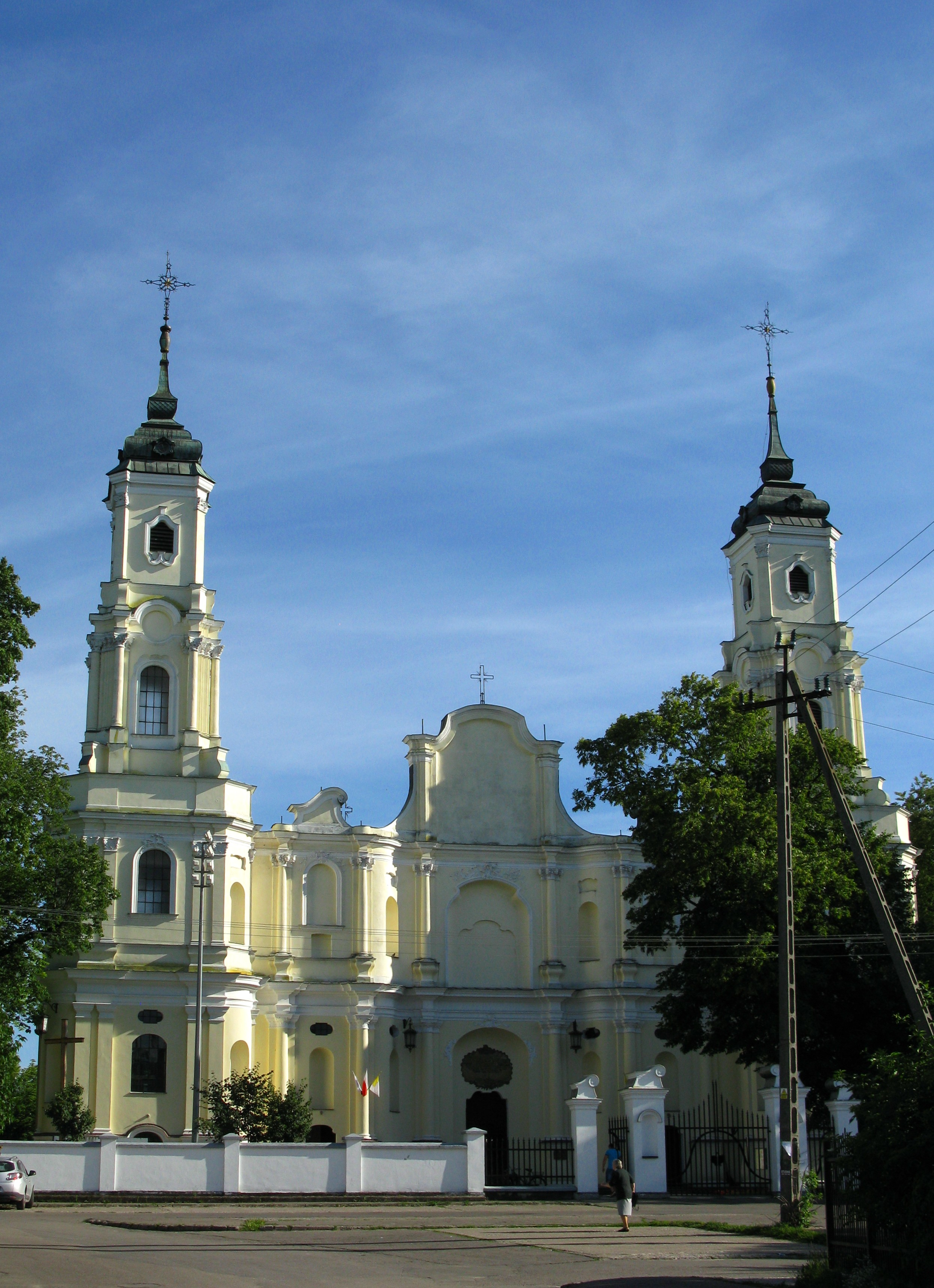
- Minor Basilica of the Holy Trinity in Kobyłka
- 52°20′23″N 21°11′43″E
- Location: Kobyłka, Poland
- Denomination: Roman Catholic Church
- Tradition: Latin Church
- Website: http://www.trojca.org.pl/

History
- Status: Parish church
- Dedication: Holy Trinity
- Consecrated: 6 August 1741

Architecture
- Functional status: Active
- Heritage designation: Cultural heritage monument
- Designated: 1 December 1953
- Architect: Guido Antonio Longhi
- Architectural type: Church
- Style: Baroque
- Completed: 1736–1740

Administration
- Diocese: Roman Catholic Diocese of Warsaw-Praga
- Parish: Holy Trinity Parish in Kobyłka

The Minor Basilica of the Holy Trinity in Kobyłka is a Roman Catholic church located in Kobyłka near Warsaw, Poland. It represents the Late Baroque architectural style.

== History ==
The parish in Kobyłka was established in 1415. The earliest churches, dedicated to Saint Anne, were wooden and were destroyed by fires. The current, brick church was built between 1736 and 1740 according to the design and under the personal supervision of the Lombard architect Guido Antonio Longhi. The founder of the construction was Bishop Marcin Załuski, who also consecrated the church in 1741. Longhi referred in his architectural design to the Basilica of Superga near Turin, which was particularly evident in the original form of the towers. A strong similarity can also be seen with the Church of the Holy Trinity in Crema, which, although most often attributed to Andrea Nono, was probably the last work of Guido Antonio Longhi before he left Italy.

After 1742 the vault of the main nave and the walls of the presbytery were decorated with frescoes by Grzegorz Łodziński. In 1773, following the Suppression of the Society of Jesus, the Jesuits left Kobyłka. In 1794 the eastern tower was destroyed during the Kościuszko Uprising. In 1811–1812, Napoleonic soldiers were stationed in the church and destroyed its original interior furnishings.

In 1944 the retreating German army blew up the western tower. The church was rebuilt under the supervision of architect Bruno Zborowski between 1947 and 1949, with some changes to the shape of the tower and windows.

Between 1958 and 1961 the church interiors were restored by conservators Władysława and Konstanty Tiunin. In 1971 a candle left by a thief caused a fire that destroyed the main altar together with the painting The Last Supper on the door of the tabernacle. Between 1971 and 1977 the interior was reconstructed, and the eastern tower was completed following the model of the western one.

== Bibliography ==
- Karpowicz, Mariusz (2011). "Wileńska odmiana architektury XVIII wieku" [The Wilno Variety of the 18th-Century Architecture]. Biuletyn Historii Sztuki. 73 (3–4).
