= Giovanni Battista Lorenzi (painter) =

Italian painter

Giovanni Battista Lorenzi (Verona, 1741– January 27, 1773) was an Italian painter of the Rococo period.

== Biography ==
He trained in Verona under Gianbettino Cignaroli. He mainly painted sacred subjects and some portraits. He died from alcoholism.
