= Saverio Dalla Rosa =

Italian painter (1741–1821)

Saverio Dalla Rosa (1 June 1741 – 7 December 1821) was an Italian painter, active mainly in Verona.

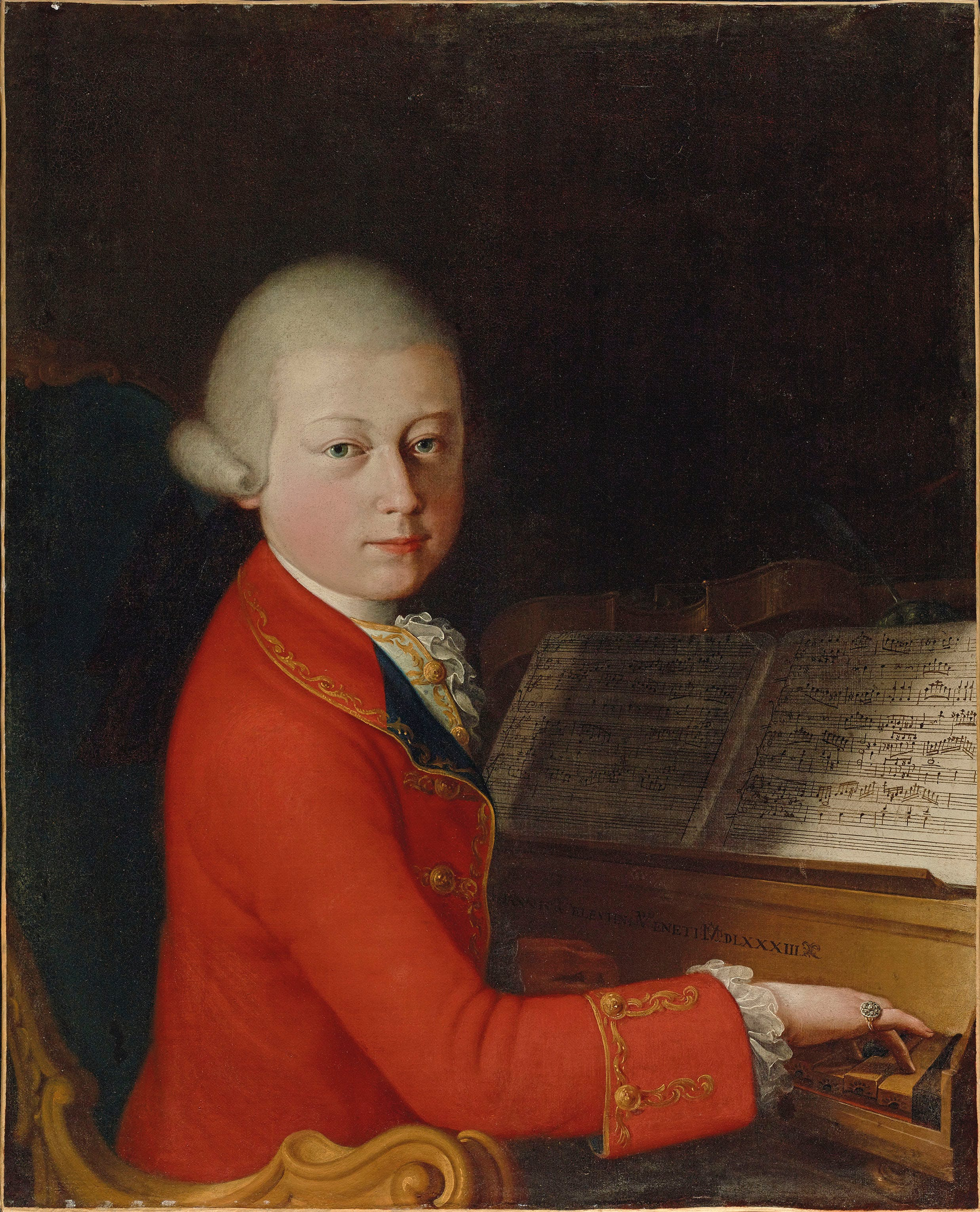
Mozart, aged 14, in Verona, 1770, by Saverio Dalla Rosa

== Biography ==
He was born in Verona, and trained there under Giambettino Cignaroli, his maternal uncle. He painted sacred subjects and portraits, including one of the young Mozart. He painted frescoes for the Casa Nicolini in Verona. He sent an Annunciation to the Catholic church in St Petersburg, Russia. He became a member of the Accademia Clementina in Bologna.

In 1806, he wrote a book titled Scuola veronese di pittura, where he lists himself as professor of painting, member of the Accademia Clementina, Director of the Academy of painting, sculpture, in Verona.

== Bibliography ==
- Zannandreis, Diego (1891). Giuseppe Biadego (ed.). Le vite dei pittori, scultori e architetti veronesi. Verona: Stabilimento Tipo-Litografico G. Franchini. pp. 490–492.
