= Felice Cappelletti =

Italian painter (1656–1738)

Felice Cappelletti (1656–1738) was an Italian painter of the Late-Baroque, active mainly in Verona, Republic of Venice.

He was born and trained in Verona under Santo Prunati. He contributed paintings to the churches of Santa Caterina presso Ognissanti, Sant’Anastasia, and Santi Apollonia e Margherita in Verona. Many works were lost during the French occupation of Verona.

== Works ==
- Christ washing feet of Apostles, Oratory of San Simone Apostolo, Verona
- Rescue of St Peter, Parish church of Santi Pietro e Paolo, Torri del Benaco
- Angel destroys Idols, Parish church of Santi Pietro e Paolo, Torri del Benaco
- Dream of Saint Joseph, Accademia di Belle Arti Tadini, Lovere
