= Maria Suppioti Ceroni =

Italian artist (born 1730)

Maria Suppioti Ceroni (1730 – c. 1773) was an Italian pastellist.

Born Maria Suppioti in Vicenza, republic of Venice, Ceroni produced portraits and religious and mythological scenes and was active as an engraver as well. Her instructor was Giambettino Cignaroli. She was a member of the Verona Academy and was active in that city as well. She married one Ceroni in 1755. She is the subject of a poem by Giovanni Anastasio Pozzobon.
