= Cignaroli Academy and Brenzoni School of Painting and Sculpture =

Academy of Fine Arts

Coordinates: 45.4348°N 10.9930°E

- Established: 1764
- Address: Via San Carlo, 5, Verona, Italy
- Website: https://www.accademia-cignaroli.it/
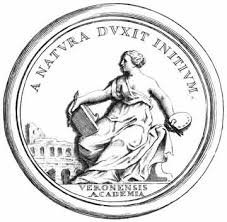

The Cignaroli Academy, based in Verona, was established in 1764 with the transformation of the ancient Academy of Drawing into a public institution. It is one of the five historic Italian academies. Giambettino Cignaroli was its first director, from its establishment until his death in 1770.

== History ==
The establishment of the Academy of Painting of Verona on December 18, 1764, under the auspices of Giambettino Cignaroli (1706-1770), an acclaimed painter well beyond local borders, marked the recognition of the Veronese school of painting, heir to a long and prestigious tradition. It is documented that already during the eighteenth century, artists and noble "amateurs" gathered in a "Veronese Academy of Drawing" to practice drawing from live models in private residences made available by the academicians. Among them were Count Alessandro Pompei, a painter and architect, and Marquis Scipione Maffei, a scholar who profoundly influenced Veronese culture during the Enlightenment. The association with Maffei, who had established the first public museum in Europe in Verona, may have inspired Cignaroli to institutionalize the "Academy of Drawing" with an annual contribution from the Municipality of Verona and the use of a municipally owned building.

Approved by the Venetian Senate at the beginning of 1765, the academic statutes enabled the Veronese Academy of Painting to begin its activities with Cignaroli as the "perpetual director", three presidents, three "Masters of Painting" appointed annually, and thirty-three painters associated as founders. Initially in today's vicolo Ghiaia, granted for free by the Municipality, in 1765, the academy moved to an apartment in "Corte de' Cavallari", facing the current Piazzetta Navona, where the "nude room" was set up based on a design by Alessandro Pompei. On February 17, 1766, the City Council decided to mark the opening of the Academy with an official ceremony. Father Ippolito Bevilacqua of the Oratory of Verona delivered the inaugural address; Girolamo Pompei, appointed as the perpetual secretary of the Academy, composed a celebratory song in seven stanzas. The two texts were then published in a booklet that has become extremely rare today.

While he was engaged as a cataloger and conservator of Veronese artistic heritage, then threatened by Napoleonic suppressions, and was working on the ambitious project of an illustrated history of Veronese painting, Dalla Rosa endeavored to reorganize the Academy, equipping it with new teaching tools and selecting paintings by old masters that would form the core of the public art gallery, set up in 1812 in the City Council hall (then in the Loggia di Fra Giocondo). One of the interim locations assigned to the Academy during those years is depicted in the etching illustrating the small 1823 volume Capitoli dell'Accademia di Pittura e Scultura in Verona and in the painting "Night Study from Life at the Academy of Fine Arts of Verona" by Carlo Canella, recently acquired by the ancient institution.

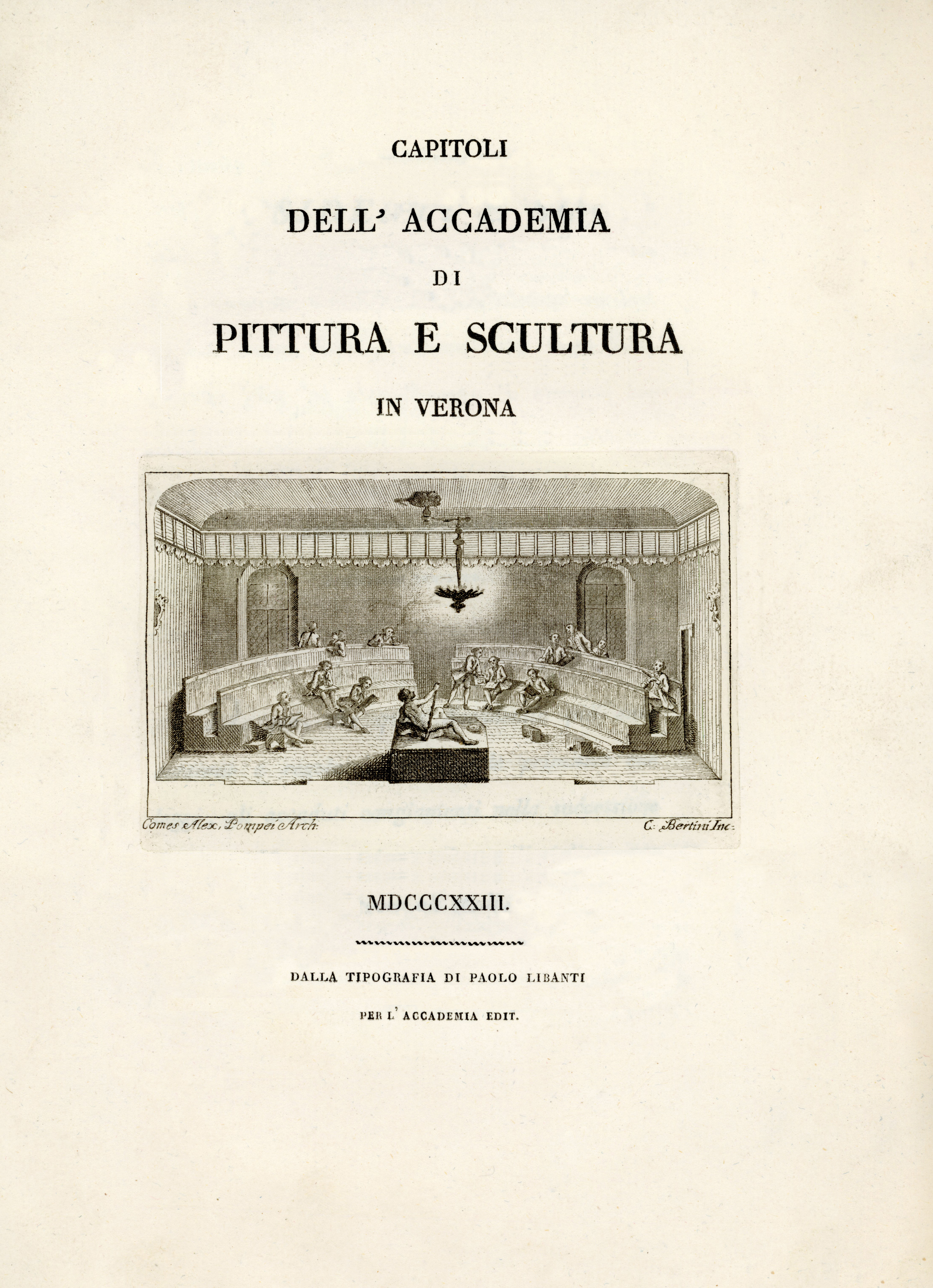
Title page of the book Capitoli dell'Accademia di Pittura e Scultura in Verona published in 1823

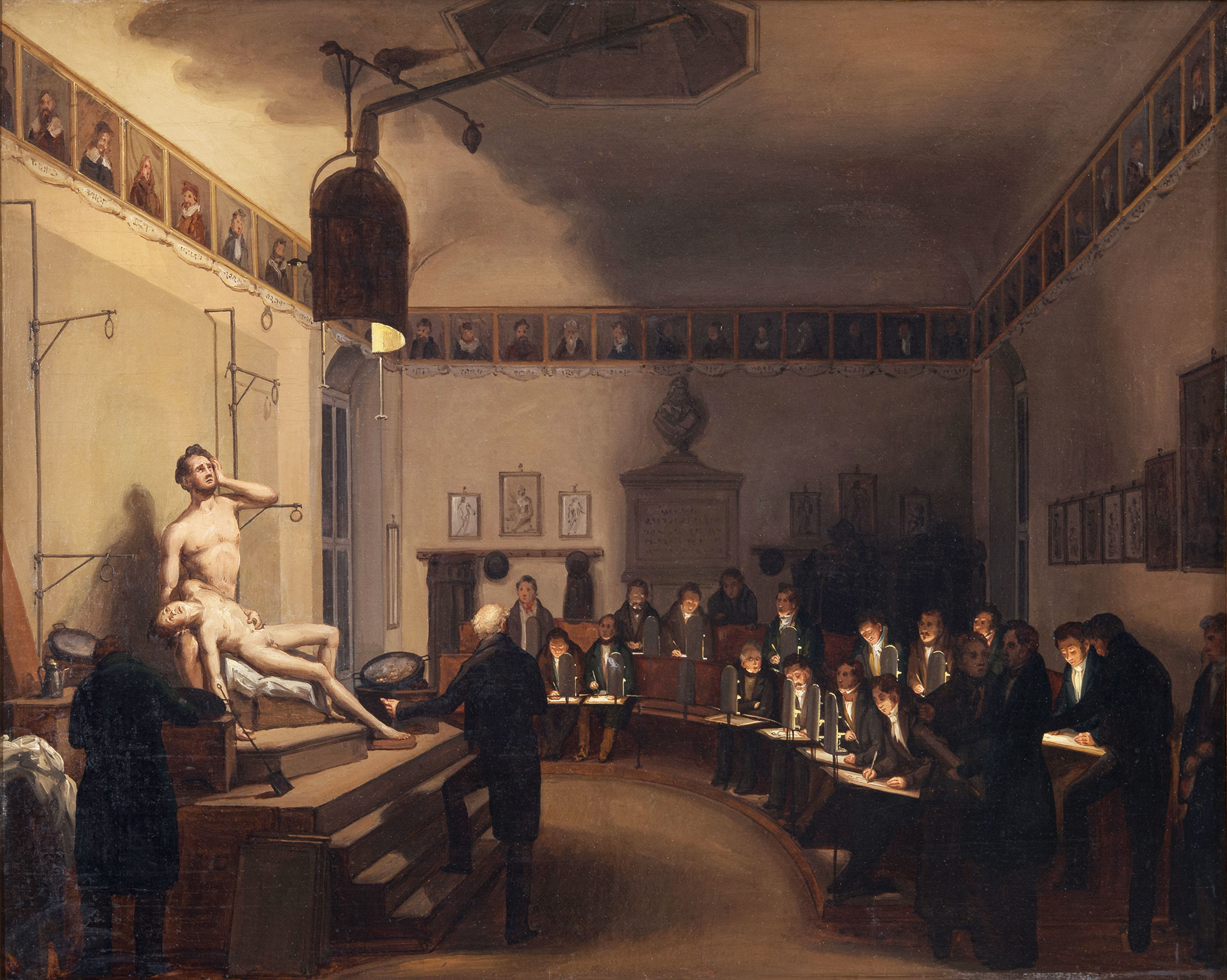
Carlo Canella, Studio notturno dal vero nell'Accademia di Belle Arti di Verona, circa 1827, Giambettino Cignaroli Academy and Brenzoni School of Painting and Sculpture, Verona

The Academy, however, would only be adjacent to the museum starting in 1856, as was the case for many important Italian academic institutions, when it was moved to the Sanmicheli-designed Palazzo Pompei alla Vittoria, which at that time housed the Civic Museum in its rooms.

During the subsequent period of Austrian rule, the Academy did not have an easy time, affected by the vicissitudes of the Risorgimento (including the suspension of activities from 1848 to 1851); the most significant event was the bequest by academic member Count Paolo Brenzoni in 1853. He left the Municipality of Verona important real estate to generate a perpetual income for the establishment of "a public, free School of Painting and Sculpture in Verona, conducted and directed by one of the most distinguished Italian painters and illustrators", on the condition that the School would retain his name and adopt his family's coat of arms. The new Statute of the Cignaroli Academy and Brenzoni School of Painting and Sculpture—this was the new name of the Institution—was approved by the City Council on December 18, 1896. The Brenzoni bequest was complemented by additional bequests from private individuals to support competitions for works of painting and sculpture, such as the Perini bequest (1869) and the Bovio bequest (1921).

In the years leading up to Verona's annexation to the Kingdom of Italy, many young people preferred to seek success in other Italian cities. One was Vincenzo Cabianca, who, after initial training at the Veronese Academy, moved first to Venice, then to Bologna, and finally to Florence, where he joined the Macchiaioli group. In the 1870s, the Veronese Academy distinguished itself thanks to a strengthening of the institution made possible by Count Paolo Brenzoni's bequest. After a national competition, Napoleone Nani (1841-1899), a "verist" Venetian, was called to direct the school and teach painting. He brought to Verona the modern teaching experience of the Venice Academy, which had been reformed by Pietro Selvatico. Among his students were Alessandro Milesi, Angelo Dall'Oca Bianca, and Vincenzo De' Stefani, who would go on to win great acclaim at international exhibitions at the end of the century.

=== Activity in the 20th century ===
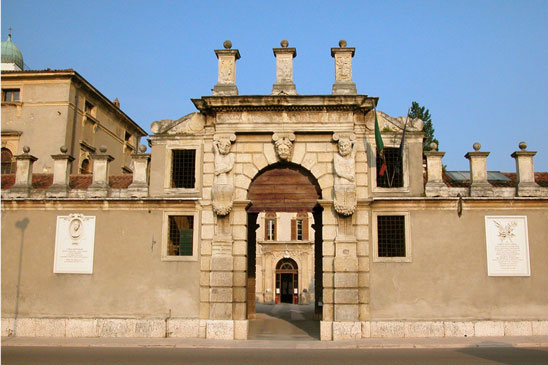
Palazzo Verità Montanari, headquarters assigned to the Academy in 1947

An extraordinary vitality characterized the Academy in the first quarter of the 20th century when, under the leadership of Mosè Bianchi for a brief period, the Bolognese Alfredo Savini (1868-1924) was called to helm the institution, later assisted by the divisionist Baldassare Longoni. Many talented painters emerged during those years, including Antonio Nardi, Guido Trentini, Ettore Beraldini, Giuseppe Zancolli, Angelo Zamboni, and Pino Casarini. They had the opportunity to interact with Felice Casorati during his time in Verona and with the group of artists from Ca' Pesaro. By the mid-1920s, at the Cignaroli Academy, where Antonio Nardi succeeded Savini and Egidio Girelli taught sculpture, personalities such as Giacomo Manzù and Fiorenzo Tomea, Sandro Bini and Renato Birolli, intersected. Even after Birolli's move to Milan, he remained connected to the artistic circles of his hometown.

In 1924, the Art Lyceum was annexed to the Academy, and after its equivalence was recognized in 1962, it was finally nationalized in 1967. It wasn't until 1978 that the lyceum established its own new headquarters in Via delle Coste in Verona, definitively separating from the Academy.

In 1937, Achille Forti, a botanist and patron of the arts, donated his palace in the current Via Forti to the Municipality of Verona through a testamentary bequest. The ground floor was earmarked for use by the Academy of Fine Arts "G.B. Cignaroli" and the Brenzoni School, while the first floor was designated for the establishment of the Modern Art Gallery. On that occasion, the Municipality of Verona asked the Academy of Fine Arts "G.B. Cignaroli" and the Brenzoni School to make available a substantial group of works from their own collection, which are still on loan to the civic collection. In 1947, Mayor Aldo Fedeli (a deputy of the Constituent Assembly and mayor of Verona between 1945 and 1951), in accordance with the Forti bequest, assigned the Verità Montanari palace (at the current Via Carlo Montanari 5) as the headquarters of the Academy of Fine Arts "G.B. Cignaroli" and the Brenzoni School.

Starting from 1983 to 1984, under the leadership of then-President Prof. Renzo Chiarelli, legal recognition was gradually granted to numerous courses, while maintaining the planning of free courses aimed at students who, due to age or professional commitments, could not attend the regular curriculum. In the first decade of the 2000s, academic diplomas of the first and second levels were established.

The activity of the school is subsequently separated from the ancient institution and transferred to the Foundation Academy of Fine Arts of Verona, established in 2012, culminating in its nationalization in 2023.

In the meantime, the ancient Cignaroli Academy and Brenzoni School of Painting and Sculpture continue their activity focused on managing free courses. In 2013, it adopted a new statute that, following tradition, includes the appointment of representative bodies by the academic members.

In 2014, for the celebration of its 250th anniversary, the Cignaroli Academy initiated the restoration of the bas-relief and plaque affixed to the façade of the house at Via Roma 6, which housed Giambettino's studio.

Educational activities are overseen by established and renowned artists, not only nationally but also with cultural initiatives particularly focused on the visual arts sector.

== Directors ==
Giambettino Cignaroli was its first director until 1770. He was succeeded by Giovanni Battista Rusca until 1774, Francesco Lorenzi until 1780, Pietro Antonio Perotti until 1786, Angelo Da Campo, Saverio Dalla Rosa, until more recent times with Napoleone Nani, Mosè Bianchi, and Alfredo Savini from 1900 to 1924. They were succeeded in 1925 by Egidio Girelli as director and the painter Antonio Nardi in teaching painting, continuously from 1924 to 1965 (initially in collaboration with Guido Trentini).

== Bibliography ==
- Ippolito Bevilacqua, Girolamo Pompei, Aprendosi l'Accademia della pittura solennemente in Verona l'anno MDCCLXI, Verona, Moroni [1766].
- Ippolito Bevilacqua, Memorie della vita di Giambettino Cignaroli eccellente dipintor veronese, Verona, Moroni, 1771.
- Girolamo Pompei, Orazione in morte di Giambettino Cignaroli ed alcune poetiche composizioni sopra lo stesso argomento, Verona, Moroni, 1771.
- Capitoli dell'Accademia di Pittura e Scultura in Verona, Tipografia di Paolo Libanti, Verona, 1823.
- Gian Paolo Marchini, Le origini dell'Accademia di Pittura di Verona, in «Atti e memorie dell'Accademia di Agricoltura, Scienze e Lettere di Verona», VI, XXVII, 1975-1976.
- Gian Paolo Marchini, L'accademia di Pittura e Scultura di Verona, in P. Brugnoli (curated by) La pittura a Verona dal primo Ottocento a metà Novecento, Verona, Banca Popolare (Grafiche Fiorini), 1986.
- I pittori dell'Accademia di Verona (1764-1813), a cura di Luca Caburlotto, Fabrizio Magani, Sergio Marinelli, Chiara Rigoni, [Crocetta del Montello], Antiga, 2011.
- Giuseppina Dal Canton, La pittura del primo Novecento in Veneto (1900-1945), in La pittura in Italia. Il Novecento/1, curated by Carlo Pirovano, Electa, Milano, 1991, pp. 261–317
- Laura Lorenzoni, Verona, in La pittura nel Veneto. Il Novecento, Mondadori Electa, Milano, 2006, in 2 volumes, volume I, pp. 285–326
- Monica Saracino, Achille Forti, un binomio tra scienza e arte, in “Verona illustrata” n. 14, Verona, 2001.
