= Santi Prunati =

Italian painter (1652/1656–1728)

Santi Prunati (1652 or 1656 – 27 November 1728) was an Italian painter of the Baroque era, born and mainly active in Verona.

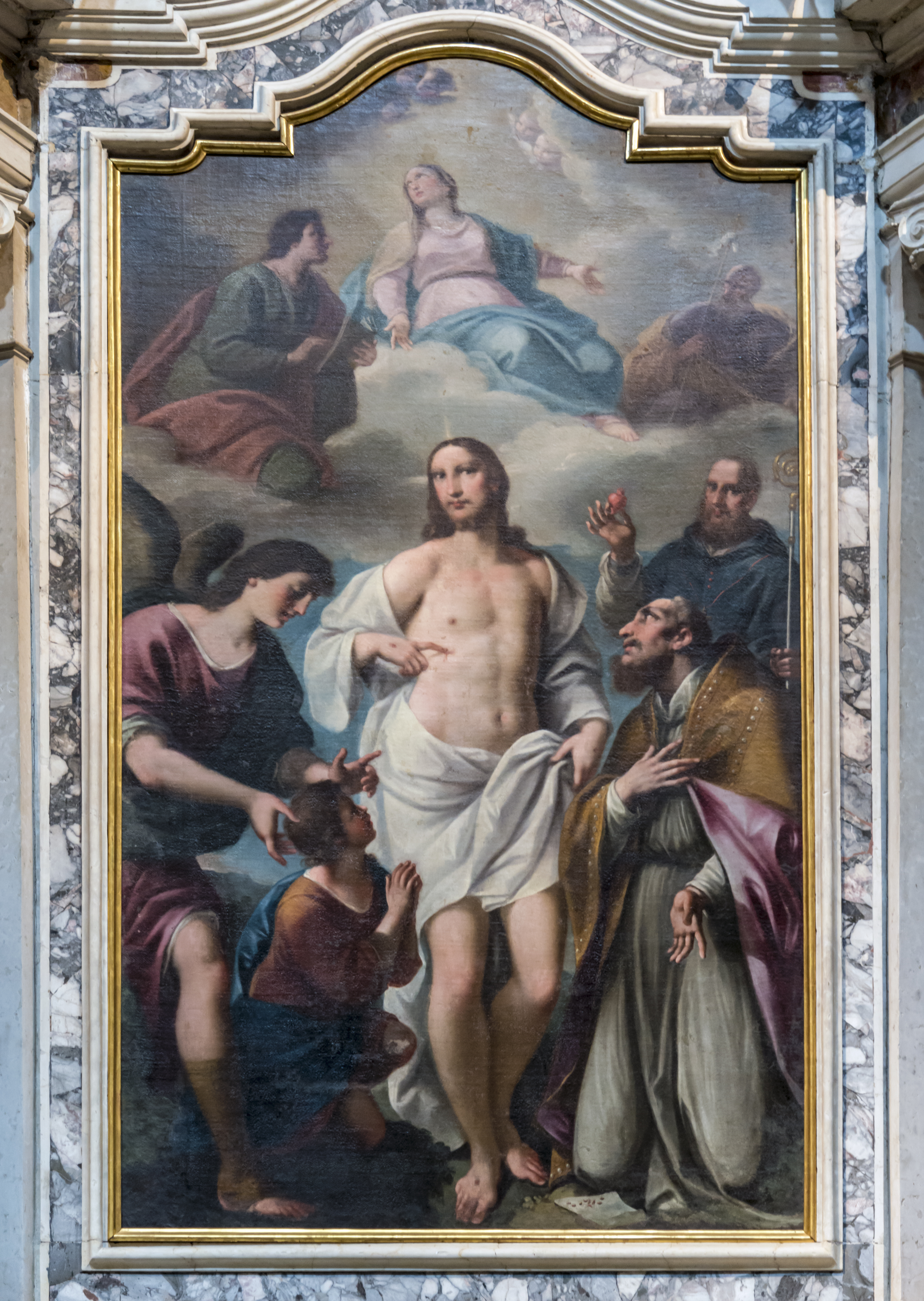
Christ between Tobias, the Angel and the Saints Liborio and Francis de Sales, Verona Cathedral

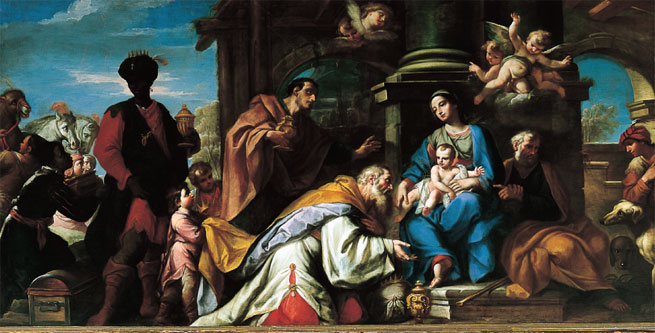
Adoration of the Magi, Basilica of Gandino

== Biography ==
He was born to Antonio Prunati, and baptized by 22 September. He originally studied with Andrea Voltolini, then with Biagio Falcieri. At age 19, he traveled to Vicenza to paint in the choir of San Jacopo and paint an altarpiece depicting St. Antony of Padua for the Basilica of Saints Felix and Fortunatus. He then traveled to Venice to work in the studio of Giovanni Carlo Loth.

He then traveled to Bologna to paint in various churches. He also traveled to Turin to paint in the palace of the Marchese de Pianezza. In 1717 he painted the large csnvas Adoration of the Magi for the basilica of Santa Maria Assunta in Gandino, near Bergamo. A Last Supper originally painted for St. Thomas Apostle, is now housed in the Castelvecchio Museum of Verona. He painted a Holy family with Saints Anne, young John the Baptist, and Donor Dal Pozzo for the apse of the church of San Lorenzo, Verona (likely copy of an earlier work by Raphael). Prunati died in Verona on 28 November 1728 and was buried in the curch of San Giovanni in Fonte. His son, Michelangelo, was also a painter. His pupils included Felice Torelli, Felice Cappelletti, Bartolomeo Signorini, Paolo Panelli, and his most famous pupil Gian Bettino Cignaroli.

== Sources ==
- Bryan, Michael (1889). Walter Armstrong; Robert Edmund Graves (eds.). Dictionary of Painters and Engravers, Biographical and Critical. Vol. II L-Z. London: George Bell and Sons. p. 327.
- Bernasconi, Cesare (1864). Painting Studi sopra la storia della pittura italiana dei secoli xiv e xv e della scuola pittorica veronese dai medi tempi fino tutto il secolo xviii. Googlebooks. p. 371.
- Church of San Lorenzo of Verona
- Zannandreis, Diego (1891). Giuseppe Biadego (ed.). Le vite dei pittori, scultori e architetti veronesi. Verona: Stabilimento Tipo-Litografico G. Franchini. pp. 297–298.
