= Santissima Trinità, Crema =

Church in Crema, Italy

Coordinates: 45.3615°N 9.6837°E

Church of the Holy Trinity
- Chiesa della Santissima Trinità
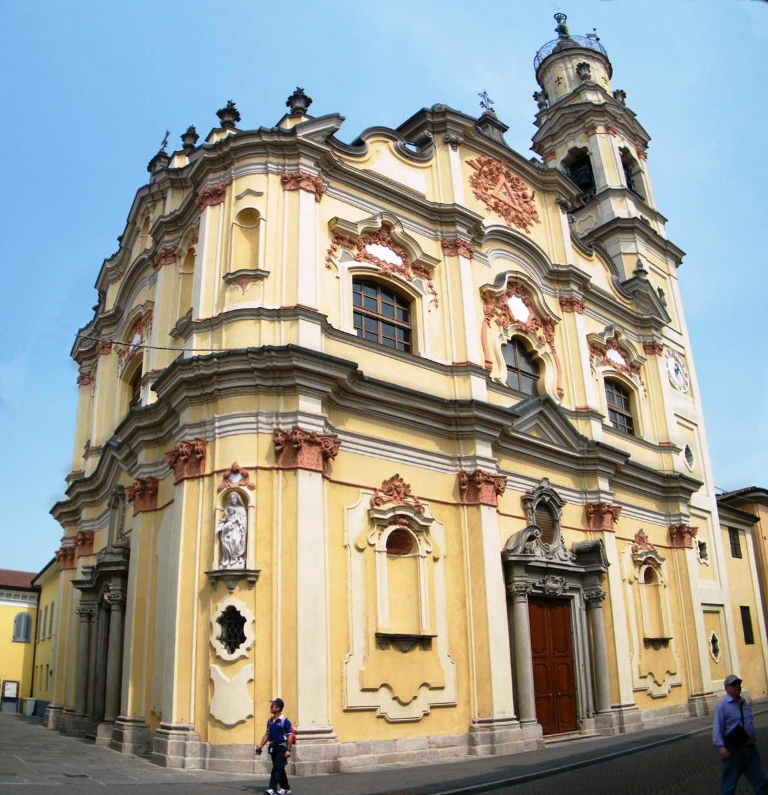
- Exterior of the Church of the Holy Trinity
- Church of the Holy Trinity
- Location: Crema, Province of Cremona, Lombardy, Italy
- Address: Via XX Settembre
- Denomination: Roman Catholic

History
- Status: Active
- Dedication: Holy Trinity
- Consecrated: 1740

Architecture
- Architect: Andrea Nono
- Style: Baroque
- Groundbreaking: 1737
- Completed: 1740

Administration
- Province: Diocese of Crema

The Church of the Holy Trinity is a religious building in the Baroque style located in the historic center of Crema, in the province of Cremona, Italy.

== History ==
=== The first centuries ===
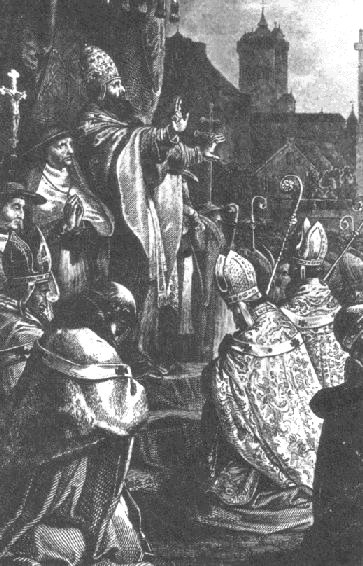
Pope Urban II

The first mention of the existence of a church dedicated to the Holy Trinity in Crema is a papal bull dated March 16, 1095, signed by Pope Urban II. It lists 133 monasteries under the jurisdiction of the Abbey of Cluny; among these there are also three monasteries in the Crema area: San Pietro near Ombriano, San Pietro di Madignano and the monastery of the Holy Trinity of Crema, all under the authority of the monastery of San Paolo d'Argon.

Therefore, in that year there was already a church and a monastery, certainly not prior to 920, the year in which the worship of the Holy Trinity was introduced by Stephen, bishop of Liège; the church could likely have been built between the end of the 10th century and the beginning of the 11th century; it is impossible to know when the Cluniacs settled there; to establish a direct link with the abbey of San Paolo d'Argon, this certainly took place after the year of foundation of the monastery in Bergamo by Ghisalberto in 1079.

Other known documents date back to the bulls of Pope Callixtus II (1120 and 1121) and Pope Honorius II (1125) in which the chapels and churches under the authority of San Paolo d'Argon are listed, while later it is known that some assets were transferred to Ombriano, Bagnolo Cremasco, Capergnanica and Chieve, while retaining control of the town church.

The church was probably destroyed (and later rebuilt) after the siege of Barbarossa in 1159/1160; in fact, a bull issued by Pope Alexander III in the year 1178 lists the dependencies of San Paolo d'Argon, also citing those that no longer belonged to it, but the Holy Trinity is not mentioned in it. During the reconstruction of the city (1185-1199) the area where the church once stood was included in the expansion of the protected area and a second church dedicated to the Holy Sepulchre began to be documented, located outside the defenses, probably built to provide spiritual support to the inhabitants living in the countryside just outside Porta Ombriano.

The monastery was inhabited by Cluniac monks perhaps until before the year 1314; in fact, in a document dated July 9 of that year, the name of the secular parish priest of San Sepolcro - Fasano da Lodi - is reported, residing, however, at the Santissima Trinità. Subsequent references to the parish priests of San Sepolcro also mention that they resided in a house adjacent to the urban church.

A bequest in the will of the nobleman Venturino Gambazocca dated 1393 allowed money to be set aside for its reconstruction: the reasons for this are deduced by the historian Terni who describes the building as fallen into ruin citing the year 1407. It was from this building - probably in ruins - in the year 1402 that Giovanni Antonio Marchi, considered the founder of a noble family from Crema, fired a shot from a catapult in the context of the struggle between the Guelph and Ghibelline factions, in the direction of the castle of Porta Ombriano, seriously wounding the leader of the Bergamo Ghibellines, Gentilino Soardo, who had come to the aid of the people of Crema.

From 1462 the church became the official seat of the parish, replacing the church of San Sepolcro, while in 1466 the monastery of San Paolo d'Argon was transformed into a commenda, entrusting it to the first commendatory, Monsignor Giovanni Battista Colleoni, apostolic protonotary and canon of the Bergamo cathedral. In 1477, he had to deal with the first urgent situation for the church in Crema: in fact, due to the consequences of an exceptional snowfall, the building collapsed again; therefore, with a deed dated June 30, 1479 the master mason Giuliano Ogliari was entrusted with the design of the new building, which was completed in 1486.

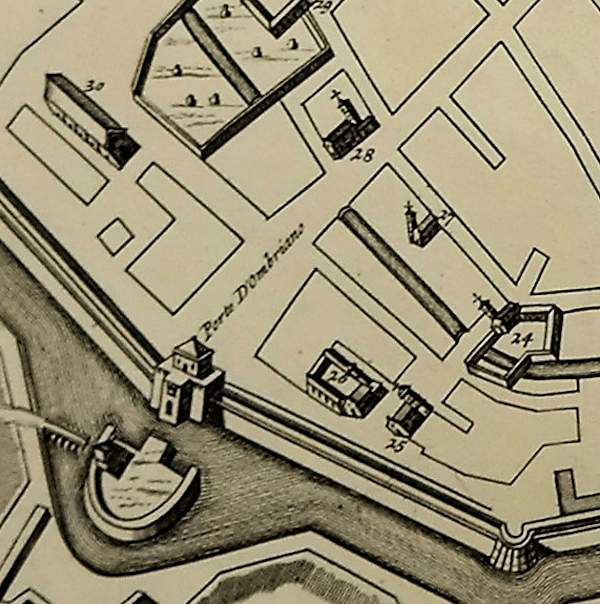
Detail of the map of Crema, etching by Pierre Mortier, 1708. At number 28 is the Church of the Holy Trinity

Monsignor Colleoni encouraged the transfer to Crema, in the Vicinia degli Spoldi, of the Cluniac Benedictine nuns who until 1489 lived in San Fabiano near Farinate; a place probably considered unsafe and remote, subject to raids by armies; however, as their numbers grew, they asked and obtained permission in 1493 to occupy the space of the convent of the Holy Trinity.

In 1498 Monsignor Colleoni renounced the commenda which was then ceded to the Cassinese monastery of Santa Giustina of Padua; the nuns, no longer having Benedictine representatives, obtained permission from Pope Leo X in 1507 to become Dominican nuns; they then had a new convent built in the area to the north of the old town center, which was incorporated into the new Venetian walls, and settled there after 1520. The various properties of the former commenda, on the other hand, were assigned to the dioceses and transformed into simple benefices.

=== From the eighteenth-century reconstruction to the present day ===
From the year 1515 the Consortium of the Blessed Sacrament, a confraternity, was active to promote the cult of the Eucharist, but it also carried out administrative and financial roles, increasing in importance over time, appointing "priors" from among its members. In 1736 they allocated the sum of 45,000 Venetian lire to build a new church, entrusting the project to the architect Andrea Nono; the following year demolition and rebuilding work began; however, during construction, noting the inadequacy of the previous bell tower in 1738 it was decided that architect Nono should be entrusted with the construction of a new tower.

The church was finished and consecrated in 1740 while the bell tower was completed the following year; the final costs rose to 89,000 Venetian lire due to both the construction of the new bell tower and the addition of the numerous pieces of marble used inside the church. There was also a dispute with the architect Nono, which was resolved through an agreement.

During the course of the 18th century, the interior decorations were entrusted to the Galliari brothers, followed by the frescoes and the completion of the altars. The pipe organ was installed in 1783 by the Serassi family (who also restored the instrument in 1835 and 1840). The current organ, however, was built by the Benzi e Franceschini company in 1909 and restored by the Inzoli company in 2006.

The windbreak rooms at the two entrances were created by Antonio Antolini in 1803, while the two pulpits by Giovanni Annessa date back to 1830.

In 1822 the body of St. Theodore the Martyr was laid to rest in the church, who, as stated in an explanatory picture, came from the catacombs of Saint Agnes in Rome and was brought to Crema by his father, Filippo Premoli, a Barnabite in 1761. It is a child's body and was placed in a cast urn in 1923 on the occasion of the centenary of the translation.

Significant conservative restoration work was undertaken in 1885, in the years 1954-1958, in the two-year periods 1982-1983 and 2004-2005.

In 2018 the pastoral unit was formed with the parish of the Crema Cathedral.

== Description ==
The church of the Holy Trinity, which the people of Crema familiarly call Santa Trìnita (with the accent on the first i), is located in the historic center parallel to the ancient Contrada di Porta Ombriano, an ancient place name in use until 1887 when a municipal resolution changed its name to Via XX Settembre to commemorate the entry of Italian troops into Rome and the fall of the temporal power of the pope (September 20, 1870).

=== Exterior ===
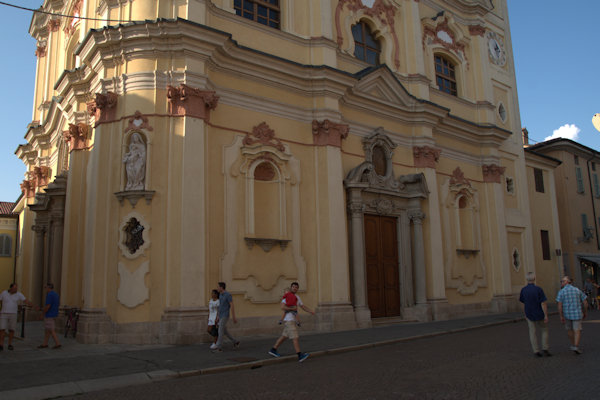
The lower order

Externally it is characterized by the peculiarity of having two facades; being in a confined space between houses, Andrea Nono devised this solution to give it visibility in the urban context. The design, typically baroque, is rather complex: a jutting entablature divides the two façades into two orders: in each of these, pilasters with faux brick capitals produce three mixtilinear panels. In the center of the lower order, two portals can be seen; along the sides of the facade along Via XX Settembre there are several niches that emerge from a projecting base and are equipped with corbels; in the basin there is a faux terracotta shell surmounted by a cymatium and a cartouche with an angel's head.

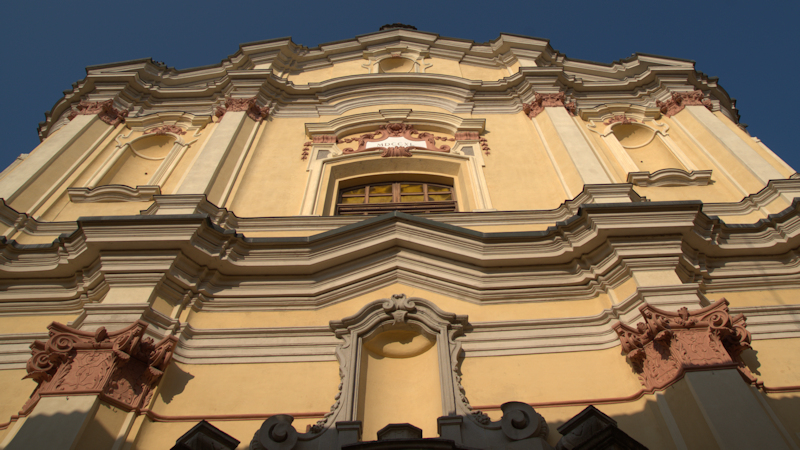
The upper order of the main facade

The two portals are similar and made of stone from the quarries of Osio and Brembate; they have two columns on a base, composite capitals and pulvini; they support a projecting entablature with two bases, perhaps with the never realized intention of placing statues on them. In the center there is a niche with volutes, a basin with a shell and a coping, also with volutes, with festoons at the sides. The side portal is different because in the middle there is an ellipsoidal window flanked by festoons and, below, a cartouche with the inscription:

Unum Deum in Trinitate veneramur
We worship one God in the Trinity

A high plinth supports the second order, again with pilasters in line with those of the lower order. The main facade has two niches with a coping and an angel's face in the side panels. In the center is a window with a mixtilinear cymatium containing the date of the end of construction, MDCCXL (1740). On the side facade, however, there are three very dynamic windows that contribute to the interior lighting, with arched architraves, festoons and cherubs' heads.

In the arched connection between the two façades are, from bottom to top: a panel in relief, a mixtilinear ovoid window, a niche with a cartouche in faux terracotta and a zoomorphic head. On the upper order there is another niche.

The two tympana are also very elaborate; the one on the main façade is triangular, divided into three sections with a central niche; it supports four pillars with amphora-shaped pinnacles made of sandstone and ceppo gentile stone. At the apex there is a spire with a cross.

The tympanum of the side facade is different, with a mixtilinear shape; in the center is a walled-in bas-relief (also in faux terracotta) with the symbol of the Trinity: a radiating triangle with the eye of God. There are two pinnacles with a cross in the center.

=== The bell tower ===
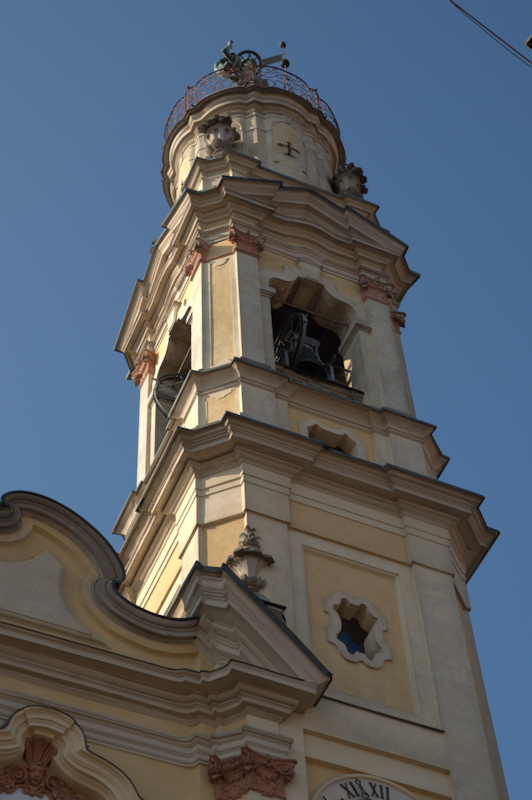
The bell tower

It is located on the right side, enclosed between the church and some of its dependencies; it was decided to rebuild it during the reconstruction of the building to maintain the same stylistic coherence. It has a square base of about 3 meters per side and is 37 meters high, excluding the statue of the Redeemer.

It is divided into two orders: the lower one, about as high as the church, has five panels on the side facing Via XX Settembre; on the east and south sides, there are mixtilinear windows in the center, while the clock face is located on the fourth panel, only on the southern side, of about 2.30 meters in diameter.

A projecting cornice leads to the second order, with a bell cell that follows the aesthetic scheme of the façade with pilasters with bases and capitals supporting a tripartite trabeation, shaped in the center. The openings, also with a mixtilinear shape, are equipped with balustrades.

Above this is a base with pinnacles supporting a circular structure decorated with round arches, and topped with an iron railing surrounding a curved copper roof. At the very top, the Redeemer is supported by a pivot that allows it to turn according to the direction of the wind; it is made of embossed copper with one arm raised, while the other supports the globe near the body.

=== Interior ===
==== The plan ====
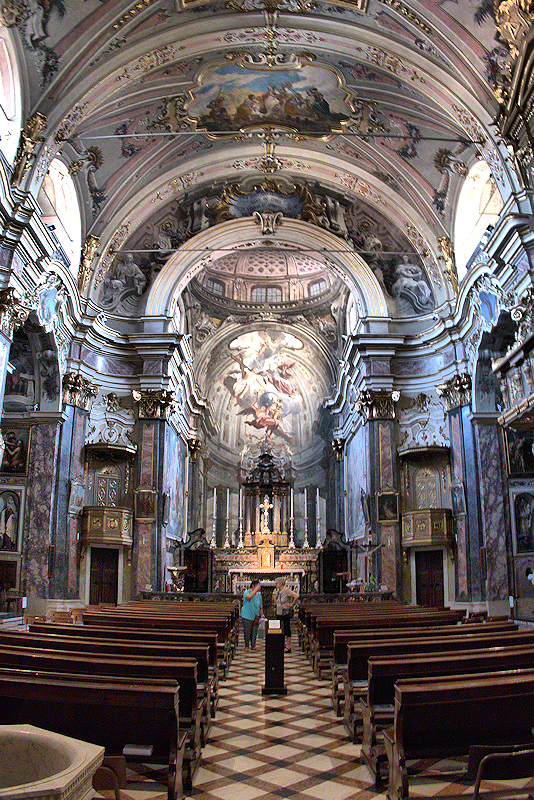
The interior

The church has a single nave and is rectangular in shape, measuring approximately 27 by 17 meters. It is divided into three bays with three arched chapels (the central one on the right contains the windbreak room of the side entrance and the organ), above which are the matroneums with a lowered arch and balustrade. The chapels are very elaborate, with complex moldings and frames with a central cartouche. In the center of the hall is the much narrower and lower presbytery with a flat apse.

==== Left wall ====
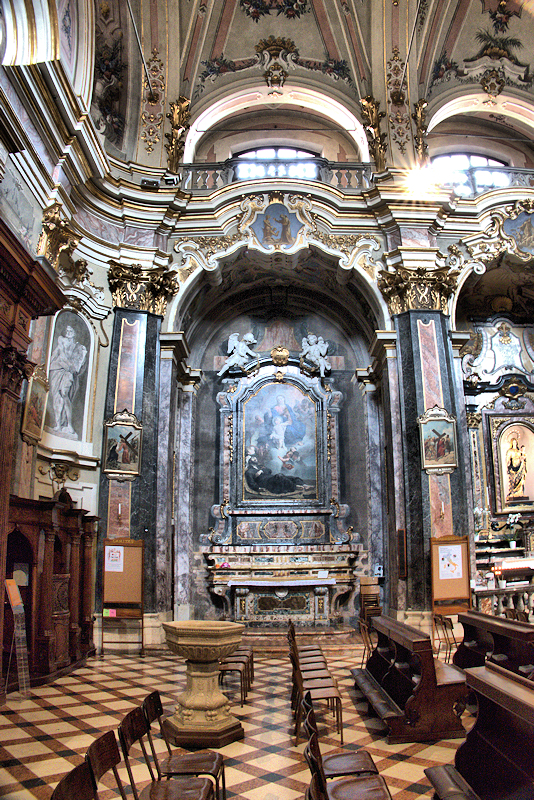
The chapel dedicated to St. Francis Xavier

The first chapel on the left is dedicated to St. Francis Xavier and the decoration is the work of the Galliari brothers. It has no balustrade and in the keystone the medallion has a monochromatic scene depicting St. Francis Xavier baptizing the infidels; on the side walls are two paintings attributed to Giovanni Brunelli and depict St. Francis Xavier freeing an obsessed woman and St. Francis Xavier resurrecting a deceased woman. The altar dates back to 1778, is by an unknown artist and has a table with a high base and inverted volutes, lateral pilasters supporting a mixtilinear arch; above, two stucco angels hold a festoon with a central scroll; in the middle there is a canvas by Giuseppe Peroni depicting The Virgin and St. Francis Xavier. On the vault there are paintings of little angels holding roses and lilies in their hands.

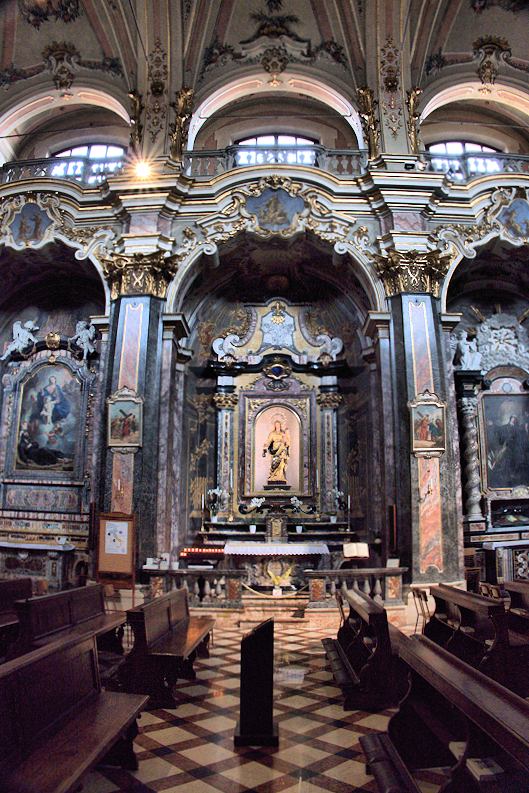
The chapel dedicated to Our Lady of Mount Carmel

In the second chapel on the left, originally dedicated to St. Francis of Paola, the Virgin of Carmel is venerated. It has a balustrade, the work of Domenico Catella from 1825; the cartouche of the keystone depicts the Glory of St. Francis of Paola. Initially decorated by the Gru brothers, 1762 it was completely revised by the brothers Giuseppe and Giovanni Torricelli at the behest of the Consortium of the Blessed Sacrament with illusionistic effects and a fake window.

On the side walls are two paintings on the theme of the Annunciation by Tomaso Pombioli. The altar is the work of Ambrogio Pedetti and dates back to 1744, made in a wavy shape with polychrome marble and a central medallion with a cross; it supports a tabernacle on whose opening the Resurrection of Jesus is reproduced. The upper part is composed of two pilasters with composite capitals supporting a black marble entablature; the whole is finished off by a tall pediment with a central shell. In the center is a statue of the Virgin of Carmel, by Gordiano Sanzio in 1836.

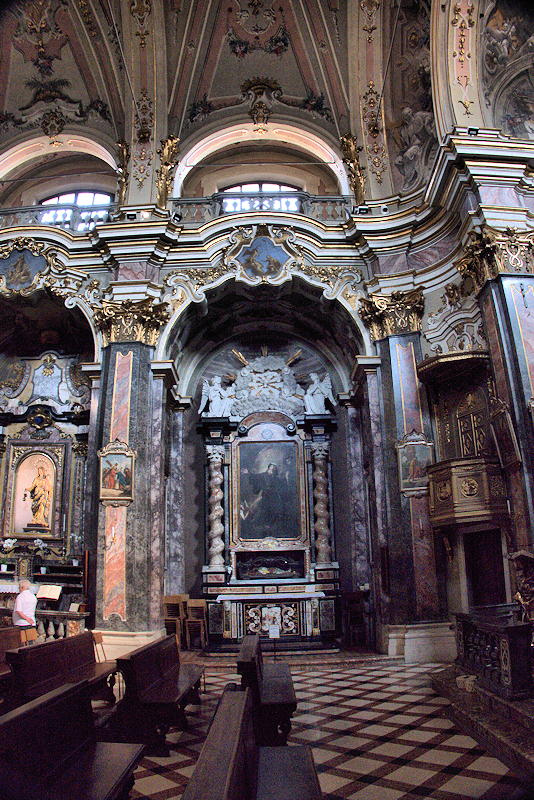
The chapel dedicated to St. Francis of Paola

The third chapel on the left is the result of a series of changes and rearrangements that began in the first half of the 19th century and is now dedicated to St. Francis of Paola; similar in architectural layout to the previous ones, it features illusionistic decoration by Fabrizio Galliari; the entrance medallion depicts the Annunciation. On the side walls are the paintings "The Communion of St. Jerome" and "The Communion of Mary Magdalene", works by anonymous artists of the 17th century. The altar in polychrome marble is attributed, with some doubt, to Domenico Catella and dates back to 1825 and depicts the Annunciation in bas-relief; above, a step supports the urn containing the mortal remains of St. Theodore, while on either side two spiral columns rise up with black capitals and pulvini supporting an arch; finally, between two stucco angels, a motif with the dove of the Holy Spirit and golden rays unfolds.

In the center, the altarpiece is a canvas by Federico Bencovich known as Fedrighetto and depicts Saint Francis of Paola.

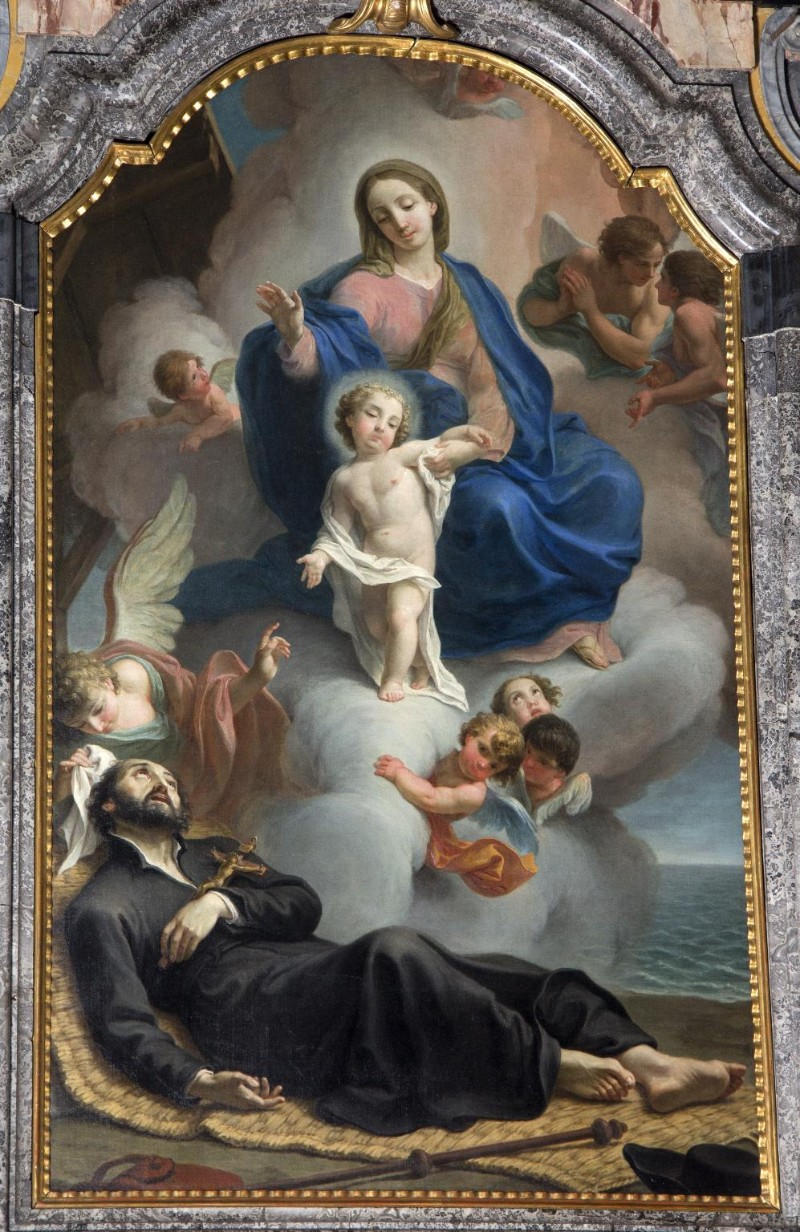
Giuseppe Peroni, The Virgin and St. Francis Xavier, oil on canvas, 1760

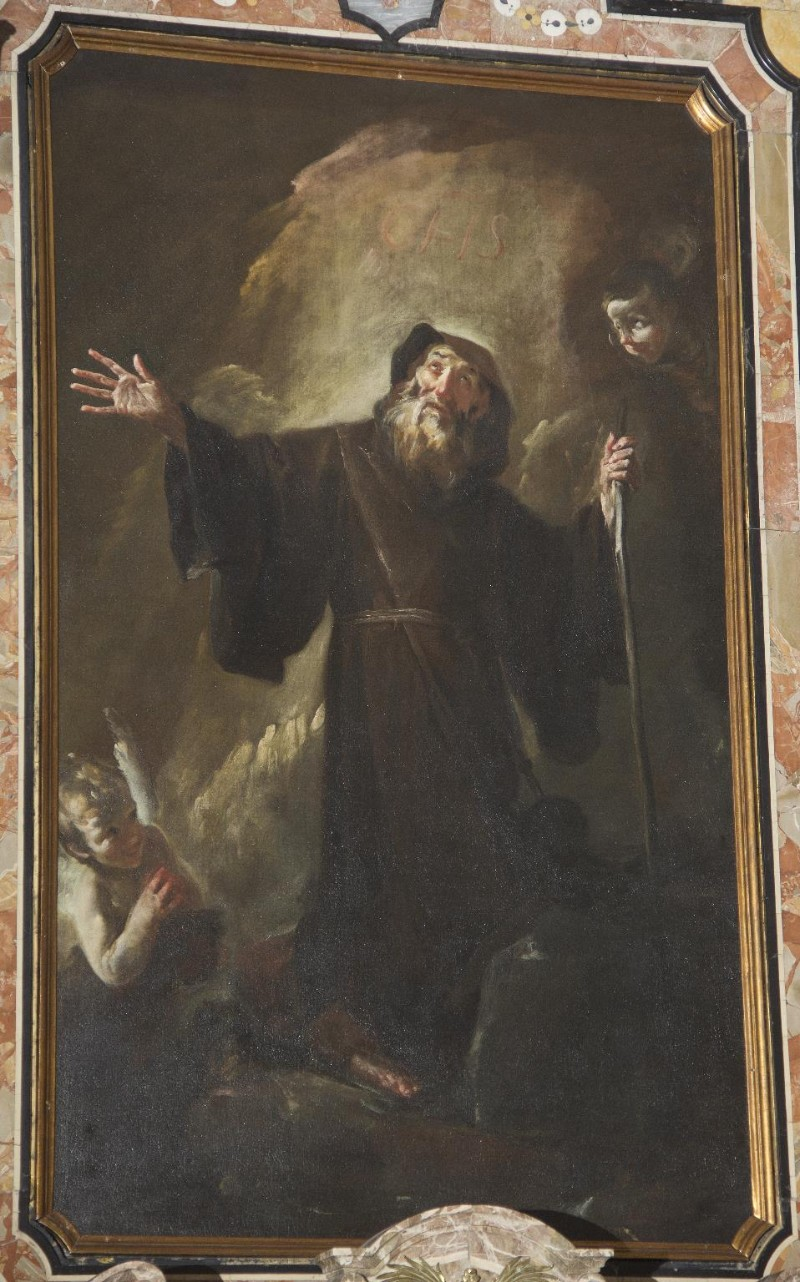
Federico Bencovich, known as Fedrighetto, The Ecstasy of St. Francis of Paola, oil on canvas, ca. 1720-1724

==== Presbytery area ====
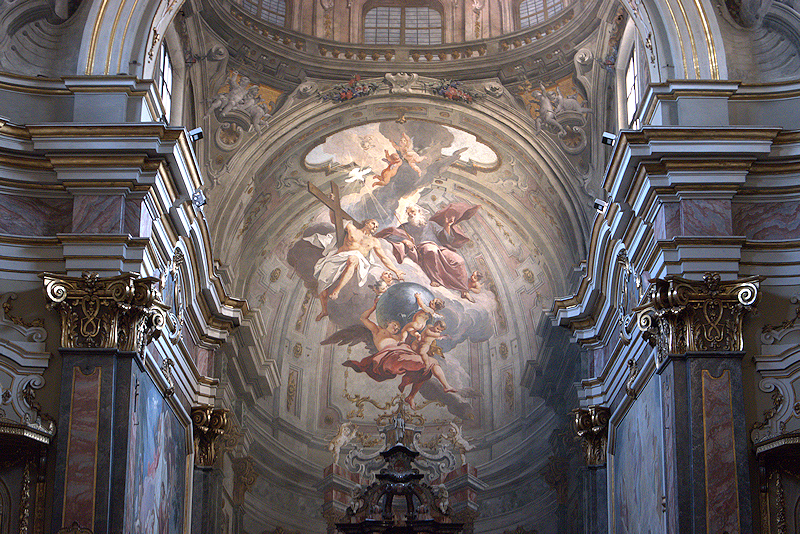
The apse, plain but frescoed with strongly illusionistic effects

The presbytery, closed off from the hall by two balustrades with columns, is flanked by two imposts with pilasters and gilded capitals. On the right and left sides of the opening are two wooden inlaid pulpits from 1829/1830 by Giovanni Battista Annessa, gilded by Giovanni Mora in 1831.

The decoration of the presbytery was also entrusted in 1766 to the Galliari brothers, assisted by Giovanni Savanni, to whom they entrusted the realization of the two side paintings, subsequently framed by Angelo Bacchetta with a stucco relief in 1866; they depict: The Baptism of Jesus and The Transfiguration. Due to lack of space, the church has a flat wall, but the Galliari created an illusion of space with a dome and balustrade, columns and buttresses, architectural features that give the impression of hypothetical buildings, all drawn in perspective from the point of view of someone standing in the center of the room; within this complex scenography, Galliari painted "The Glory of the Trinity" on the upper part of the altarpiece.

The altar, adapted from the previous church, was embellished by the Fantoni around the years 1725/1726, and consecrated in 1815, as recalled by an epigraph placed behind the reredos:

On March 8, 1815,

Augusto Cattaneo, Bishop
of Guastalla, consecrated
the main altar of this

church of his native land
VIII IDUS MAY MCMXV

AUG CATTANEO EPISC
GUASTALL ARAM MAXIMAM
HUIUS SIBI PATRIAE

ECCLESIAE CONSACRAVIT

The altar is considered valuable, made up of inlays with volutes, flowers, birds holding branches, leaves and berries.

Behind the temple there is a wooden choir in fine walnut, consisting of thirteen stalls, two doors and a central seat, perhaps adapted from the previous church.

==== Right wall ====
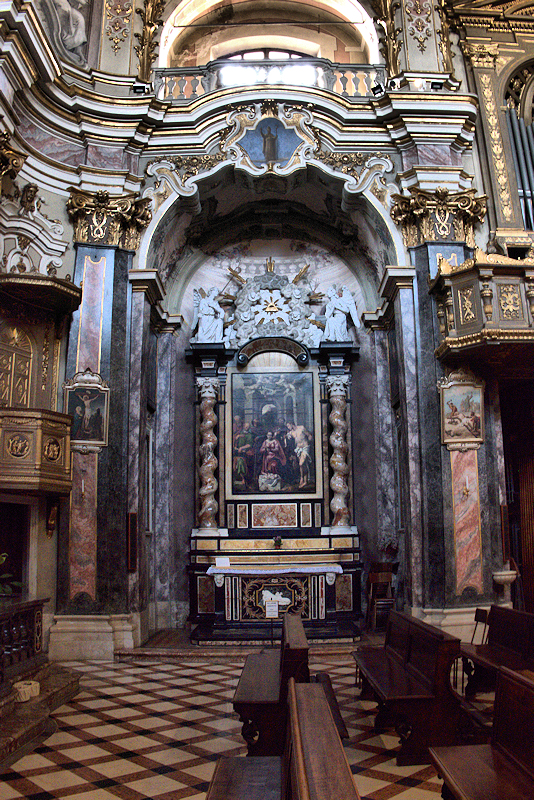
The chapel dedicated to the Nativity

The chapel dedicated to the Nativity is located in the third bay on the right and has a figure of Saint Giles, who had a previous dedication, in the keystone. Decorated, again with illusionistic effects, by the Galliari brothers, it has two paintings on the side walls: The Incredulity of St. Thomas from the 19th century and St. Charles Borromeo from the 17th century, both by unknown artists; a niche created in 1926 contains a statue dedicated to St. Cajetan.

The altar, by an unknown artist, may have undergone several interventions over time; it is made of polychrome marble with a panel in the center depicting Jesus being taken down from the cross. A base supports two spiral columns, capitals and two tall pulvini with kneeling plaster cherubs; above the arch there is a motif with clouds, angel heads and the radiating triangle with an eye, symbol of God. The altarpiece has a painting of the Nativity or Sacred Conversation, by Callisto Piazza, commissioned by the Consortium in 1537.

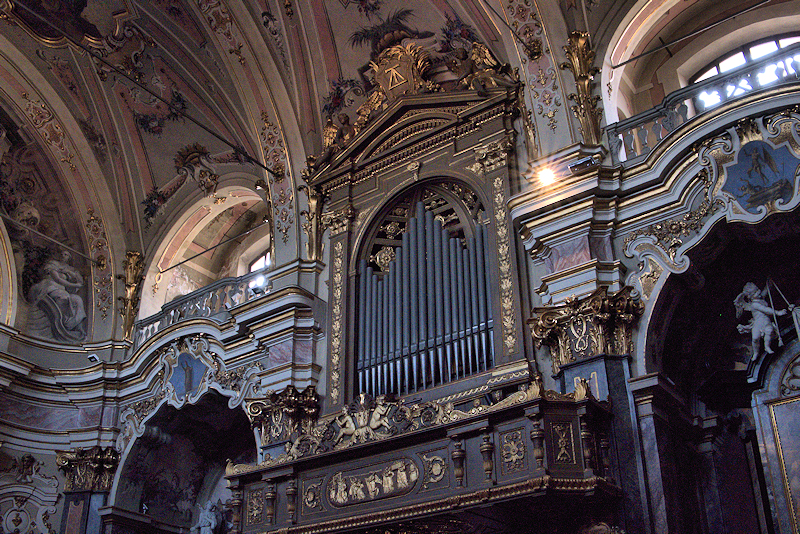
The organ and its choir loft

The second bay on the right contains the entrance portal and, above it, the organ, placed in a case decorated with festoons and capitals and made in 1785 by Giacomo Caniani and gilded in 1829 by Giovanni Mora. The current instrument is a "Benzi e Franceschini" from 1909, restored by the company Inzoli Cav. Pacifico in 2006. It has 27 pedals, two 57-key keyboards, 1,577 pipes. It has the following sound configuration:

Pedal
| Double Basses | 16' |
| Bourdon | 16' |
| Bass | 8' |
| Cello | 8' |

Great Organ
| Principal | 16' |
| Principal | 8' |
| Dulciana | 8' |
| Flute | 8' |
| Viola | 8' |
| Octave | 4' |
| Twelfth | 3 1/2' |
| Fifteenth | 2' |
| Mixture | 7 rows |

Swell Organ
| Little Principal | 8' |
| Bourdon | 8' |
| Concert Violas | 8' |
| Celeste | 4' |
| Flute | 4' |
| Little Octave | 4' |
| Mixture | 3 rows |

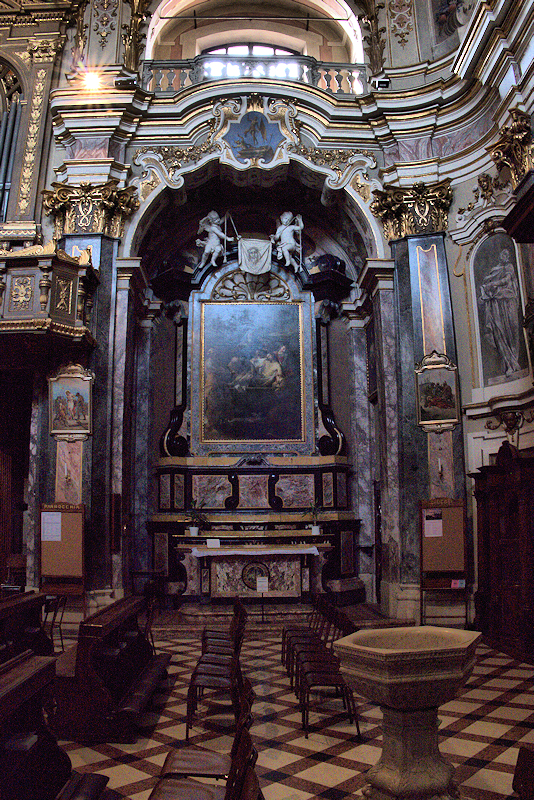
The chapel dedicated to the Holy Sepulcher

The chapel dedicated to the Holy Sepulcher is located in the first bay on the right. The title was transferred in the 16th century from the original parish church located outside the city walls. Similar in structure to the other chapels, and also decorated by the Galliari brothers, the entrance medallion depicts the "Resurrection of Christ". One of the features of this chapel is the space on the right wall that once contained the baptismal font, above which hangs a canvas of the Crucifixion, by an unknown artist and dated 1733. On the opposite wall a niche contains a statue dedicated to Saint Joseph.

The altar, originally by Ambrogio Pedetti, was rearranged by Domenico Catella in 1820 and, perhaps, by Angelo Bacchetta in 1885. It is made of gray, black and white marble, with a roundel with a cross in the center. Above a high red marble base, it supports two volutes that continue into two marble lesenes that support a mixtilinear trabeation with a central conch; finally, two little angels in Carrara marble hold the veil of Veronica. The altarpiece reproduces the Deposition of Jesus in the Sepulcher, a canvas by the Tuscan artist Pompeo Batoni from the 18th century.

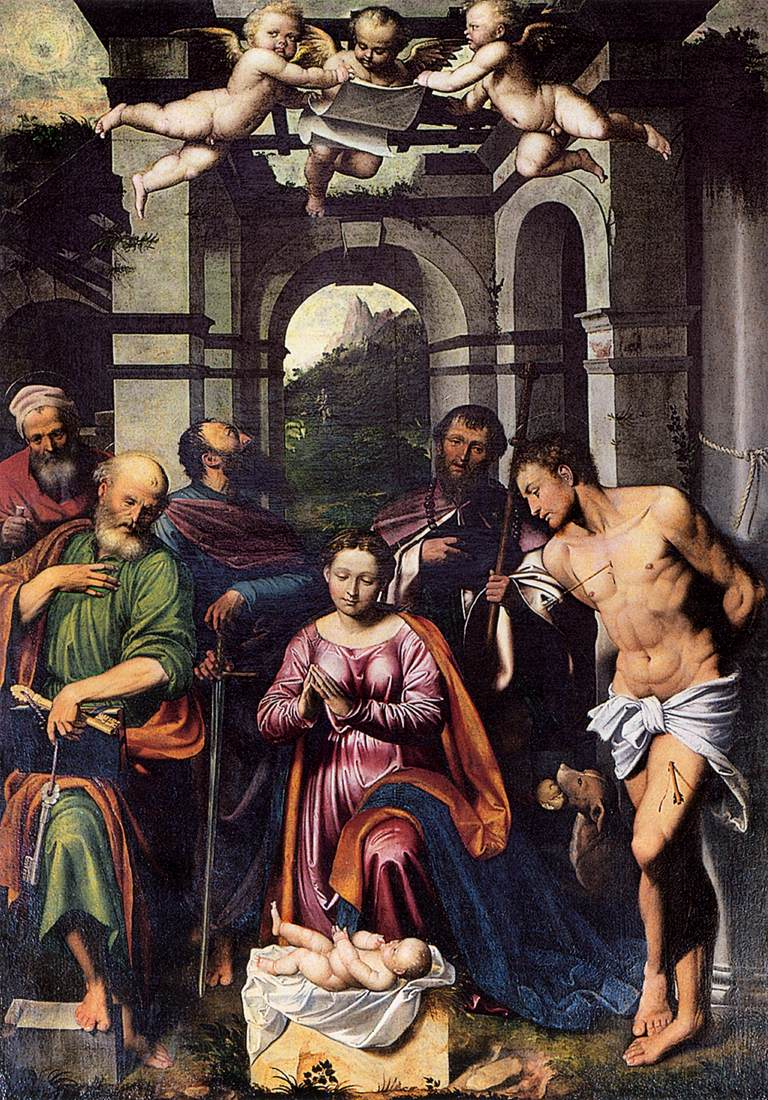
Callisto Piazza, Nativity of Jesus, oil on canvas, 1538

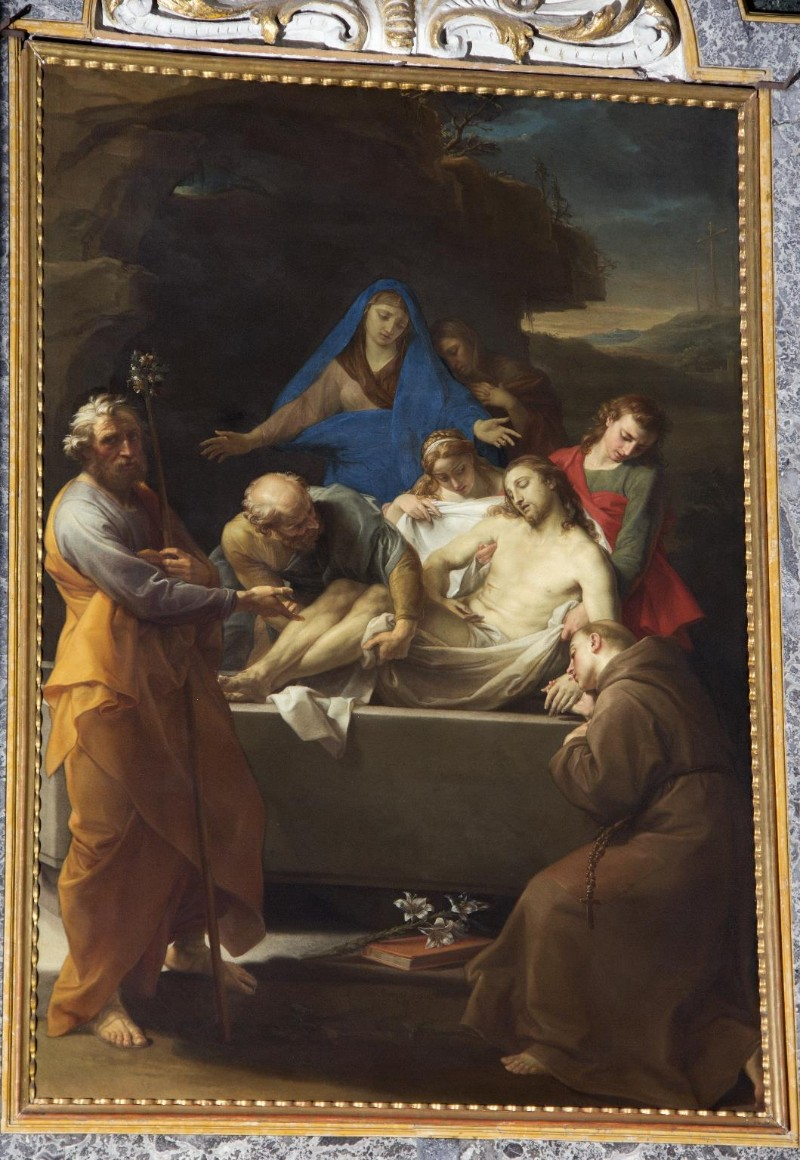
Pompeo Batoni, Jesus Christ laid in the sepulcher, oil on canvas, 1761

==== Vault and counter-façade ====
The vault is decorated by Giuseppe Gru: in the three bays, in addition to the pictorial decoration, there are three large panels with mixtilinear outlines depicting episodes from the Old Testament: Rebecca at the Well, Jacob's Ladder and Moses saved from the waters.

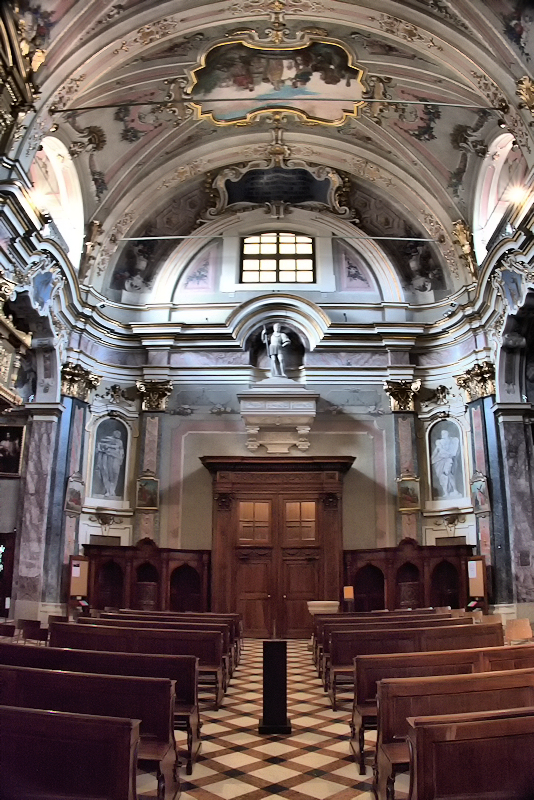
The counter-façade

The counter-façade has the entrance portal (Antonio Antolini, 1803) flanked by carved wooden confessionals, 19th-century works by Michele Franceschini. On either side of the confessionals are painted two fake openings with niches depicting two prophets in monochromatic style.

In front of the entrance, the light-colored marble holy water stoup comes from the previous church where it may have been used as a baptismal font.

Above the entrance is the 16th-century sarcophagus containing the mortal remains of Bartolino da Terni, already present in the previous church; there is a statue depicting the condottiere in a meditative pose, the work of the Venetian sculptor Lorenzo Bregno as indicated by the signature at the base of the work:

LAURENTIUS BRENIUS FA[CEVAT]
Lorenzo Bregno made

The urn, supported by brackets, bears the following inscription:

QUI VENETAS INTER COPIAS

ANN XL FLORIUT BARTO TERNUS
GENERE AEQUESTRIQ DIGNITATE
CLARUS HIC FIDE ET PATRIA
PLORANTIB TEGITUR DIE P

IULII MDIIXX
Bartolino da Terni, who for 40 years

was a leader in the Venetian troops,
illustrious for his equestrian nobility and
lineage, is honored here by those
who mourn him for his faith,

his valor and his love for his country.

==== Other works ====
In the sacristy there is an altarpiece dedicated to the Adoration of the Magi, a work attributed to Giovanni Brunelli and a reminder of an ancient altar dedicated to the Three Kings. Another painting kept there is of Saint Francis de Sales and Saint Jane Frances de Chantal, a nineteenth-century work by an unknown artist.

The church also houses two sketches by Gian Giacomo Barbelli: Saint Anthony of Padua and Saint Firmus and the Flight into Egypt; a canvas depicting the Massacre of the Innocents is also attributed to Barbelli, although there is some doubt about this.

Other paintings: The Virgin and Saint Felix of Cantalice by anonymous 19th-century artists and two 17th-century works depicting The miracles of Saint Francis of Paola.

Finally, the parish priest Antonio Gozzoni introduced the cult of Saint Cajetan in 1764 and commissioned a painting from Gian Domenico Cignaroli, the brother of Giambettino by his second marriage, depicting The Redeemer with Saint Giles, Saint Cajetan and Saint Francis de Sales. The canvas is signed on the back:

— ICONEM HANC ELEMOSYNIS PICTAM ANN. 1764 AUTORE D. CIGNAROLO VERONEN. PRAEPOSITO A.M. GOZZONO

The canvas is now stored at the Civic Museum of Crema.

== Image gallery ==
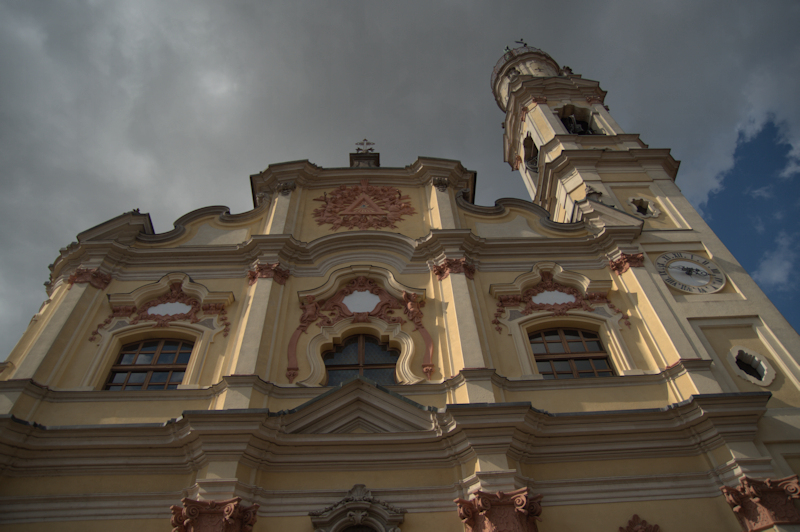
The upper order of the side facade

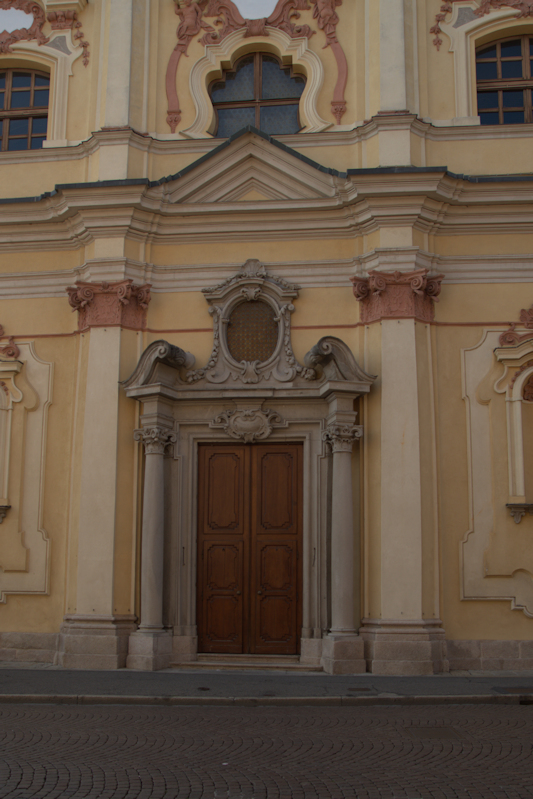
The side portal

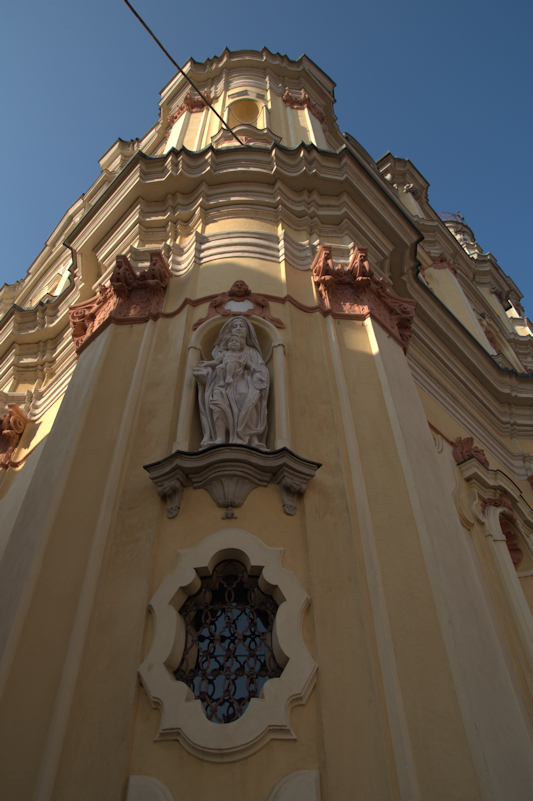
The junction between the two facades

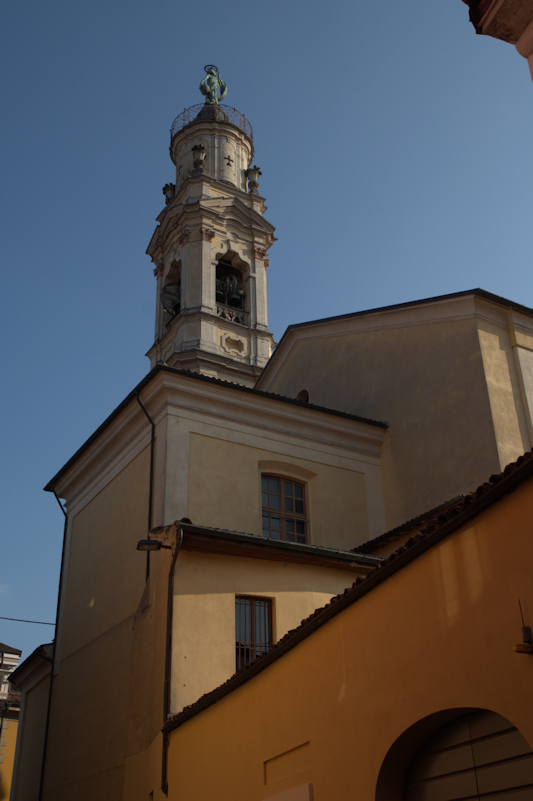
Rear view, with the presbytery in the center

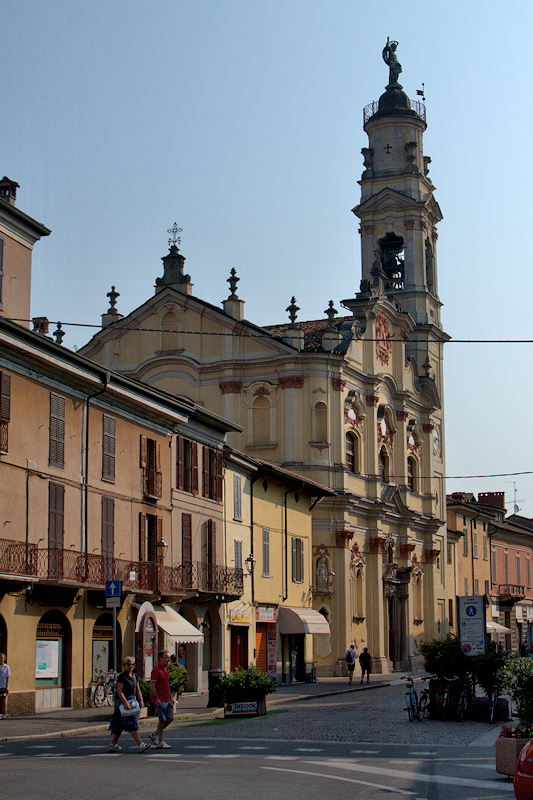
General view along via XX Settembre

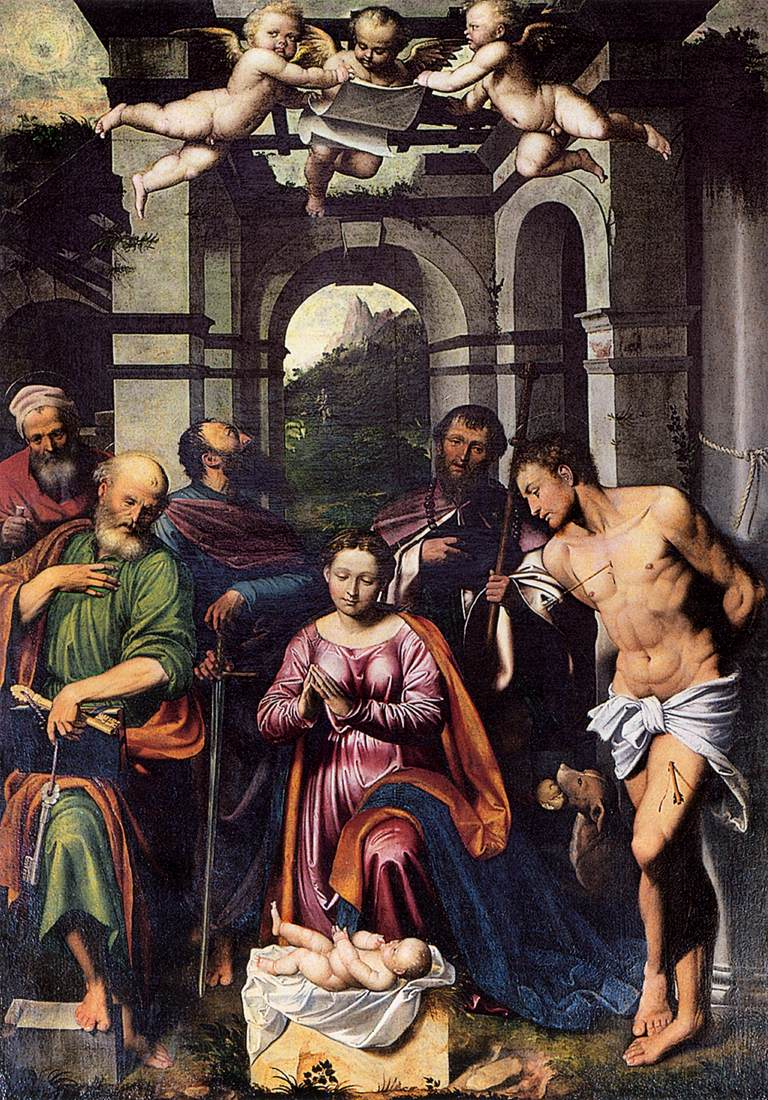
The Nativity by Callisto Piazza

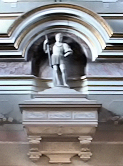
Funeral monument of Bartolino da Terni

== See also ==
- Roman Catholic Diocese of Crema

== Bibliography ==
- Fino, Alemanio (1715). Istoria di Crema raccolta dalli annali di M. Pietro Terni per M. Alemanio Fino [History of Crema Collected from the Annals of M. Pietro Terni by M. Alemanio Fino] (in Italian). Crema.
- Various authors (1834). Almanacco cremasco per l'anno 1834 [Cremasque Almanac for the Year 1834] (in Italian). Crema: Tip. Ronna.
- Sforza Benvenuti, Francesco (1859). Storia di Crema [History of Crema] (in Italian). Milan.
- Perolini, Mario (1976). Origini dei nomi delle strade di Crema [Origins of the Names of the Streets of Crema] (in Italian). Cremona: Tip. Padana.
- Zavaglio, Angelo (1991). I monasteri cremaschi di regola benedettina [The Benedictine Monasteries of Crema] (in Italian). Crema: Libreria editrice Buona Stampa.
- Ceserani Ermentini, Lidia (2003). Il coro della parrocchia della Ss. Trinità in Crema, in Insula Fulcheria XXXIII [The Choir of the Parish of the Holy Trinity in Crema, in Insula Fulcheria XXXIII] (in Italian).
- Zucchelli, Giorgio (2005). SS. Trinity [Holy Trinity] (in Italian). Il Nuovo Torrazzo.
- Gruppo antropologico cremasco (2009). I campanili della diocesi di Crema [The Bell Towers of the Diocese of Crema] (in Italian). Crema: Leva Artigrafiche.
- Dossena, Alberto (2011). Gli organi della diocesi di Crema tra passato e presente, in Insula Fulcheria XLI, Volume A [The Organs of the Diocese of Crema Between Past and Present, in Insula Fulcheria XLI, Volume A] (in Italian).
- Campanella, Christian (2018). La chiesa della SS. Trinità di Crema. RESTAURI prassi e metodo [The Church of the Holy Trinity in Crema. RESTORATION: practice and method] (in Italian). Rome: Gruppo editoriale l'Espresso.
- Various authors (2019). Diocesi di Crema [Diocese of Crema] (in Italian). Crema: Cancelleria Vescovile.
