= Paolo Panelli (painter) =

Italian painter

Paolo Panelli (January 2, 1656 – Jauanary 6, 1759) was an Italian painter of the Late-Baroque, active in mainly in Verona.

He trained first with his father, but later in life studied with Santo Prunato; he also later learned engraving from Robert van Oudenard. He painted a St Joseph in Prison for the Oratory of San Biagio of Verona and for the church of the Monache di San Domenico. Giovanni Battista Buratto was his pupil.
