= Giovanni Domenico Cignaroli =

Italian painter

Giovanni Domenico Cignaroli (1722–1793) was an Italian painter of the Rococo and early Neoclassic period between 1744 up until his death in 1793. He was the brother of the prominent Veronese painter Gianbettino Cignaroli.

== Biography ==
He was born and died in Verona, Republic of Venice, where he painted sacred works, including for the church of Sant'Eufemia.
