= Giambettino Cignaroli =

Italian painter

- Self portrait, 1755, Kunsthistorisches Museum, Vienna
- Born: 4 July 1706; Verona, Republic of Venice
- Died: 1 December 1770 (aged 64); Verona, Republic of Venice
- Education: Santi Prunati; Antonio Balestra
- Known for: Painting
- Movement: Rococo; Neoclassicism

Giambettino Cignaroli (Verona, 4 July 1706 – Verona, 1 December 1770) was an Italian painter of the Rococo and early Neoclassic period. A major representative of the classicizing Rococo, Cignaroli is considered the North Italian counterpart to Pompeo Batoni in Rome.

== Biography ==
=== Early life and career ===
Giambettino Cignaroli was born in Verona on 4 July 1706. He came from a family of artists: his uncle was the painter Leonardo Seniore, and his cousins were the painters Martino and Pietro Cignaroli. His younger brother, Giovanni Domenico, also became a painter. After completing his studies at the Jesuit college, he became a pupil of Santi Prunati, a disciple of Carlo Cignani. His first known independent work, a Nativity, is dated 1726. After Prunati’s death Cignaroli organized his own studio in a room in his father’s house and began accepting commissions. Though now established as an independent artist, he nevertheless became a pupil of Antonio Balestra, who undoubtedly reinforced the already strongly classicizing tendencies of his style. In 1735 Cignaroli journeyed to Venice, where he painted a series of frescoes of mythological scenes in Palazzo Labia. For Chioggia Cathedral he executed, in oils, his best-known early work, the Martyrdom of Saints Felix and Fortunatus (1737). Due to a severe bout of malaria in 1739 he returned to Verona, where he worked throughout the 1740s, though he was also active in nearby cities, among them Bergamo and Brescia. For the commissions that he obtained at this time, and throughout his prolific career, he made preparatory sketches. These reflect his keen interest in anatomy and were annotated on the reverse with completion dates and details of the destinations of the related paintings. Eventually he organized them into three volumes (Milan, Biblioteca Ambrosiana).

Cignaroli returned to Venice in 1744, and in the following year was in Vicenza, where he executed frescoes for the cathedral. He ceased fresco painting after this, due to his illness, and painted mainly in oil on canvas. His early production, until c. 1746, is characterized by pale, cool tones, a classical sense of composition and figures with sweet faces and affected mannerisms. Among his securely dated works of this period are the Saints Fermo and Rustico in Prison (1744; Bergamo Cathedral) and the Virgin and Child with Saints Mark and Alexander (1746; Bergamo, San Marco), in which can be seen the luminous greens, blues and pinks characteristic of his delicate colour range.

=== Middle period ===
Cignaroli’s middle period, which extended to c. 1760, is generally thought to have been his most creative. Examples of dated paintings include the Transfiguration (1753; Verona Cathedral), the Virgin with Saints (1758; Albino, near Bergamo, San Giuliano) and the Death of St. Joseph (1759; Alzano, near Bergamo, San Martino). These works are characterized by more structured, even architectural composition, and a darkening of the colours towards the pictures’ edges, which creates a spotlight effect that lends greater prominence to the figures. In 1759 Cignaroli travelled to Parma, where he was commissioned by Louise-Élisabeth of France, Duchess of Parma and daughter-in-law of Philip V of Spain, to paint the very large Virgin and Child with Saints (Madrid, Museo del Prado). This was sent to Spain to be hung in the royal church of San Idelfonso. For the Austrian governor of Milan and a collector of antiquities, Count Karl von Firmian, Cignaroli painted two canvases on Greco-Roman episodes, a thematic preferred by Neoclassic painters: Death of Cato (1759) and Death of Socrates (c. 1762).

In December 1764, Cignaroli became director of the Academy of Painting and Sculpture in Verona, which still bears his name. He was the academy's first director and remained in charge until his death in 1770. Among his many pupils were Maria Suppioti Ceroni, Giovanni Battista Lorenzi, Saverio Dalla Rosa and Christopher Unterberger. Cignaroli was, besides, an honorary member of the Accademia Clementina in Bologna and of the Academy of Fine Arts of Parma. By the 1760s he had achieved great fame and wealth; he never lacked buyers for his work, which so perfectly reflected the taste of his times. His renown spread beyond Italy, even to northern Europe and to the Russian court, but he declined all invitations to become a court painter. In 1766 he travelled to Turin, where he completed a St. John the Baptist for Charles Emmanuel III of Savoy. In the summer of 1769 Joseph II, Holy Roman Emperor, visited Cignaroli in his studio. The monarch departed stating that he had seen two rare things in Verona, ‘the [Roman] amphitheatre and Europe’s best painter’.

=== Later works ===
In the late works Cignaroli’s classicizing tendencies have become more pronounced and the sweetness of his earlier styles has gone, while emotions are sometimes overstated. The figures in his middle period exhibited some restrained movement, but in the later they are increasingly inactive. Most notable of his late works is the Death of Rachel (1770; Venice, Gallerie dell'Accademia), completed two months before his death. Cignaroli chose quiet images and rejected the animation of the Rococo. Though some authors have stated that he anticipated Neoclassicism, it would be more accurate to say that he looked back to early 16th century Venetian masters, chiefly Paolo Veronese. It was primarily only the firmness of composition, however, taken from this source, which was combined with more overtly Bolognese figure types and a structural, not decorative, conception of light. Cignaroli's late works mark a fairly full return to a rational, carefully paced, self-consciously responsible art, a tabula rasa achieved with immense taste and elegance upon which the later inventions of a new and aggressive classicism could be imposed. Cignaroli died in Verona on 1 December 1770, aged 64.

Besides being a painter, Cignaroli was a poet, historian and art theorist. His history of Veronese painting, Serie dei pittori veronesi, was published in Verona (1749) as a supplement to Cronaca di Verona descritta da Pier Zagata. He also wrote a biography of his master Antonio Balestra (La vita di Antonio Balestra, Verona, 1762).

== Works ==
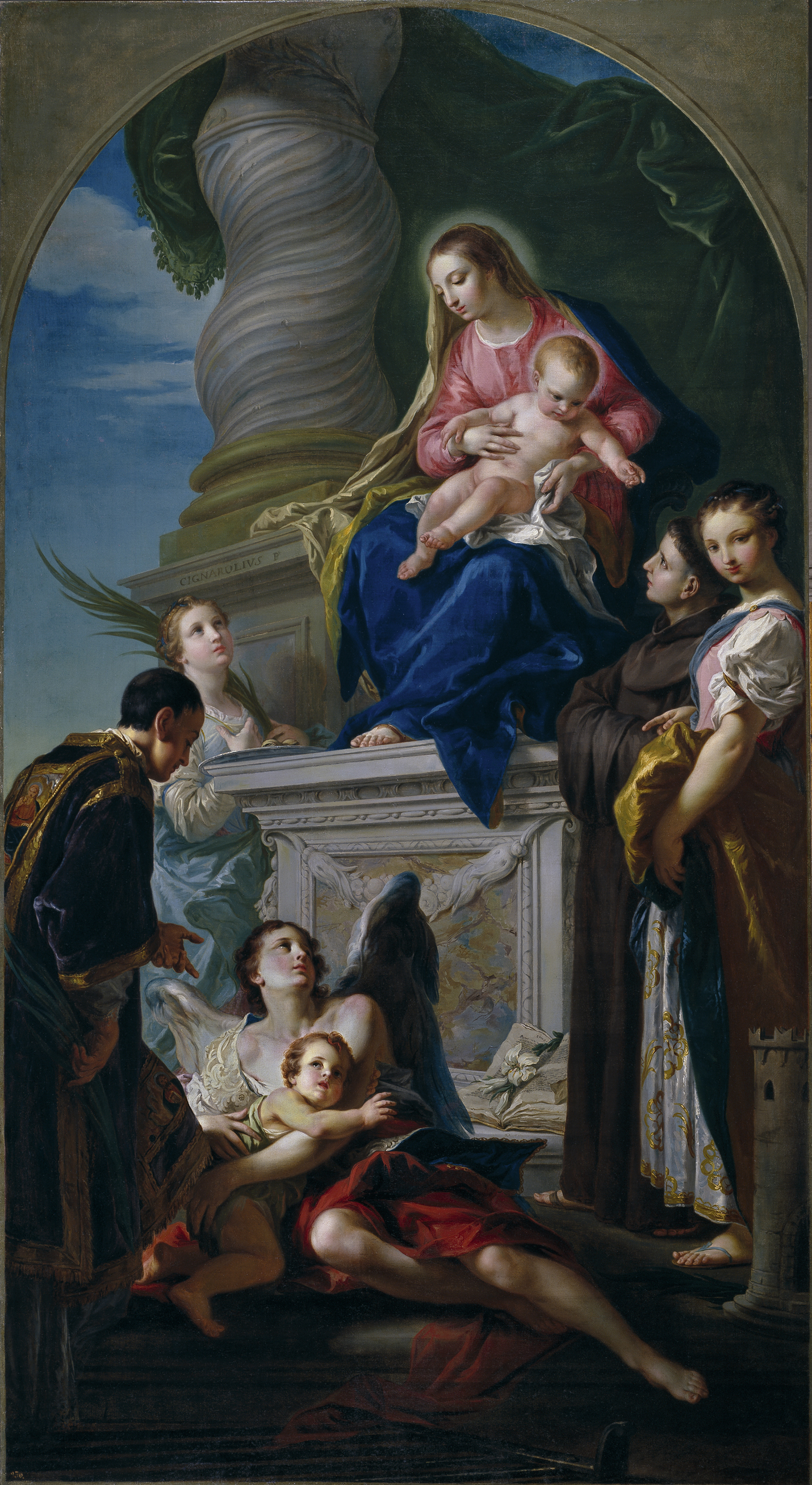
The Virgin and Child with Saints, 1759-1762, Museo del Prado, Madrid

- Martyr of Saints Felix and Fortunatus, 1737, Bergamo Cathedral;
- Apollo and Marsyas, 1739, Villa Pompei, Illasi, Verona;
- Abraham chases Hagar with her son Ishmael, c. 1740, National Museum in Wrocław;
- The Sacrifice of Iphigenia, 1741, Villa Pompei, Illasi, Verona;
- Saint Helena, 1741, Castelvecchio Museum, Verona;
- Transfiguration of Christ, 1741, Verona Cathedral;
- Saint Procolus Visiting Saints Fermus and Rusticus, 1744, Bergamo Cathedral;
- Virgin and Child With Saints Jerome and Alexander, 1744, Chiesa dell'Ospedale, Bergamo;
- Aurora, 1748, Casa Fattori, Verona;
- Self portrait, 1755, Kunsthistorisches Museum, Vienna;
- The Death of Socrates, 1759, Museum of Fine Arts, Budapest;
- Alexander the Great before the Deceased Wife of Darius, c. 1760, National Gallery of Slovenia, Ljubljana;
- St Martha, c. 1760, Bowes Museum, Barnard Castle;
- The Virgin and Child with Saints, 1759-1762, Museo del Prado, Madrid;
- The Death of Cato, 1762, Museum of Fine Arts, Budapest
- Adoration of the Magi, c. 1770, Bavarian State Painting Collections, Munich;
- The Death of Rachel, 1769-1770, Gallerie dell'Accademia, Venice;
- Wolfgang Amadeus Mozart at the age of 14 in Verona, 1770, priv. col.
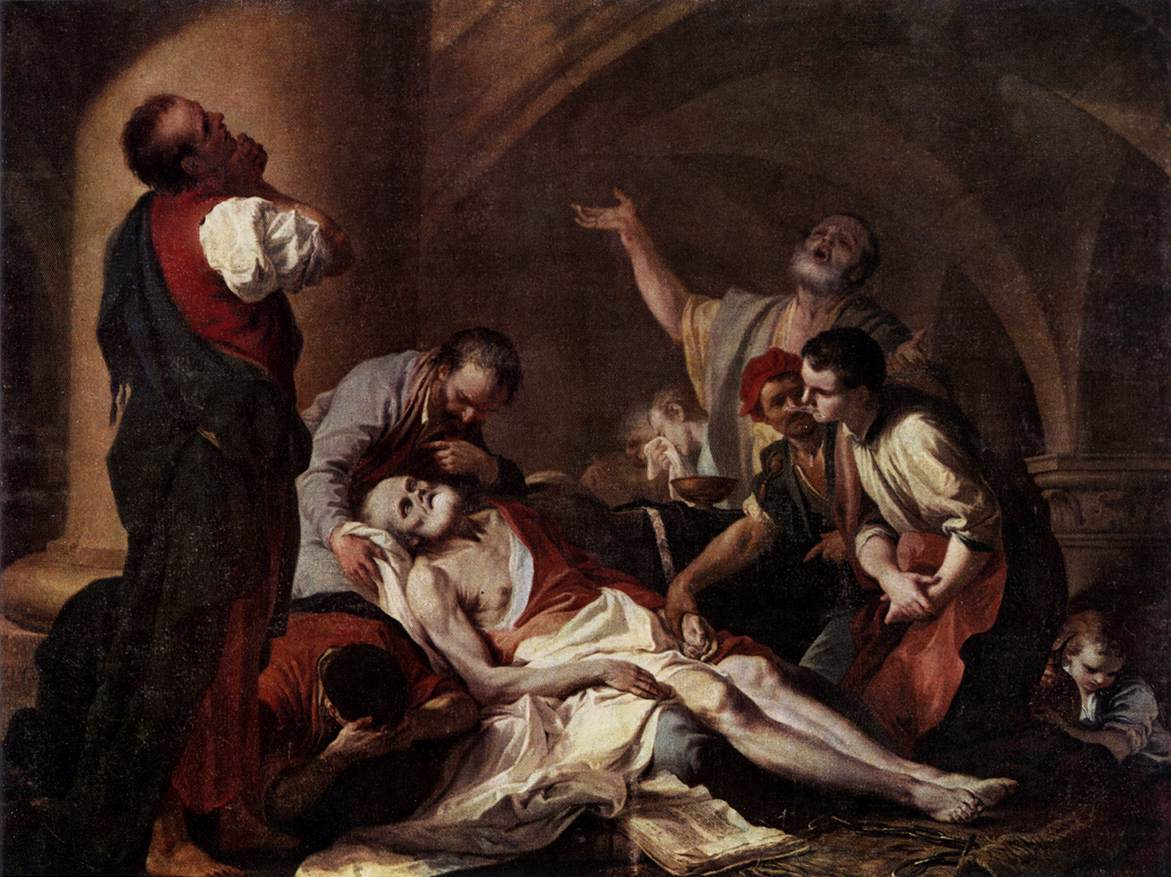
Death of Socrates, 1759, Museum of Fine Arts, Budapest

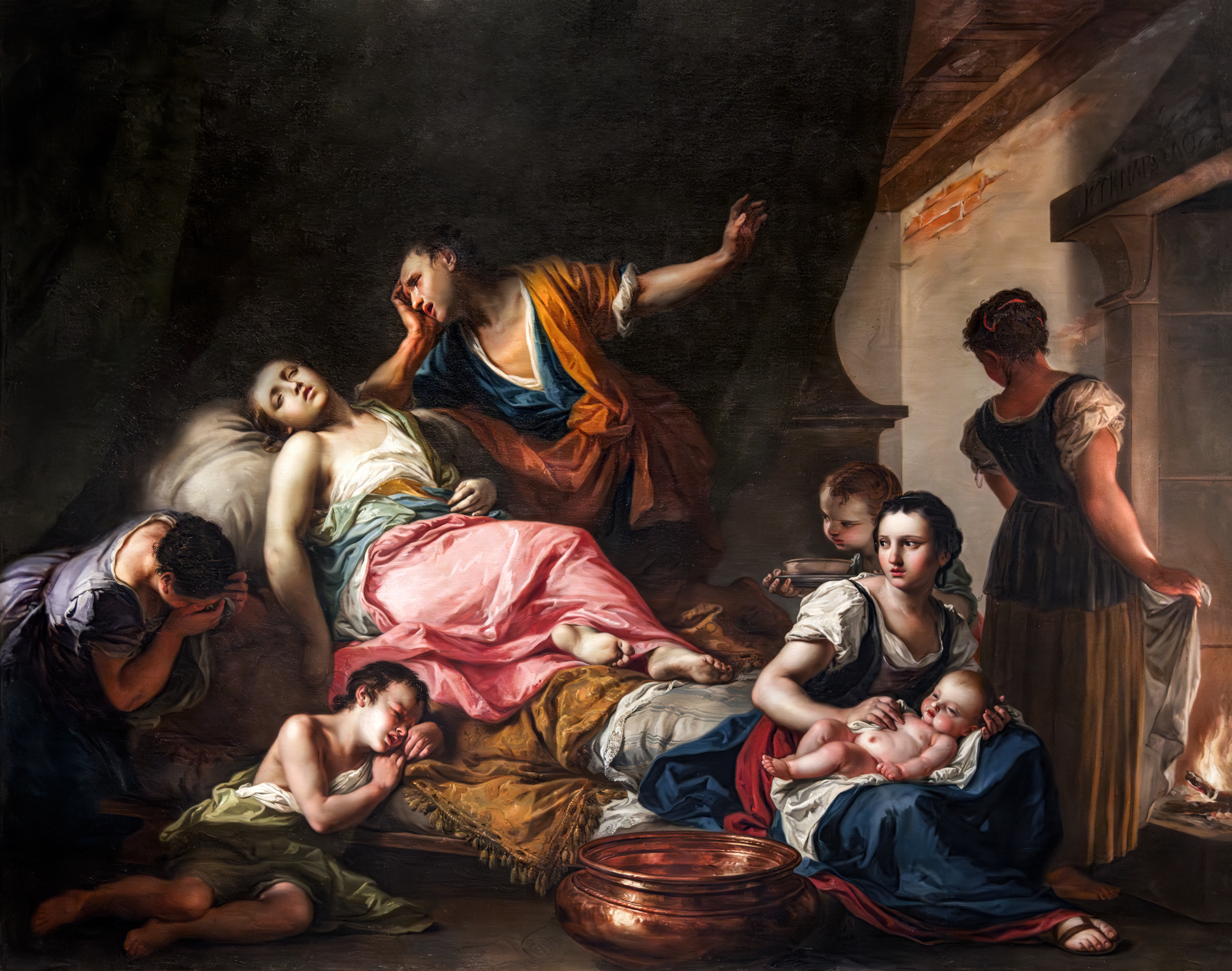
The Death of Rachel, Gallerie dell'Accademia, Venice

Portrait of Wolfgang Amadeus Mozart at the age of 13, 1770, priv. col.

Alexander the Great before the Deceased Wife of Darius, c. 1760, National Gallery of Slovenia, Ljubljana

Adoration of the Magi, c. 1770, Bavarian State Painting Collections, Munich

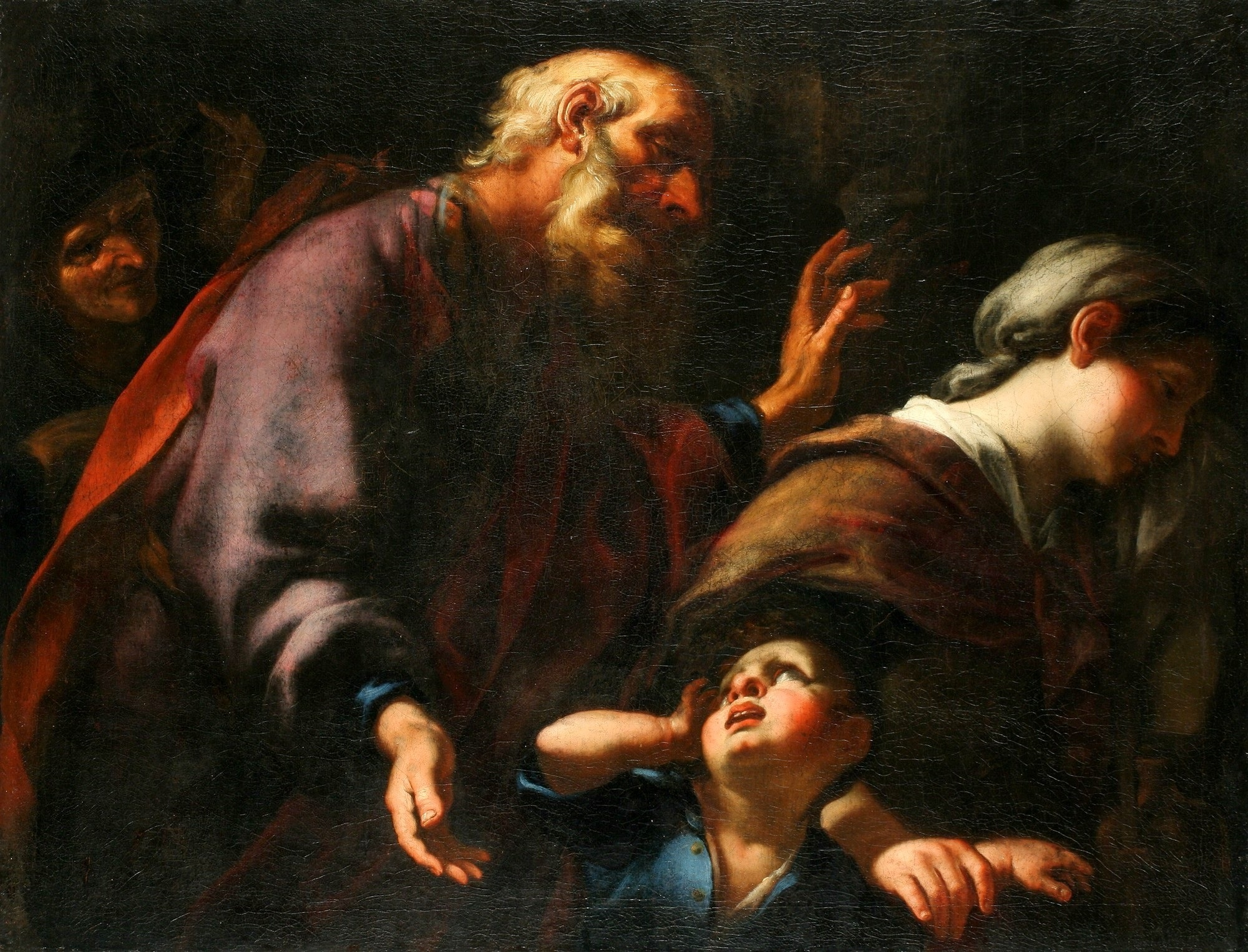
Abraham chases Hagar with her son Ishmael, c. 1740, National Museum in Wrocław

Young Woman with a Rosary, Galleria nazionale di Parma

Leda and the Swan, c. 1756, painted by Cignaroli for Augustus III of Poland, priv. col.

== Sources ==
- Pompei, Girolamo (1771). Orazione in morte di Giambettino Cignaroli ed alcune poetiche composizioni sopra lo stesso argomento. Verona: Moroni.
- Bevilacqua, Ippolito (1771). Memorie della vita di Giambettino Cignaroli eccellente dipintor veronese. Verona: Moroni.
- Warma, Susanne J. (1993). "Cignaroli's Unexpected Accomodation to Michelangelo and an Unusual St Teresa and St John". Mitteilungen des Kunsthistorischen Institutes in Florenz. 37 (1): 146–150. JSTOR 27653351.
- Geiger, Joseph (1996). "Giambettino Cignaroli's Deaths of Cato and of Socrates". Zeitschrift für Kunstgeschichte. 59: 270–278. doi:10.2307/1482801.
- Wittkower, Rudolph (1998). Art and Architecture in Italy 1600-1750. Vol. III: The Late Baroque. Yale University Press.
- Tomezzoli, Andrea (March 2015). "From Venice to Newport: a painting by Giambettino Cignaroli lost and found". The Burlington Magazine. 157 (1344): 181–185. JSTOR 24242297.
