= Kobyłka =

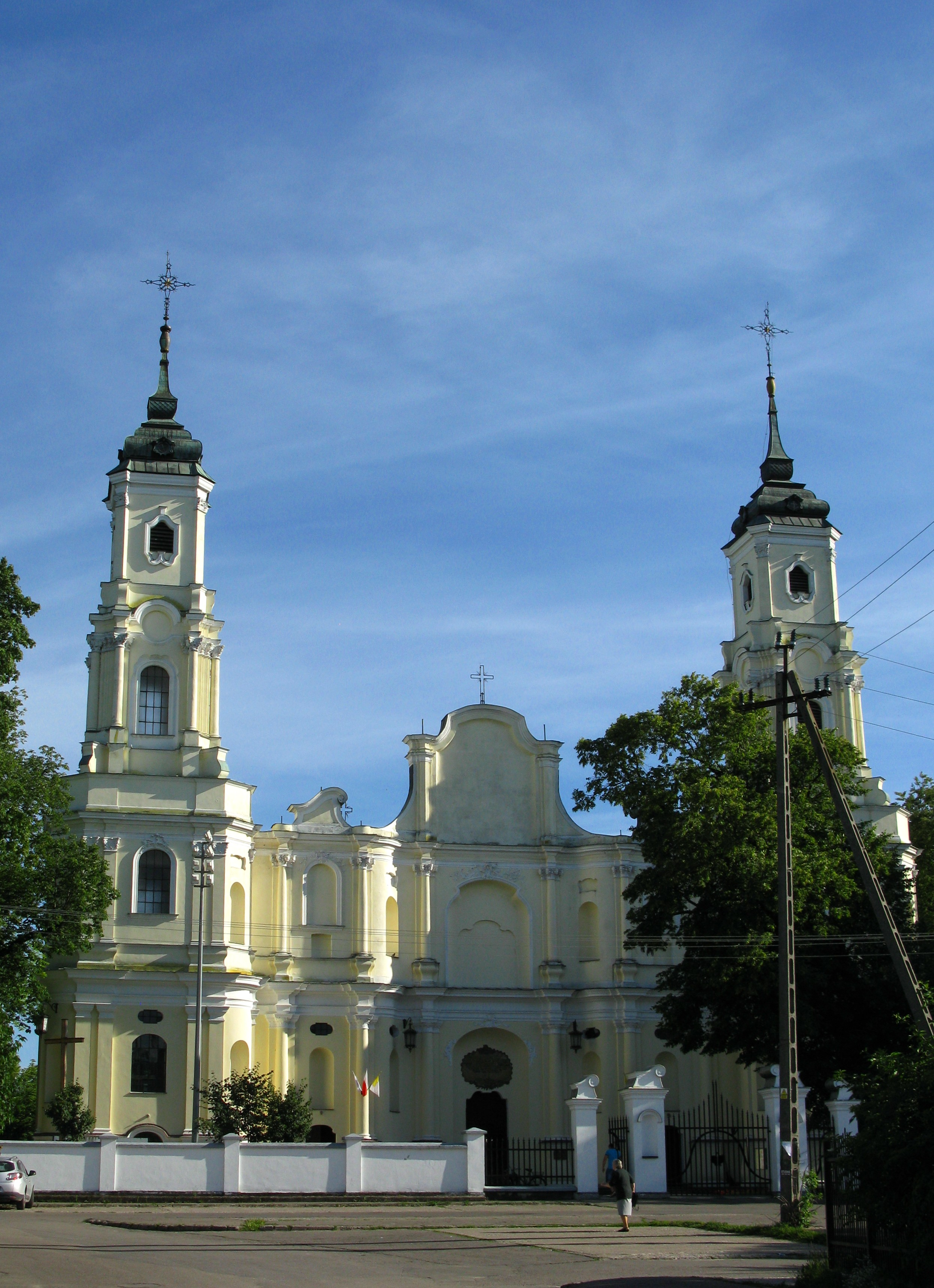
- Baroque Holy Trinity church in Kobyłka

- Coat of arms

- Location within Poland
- Coordinates: 52°20′N 21°12′E
- Country: Poland
- Voivodeship: Masovian
- County: Wołomin
- Gmina: Kobyłka (urban gmina)
- Town rights: 1969

Government
  - Mayor: Edyta Zbieć

Area
  - Total: 20.05 km^{2} (7.74 sq mi)

Population (2013)
  - Total: 22,000
  - Density: 1,100/km^{2} (2,800/sq mi)
- Time zone: UTC+1 (CET)
  - Summer (DST): UTC+2 (CEST)
- Postal code: 05-230
- Area code: +48 22
- Car plates: WWL
- Website: http://www.kobylka.pl/

Kobyłka [kɔˈbɨu̯ka] is a town of almost 22,000 inhabitants in Poland within the Warsaw metropolitan area, located right outside of the Warsaw, near Wołomin in the Wołomin County in the Masovian Voivodeship.

== History ==
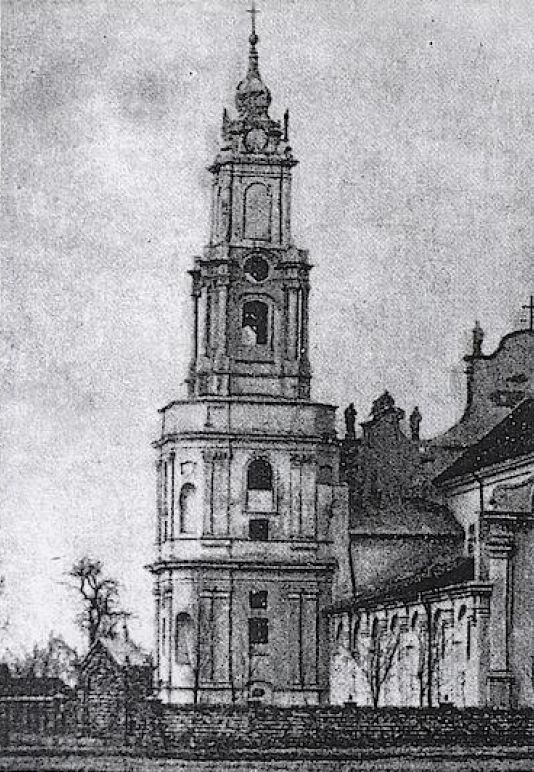
Holy Trinity church in 1900

Located in a densely forested area, Kobyłka has been a village at least since the 15th century. In the 18th century the village was one of the main centres of production of Kontusz Belts. In 1751 the village was granted with a royal town charter, as an effect of extensive efforts of its owner, Bishop Marcin Załuski, who wanted to turn it into a large centre for pilgrims. However, the plan failed in the effect of the Kościuszko's Uprising and the Partitions of Poland, during which the town was severely damaged by Russian forces during their march towards the Warsaw's suburb of Praga.

Following the German-Soviet invasion of Poland, which started World War II in September 1939, Kobyłka was occupied by Germany until 1944. At least one inhabitant of Kobyłka was murdered by the Russians in the Katyn massacre in 1940.

== Transport ==
There are two railway stations in the town (Kobyłka and Kobyłka Ossów), located on the Polish Rail Line No. 6 connecting Warsaw with Białystok and the border crossing at Kuźnica.

== Sports ==
The local football club is Wicher Kobyłka. It competes in the lower leagues.
