= Spongarda =

Italian cake

- Alternative names: Spongarda di Crema
- Type: Cake
- Place of origin: Italy
- Region or state: Crema, Lombardy
- Serving temperature: Room temperature
- Main ingredients: Flour, butter, sugar, honey, almonds, spices, hazelnuts, walnuts, candied fruit, raisin, pine nuts
- Ingredients generally used: Mostaccino, cinnamon, turmeric, vanilla essence, apricot jam
- Variations: Torrone

Spongarda is a local cake originating in the comune (municipality) of Crema. The Lombardy region includes it as spongarda of Crema in the list of traditional food products.

== Origin of the name ==
In Crema the name has been documented since 1755, but its origins date back to a type of pastry quoted by a historian from Crema, Pietro Terni, for a feast in 1526, a soft and spongy cake, from the Latin spongia.

== Features ==
Spongarda is a flat cake, made of a compact dough, gently pinched and pierced on the sides and on the top. It has a rich filling stuffed with dried fruit, candied fruit and spices. The recipe refers to other cake in other regions, the spongata of Brescello and the spungata of Sanzana are among the most famous. The origins of the filling date back to the Renaissance as regards the use of spices. It is produced in bakery laboratories of Crema, being a complex pastry. In 2009 some of them got associated to the so-called Congrega della Spongarda (lit. 'Coven of Spongarda') in order to protect and promote its spread outside its original area.

== Ingredients ==
It is prepared with flour, sugar, butter, honey, cinnamon, spices, almonds, walnuts or hazelnuts, raisin and candied fruit. Some people crumble within a mostaccino (spicy biscuit of Crema used in tortelli cremaschi) instead of using spices.

== See also ==
- List of Italian desserts and pastries
