= Episcopal Seminary of Crema =

Roman Catholic seminary in Crema, Italy

- Seminario vescovile di Crema
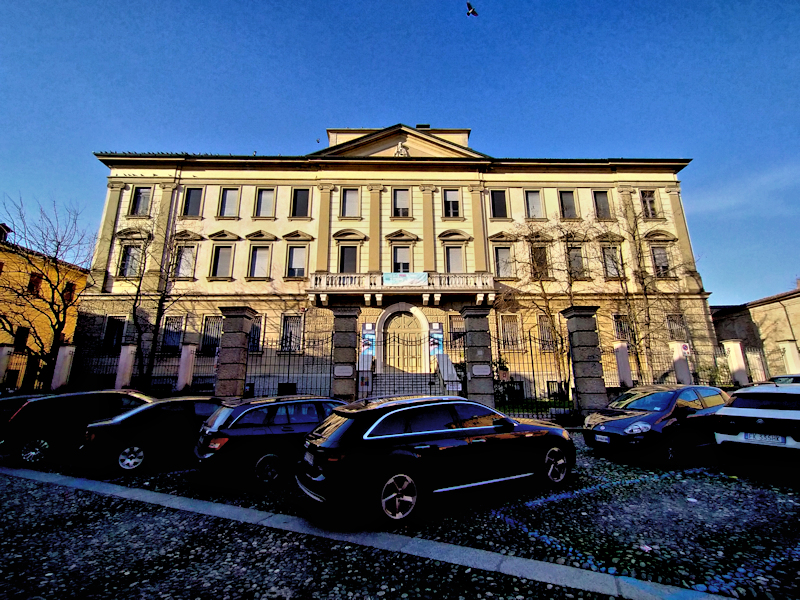
- The facade.

General information
- Status: In use
- Architectural style: Neo-Renaissance
- Location: Via Dante Alighieri, 24, Crema, Italy
- Coordinates: 45.36165°N 9.6904°E
- Year built: 1935-1936
- Inaugurated: June 1937
- Owner: Roman Catholic Diocese of Crema

Technical details
- Floor count: 3

Design and construction
- Developer: Franco Belloni
- Engineer: Antonio Premoli and Eugenio Marignoni

The Episcopal Seminary of Crema is the diocese's institution for the training of future priests. Although the figure of the rector is still present since 2018 theological studies are carried out in interdiocesan seminaries.

== History ==
=== Foundation and first location ===
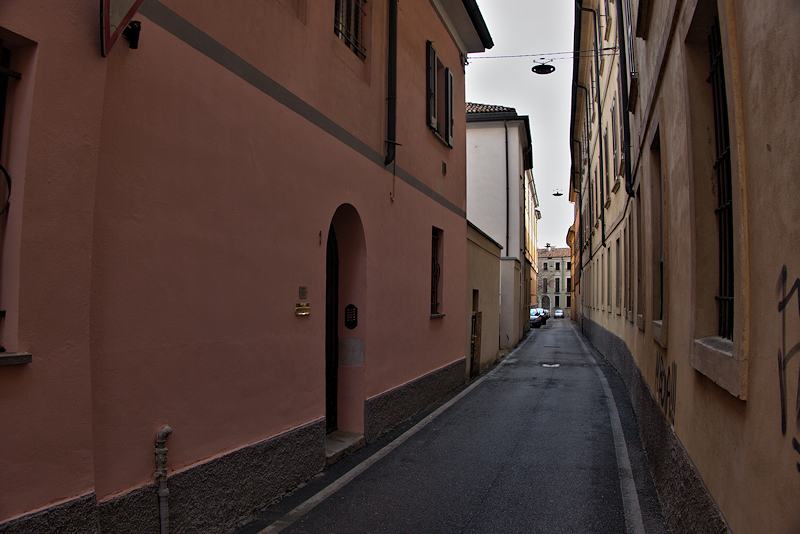
Via Vincenzo Petrali, formerly Contrada del Seminario vecchio where the first seminary was located.

After the creation of the diocese of Crema, the decision to establish the seminary was made during the first synod of September 15, 1583 by the vicar of the bishop Girolamo Diedo, Monsignor Eugenio Sabino who had arrived from Rome, who decreed that, according to the Council of Trent, all beneficiaries should pay half a tithe.

An old building located in what is now Via Vincenzo Petrali was chosen as the site, a street that was still identified as Contrada del Seminario vecchio (Old Seminary District) in the 19th century.

In 1584 Monsignor Diedo assigned some benefices to the Seminary to make it financially autonomous by taking them from some parishes: two (called Santo Sepolcro) from the church of the Santissima Trinità, one from the church of San Martino of Capergnanica, two called Sant'Ambrogio and Santa Margherita from the church of Santo Stefano in Bagnolo Cremasco, two called San Michele and San Lorenzo in Offanengo and one from the church of San Donnino in Credera. Another was added in 1585, called the Benedetto (Blessed) by Pope Sixtus V, thus reaching an annual income of 500 gold scudi.

=== The second location ===
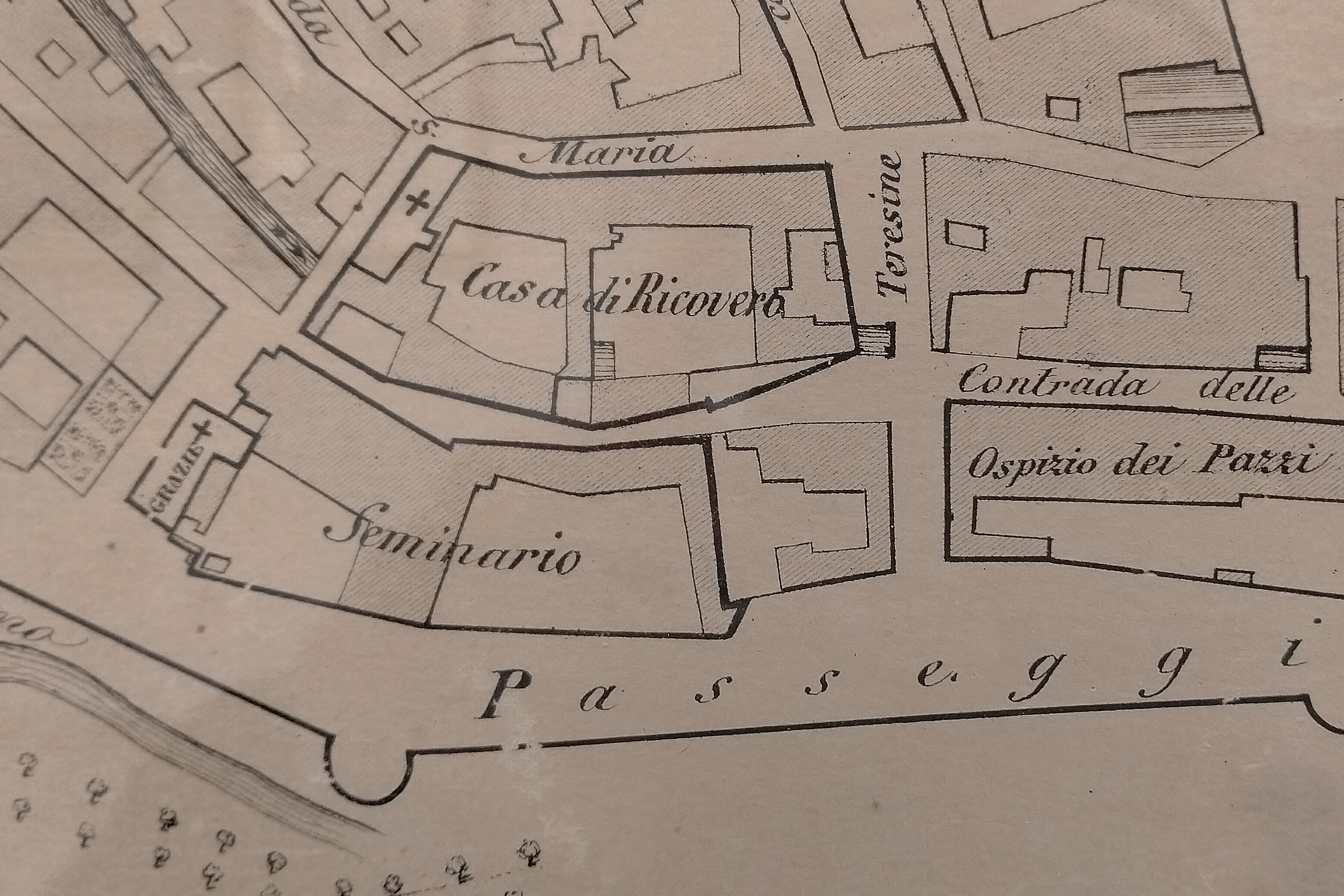
Extract from the “Map of the Royal City of Crema” by Carlo Donati, circa 1857, with the second location of the seminary (1623-1937)

In 1567 Pope Pius V had suppressed the order of the Humiliati, including the order of Saints Philip and James, which was located in the southern part of the city near the walls; his successor, Pope Gregory XIII, assigned the funds to the newly established episcopal mense.

In 1583, during his apostolic visit, Monsignor Gerolamo Ragazzoni ordered the demolition of the old church, which was done in 1592, and in 1601 the church of Santa Maria delle Grazie was built.

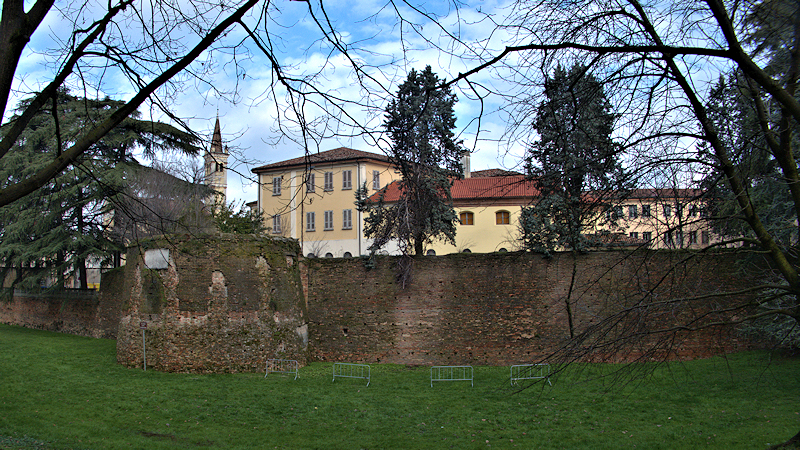
The building that housed the seminary from 1623 to 1937.

In the meantime, the house of the Humiliati had been sold in 1587 to the fathers of the Third Order Regular of St. Francis, who kept it until 1606 when they moved to the convent of Santo Spirito and Santa Maddalena. Thus, in 1623, Bishop Pietro Emo decided to transfer the seminary to this location.

The almost total rebuilding dates back to 1709, also taking advantage of the inheritance of the priest Don Giovan Battista Diotti who left an adjacent house to the institution; the project was initiated by Bishop Faustino Griffoni di Sant'Angelo who also used his own resources for the initiative.

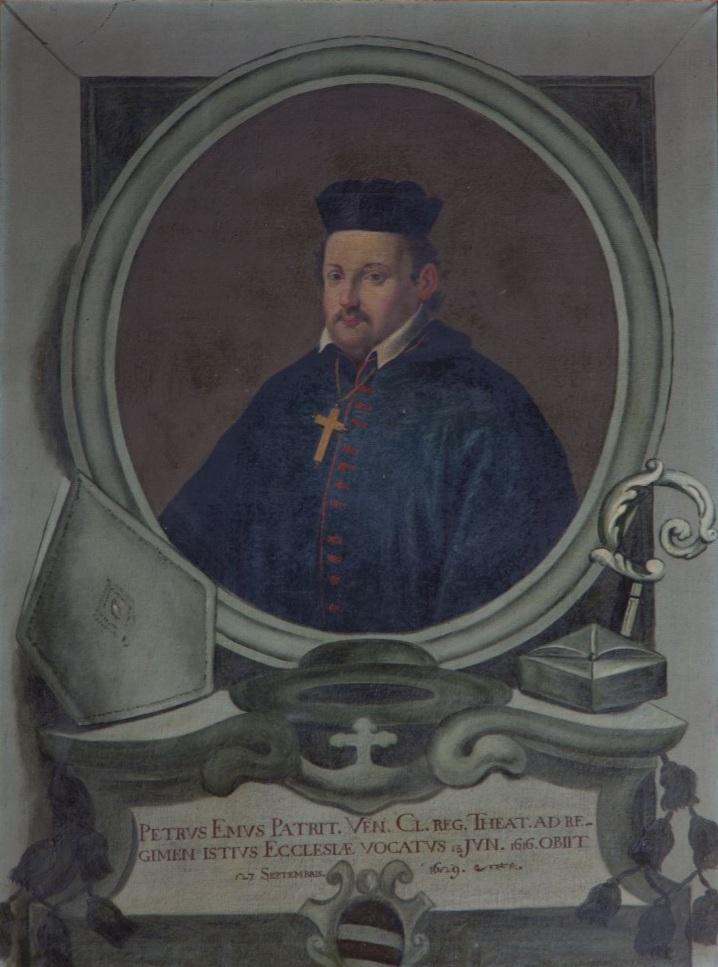
Pietro Emo, bishop from 1616 to 1629, founded the second site.

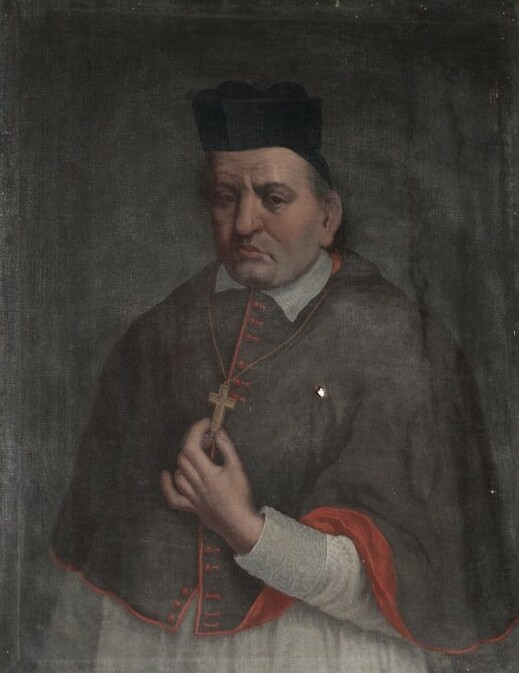
Faustino Griffoni di Sant'Angelo, bishop from 1702 to 1730, had the second site enlarged.

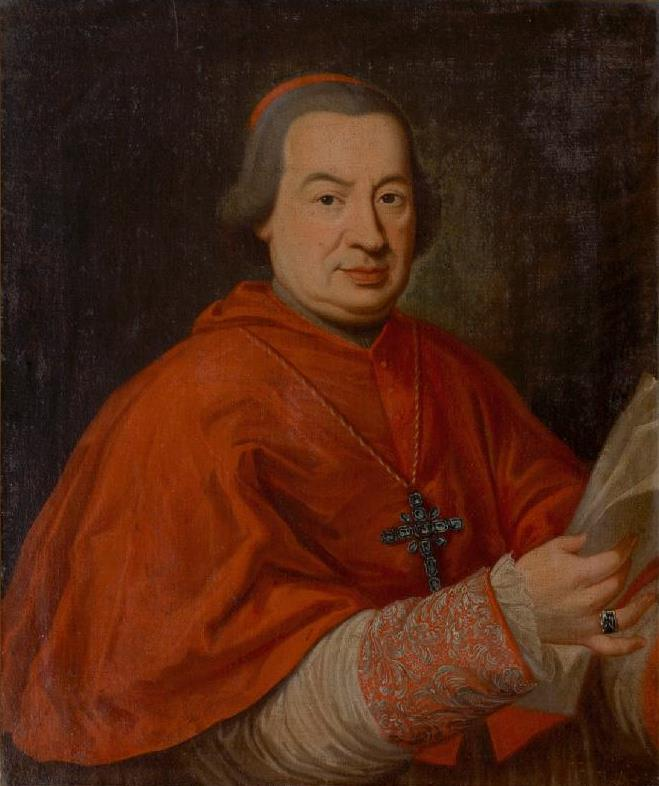
Before being appointed cardinal, Lodovico Calini was bishop of Crema from 1730 to 1751.

Bishop Lodovico Calini had the building enlarged again in 1745, but ran into trouble with the Capuchin nuns because of the windows overlooking their convent; the nuns appointed Count Ernesto Griffoni di Sant'Angelo (brother of Bishop Faustino) as their lawyer, who took the matter to the city authorities, who ordered the bishop to intervene in the construction.

Faced with what the prelate considered insults and slander, Monsignor Calini appealed to the Council of Ten; the Doge himself, Pietro Grimani, sent a letter to Podestà Lorenzo Orio, dated March 8, 1749, asking him to review the documents presented against the bishop and to remove any offensive expressions.

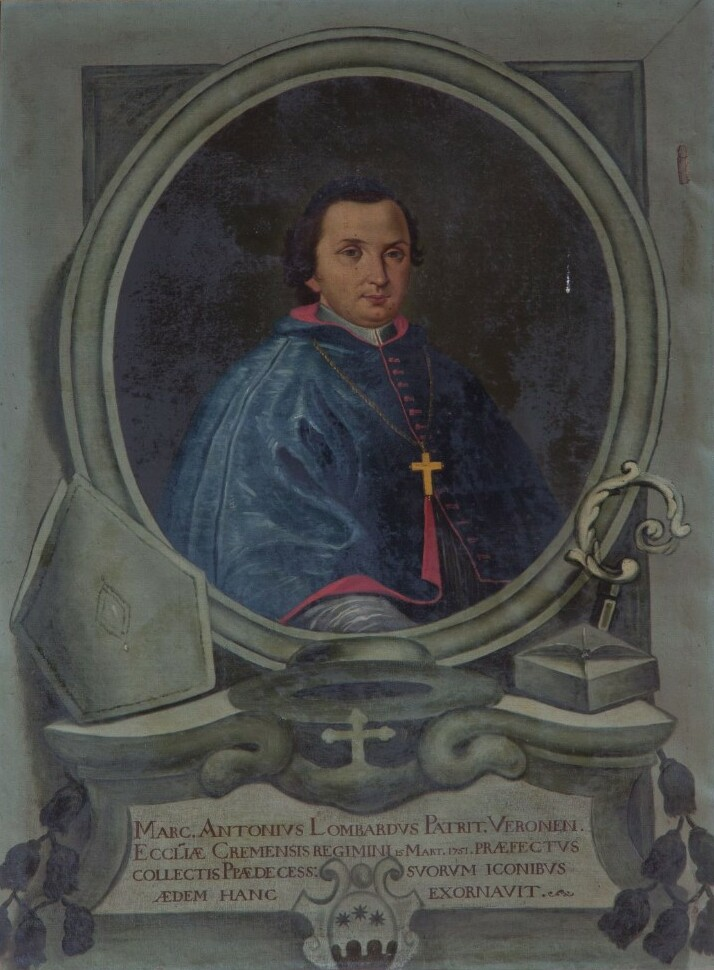
Marcantonio Lombardi, bishop from 1751 to 1782.

His successor Marcantonio Lombardi had the demolished wing rebuilt, but this time without any opposition from the sisters; Lombardi also decided to entrust the institution to the Jesuits, who were later dismissed by Bishop Antonio Maria Gardini.

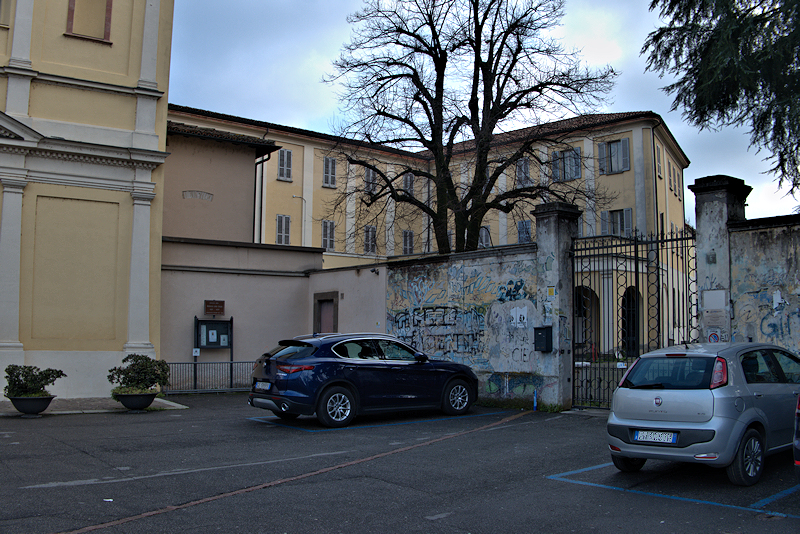
The old building.

A turbulent period began with the arrival of the French: in 1797 the complex was confiscated and used as a public school and (in 1801) as barracks; the seminarians were forced to move into the bishop's palace, while for educational purposes the Ministry of the Interior authorized the use of the guest quarters of the convent of Santa Maddalena and two rooms of the convent of San Francesco; however, in 1802 the bishop's palace was also confiscated and used as the seat of the sub-prefecture, so the clerics were housed in private homes. The income from the structure was used to contribute – together with that of the Mount of Piety – to the establishment of the public Gymnasium.

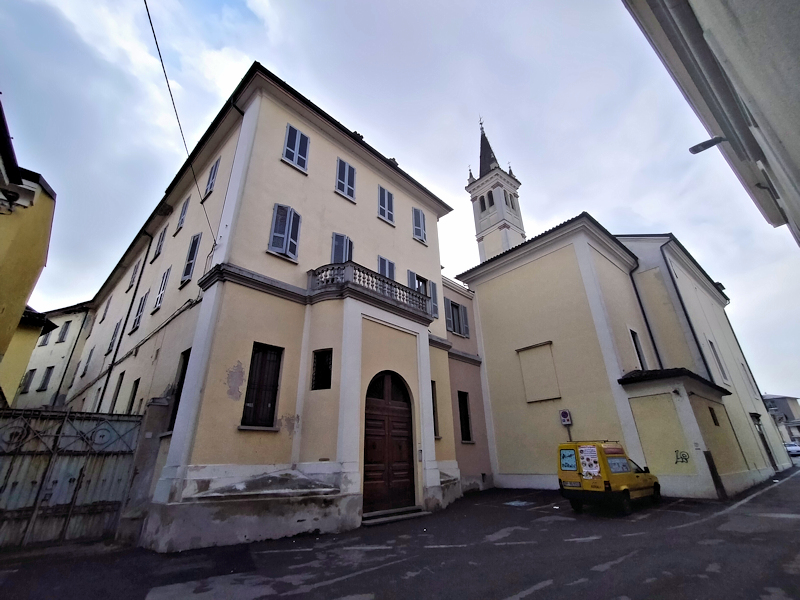
The entrance in Via Seminario, behind the sanctuary of the Madonna delle Grazie. It now houses the Luca Pacioli Institute of Higher Education.

In 1806 the seminary returned to the diocese when Monsignor Tommaso Ronna became bishop and bequeathed the institution to his universal heir.

During World War I, the building was requisitioned for military use.

After the transfer to the new location in Via Dante Alighieri in 1937, the complex was sold in 1941 to the Comboni missionaries, who set up an apostolic school there. They remained there until 1977, when it was purchased by the provincial administration of Cremona and designated as the headquarters of the Luca Pacioli Institute of Higher Education.

=== The third location ===
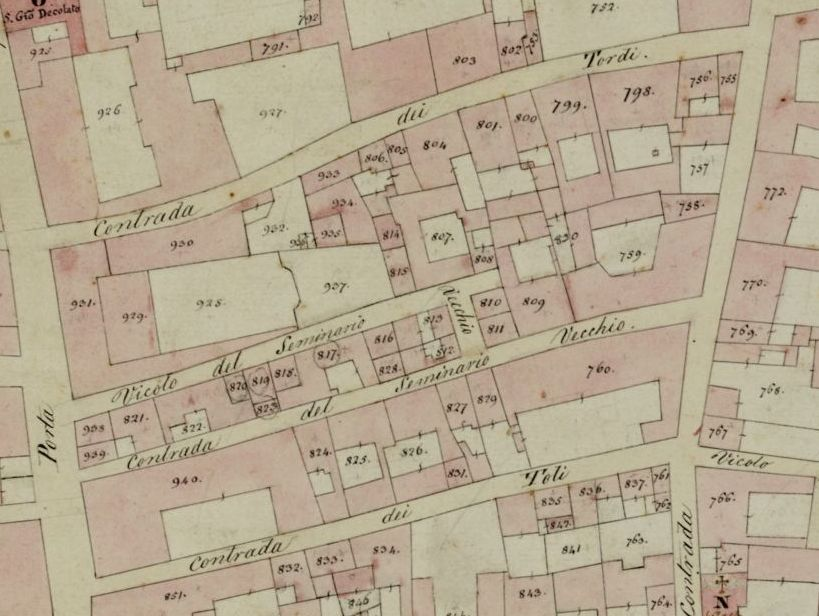
The block purchased by the Diocese, with the dense subdivision prior to the construction of the building, in a map from the mid-19th century, between the Contrada di Porta Ripalta (Via Giacomo Matteotti), the Contrada dei Tordi (Via Goldaniga) and the Contrada di Sant'Agostino (Via Dante Alighieri); note the names Vicolo del Seminario Vecchio and Contrada del Seminario Vecchio in the lower right, referring to the first location (1583-1623). Extract from the “Original map of the Municipality of Crema” 1832-1852, kept at the State Archives of Milan.

In the 1930s, the new seminary was designed and built at considerable expense. For this project, an entire block in the center of the city, between the streets now called Via Giacomo Matteotti, Via Goldaniga, Via Vincenzo Petrali, and Via Dante Alighieri, was purchased, including the Palazzo Bonzi and the demolition of the dilapidated house of the Sisters of the Good Shepherd, providing a surface area of 6,500 square meters.

The project was entrusted to engineer Antonio Premoli (mayor from 1934 to 1942) who, together with surveyor Eugenio Marignoni, had opened an office in Via Frecavalli. The foundation stone laying ceremony took place on the day of the Assumption in 1934, although the actual work began in November and ended in October 1936; a lot of material recovered from the demolition of previous buildings was used for the construction; the solemn blessing took place on November 12th by Cardinal Ildefonso Schuster, invited by the bishop Monsignor Francesco Maria Franco. Monsignor Giovanni Cazzani (bishop of Cremona) and Monsignor Pietro Calchi Novati (bishop of Lodi) also participated in the ceremony. This was followed in June 1937 by the inauguration with Cardinal Carlo Dalmazio Minoretti.

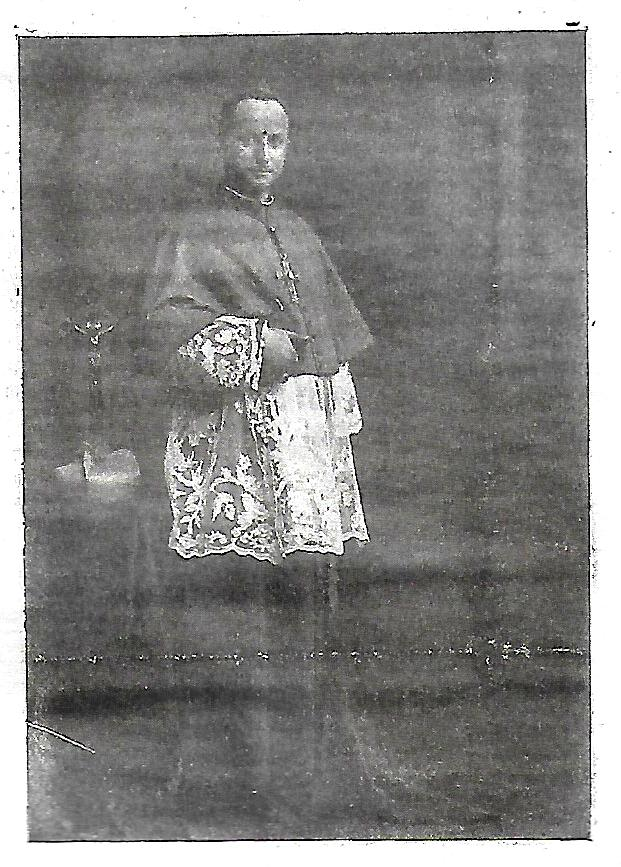
Francesco Maria Franco, bishop from 1933 to 1950.

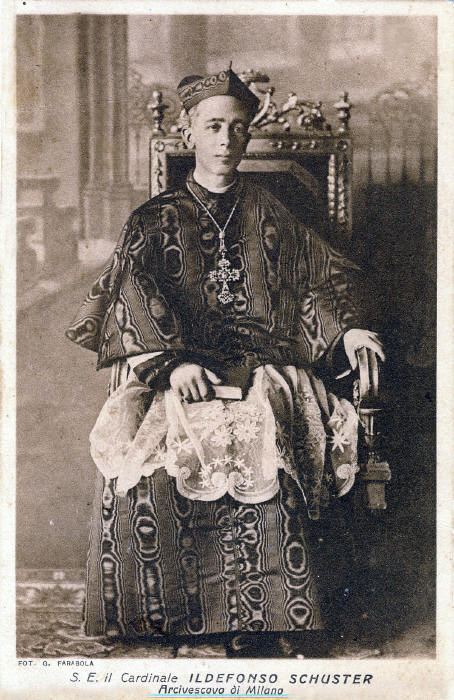
Cardinal Alfredo Ildefonso Schuster.

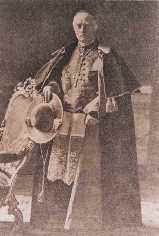
Cardinal Carlo Dalmazio Minoretti was bishop of Crema from 1915 to 1925.

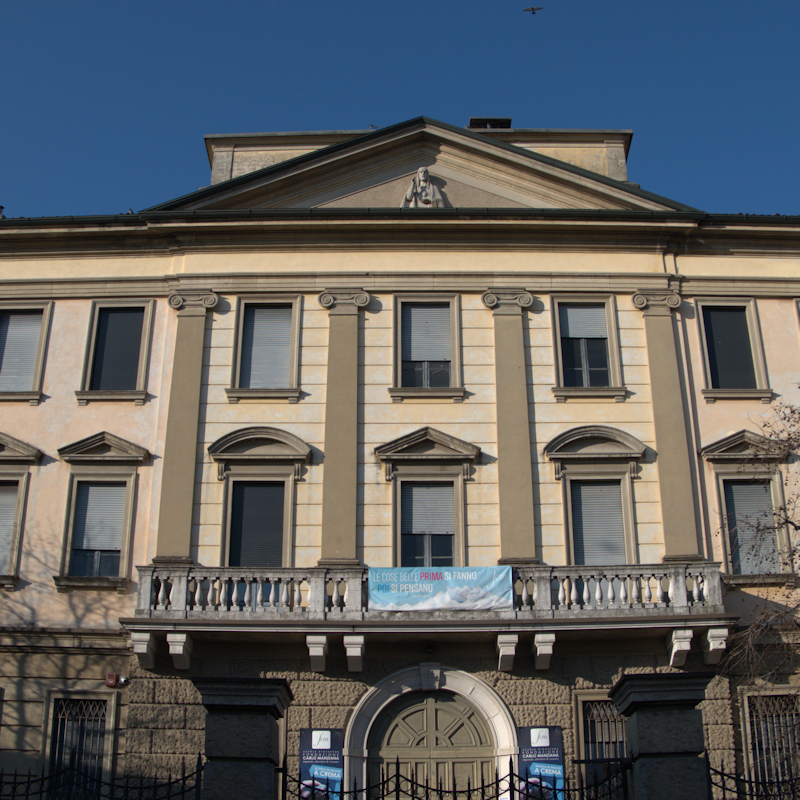
Detail of the facade.

The design of the façade is inspired by Renaissance principles, without any influence from the rationalist architectural trends promoted by the Fascist regime. The interior chapel, on the other hand, has a more twentieth-century inspiration, with a coffered ceiling and a cross vault above the altar, semi-columns supporting the entablature, and a loggia that functions as a matroneum above the entrance, which opens onto the hall through large openings with semicircular arches. In 1937 the organ pipes were placed in this loggia, built by the firm Benzi e Franceschini and electrified by the firm Inzoli; the console is placed on the floor of the church.

Subsequently, initiatives were planned to repay the debt incurred, such as the proclamation of a Seminary Day to be held in all the parishes with a collection for this purpose.

During World War II, the dormitory of the wing facing Via Petrali was occupied by the army, who stored beds and blankets there with the aim of setting up a military hospital. This was in fact set up at the new headquarters of the Sisters of the Good Shepherd, but many household goods were left there; in 1944 the central dormitory was requisitioned again to provide accommodation for some evacuees from Montecassino, while the seminarians made do as best they could in the only remaining dormitory; the kitchen run by the Red Cross was set up in the Bonzi palace.

After the bombings of the autumn of 1944, Monsignor Franco, realizing that the seminary had no shutters and therefore could not be completely darkened, decided to remove the clergy; the theology students were housed in the oratory of Chieve, while those of the first classes were redirected to Casaletto Ceredano; the entire building was militarized and an anti-aircraft post was set up on the roof.

Upon their return to the diocese, the seminarians resumed their studies, organized in two levels, middle school and classical high school, with a percentage of between 25 and 35 percent of the students who continued their theological studies to be ordained priests. Although in 1957-1958 there were 78 students, Monsignor Placido Maria Cambiaghi, in his Lenten Letter of 1959, expressed the first concern about the lack of vocations.

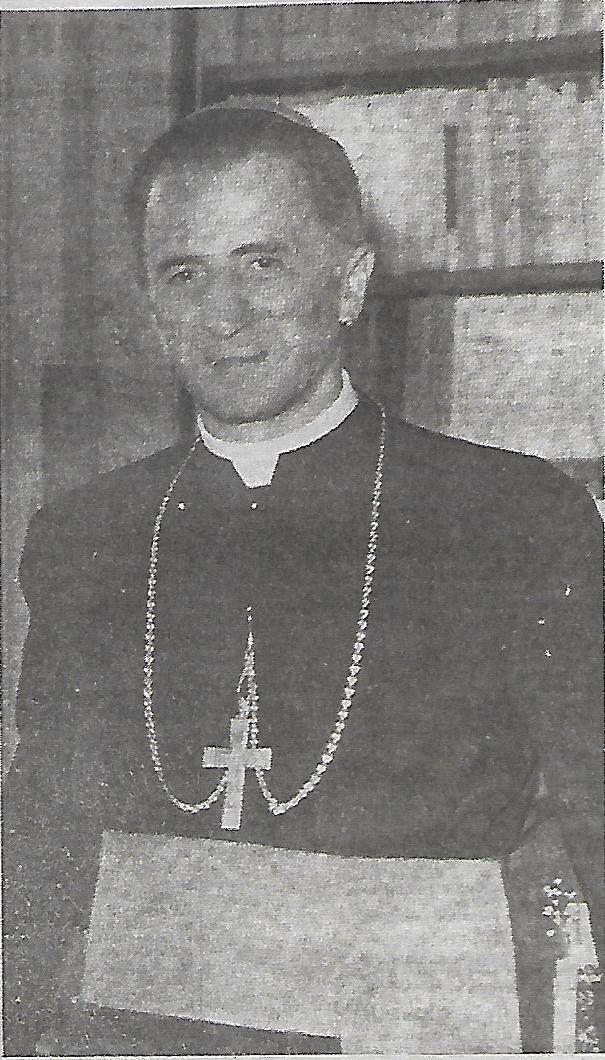
Cardinal Marco Cé was rector of the seminary from 1959 to 1970.

In the mid-sixties there were 89 seminarians, of whom 42 percent became priests, a much higher percentage than the national average of 10-15 percent. The rector from 1957 to 1970 was the priest Marco Cé, future auxiliary bishop of Bologna (1970), later patriarch (1978) and cardinal (1979) of Venice. Under his guidance the seminary was reformed, anticipating some of the guidelines that were later introduced by the Second Vatican Council; until the end of the fifties, entering the seminary meant accepting its strict rules, in particular the observance of absolute obedience in a closed, rigid and cloistered community; the rectors were particularly concerned about the holidays, during which it was strongly recommended not to go to the movies, not to watch television, not to listen to the radio, not even to read newspapers; the greatest care and prudence were to be exercised in interpersonal relationships and in personal hygiene. Monsignor Cé, in full agreement with Bishop Carlo Manziana, introduced a less monastic seminary life, which did not involve the denial of personality and was much more open to dialogue; the structure itself was also modified to make it more welcoming, for example by abolishing the dormitories in favor of individual rooms; the priests who left in those years were better prepared to apply the new dictates of the Council without the difficulties (or even, in some cases, the ostracism) of the older prelates. Nevertheless, the number of seminarians in 1971 had fallen to 65.

The progressive decline in attendance continued throughout the rest of the 20th century, so much so that the newly elected bishop (1996) Monsignor Angelo Paravisi began to question the function of the now oversized building and promoted the project of a more suitable structure in the hamlet of Vergonzana, inaugurated in 2002.

Meanwhile, on December 23, 2000, the Carlo Manziana Foundation was established and entrusted with the management of the Dante Alighieri secondary school and high school, the Paola Di Rosa and Canossa nursery schools, and the Ancelle della Carità, Canossa and Pia Casa della Provvidenza primary schools, with the aim of providing a complete range of public, non-governmental and equal education from infancy to high school. The building was therefore intended for exclusive school use.

=== The fourth location ===
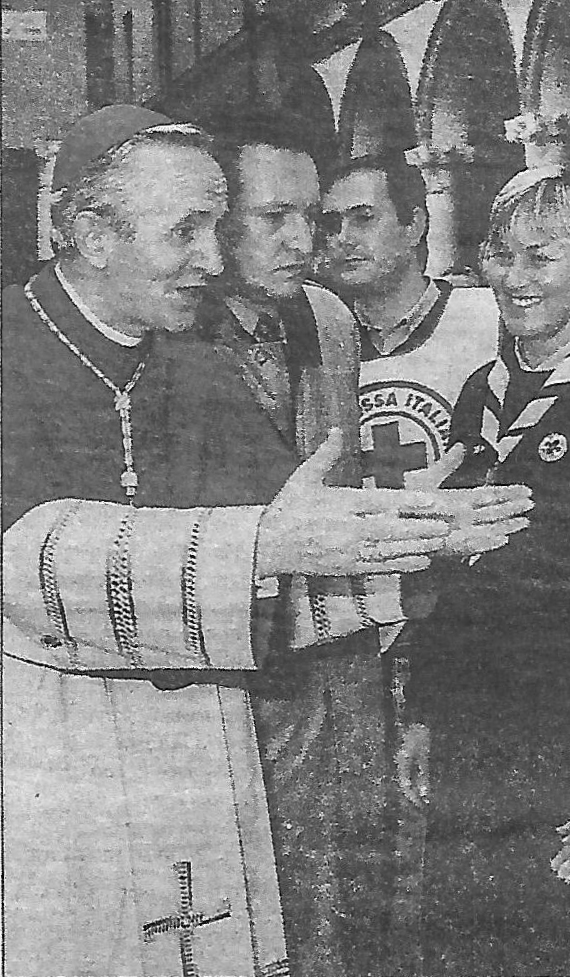
Monsignor Angelo Paravisi, bishop of Crema from 1996 to 2004.

One of the first initiatives of Bishop Angelo Paravisi was the promotion of vocations. With the aim of applying new educational requirements, he was the advocate for the construction of a new seminary. In 1999 a farmhouse was purchased in the hamlet of Vergonzana. Its partial reconstruction and adaptation began with the symbolic laying of the foundation stone on December 8, 2000.

The project, designed by architect Claudio Bettinelli, was based on preserving the form of the farmhouse with courtyard and creating thirteen apartments, a meeting room, dormitories, garages, a kitchen and a large dining room.

In an old barn, a chapel was built with an altar in rough travertine and seats arranged in a semicircle; on the wall behind the altar, a rose window was made with a design depicting Jesus giving the Eucharist to the apostles by Eugenio Cerioli. A processional cross by Mario Toffetti was placed at the side of the altar.

The work was completed in 2002 and a series of events were organized for the inauguration, which took place over several days, from September 24 to 27. The blessing on Sunday the 27th was presided by Cardinal Marco Cé; in addition to Bishop Paravisi, Bishop Emeritus Libero Tresoldi and Bishop Franco Croci (Secretary of the Prefecture for the Economic Affairs of the Holy See) were present; the facility was named after Pope John XXIII, a fellow countryman of Paravisi.

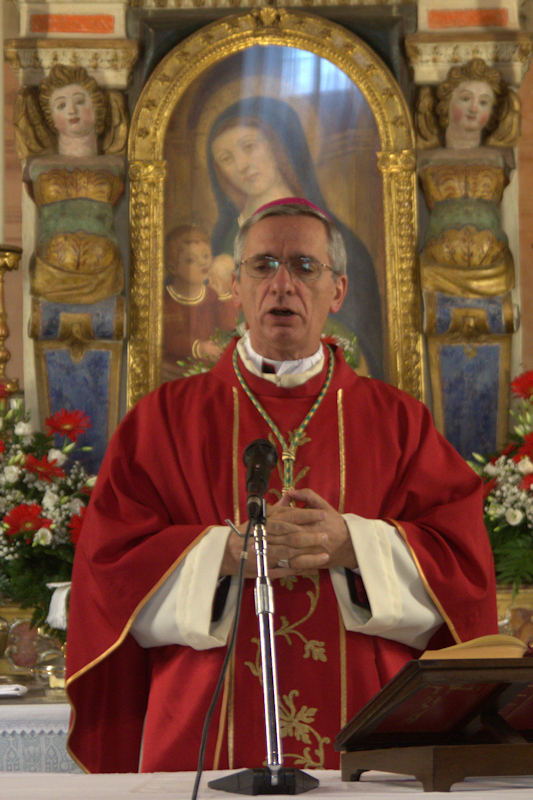
Monsignor Daniele Gianotti, bishop of Crema since 2017.

During that year, 26 children and adolescents attended the Institute: 13 were enrolled in lower secondary school, 9 in upper secondary school and were present in Vergonzana sometimes one or two days a week; four young theology students, on the other hand, lived there permanently.

Over the years, the number of those studying theology continued to decrease; at the beginning of 2017 there were six, but with the priestly ordinations in June, this number was reduced to three. While Bishop Oscar Cantoni, during a council in 2016, had already considered other options, his successor, Monsignor Daniele Gianotti, consulted with the bishops of Vigevano and Lodi, so that the studies of the seminarians from the year 2017-2018 would continue in the city.

On January 29, 2018, Pope Francis promulgated the Apostolic Constitution Veritatis gaudium, which introduced a reform of theological formation; its application from 2023 provides for the presence of a minimum number of 25 students and an adequate number of teachers. Therefore, the dioceses of Crema, Pavia, Vigevano and Lodi decided to merge - totally or partially - with the Episcopal Seminary of Bergamo. The figure of the rector remains.

Regarding the Vergonzana complex, in 2018 it was rented to an educational community aimed at the recovery of minors in social and family difficulties.

== See also ==
- Roman Catholic Diocese of Crema
- Marco Cé

== Bibliography ==
- Various authors (1995). Cinquant'anni fa. Crema e i cremaschi dal settembre '43 all'aprile '45 [Fifty years ago. The people of Crema and the Crema area from September '43 to April '45] (in Italian). Crema: Il Nuovo Torrazzo.
- Various authors (2006). Crema tra identità e trasformazione. 1952-1963 [A balance between identity and transformation. 1952-1963] (in Italian). Crema: Centro ricerca Alfredo Galmozzi.
- Various authors (2008). Il grande cambiamento. Gli anni Sessanta a Crema e dintorni [The great change. The sixties in Crema and the surrounding area] (in Italian). Crema: Centro ricerca Alfredo Galmozzi.
- Various authors (2016). Crema e il suo Ginnasio [Crema and his Gymnasium] (in Italian). Crema: Centro ricerca Alfredo Galmozzi.
- Adenti, Vittorio (2014). Architettura e urbanistica a Crema e nel Cremasco, in Anni grigi. Vita quotidiana a Crema e nel cremasco durante il fascismo [Architecture and urban planning in Crema and the Crema area, in Gray Years. Daily life in Crema and the Crema area during Fascism] (in Italian). Offanengo: Centro ricerca Alfredo Galmozzi.
- Antonioli, Guido (2017). Antonio Premoli: il Podestà del buon governo (1934-1942), in Insula Fulcheria XLVII [Antonio Premoli: the Podestà of good government (1934-1942), in Insula Fulcheria XLVII] (in Italian). Museo civico di Crema e del Cremasco.
- Dasti, Romano; Carelli, Piero (2018). Crema in guerra, 1915-1918 [Crema in war, 1915-1918] (in Italian). Noventa Padovana: Centro ricerca Alfredo Galmozzi.
- Desti, Marita (2014). Cronaca 1926-1940 nelle pagine de «Il nuovo torrazzo», in Anni grigi. Vita quotidiana a Crema e nel cremasco durante il fascismo [Chronicle 1926-1940 in the pages of “Il nuovo torrazzo”, in Gray years. Daily life in Crema and the Crema area during Fascism] (in Italian). Offanengo: Centro ricerca Alfredo Galmozzi.
- Dossena, Alberto (2011). Regesto degli organi della diocesi di Crema in Insula Fulcheria XLI [Register of the organs of the diocese of Crema in Insula Fulcheria XLI] (in Italian). Museo civico di Crema e del Cremasco.
- Lini, Sergio (2003). Chieve. La sua storia, la sua gente [Chieve. Its history, its people] (in Italian). Comune di Chieve.
- Mori, Bruno (2021). Proprietà cittadina, contadina ed ecclesiastica a Offanengo nel 1685. in Insula Fulcheria LI [City, rural and ecclesiastical property in Offanengo in 1685. in Insula Fulcheria LI] (in Italian). Museo civico di Crema e del Cremasco.
- Solera, Giovanni (1857). Serie dei vescovi di Crema [Series of the Bishops of Crema] (in Italian). Milano: Coi tipi di Antonio Ronchetti.
- Benvenuti, Francesco Sforza (1888). Dizionario biografico cremasco [Cremasque biographical dictionary] (in Italian). Bologna: Forni editore.
- Perolini, Mario (1976). Origine dei nomi delle strade di Crema [Origin of the street names in Crema] (in Italian).
- Zucchelli, Giorgio (2004). Architetture dello Spirito: san Giovanni e le Grazie [Architectures of the Spirit: San Giovanni and le Grazie] (in Italian). Il Nuovo Torrazzo.
