= Vailati =

Vailati is a surname. Notable people with the surname include:

- Germano Vailati (born 1980), Swiss footballer
- Giovanni Vailati (1863–1909), Italian philosopher, historian of science, and mathematician
- Giovanni Vailati (1815–1890), Italian mandolinist

== See also ==
- Vailatti
