= Giuseppe Doldi =

Italian footballer

Personal information
- Date of birth: 19 March 1950 (age 76)
- Place of birth: Crema, Italy
- Height: 1.72 m (5 ft 8 in)
- Position: Midfielder

Senior career*
Years	Team	Apps	(Gls)
1968–1972	Atalanta	47	(6)
1969–1970	→ Seregno (loan)	17	(1)
1972–1974	Internazionale	11	(0)
1974–1975	Foggia	13	(2)
1975–1976	Brindisi	35	(6)
1976–1977	Livorno	26	(2)
1978–1979	Gallipoli	19	(1)
1979–1981	Pergocrema	37	(6)
1981–?	Fontanellese		
?	Cassano d'Adda		
- * Club domestic league appearances and goals

Giuseppe Doldi (born 19 March 1950 in Crema) is a retired Italian professional football player. With notable spells at Atalanta and Inter Milan, he earned the nickname "Jacky, the bandit from Crema".
