= Giovanni Vailati (musician) =

19th-century Italian mandolinist

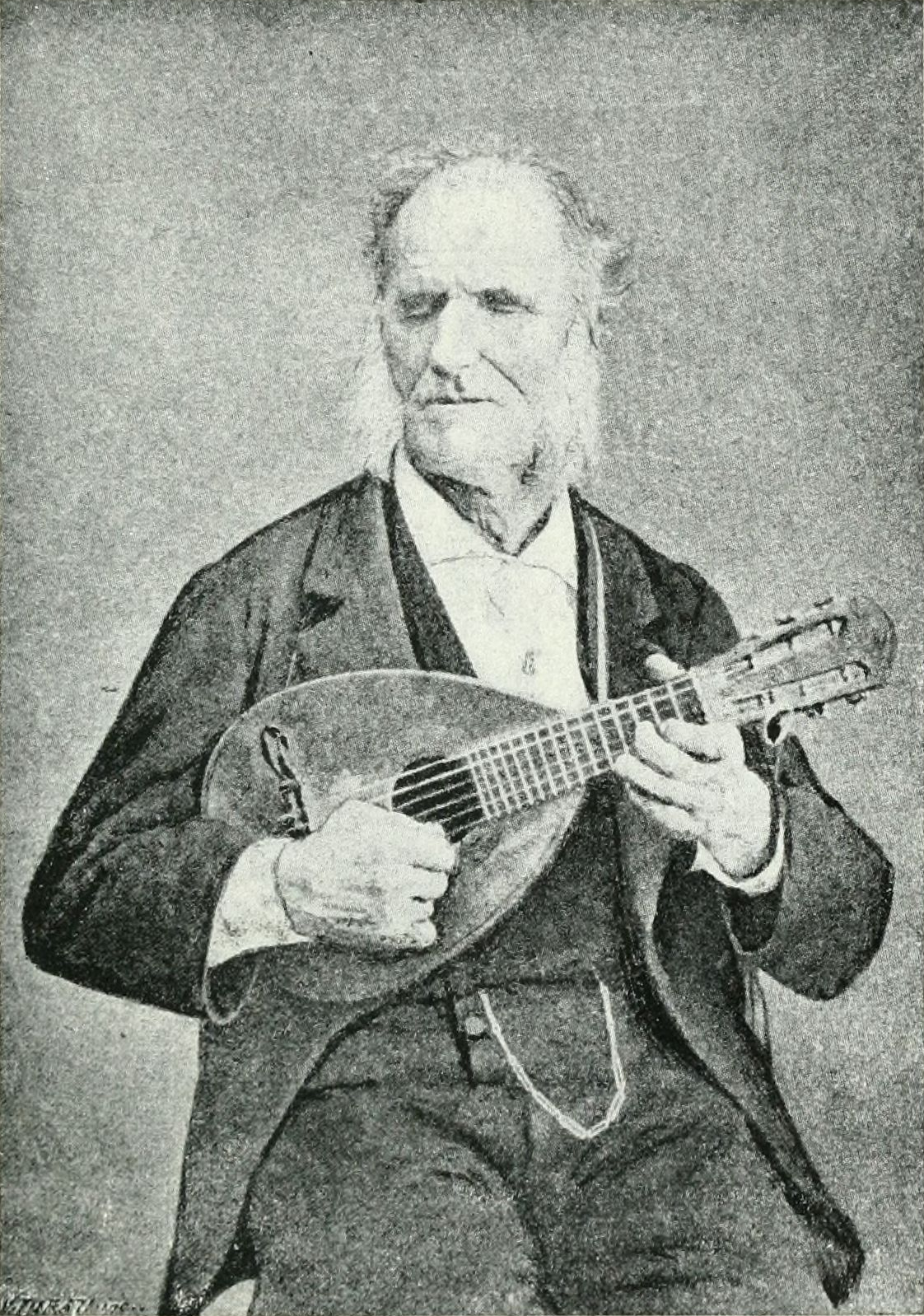
- Giovanni Vailati, mandolinist whose "marvellous and brilliant execution was the surprise of musicians."

Background information
- Born: April 13, 1815; Vairano, Crema
- Died: November 25, 1890 (aged 75) Crema, Lombardy
- Genres: classical
- Instrument: Lombardy mandolin

Giovanni Vailati (1815–1890) was an Italian mandolinist who reached the virtuosic-level of playing ability and was able to travel and perform throughout Europe. Entirely self taught on his instrument, he was described by Philip J. Bone as a "natural genius on his instrument, who by his remarkable performances, became known throughout his native land as 'Vailati the blind, the Paganini of the mandolin.'" He is important as one of the first generations of quality performers to use mandolin. He was one of a small number of mandolinists of the 19th century to play the mandolin in the concert halls of Europe after the Napoleonic War, who played with excellence in spite of indifference and diffidence toward their chosen instrument. Pietro Vimercati was another, whose concerts predated Vailati's by about 30 years. Also performing in Europe in the years following 1815 was Luigi Castellacci.

Vailati was born "at the Torchio farm in the village of Vairano in the current village of Santo Stefano," near Crema, and grew up in a rural setting. Records are confusing, and the indication is that either he was blinded soon after birth, or about age 7 from smallpox.

Taking up the mandolin, he joined the ranks of people who made a living on the streets, playing for themselves and "begging a small fee" from others. He got some help from Pietro Bottesini, the father of double-bass player Giovanni Bottesini and himself a clarinet professor. Pietro worked with him on "musical principles" and the harpsichord and violin. Bottesini was impressed with his virtuosity, particularly his ear; Vailati demonstrated the ability to retain and play music that he had heard only once or twice. He performed in the coffee shops in Crema, and then in Lombardy's other cities, building his reputation. In 1852 on December 2, 1852, at the Teatro Regio in Parma, he have a performance that was noticed. Eventually Vailati was invited and performed in England, Portugal, Sweden, Norway and Germany, which was a rare accomplishment for any mandolinist in the middle of the 19th century.

According to historian Paul Sparks, there was a decline in the use of the mandoline and mandolino (French and Italian mandolins) after 1815, and a general disinterest in plucked instruments "during the second and third quarters of the nineteenth century" to include harps, lutes, and guitars. They were surpassed by struck and bowed string instruments in the concert halls, pianos and violin-family instruments. The mandolin, which had been only been briefly allowed into the concert hall was largely excluded. It became a "folk" instrument, in an era when that went along with poverty. Although Giovanni Vailati did well as a performer, he was performing in a period when the mandolin was out of style in the concert hall. In 1855 he performed at a benefits concert at the Sala dell'Arte in Florence, and only a few people showed up; however the Gazzetta musicale di Firenze paid him tribute on its front page.

He died in the poor house in Crema, November 25, 1890. According to Bone, Vailati was betrayed by someone he had known most of his life, who stole his savings, and "being quite destitute, was forced to seek the shelter of his native poor house, where he passed the remainder of a desolate career." After he died, a monument was erected in Crema with the words "To Giovanni Vailati, the blind professor of music, who honourably upheld the name of his country over all Europe. Crema is grateful."

== Mandolins ==
Vailati played the Lombardy mandolin, an instrument "inspired by still unformed and crude sixteenth-century instruments." The Lombardy mandolin is one of the variant mandolins descending from the mandola or mandore. It is a less common instrument now than the Neapolitan mandolin, which has spread worldwide. The portrait of Vailati, published in several music journals in Europe and by Bone in The Guitar and Mandolin shows him with the instrument. His instrument in 1852 had 6 individually tuned strings, unlike the Neapolitan mandolin's strings which are tuned in pairs. It was tuned in the manner of Milanese or Lombardic mandolins, which Paul Sparks reported as being: g–b–e′–a′–d″–g″ (shown in Helmholtz pitch notation).

He later replaced his Lombardy instrument with a Hispanic instrument "of the bandurria type."

== Modern recognition ==
In 2015, people in Crema, his city, celebrated the 200-year bicentenary of his birth. The celebration included a performance by the Città di Brescia orchestra at the Sant'Agostino cultural center. The orchestra in 2015 was composed of around thirty instruments including mandolins and guitars.

It was directed by Claudio Mondonico with "embellishments" by mandolinist Ugo Orlandi. These two have been instrumental in a classical mandolin revival in Italy.
