= Palace of the Mount of Piety (Crema) =

Italian historic building

- Palazzo del Monte di Pietà
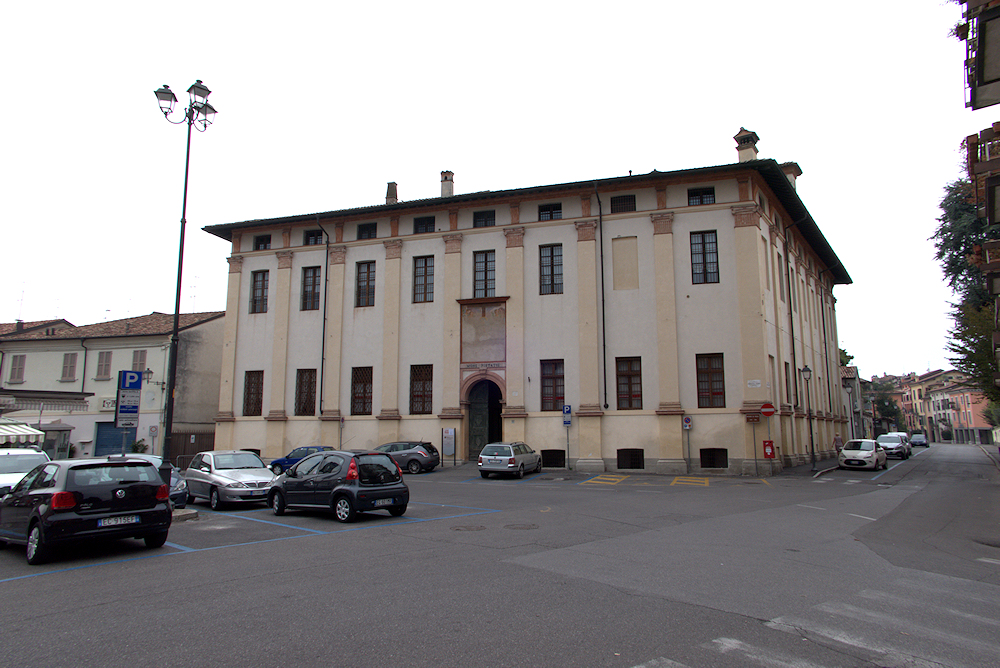

General information
- Status: Completed
- Location: Crema, Via Giuseppe Verdi, Italy
- Coordinates: 45°21′51″N 9°41′04″E
- Year built: 1569
- Inaugurated: 1586

The Palace of the Mount of Piety is located in Crema, in the Lombardy region of northern Italy. Commissioned in 1569 and completed in 1586, this building served as the institution's headquarters until 1991. Renowned for its architectural significance, the palace reflects the area's heritage and is a notable destination for those interested in history and culture.

== History ==
=== Jews in Crema ===
The earliest known document attesting to a Jewish presence is rather late compared to neighboring cities (Soncino, Cremona) and dates back to the year 1447, when Crema had become a possession of the brief Ambrosian Republic and the city government asked the new captains from Milan to confirm the facilities towards Jews already granted by the Duke of Milan, an indication that the community, however, had already been settled there for some time.

Beginning in the year 1450, when Crema became a possession of the Republic of Venice, a series of regulations known as conducts were established to govern the lives of the Jewish community. These conducts were revised several times and outlined various aspects of life for the Jews, including the interest rates they were allowed to charge in their primary activity of lending money and their relationships with other citizens. Initially, the regulations were relatively lenient, but they gradually became more restrictive. For example, there was a requirement for Jews to sew a yellow star onto their clothing as a means of identification.

The Jews of Crema, who settled in the Contrada del Ghirlo, asked the city's Grand Council in 1468 to open a synagogue, even accepting an increase in the annual census, but the Doge of Venice denied permission.

The tombstone with Hebrew characters is now on display at the Civic Museum of Crema and the Cremasque.

It is established, however, that Jews were allowed to maintain a cemetery, although its exact location remains unknown, and it was likely situated outside the city walls. Canobio, in the 19th century, mentioned the discovery of a gravestone but did not provide details about its location or purpose. More notably, in 1960, a gravestone was found on a property owned by Vimercati Sanseverino, and it was in good condition. The inscription, written in Hebrew characters, mentions Aaron Moses, son of Lacov Levi, who died in Brescia on the second day of Tishrei in the year 251 of the minor era. He was buried in Crema, and this date corresponds to 17 September in the Gregorian calendar year of 1490. (Note: The explanatory epigraph on the side of the plaque displayed in one of the cloisters of the Crema and Cremasco Civic Museum can be seen.)

There is no definitive source indicating when the Jewish community left Crema.

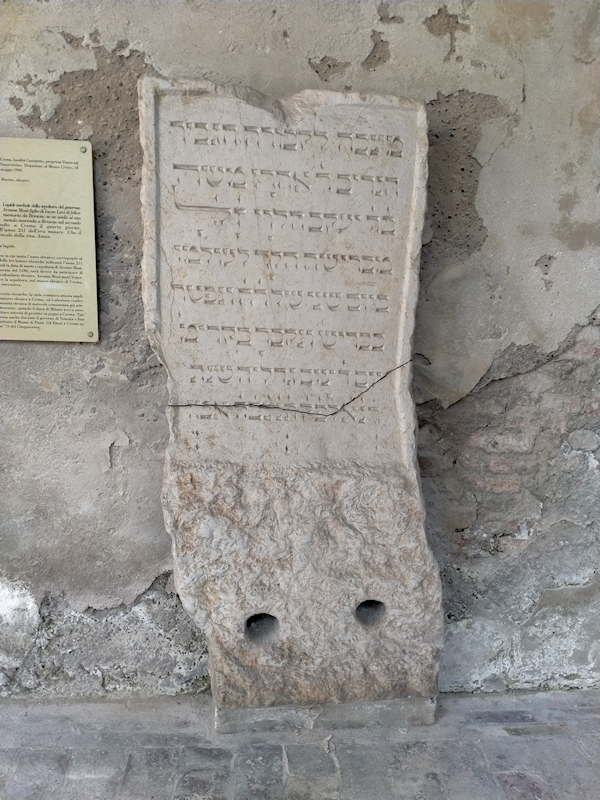
The tombstone with Hebrew characters now on display at Crema and Cremasco Civic Museum.

=== The Mount of Piety: 15th–16th century ===
The Piety Monasteries, originally established to aid the less privileged, also emerged from an anti-Jewish sentiment. These institutions spread throughout the 15th century, with the Mount of Piety in Crema being founded following a resolution by the city's Grand Council on 24 April 1496. This act formalized the creation of the institution, although the council had already allocated 200 ducats—funded by a duty on linen cloth—toward its establishment on 20 May 1492. This allocation likely followed the influence of Ludovico della Torre's sermons. On 15 July 1493, the council adopted regulations for the Mount of Piety, drawing inspiration from the model of the Mount of Piety of Padua. The local resolution was officially ratified by a ducal decree from the Venetian government on 12 July 1496.

The main proponent was the preacher Michele d'Aquis (Michele d'Acqui, Michele dell'Acque, Michele dell'Acqua), an Frias minor who was elected along with ten other citizens (Scipione Benzoni, Manfredo Lucini, Andrea Martinengo, Bartolomeo Canevari, Antonio De' Capitani, Bartolomeo Marcone Vimercati, Giacomino Zurla, Obizio De' Almenno, Giovanni Antonio Alfieri, Matteo Bravi) to the first council of the institution. The clergyman supported generous handouts, a collection concomitant with the Corpus Christi procession, and author of a competition between the four city gates, not to mention donations from nobles, clergy, and proceeds from subscriptions. A sort of confraternity also remained active for a decade, donating through the payments of voluntary adherents a sum for the Mount's treasury.

As for location, the Mount did not have its venue for the first decades of its life; it was housed initially in the house of Jacopo Zurla, then in a house belonging to the nobleman Bernardino Bremaschi; further relocation to the house of a certain Nicola Leale, moreover already previously granted to the Jews for their activity, where it remained until the completion of the palace that became its final headquarters in 1586.

In the meantime, in the year 1514, the Mount was spoliated: in that year the city was besieged by troops of the coalition between the Duchy of Milan, the Spanish Empire, and the Helvetic Confederation. The city was being defended by the condottiero Renzo da Ceri; at a critical stage of the siege, with the population at exhaustion and wages for the soldiers languishing, Renzo da Ceri took possession of the assets of the Mount of Piety and Santa Maria della Croce, having 15 coins called petacchie minted with only the image of St. Mark on one side.

As for lending, in the early years, it was free of charge, but by 1544 the Mount had already acquired a considerable real estate patrimony. However, the income was quite meager, partly due to the need to honor the testamentary bequests of benefactors. For this reason, interest-free rates were introduced for small loans, with progressively higher rates for larger sums. A few decades later, the Bishop of Piacenza, who still had jurisdiction over the city just a few months before the establishment of the Diocese of Crema, intervened, accusing the administrators of profiting from the application of interest rates, thereby violating the founding principles. The prelate directly appealed to Pope Gregory XIII who, however, absolved the leaders of the Crema institution of any wrongdoing. Similar accusations were also directed at other Mount of Piety, leading the pope on 1 May 1581, to intervene, legitimizing the application of fair interest rates, intended to pay employee wages, preserve the patrimony, and cover foreclosure costs.

==== Contrada del Ghirlo ====
Contrada of Ghirlo was the former name of Camillo Benso Street, Count of Cavour in the stretch between St. Francis Square (Madeo Square) and Goldsmith Street or the Ghetto Street or Stretta del Ghetto; the name still survived in 19th-century cartography but continued to the Contrada of St Marino at the south, at the current Aldo Moro Square. Goldsmith Street was a narrow street of narrow width that in the mid-19th century was widened and in 1873 was named after Alessandro Manzoni. Thus the Jewish community of Crema resided, roughly, in the block between Manzoni Street, Cavour Street, and Forte Street. As for the toponym Ghirlo, Zavaglio speculated that it ideally indicated a pivot on which something turns, such as the radiating of city streets from a center. More analytical was the study of Carlo Piastrella, who said it originated from girolus, gyrolus, ghirolus, derived from gyrus, a term that stood for a city wall.

=== 17th century ===
In the 17th century, the Mount of Piety of Crema became the owner of Saint Marino's church and small monastery. After the suppression of the order of the Humiliati in 1571, the estates were transformed into a simple benefice in which Monsignor Gerolamo dei Conti Pozzi e di Porciglia was invested. On his death he was succeeded by Monsignor Agostino Morosini who in 1621 ceded the former House of the Humiliati and the church to the Observants of Saint Augustine; the friars, in turn, resold the properties to the Mount of Piety of Crema in 1655.

In those pivotal years, Bishop Alberto Badoer championed the creation of a public high school to benefit eager young minds. The members of the Great Council agreed, but with a crucial stipulation: there would be no financial burden on the public body. Consequently, two schools of grammar and humanities were established, funded by the Mount of Piety of Crema, tasked also with covering the teachers' salaries. The former San Marino's House was chosen as the ideal location. Although the initial phase with lay teachers was uncertain, the expert regular clerics of St. Paul's, better known as Barnabites were invited to step in, and they committed themselves to teach with great success.

While the pope had allowed the Mount of Piety in 1581 to donate "surpluses" to charity at the discretion of the council, in 1644 Venetian inspectors made changes in the regulations ex officio, stipulating that the annual budget surpluses were to be donated exclusively to five pious places: the Capuchin nuns, the Convertite nuns, the Spinster Conservatory (Conservatorio delle Zitelle), the Beggars and the Hospital of the Exposed.

In the latter half of the 17th century, additional measures were enacted regarding the Mount; notably, in 1669, it was mandated that the institution contribute 40 ducats to support prisoners.

Yet another charge was imposed in 1679 for the purchase of a house owned by Camillo Zurla in order to make a more dignified prison out of the existing dormitories. The operation cost Mount 7 thousand liras and was almost a loss. As much as the institution was allowed to charge a fee of 4 lira a day for food for prisoners, very few could afford it. For nobles and landowners convicted of some crime, in fact, there were, as an alternative, the comfortable prisons in Porta Serio Castle.

In 1681, the Tertiary Mothers were added among the beneficiaries of donations, and in 1699 the General Hospital of Crema.

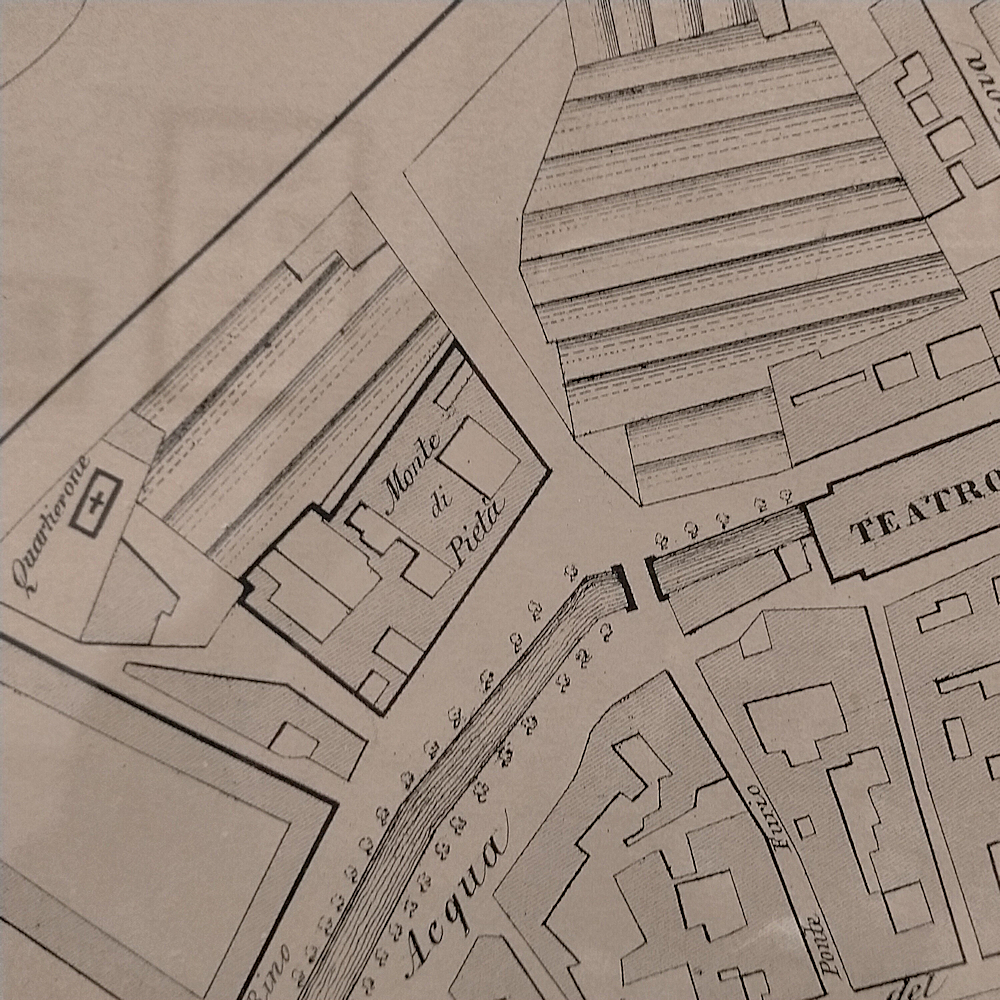
The area of the Palace of Mount of Piety from Carlo Donati's "Pianta della Regia Città di Crema," circa 1857

=== 18th century ===
Further obligations: in 1722, the Venetian Senate required the Monte to contribute to a fund intended for use in cases of health emergencies, which remained in place until 1790. However, in those early years of the century, there are records of payments for the embellishment of the cathedral and other religious works; the Municipality also received funds to repair damages to the territory caused by clashes between the Franco-Spanish forces and the Imperial forces of Eugene of Savoy. Although Venice was neutral, these conflicts also affected the Cremasque.

A loan of 5,000 ducats directed to the Republic of Venice in 1734 and a disbursement to the City of Crema to fix the roads in 1793 are documented.

Since taking on the expenses of the St Marino school had now become onerous church and convent of St Marino were donated to the Barnabite fathers in 1744, providing for an annual disbursement to the religious of 4,700 liras and with the clause that the complex would be returned if the religious abandoned Crema.

The Law of the Venetian Senate of 1767 introduced the new regulations to be applied to the Mount of Piety: the main novelty was the appointment of five individuals from among the most authoritative and accredited ones, with the name of Superintendents of the Pious Causes of this city with the task of controlling the running of the institution and the way the money was managed; the office lasted three years and the elected members were not re-eligible for the following three years. The same measure introduced the figure of a lawyer for legal and juridical dealings (1,200 liras of annual compensation); a full-time chancellor, appointed by the Great City Council upon payment of a deposit of 200 ducats and 900 liras of annual compensation; and finally, a guardian (famulo) with custodial duties and liaison among the various entities, who shared proportionally the compensation of 570 ducats annually. The podestà-captain Daniele Balbi appointed Luigi Benzoni, Marquis Benedetto Obizzi, Marquis Luigi Zurla, Faustino Griffoni of Sant'Angelo (co-supervisor), and Carlo Premoli (co-supervisor) as the first Office superintendents.

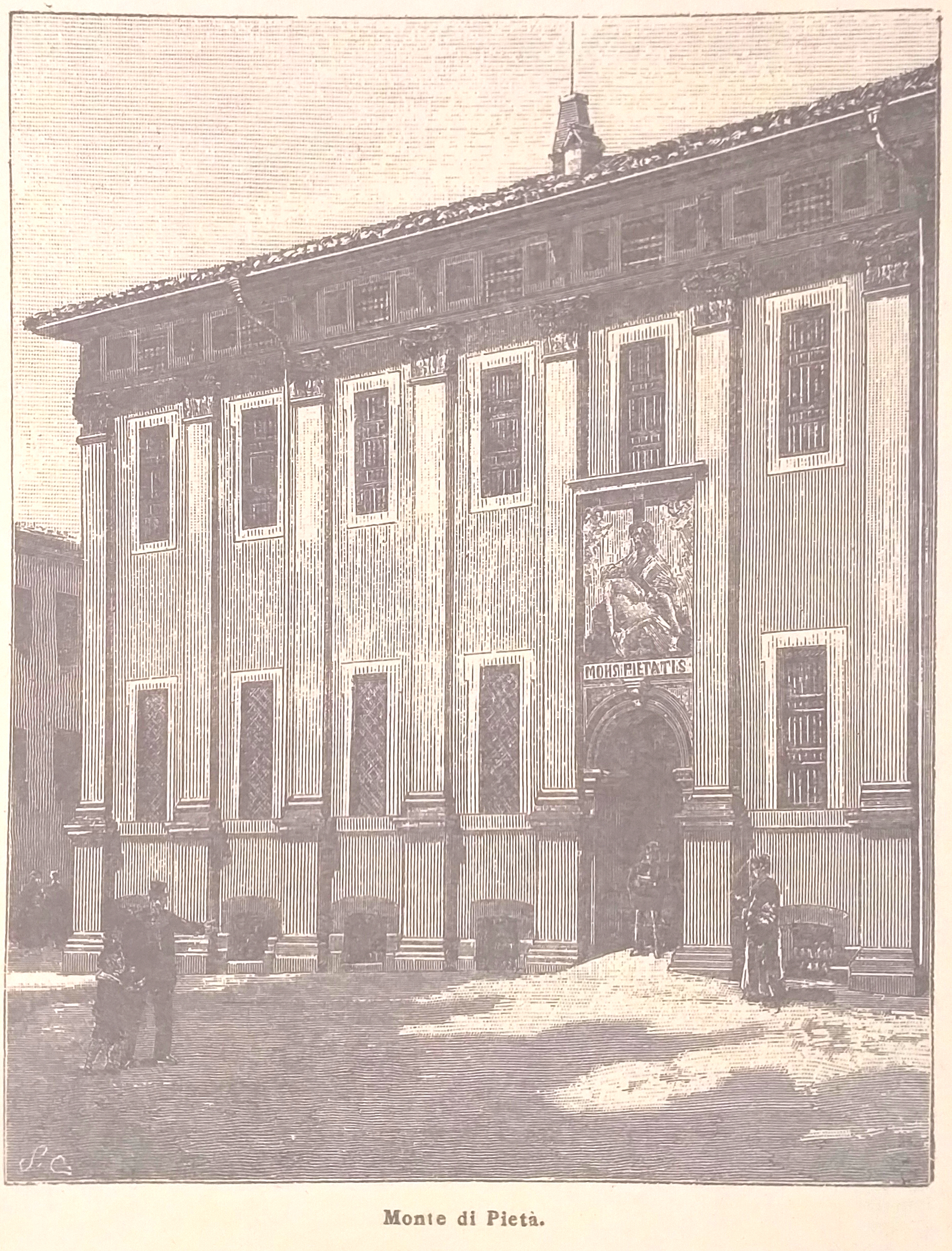
The palace at the end of the 19th century.

=== 19th century ===
With the establishment of the Cisalpine Republic in 1800 it was imposed on the Municipality of Crema the payment of 83 thousand Milanese liras on pain of military occupation by the "municipalists"; but since the public body did not have such a sum in its coffers once again it was taken ex officio from the coffers of the Mount of Piety as much as it lacked, as well as from those of the hospital.

The statute was abolished by the Cisalpine Republic in 1809, and the authorities mandated that the remaining surplus, after a 40 percent deduction, be allocated to the Casa di Ricovero (House of Shelter). Two years later the Board of Deputies, which had managed the institution since its founding, was dissolved, and its assets were transferred to the Congregation of Charity. A few years later, there was another change: the Austrian Empire restored full autonomy to the Mount.

The San Marino's complex and the new school of the Barnabite fathers had built in the meantime (the present secondary school dedicated to Giovanni Vailati) returned to the institution in 1810, when following the religious suppressions implemented by the French, were dismissed. The municipality was allowed to use the school for free, although it had to pay 4,000 liras for teachers' salaries. Shortly after the middle of the century, precisely in 1857, an agreement was established with the township that granted them perpetual use of the school building.

Subsequently, the religious and civil authorities of the parish church of St. Benedict were authorized to use the premises of the convent, which, after a few years, considering themselves almost "owners" triggered a series of periodic and complex disputes.

It was in 1859, that a new regulation was introduced, among the main changes, broadened the types of assets allowed to be pledged.

The new Italian government introduced a state law in 1862, that operated a separation of financial means derived from bequests and donations from those from pledge assets; so the administration had to adapt, introducing the new statute in 1873.

In 1879, the City of Crema requested to acquire the church and convent of San Marino for demolition to create a square. The Mount of Piety agreed to this request. An agreement was reached between the Mount of Piety and the administrators of the Exposure Hospital to use the 2,000 liras obtained from the sale of San Marino to expand the church of St. Maria Stella. This amount was allocated to the parish of Saint Benedict as compensation for the church that was lost within its jurisdiction.

A new state reform introduced in 1883, established three categories for institutions: hospitals, educational facilities, and almshouses. As a result, the Board of Trustees of the Mount of Piety was disbanded, and the Congregation of Charity was founded. This new organization consolidated the Opera Pia Verdelli, the House of the Poor, and the Mount of Piety. Between 1884 and 1885, the new leadership eliminated the passive legacies derived from inheritances and public debt securities.

=== 20th century ===
The emergence of Cooperative banks, savings banks, and mutual friendly societies from 1890 onward increased the number of critical issues that had begun to manifest themselves earlier due to new laws and statutory interventions that had led to difficulties for the continuity of financial management.

For these reasons, starting in 1903 an attempt was made on more than one occasion to apply for authorization to start credit operations, practically the establishment of a bank branch, but the proposal was always denied by several bodies, often even with contradictory reasons. In 1920 a negotiation came to an end with the Mount of Piety of Cremona, duly authorized for the exercise of credit, to open a sort of Cremasque branch on the condition that 50 percent of the profits of this branch would be allocated to Crema; the operation had little success, therefore, not producing profits the agency was closed in 1926 and the very few current account holders were absorbed by the Cassa di Risparmio while the losses were borne by the Congregation of Charity.

Also in 1926, the bylaws were revised with the intention of transforming the organization into a bank; however, this attempt was rejected by capital entities. As real estate assets continued to depreciate, the trustees, with the approval of municipal and provincial administrations and the Ministry of the Interior, decided in 1928 to dissolve the institution and transfer any remaining assets to the House of Shelter. However, in 1929 the Ministry of Agriculture intervened at this stage, halting this process and ordering the resumption of the pledge business. The extent of the Ministry's authority in this matter remains unclear, yet it also provided recommendations on the operation of the counter and the application of new interest rates. Consequently, it was necessary to amend the statutes once more, and activities officially resumed in 1934.

The municipal library was relocated to six upper rooms in 1939 and remained there until 1958 when it moved to the former St. Augustine's Convent.

An important change was Law 745 of 1 May 1938, which transformed the Mount of Piety into a legal institutions of pawn credit. The same law, moreover, suppressed the Mounts that were inactive or had negative balances for three years: thus, by decree of 22 April 1941, the Mount of Piety of Soncino was suppressed, the assets of which were transferred to Crema according to Royal Decree No. 75 of 3 February 1941:

VITTORIO EMANUELE III

BY THE GRACE OF GOD AND BY THE WILL OF THE NATION

KING OF ITALY AND ALBANIA

EMPEROR OF ETHIOPIA

[...] We have decreed and decree:

[...] Mount of Pledge Credit of Soncino, based in Soncino (Cremona), is incorporated into Mount of Pledge Credit of Crema, based in Crema (Cremona);

The acquisition of Soncino's patrimonial assets was a short-lived payoff: the economic and social crisis resulting from the unfolding of World War II led, in effect, to an increase on the part of the population in the use of pawn loans, but the pledged assets were increasingly not redeemed, and the auctions found only very few buyers. Nor did the situation improve in the postwar period: after a brief suspension in 1945, the Pawnbroker's Mount resumed its activity laboriously thanks to some benefactors, the ECA (Municipal Assistance Authority), the Popular Bank of Crema, and the Bank of Savings, but auctions were often deserted or subject to speculators who tended to the downside, and the Mount was unable to recover interest and capital.

The economic boom of the 1960s led to a significant decline in the use of pawnbroking, which became increasingly associated with lonely, unemployed, or elderly individuals facing serious survival issues. This slow decline persisted until the 1980s.

This led to 1989 when noting that the institution's functions had come to an end, the Mount's administrators decreed the start for its incorporation into the Bank of Mount of Lombardy:

By ministerial decree dated March 9, 1991, it was determined that the incorporation of the second-class Monte of credit on pawn of Crema, located in Crema, and of the Mounts reunited of credit on pawn of Brescia, located in Brescia, in the bank of the Lombardy mountain, located in Milan, ordered by presidential decree dated January 17, 1991, will take effect as of January 1, 1991.

As for the historic building, after an attempt to sell it back to the City of Crema, which declined to negotiate, it was purchased by a private company, which after a general renovation devoted it to housing offices and financial activities.

=== Benefactors ===
Over the centuries there were many benefactors who increased the estate with donations and bequests. Here are some of them:

- 1499: Antonio Da Monte, known as Mora, named the Ospedale degli Infermi his heir, binding 300 ducats to the Monte di Pietà.
- 1502: Bernardino Benvenuti, named the Monte his universal heir, obliging it to dispense four dowries every year to as many young and honest maidens.
- 1524: nobleman Luigi Verdelli, his inheritance was to be used to constitute dowries of 50 lire in favor of unmarried young women.
- 1549: Michele Cerri, artisan, and member of the Great Council, named the Mount his universal heir.
- 1576: Emilia Zurla, widow of Marquis Scipione Piacentini, bequeathed half of her substance (the other half was inherited by the Hospital of the Infirm) with the legacy of marrying seven poor maidens, giving them 25 ducats for their dowry.
- 1619; Francesco Coldaroli De Musinappi, named the Mount his heir with the legacy of a daily mass.
- 1883; Giuseppe Mandricardi, named the Mount his heir with the obligation of a legacy in favor of the Hospital of the Infirm.

=== Urban Dedication ===
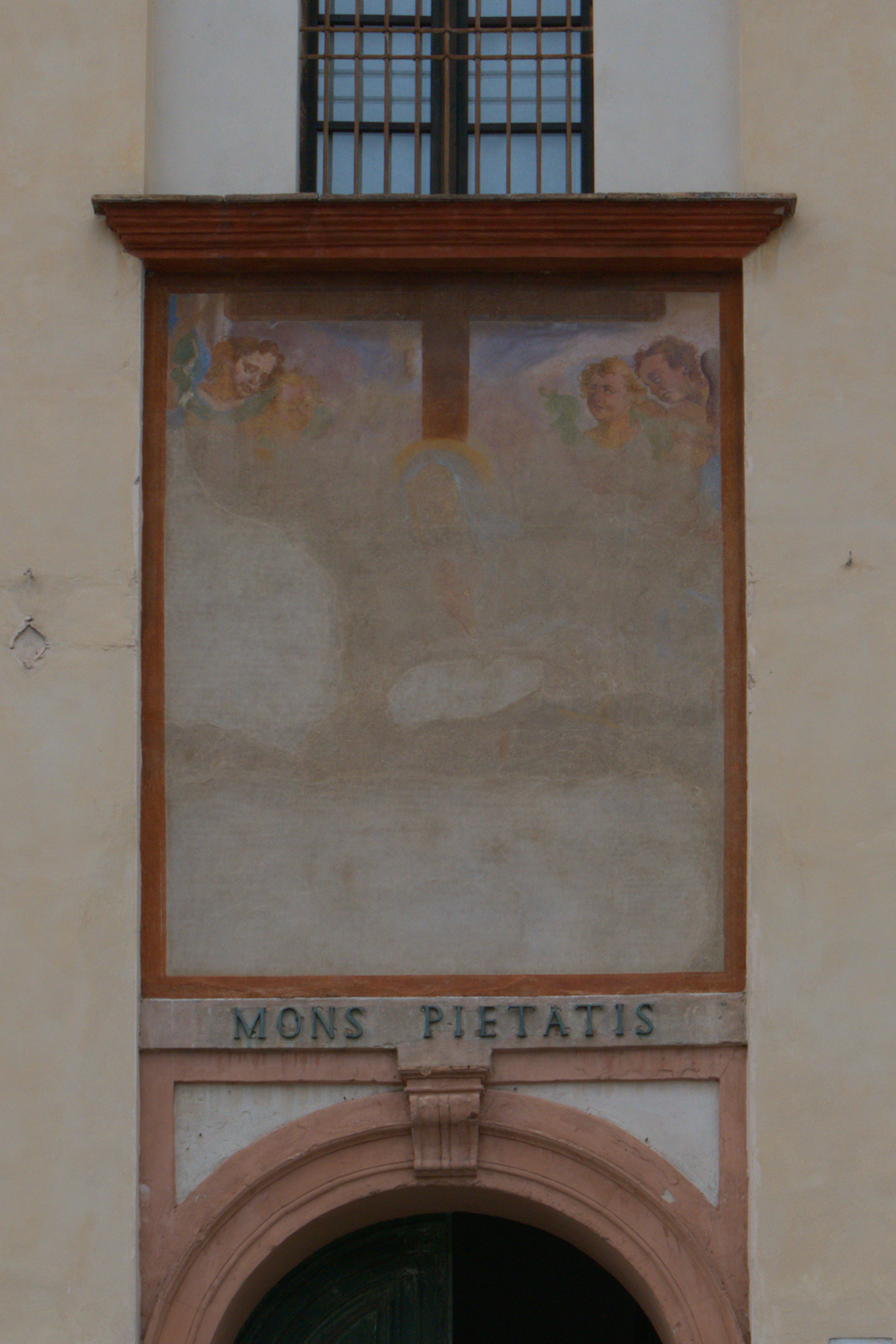
Detail of what remains of the fresco, above the entrance portal.

The palace arose in an area only a few decades ago incorporated into the Venetian walls of Crema, beyond the Crema irrigation ditch – tombed in 1952 to build the covered market there – along a street called Contrada di là dell'acqua, Contrada dietro l'acqua, Strada dietro l'acqua, Viale all'acqua. By a City Council resolution in 1871, the name was changed to Monte di Pietà Street, taking its cue from the pawnshop. The new name change occurred in 1941 when the podestà named the street after Italo Balbo; at the end of the war the dedication to Mount of Piety returned until the decision to name the street after Giuseppe Verdi in 1951, the fiftieth anniversary of the composer's death. At the same time the artery parallel to the eastern side of the building, until that year considered simply the extension of Ponte Furio Street, was renamed Mount of Piety Street.

== Features ==
The palace has a facade that is highly developed in height and divided by nine pilasters of Ionic order resting on a high pedestal. Two orders of windows protected by wrought-iron grilles open between the pilasters, with the only difference, on the ground floor, being the entrance portal profiled in terracotta surmounted by the inscription MONS PIETATIS and a mirror with traces of a fresco depicting La Pietà.

The pilasters culminate in Corinthian-style terracotta capitals supporting a string-course cornice with corbels. Within this cornice, rectangular windows align with the lower openings.

== See also ==
- Mount of piety

== Bibliography ==
- Lini, Sergio (2004). Il Monte di Pietà di Crema (1496–1988) [The Mount of Piety of Crema (1496–1988)] (in Italian). Leva Artigrafiche.
- Fino, Alemanio (1844). Storia di Crema raccolta da Alemanio Fino dagli annali di M. Pietro Terni, ristampata con annotazioni di Giuseppe Racchetti per cura di Giovanni Solera [History of Crema collected by Alemanio Fino from the annals of M. Pietro Terni, reprinted with annotations by Giuseppe Racchetti edited by Giovanni Solera] (in Italian). Milan: Colombo & Cordani.
- Benvenuti, Francesco (1859). Storia du Crema [History of Crema] (in Italian). Milan: Coi tipi di Giuseppe Bernaordoni di Gio.
- Benvenuti, Francesco (1888). Dizionario biografico cremasco [Cremasque biographical dictionary] (in Italian). Crema: Tipografia Editrice Cazzamalli.
- Le biblioteche d'Italia fuori di Roma: storia, classificazione, funzionamento, contenuto, cataloghi, bibliografia [The libraries of Italy outside Rome: history, classification, operation, contents, catalogs, bibliography] (in Italian) (1 ed.). Annales Institutorum. 1942.
- Perolini, Mario (1976). Origine dei nomi delle strade di Crema [Origin of Crema's street names] (in Italian).
- Piantelli, Francesco (1985). Folclore cremasco [Cremasque folklore] (in Italian). Arti grafiche cremasche.
- Favole, Paolo (1996). Storia urbana di Crema in Insula Fucheria [Urban history of Crema in Insula Fucheria] (in Italian). Crema: Leva Artigrafiche.
- Piantelli, Annamaria (2010). Crema, passeggiando guardando i palazzi [Crema, walking around looking at the palaces] (in Italian). Spino d'Adda: Grafin.
- Ruggeri, Elia (2013). Cronologia sulla chiesa e convento di Sant'Agostino a Crema, in Insula Fulcheria XLIII [Chronology on the church and convent of St. Augustine in Crema, in Insula Fulcheria XLIII] (in Italian). Museo civico di Crema e del cremasco.
- Delcorno, Pietro (2020). All'ombra del gigante: Il Monte di Pietà nell'azione di Timoteo da Lucca e Michele d'Acqui, in Credito e Monti di Pietà tra Medioevo ed età moderna: Un bilancio storiografico [In the Shadow of the Giant: The Mount of Piety in the Action of Timothy of Lucca and Michele d'Acqui, in Credit and Mounts of Piety between the Middle Ages and the Modern Age: A Historiographical Assessment] (in Italian). Bologna: Il Mulino.
- Zavaglio, Angelo (1992). I monasteri cremaschi di regola benedettina [Cremasque monasteries of Benedictine rule] (in Italian). Crema: Leva artigrafiche.
