= Mostaccino =

Spicy biscuit made in Crema, Italy

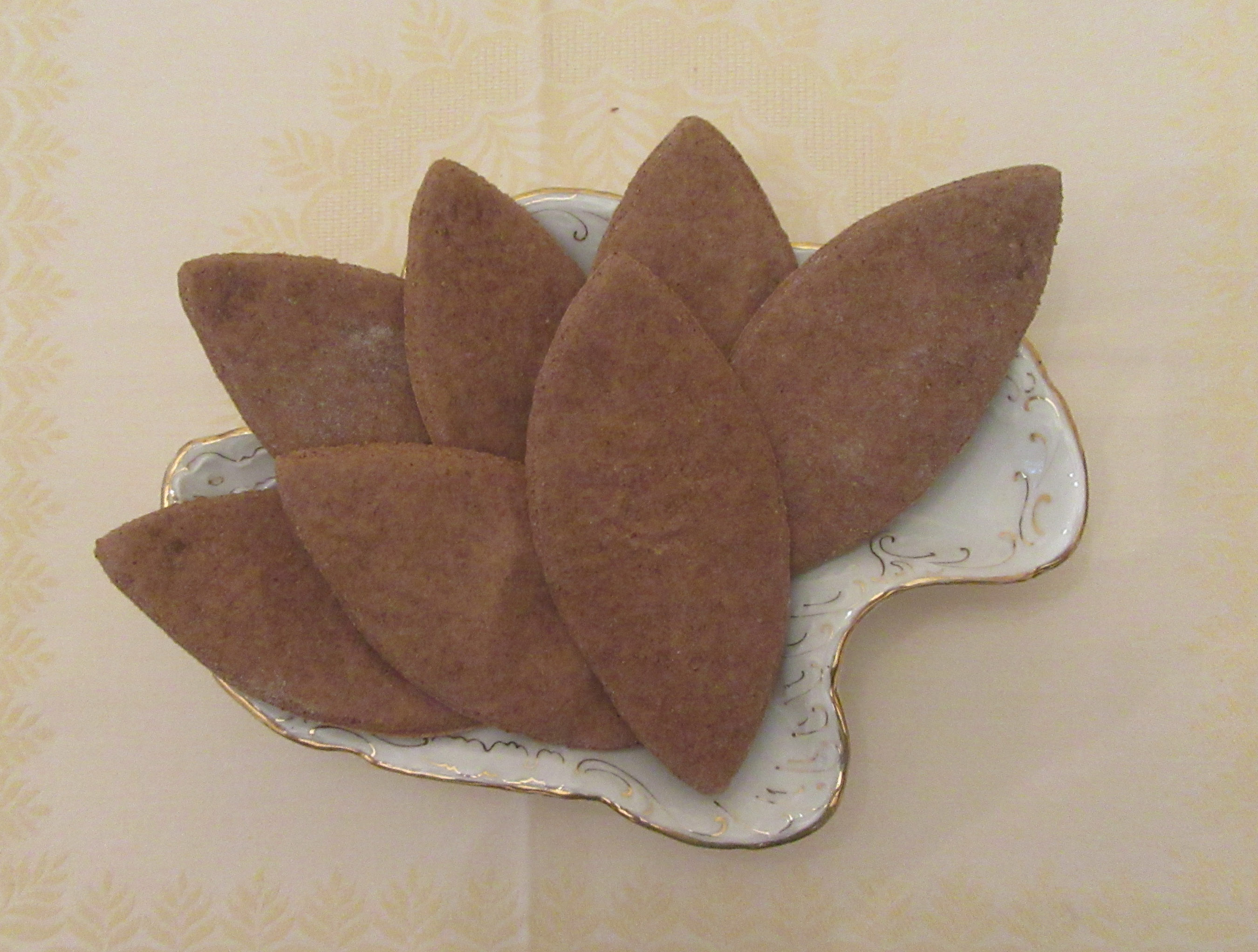
- Type: Biscuit
- Place of origin: Italy
- Region or state: Crema, Lombardy
- Main ingredients: Nutmeg, cinnamon, clove, mace, coriander, star anise, black pepper, cocoa

Mostaccino (Lombard: moustasì) is a spicy biscuit typical of the comune (municipality) of Crema, in the Lombardy region of Italy. Mainly used in the preparation of the filling of tortelli cremaschi, it includes nutmeg, cinnamon, cloves, mace, cilantro, star anise, black pepper, and cocoa among the ingredients. It has a spicy flavour.

== History ==
Mostaccino was already known in seventeenth-century cuisine. Once widespread throughout Lombardy, it is now only found in the comune of Crema and its surroundings.

== See also ==
- Lombard cuisine
- List of Italian desserts and pastries

== Bibliography ==
- Naponi, Alberto (2014). La poesia è un risotto all'acciuga. Il mio viaggio nelle meraviglie della cucina e della vita. RCS MediaGroup. ISBN 978-88-586-7327-0.
- De Cesare, Vinvenzo (2007). Tradizione alimentare e territorio: l'esempio del cremasco. University of Milan, graduation these.
