= Cesare Alpini =

Italian art historian (born 1956)

Cesare Alpini (born 9 May 1956) is an Italian art historian. Born in Crema, Lombardy, he specialises in art from that city and Lombardy more widely. He is most notable for his contributions to scholarship by Giovanni Battista Lucini (on whom he is considered the main expert) and Gian Giacomo Barbelli. He has collaborated on several art exhibitions held in Crema, including Pittura sacra a Crema dal '400 al '700 (1992), L'estro e la realtà (1997), Officina Veneziana (2002) and Luigi Manini (2007).

== Works (in Italian) ==
=== Monographs ===
- Giovan Battista Lucini: 1639-1686, Crema, 1987.
- La Basilica di Santa Maria della Croce a Crema, Silvana editoriale, 1990.
- Giovanni da Monte. Un pittore da Crema all'Europa, Bolis, 1996.
- with Goffredo Colombani e Chiara Coppa, Carlo Casanova. L'ultimo dei romantici, Ed. d'arte Severgnini, 2004.

=== Essays in collections ===
- 'Il Settecento di terraferma', in Federico Zeri (editor), Pinacoteca di Brera. Scuola veneta, Electa, 1990.
- 'I pittori e le botteghe artistiche in Crema nei secoli del Dominio Veneziano', in Filippo Pedrocco and Fabrizio Magani (editors), Officina veneziana. Maestri e botteghe nella Venezia del Settecento, Skira, 2002, ISBN 88-8491-220-2.
- Gaia Piccarolo and Giuliana Ricci (editors), Luigi Manini (1848-1936), Skira, 2007, ISBN 97888-3660888-1.
