= Crema, Lombardy =

Crema Crèma (Lombard)
- Comune
- Città di Crema
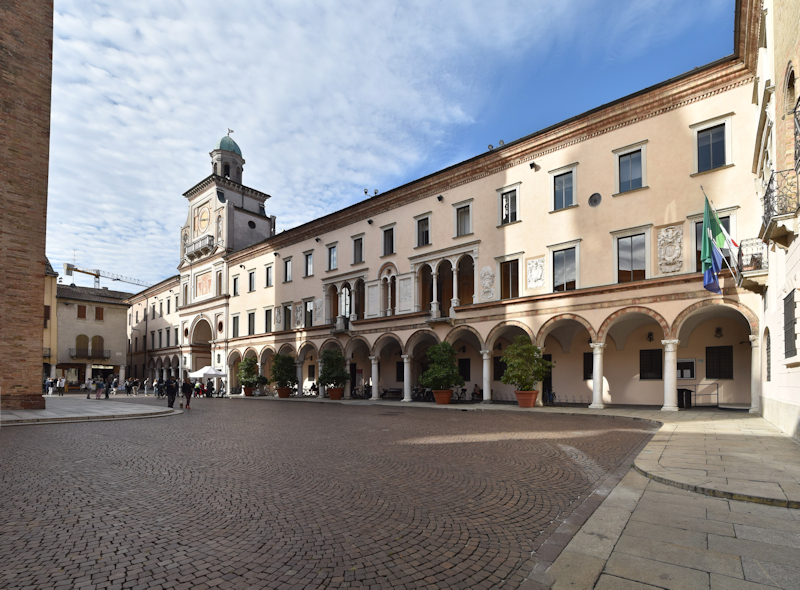
- Town Hall in Piazza Duomo

- Flag Coat of arms

- Location within Italy Location within Lombardy
- Coordinates: 45°21′48″N 9°41′13″E
- Country: Italy
- Region: Lombardy
- Province: Cremona (CR)
- Frazioni: Santa Maria dei Mosi, Santo Stefano in Vairano, Vergonzana

Government
  - Mayor: Fabio Bergamaschi (PD)

Area
  - Total: 34 km^{2} (13 sq mi)
- Elevation: 79 m (259 ft)

Population (31 December 2017)
  - Total: 34,264
  - Density: 1,000/km^{2} (2,600/sq mi)
- Demonym: Cremaschi
- Time zone: UTC+1 (CET)
  - Summer (DST): UTC+2 (CEST)
- Postal code: 26013
- Dialing code: 0373
- Patron saint: Saint Pantaleo
- Saint day: 10 June
- Website: Official website

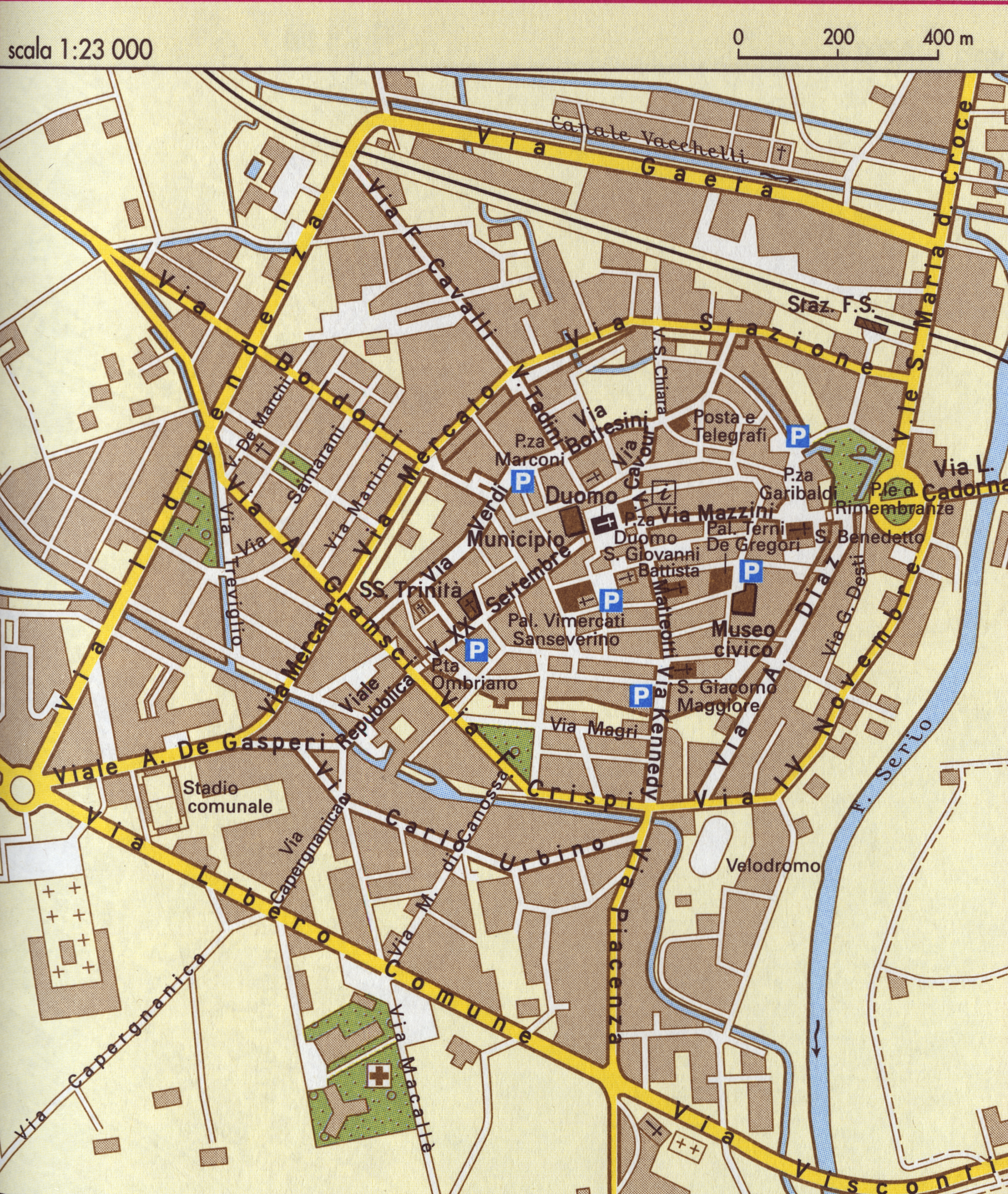
Map of Crema

Crema (Italian: [ˈkrɛːma]; Cremish Lombard: Crèma) is a city and comune (municipality) in the province of Cremona, in the region of Lombardy in northern Italy. It is built along the river Serio at 43 km (27 mi) from Cremona. It is also the seat of the Catholic Bishop of Crema, who gave the title of city to Crema.

Crema's main economic activities traditionally (since the 11th century) related to agriculture, cattle breeding and making wool, but its manufactures in later centuries include cheese, iron products and cotton and wool textiles.

== History ==
Crema's origins have been linked to the Lombard invasion of the 6th century CE, the name allegedly deriving from the Lombard term Krem meaning "little hill", though this is doubtful since it does not lie significantly above the surrounding countryside. Other linguistic roots may suggest an older origin, in particular the Indo-European root meaning a boundary (cf. Ukraine, crêt). Other authorities trace its foundation back to the 4th century CE, when Milan was capital of the Western Roman Empire. According to another version, it was instead an even more ancient Celtic or Etruscan settlement. Crema first appears in historical documents in the 11th century as a possession of the counts of Camisano. It was then ruled by Boniface, margrave of Tuscany, and his daughter Matilde. In 1098, Matilde gave the town as a gift to the Bishop of Cremona. During this period the prosperity of Crema's territory began as agriculture was boosted and the Humiliates' Order introduced the processing of wool, which was to be the area's main economic activity until the 19th century.

In 1159, after it had signed an alliance with Milan against the Ghibelline Cremona, Crema was besieged, stormed and destroyed by the Emperor Frederick Barbarossa. The siege of Crema was marked by several episodes of brutality. The Germans hung some Cremaschi prisoners to their siege machines hoping the defenders would not fire against their fellows. However, this expedient did not work, and turned the battle into a slaughter.

After the Peace of Constance (1183) the city was allowed to be rebuilt as a castrum ("castle"). Henry VI gave it back to his allied Cremonese. A period as a free Commune followed, during which, however, the tendency to partisan struggles, typical of the northern Italian communes of that age, soon showed. In any case, the city was reinforced with new walls, ditches and gates (1199), and a network of canals further improved agriculture. In the 13th century Crema was also enriched with its famous cathedral and the Palazzo Pretorio.

The communal independence ended in 1335, when the city surrendered to Gian Galeazzo Visconti, whose family held the city until the end of the century. In 1361 Crema was touched by the Black Death. A brief period of rule by the Guelph Benzoni family followed (Bartolomeo and Paolo from 1403 to 1405, then their nephew Giorgio until 1423). The seignory passed again to the Visconti, and, from 1449 onwards, to the Republic of Venice.

As a Venetian inland province, Crema obtained numerous privileges and was safe from the economic decline of the nearby Duchy of Milan under Spanish rule. It maintained a substantial level of autonomy, which allowed for a program of new buildings. These included a new line of walls, the rebuilding of the Palazzo Comunale (1525–1533), the Palazzo della Notaria, now Palazzo Vescovile.

The 17th century saw the beginning of the decadence of the city, caused by the decline of its industrial activities, although agriculture continued to flourish. In 1796 an Academy of Agriculture was founded. After the fall of the Republic of Venice in 1797, Crema became part of the new French client Cisalpine republic (and later the Napoleonic Italian Republic and Kingdom of Italy). The French army deposed the last podestà and created a municipality. At first Crema formed part of the province of Crema-Lodi, but was later annexed to the department of Alto Po centred on Cremona. After the Napoleonic wars the Congress of Vienna awarded Crema to Austria as part of the Kingdom of Lombardy–Venetia. Within Lombardy–Venetia it became part of the Province of Lodi–Crema within the sub-Kingdom of Lombardy.

By the 1859 Treaty of Zurich which ended the Austro-Sardinian War, Austria ceded Lombardy, including Crema, to France, who then immediately ceded it to Sardinia. This formed part of the Risorgimento, which saw Sardinia become the Kingdom of Italy in 1861. In 1946, the Kingdom became the modern Italian Republic.

== Main sights ==
Crema's most famous historical sights are:

- Cathedral, in Lombard-Gothic style, with a tall bell-tower completed in 1604;
- Civic museum;
- Church of Santa Maria della Croce (St. Mary of the Cross), built in 1493–1500 by Giovanni Battagio;
- Palazzo Comunale (Town Hall);
- Palazzo Pretorio, with the annexed medieval tower;
- Palazzo Vescovile;
- Palazzo Benvenuti Arrigoni Albergoni;
- Santissima Trinità church.
- Church of Santa Maria delle Grazie
- Episcopal Seminary of Crema

Many other sights, such as minor churches and private palaces, are dislocated through the city center.

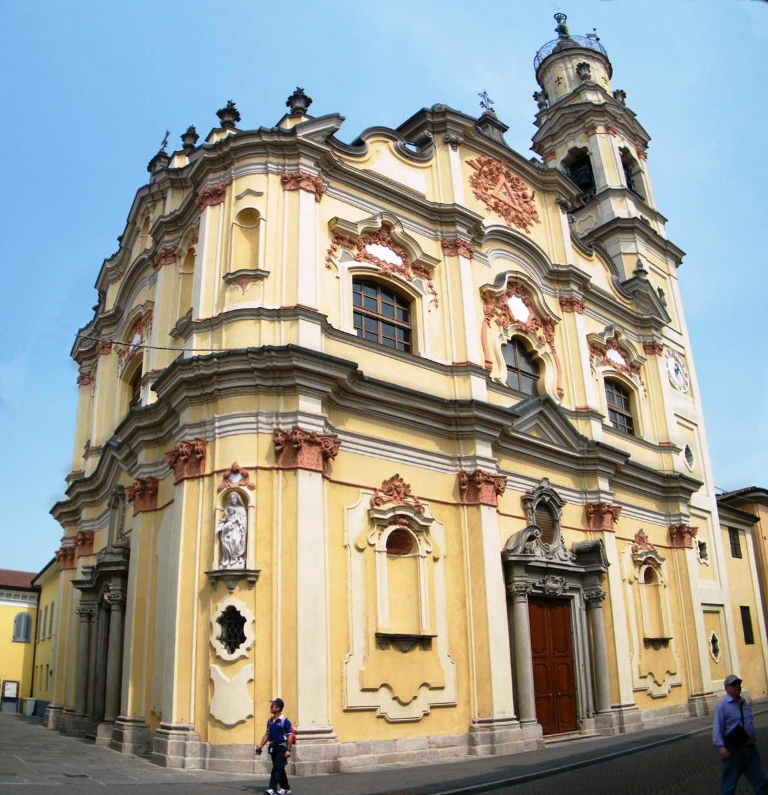
Santissima Trinità church

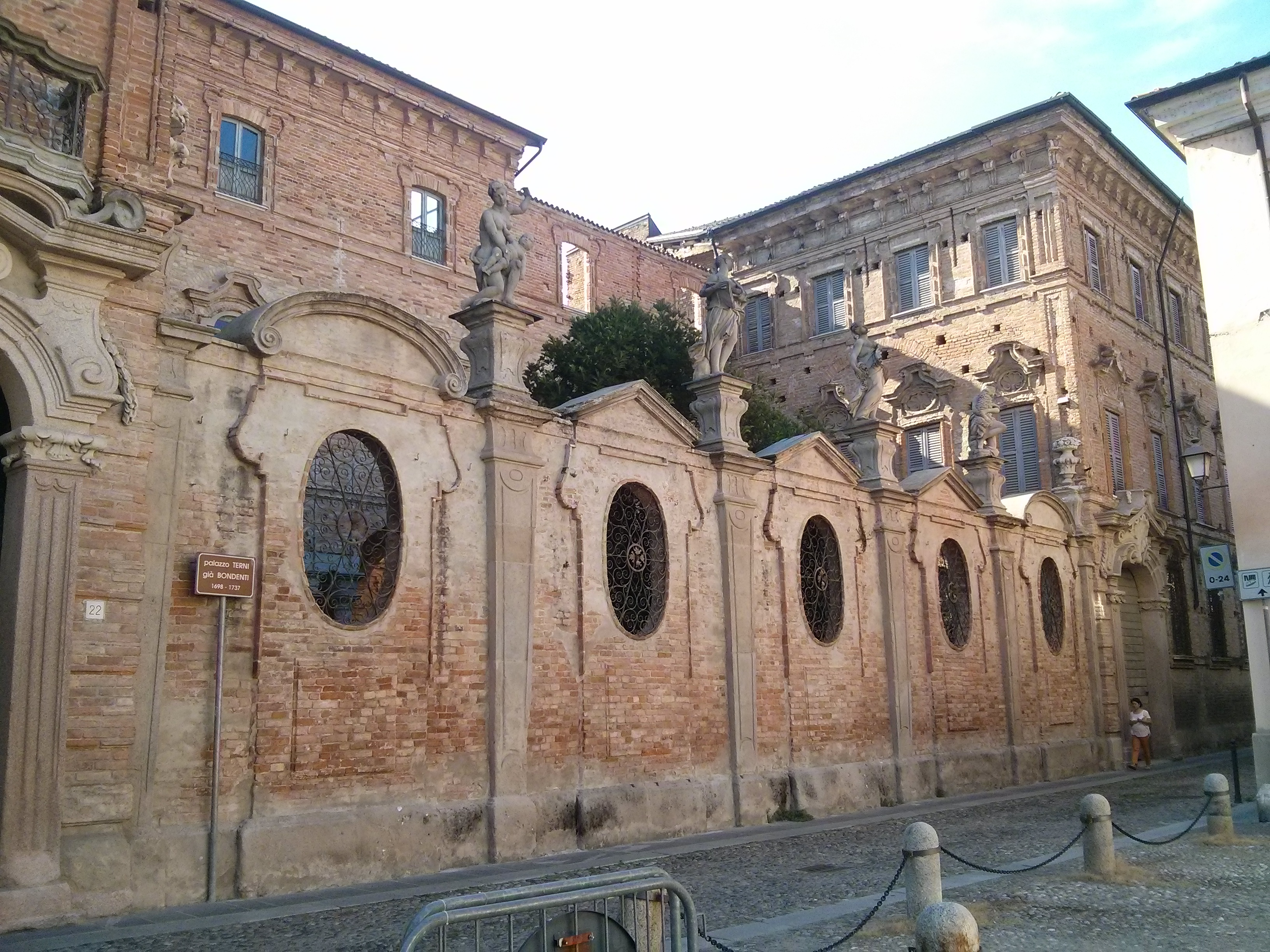
Palazzo Terni Gregori

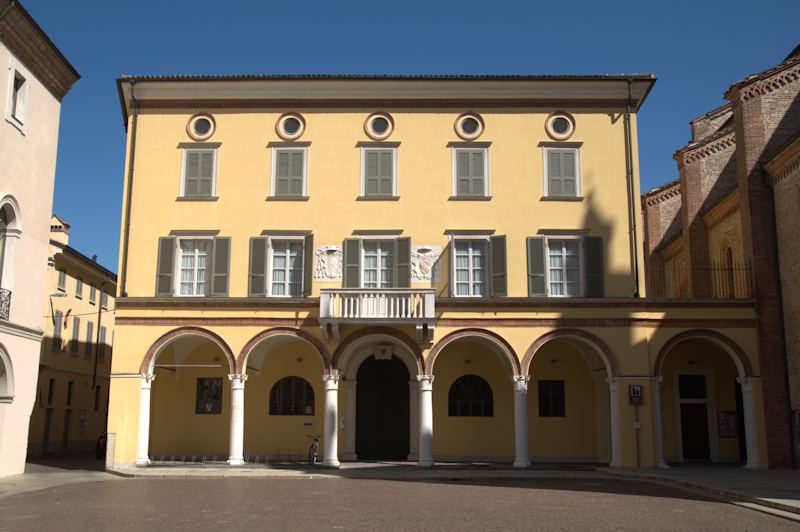
Palazzo Vescovile, official residence of the bishop

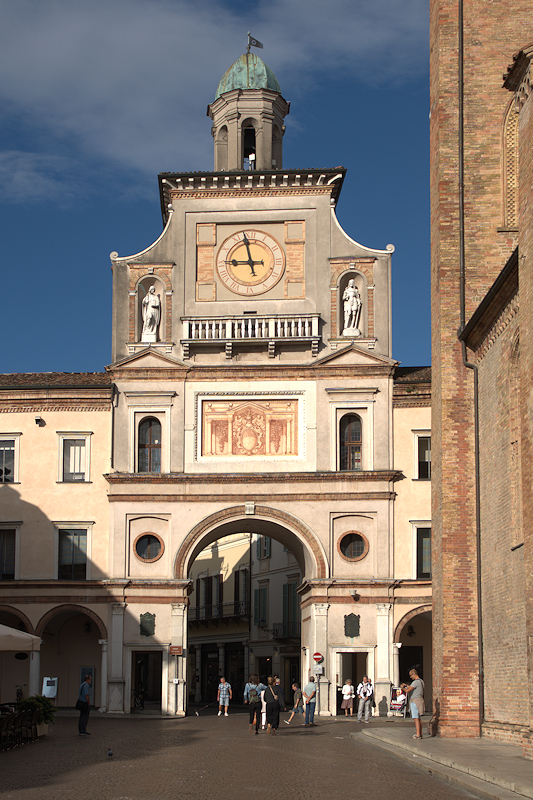
Torrazzo

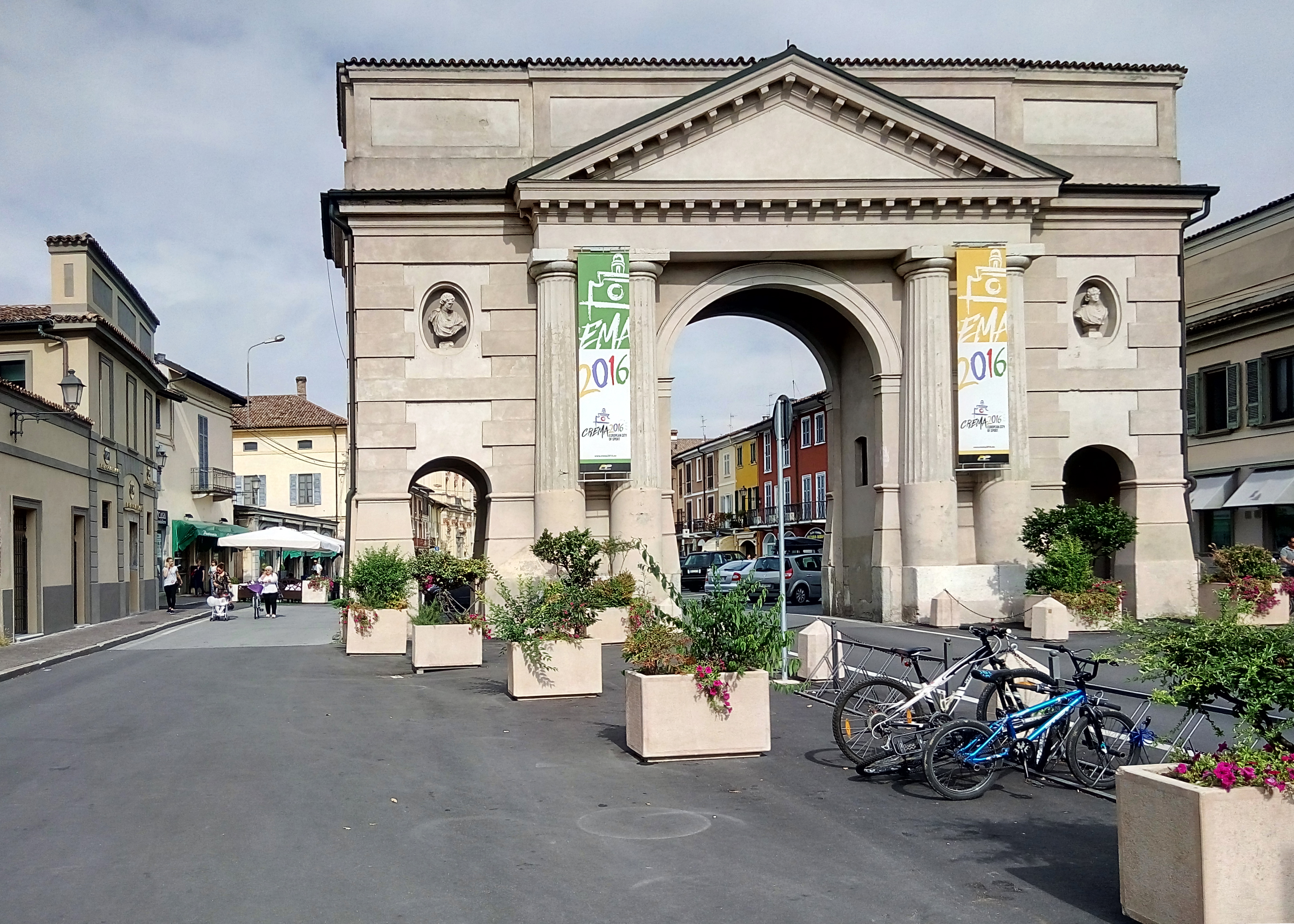
Porta Ombriano, western city gate

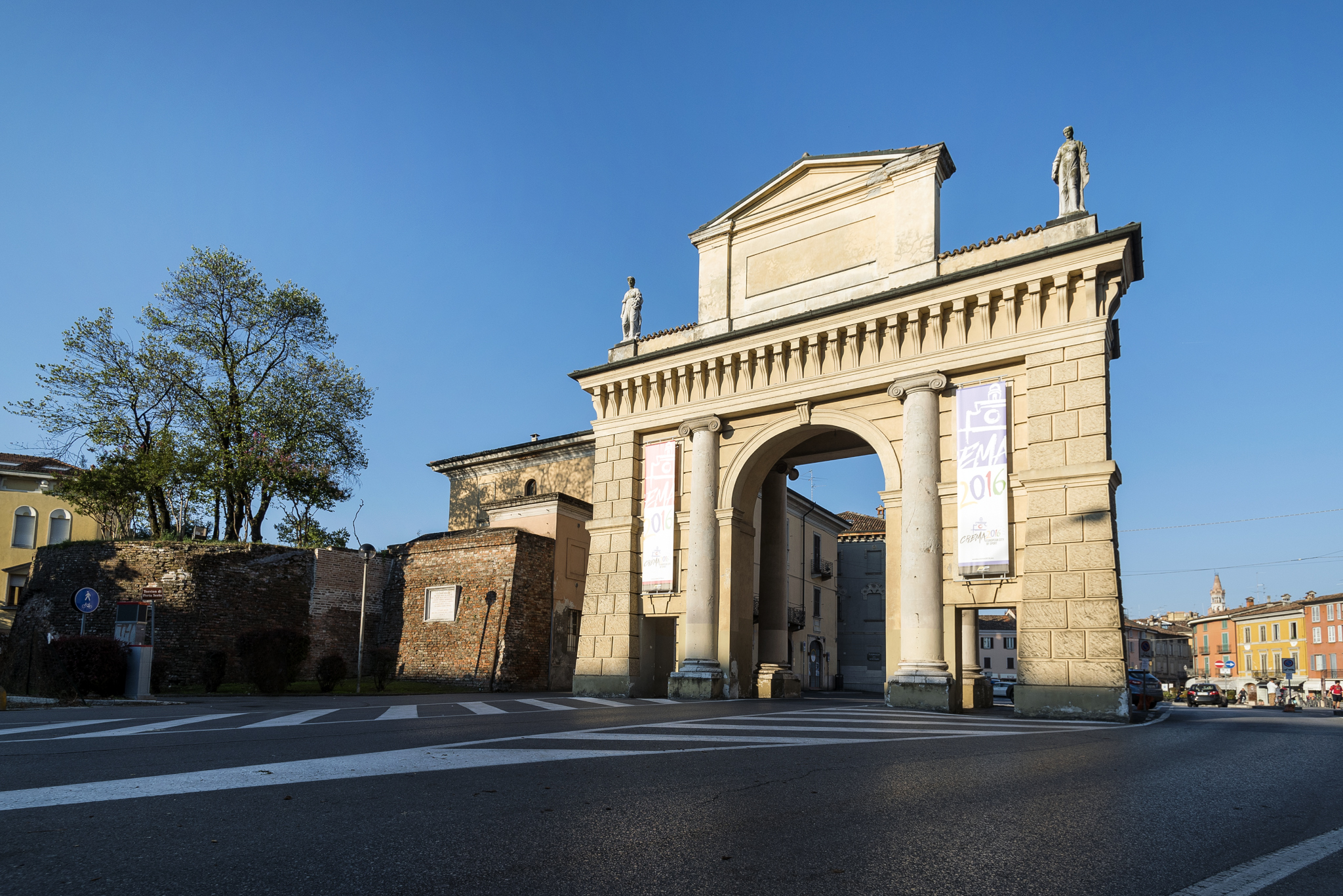
Porta Serio, eastern city gate

== Culture ==
=== Civic Museum of Crema ===
The Civic Museum of Crema, established in the 1960, is located in the Renaissance convent of Sant 'Agostino.

=== Cuisine ===
The tortelli cremaschi (dialect of Crema: turtèi cremasch) represents the main dish of the local culinary tradition. This is a kind of tortelli that doesn't exist elsewhere in Italy as the filling is sweet, consisting of parmesan cheese, Amaretti di Saronno (an Italian almond biscuit), raisins, candied citron, spices and the mostaccino (a typical spiced biscuit).

Also worth mentioning is the salva, a DOP cheese typical of the Crema area, traditionally consumed with tighe (green Lombard pepper), packaged in vinegar.

Poor dish typically consumed in winter, accompanied by cotechino (gelatinous pork sausage in a natural casing) or boiled meat, is pipèto (flan of cabbage, butter, garlic, parmesan, nutmeg).

The main sweets of the city are the treccia d'oro, the Bertolina cake (Bertulina), a popular autumn cake made with red grapes, to which a square festival is also dedicated, and the noblest Spongarda, consumed throughout the year.

Moreover, in time of Carnival, chisulì are prepared, balls filled with a mixture prepared with lemon peel, brewer's yeast, raisins, apple and lard.

== Sport ==
AC Crema 1908 is the local football club and play at the Giuseppe Voltini Stadium. The club took part to two Serie B seasons immediately after the second World War, led by world champion Renato Olmi.

== People ==
- Francesco Cavalli (1602-1676), composer
- Giovanni Giacomo Barbelli (1604–1656), painter
- Lodovico Benvenuti (1899–1966), politician
- Giovanni Bottesini (1821–1889), composer
- Luca Guadagnino (b. 1971), film director, lives in Crema (his movie, Call Me by Your Name, was filmed here in 2016)
- Giovanni Battista Lucini (1639–1686), painter
- Carlo Martini (1908–1958), painter
- Giuseppe Doldi (b. 1950), footballer
- Beppe Severgnini (b. 1956), writer and journalist
- Giovanni Vailati (1815–1890), classical mandolinist
- Cesare Alpini (b. 1956), art historian
- Giovanni Cesare Pagazzi (b. 1965), archbishop
- Jader Bignamini (b. 1976), conductor
- Andrea Marcolongo (b. 17 January 1987), writer

== Transport ==
Crema is served by a railway station on the Treviglio–Cremona railway, with regional trains.

There were three national roads connecting the city: SS 415 to Milan and Cremona; SS 591 to Piacenza and Bergamo; and SS 235 to Brescia and Pavia. The nearest motorway exits are the one of Lodi-Pieve Fissiraga, on the Autostrada A1 and the one of Romano di Lombardia on the Autostrada A35 - BreBeMi, opened in July 2014.

== In popular culture ==
The film Call Me by Your Name (2017) was shot primarily in Crema. Several historical locations in the surrounding streets in Crema and Pandino were chosen during production, including the Crema Cathedral.

== Administration ==
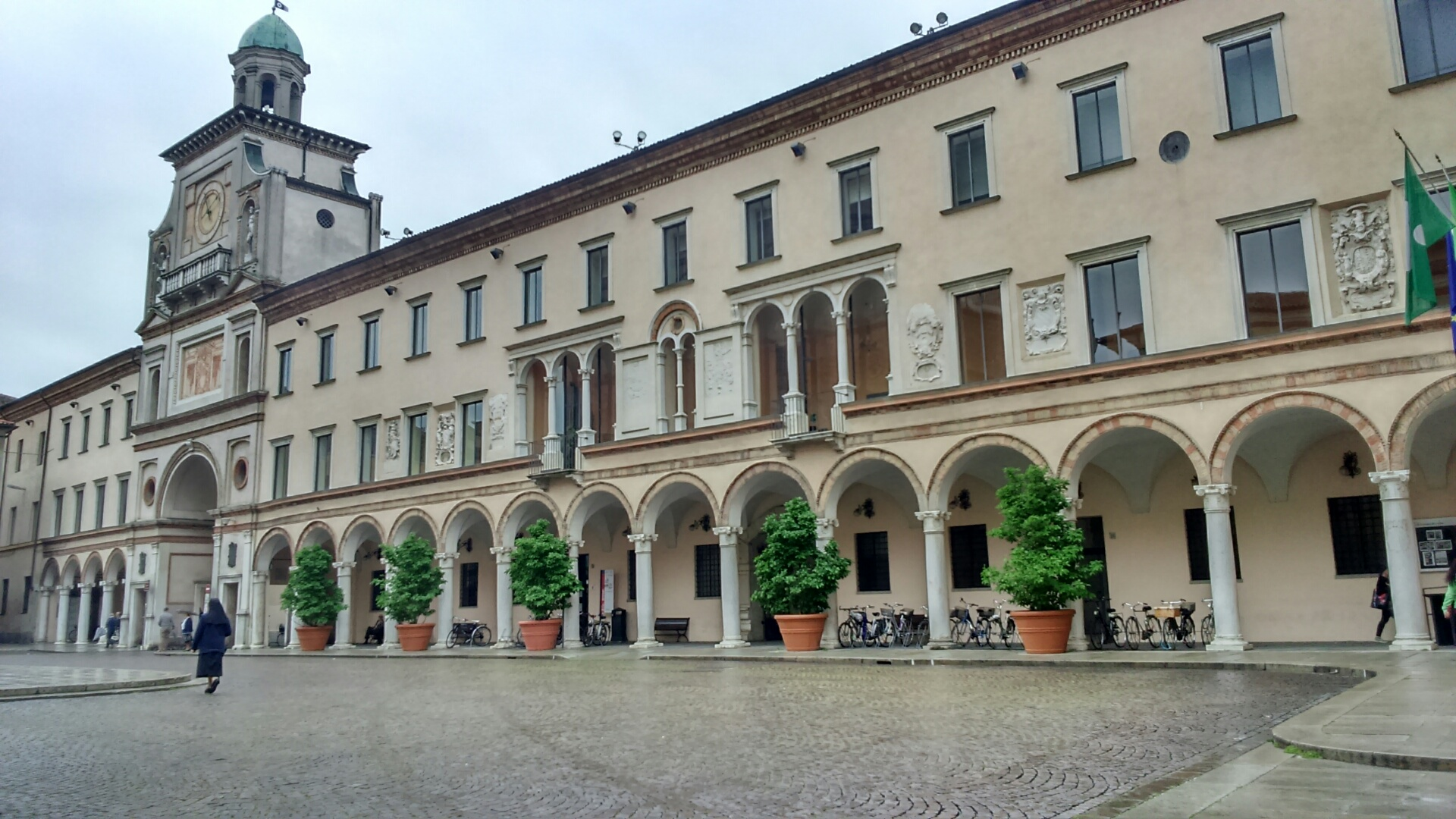
The Town Hall of Crema.

Since local government political reorganization in 1993, Crema has been governed by the City Council of Crema. Voters elect directly the councilors and the mayor of Crema every five years.

The current mayor of Crema is Fabio Bergamaschi (PD), elected on 26 June 2022 with 58% of votes.

This is a list of the mayors of Crema since 1993:

Mayor	Term start	Term end	Party
Cesare Giovinetti	6 December 1993	1 December 1997	LN
Claudio Ceravolo	1 December 1997	28 May 2007	DS
Bruno Bruttomesso	28 May 2007	21 May 2012	LN
Stefania Bonaldi	21 May 2012	27 June 2022	PD
Fabio Bergamaschi	27 June 2022	Incumbent	PD

== Sister cities ==
- Melun, France, since 2001
- Nanning, China, since 2015

== See also ==
- Venetian walls of Crema
- Palace of the Mount of Piety
- Church of Saint Bernardino of Siena (Crema)
- Major Hospital of Crema
- San Bernardino (Crema)

== Bibliography ==
- Rino Cammilleri, Tutti i giorni con Maria, calendario delle apparizioni, Milano, Ares, 2020, ISBN 978-88-815-59-367.
