= Santo Stefano in Vairano =

Coordinates: 45°22′46″N 09°40′35″E

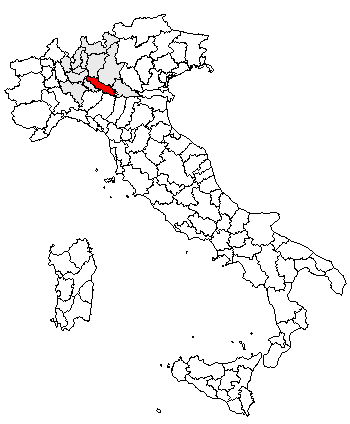
Location of the province of Cremona

Santo Stefano in Vairano is a frazione in Crema, Italy. Located north of the city, along the provincial road to Caravaggio, the railroad runs along it, parallel to the Vacchelli canal. Santo Stefano has approximately 800 inhabitants. Its only monument is its church, which is decorated with valuable frescos.

Santo Stefano is surrounded by fallow fields and ears of corn as far as the eye can see, interspersed with irrigation canals called rogge and rows of trees, typical of the valley.

== History ==
Already a comune in the 9th century, it bore the name Vairano. Although the frazione was born out of a monastery long gone, the main area of Santo Stefano is still called Vairano.

Santo Stefano has its own newspaper called Il Paese, which publishes local news on a monthly basis.
