= Siege of Crema =

Medieval siege in Italy

- Part of Guelphs and Ghibellines
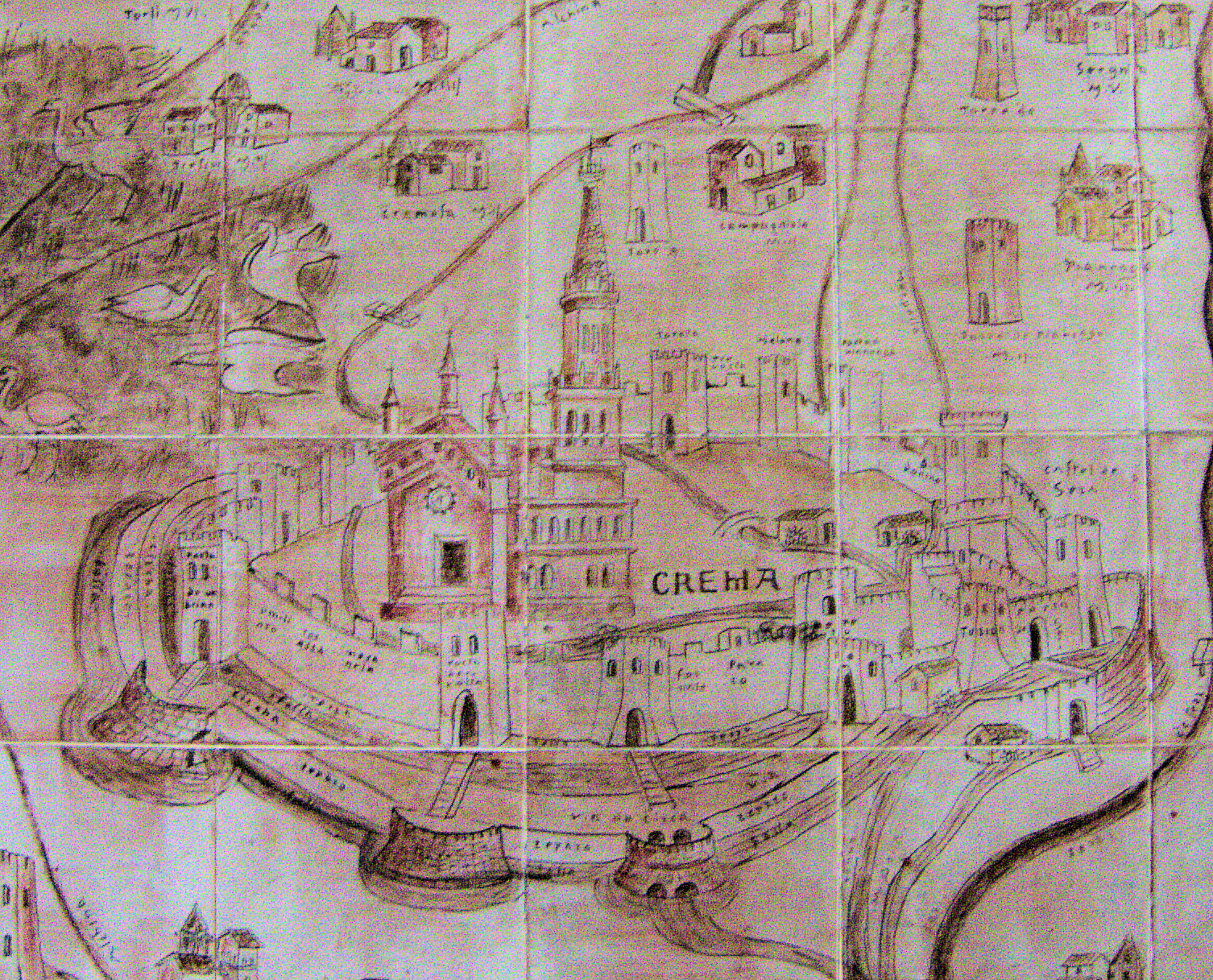
- The Comune of Crema (15th century)
| Date | 2 July 1159 – 25 January 1160 (6 months, 3 weeks and 2 days) |
| Location | Crema, Lombardy |
| Result | Imperial victory |

Belligerents
| Holy Roman Empire; Commune of Cremona; Commune of Pavia | Comune of Crema |

Commanders and leaders
| Frederick Barbarossa; Henry the Lion | |

Strength
| 15,000: 5,000 cavalry; 10,000 infantry | 9 mangonels |

Casualties and losses
| Heavy | City burned to the ground |

The siege of Crema was a siege of the town of Crema, Lombardy by the Holy Roman Empire from 2 July 1159 to 25 January 1160. The Cremaschi attempted to defend their city from the Germans, but were eventually defeated by Frederick Barbarossa's men. Frederick seized Milan in 1162, shortly after he took Crema. These events started the wars of Guelphs and Ghibellines, leading to the formation of the Lombard League, a league of northern Italian communes allied against the emperor, supported by the Pope.

== Background ==
In 1158, Frederick Barbarossa led an army into northern Italy to reduce the autonomy of its communes. The main imperial ally, Cremona, was at the time quarreling with the nearby Crema about rights and privileges namely owed to the bishops of Cremona. Crema was also allied to Milan, and this was seen as a menace of extension of the Milanese power towards Cremona and the Po River. In a meeting held at Casale Monferrato, the Cremonesi convinced Frederick to attack Crema, an act that would also imply a menace against the rebellious Milan. The Cremonese also paid 15,000 silver corone to Frederick in exchange of his help.

== Siege ==
After an ultimatum sent by Frederick on 2 February 1159, asking the destruction of their walls, was refused, the Cremaschi settled into their city to hold against a siege. Barbarossa killed his prisoners, so the Cremaschi hacked their prisoners to pieces in front of their comrades.

The besieging troops were formed mostly by Barbarossa's imperial contingents, part of which led by his brother, Conrad, and by the latter's son Frederick; by Bavarian troops under duke Henry the Lion; and by communal troops, mostly belonging to the main imperial allies, Cremona (under bishop Oberto of Dovara) and Pavia. The city was on a marshy plain and was protected by several moats and a tall double wall. The defenders had nine mangonels as defensive artillery. Milan attempted to save Crema by assaulting a nearby town, but Barbarossa drove back the Milanese.

The besiegers set in their final positions in the October 1159; starting from the following December, they used a "cat" (a mobile roof), followed by a siege tower, to cover their siege engineers who were mining under the walls. This led to the Cremaschi also digging tunnels to start underground warfare. After the cat had eroded the walls, a ram was used to create a breach in the walls; the tower was further neared to the walls starting from 6 January. The final assault was launched on January 21 using a mobile bridge measuring some 24 x 3.5 meters, while a smaller one was launched from the siege tower.

The defenders and civilians, some of whom had died of hunger and disease, surrendered on January 25 after the imperial troops had taken control of the outer walls. Some 20,000 survivors were allowed to leave with whatever they could carry before Crema was looted and burnt to the ground. An edict issued by Frederick in 1162 at Lodi officially forbade its reconstruction.

Milan was also taken and destroyed two years later, ending the first phase of the war. Crema could be rebuilt by its citizens after the signature of the Peace of Constance in 1183.

== See also ==
- Venetian walls of Crema

== Bibliography ==
- Bradbury, Jim (1992). The Medieval Siege. Woodbridge, Suffolk: Boydell Press. ISBN 978-0851153575.
- France, John (1999). Western Warfare in the Age of the Crusades: 1000-1300. Ithaca, New York: Cornell University Press. ISBN 0-8014-3671-0.
- Piastrella, Carlo (29 May 2009). "L'assedio di Crema". InPrimapagina.
