= Tortelli cremaschi =

Main dish of traditional Cremasque cuisine

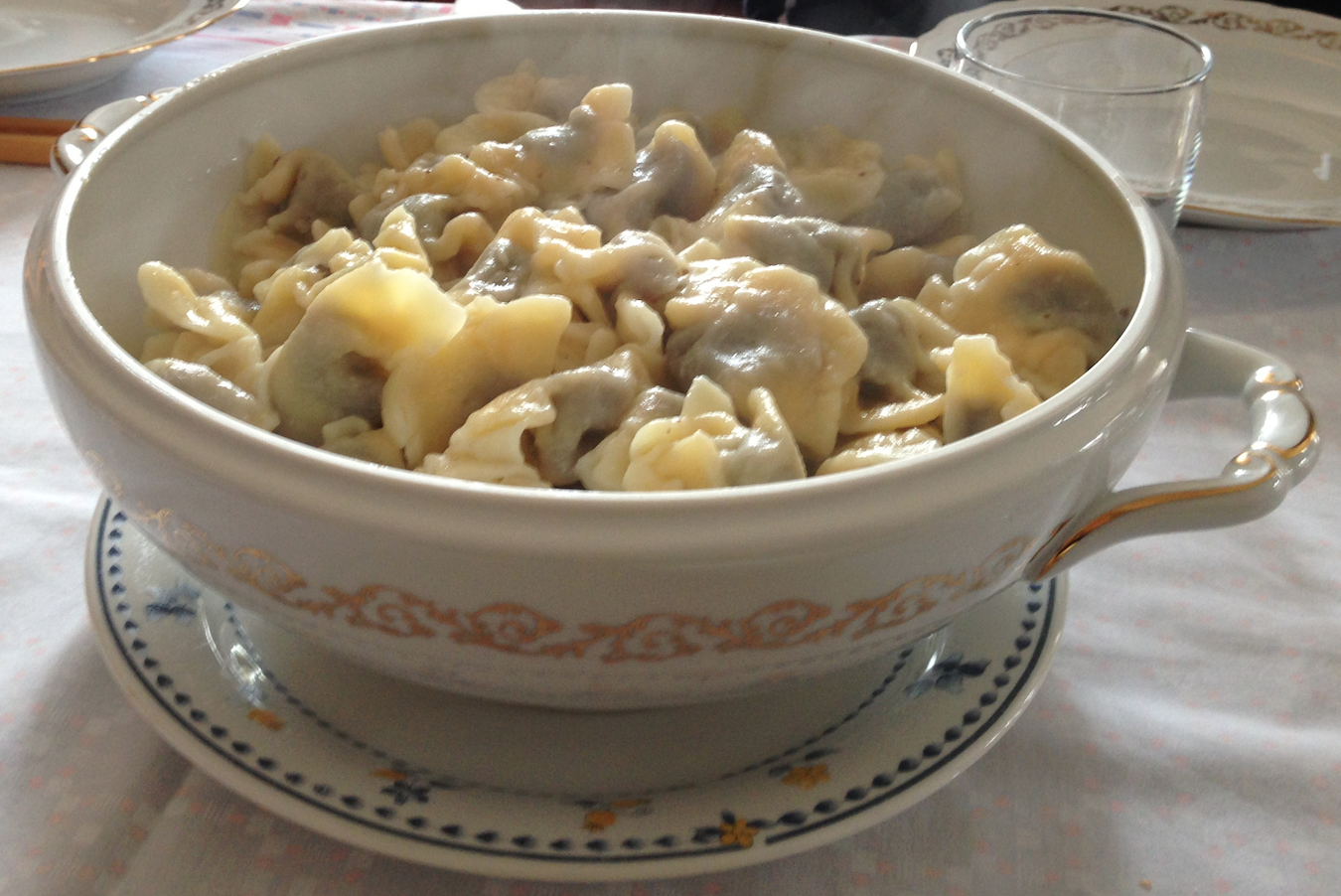
- Course: Primo (Italian course)
- Place of origin: Italy
- Region or state: Lombardy
- Invented: Years of the Republic of Venice

Tortelli cremaschi (dialect of Crema: turtèi cremasch) represents the main dish of the local Cremasque culinary tradition. While tortelli typically have a savoury filling, that of tortelli cremaschi is sweet and cannot be found elsewhere in Italy.

== See also ==
- List of pasta
- List of pasta dishes

== Bibliography ==
- Daniela Bianchessi and Roberta Schira, Mangià Nustrà, Grafin, s.d., ISBN not found.
- Francesco Piantelli, Folclore Cremasco, 2nd edition Arti Grafiche Cremasche, Crema. 1985, Crema, Publishing House Vinci, 1951.
