= Venetian walls of Crema =

Defensive walls built during the Venetian domination in Crema, Italy

- Crema, Lombardy in Italy
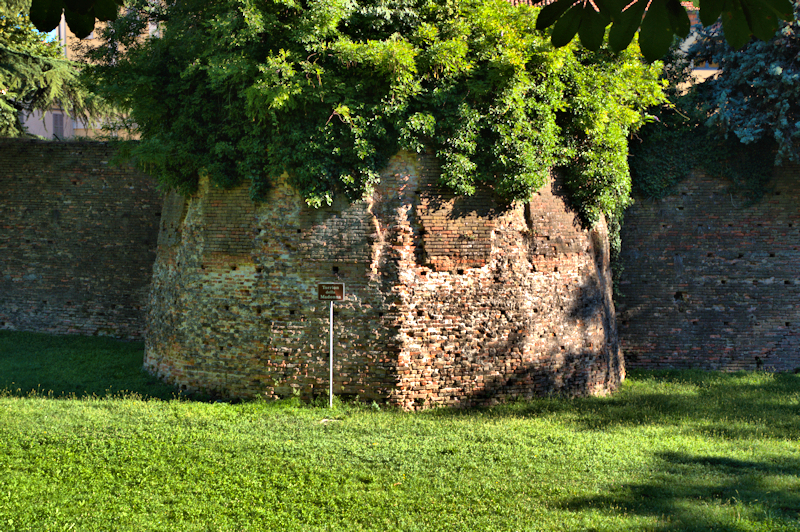
- The Torrion della Madonna at the public gardens of Campo di Marte

Site information
- Owner: Public property

Location
- Location within Northern Italy
- Coordinates: 45°21′48.19″N 9°41′1.37″E

Site history
- Built: 1488-1509
- Architect: Giovanantonio De Marchi and Venturino Moroni
- Materials: Brick
- Battles/wars: Siege of 1514

The Venetian walls of Crema are an architectural construction dating back to the second half of the 15th century, built for defensive purposes.

== History ==
=== Medieval walls ===
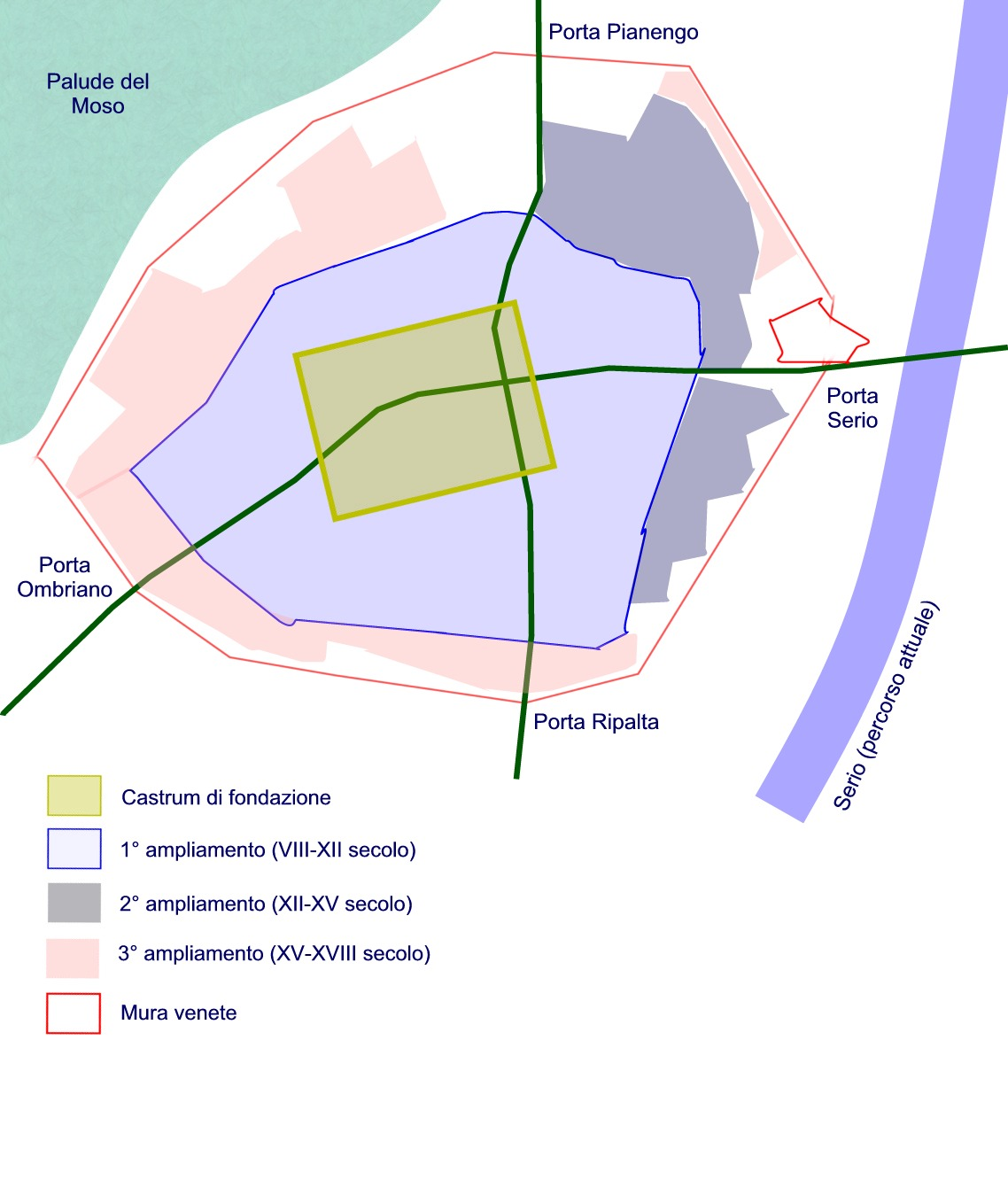
Probable urban evolution of Crema

The origins of the city of Crema are shrouded in mystery. Fulcheria Island appears for the first time in a document of 1040 when the bishop of Cremona Ubaldo asked Emperor Henry III the Black to entrust him with that territory, until then a fief of Boniface III.

In addition, it is known of a diploma through which in 1055 Henry III granted the districtum de Insula Fulcherii in perpetual investiture to the church of Cremona.

The Island once again became a feud of the marquises of Tuscany in 1057, specifically to Beatrice of Lorraine – second wife of Boniface, who died in 1052 – and her daughter Matilda. The latter finally granted the Island to the Church and the Municipality of Cremona in 1098.

As for the toponym Crema, it appears as locus in 1082 and as castrum in 1084. However, a certainty about the existence of Crema comes only in 1146 when the imperial legate Ermanno, bishop of Constance, sent a letter to the consuls, counts and people of Crema urging them to obey the bishop of Cremona. Moreover, in 1162 Emperor Frederick Barbarossa confirmed the investiture of the castrum Cremae con burgo to the people of Cremona, later retaining for himself the villages in the territory, a crucial piece of news since it was an indication of a settlement with a subordinate territory.

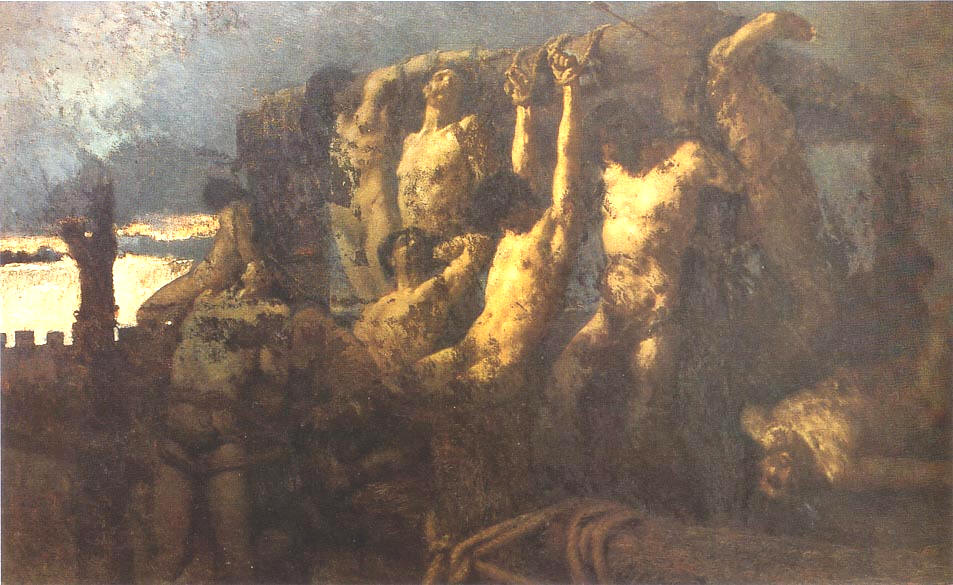
Gaetano Previati, The hostages of Crema, 1879 (Crema, Museo civico di Crema e del Cremasco)

Multiple hypotheses have been posed about the shape of Crema in the period before the siege. Historian Pietro Terni suggested that the city had been fortified since the Lombard era and for centuries had three outer suburbs.

According to Dado Edallo, the suburbs extra moenia would not predate the 11th century, although the scholar does not rule out previous early medieval urban formations of religious origin, a hypothesis that Paolo Favole refutes since churches arranged in the shape of a cross in Italy are of later date.

Finally, Carlo Piastrella hypothesizes only a partial fortification to the east, where in past centuries the toponym "Contrada del Ghirlo" was used, from "gyrus," which in medieval Latin indicated the city walls. The other sides would have been defended by ditches and embankments that would have allowed the people of Crema to cross them with ease during the siege of 1159/1160 and supply the inhabitants and refugees through passages within the Moso swamp. As for the name Castrum Cremae cum burgo mentioned in the diploma of 1162 Piastrella identifies the village as a separate military post, probably identifiable with Borgo San Pietro, which has maintained its own characteristic urban connotation over the centuries; in further support of this are also the chronicles of the siege which agree that the destructive fire set to the city by the imperial allied forces did not affect the supposed Borgo San Pietro, within which many fleeing besieged found refuge.

One certain element was the wide and deep moat, which, as the chronicler Ottone Morena testified, prevented the approach of imperial war machines, and it was only with the contribution of a large quantity of earth and under the shelter of "cats" and "tortoises" (siege engines) that the besiegers were gradually able to approach the fortifications.

=== From reconstruction to the arrival of the Venetians ===
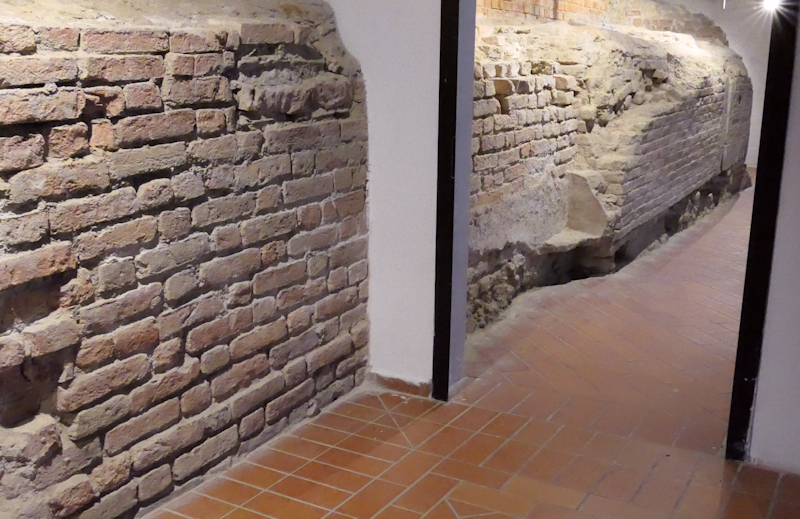
Remains of the medieval walls in the basement of the "San Luigi" Youth Center on Giovanni Bottesini Street

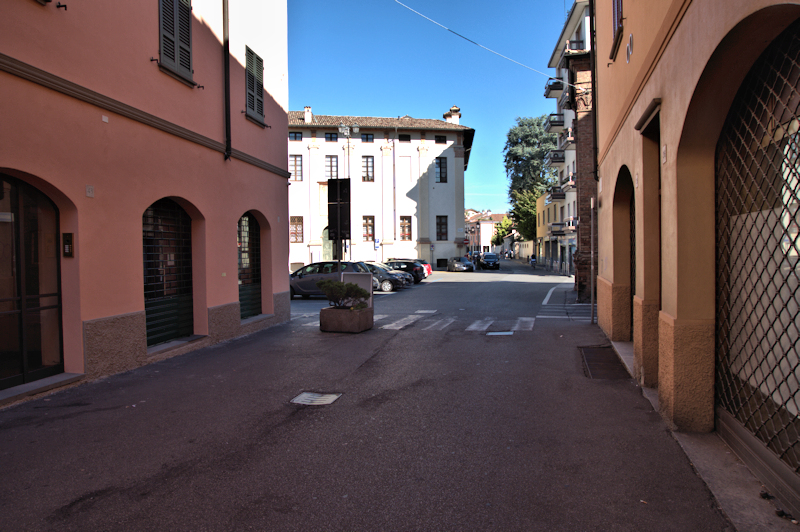
Via Ponte Furio, near the intersection with Via Giuseppe Verdi

With a diploma dated February 11, 1185, in Reggio, in the presence of the consuls of Crema Domerto Benzoni, Rogerio de Osio and Benzo Bonsignori, the rebuilding of the city was granted. According to historian Pietro Terni, after the erection of ditches and trenches to counter Cremonese skirmishes, a new city wall with 21 towers was erected between 1190 and 1199. In addition to the four gates Serio, Ombriano, Ripalta and Pianengo with their towers the enclosure counted a fifth minor gateway, the gate (or postern) of Ponfure dependent on Porta Pianengo. The toponym seems to have originated at the time of the siege, when the people of Crema during a sortie forced a group of besiegers to fall back along the walls; the tenacious resistance of one of them, named Furio, earned him perpetual memory; in fact, nowadays the Ponte Furio street that connects Via XX Settembre with Via Giuseppe Verdi still exists.

After the reconstruction, the castrum was divided into 27 vicinie (or neighborhoods) that took the names of the families of feudal and comital tradition that held the power of the commune. Again according to Terni Crema was expanded on every side except to the north. However, according to Carlo Piastrella, only moats and embankments were built.

Certain records from those centuries include the erection of the castles of Porta Serio (1335) and Porta Ombriano (1361), the latter commissioned by Bernabò Visconti and demolished by the Venetians in 1451.

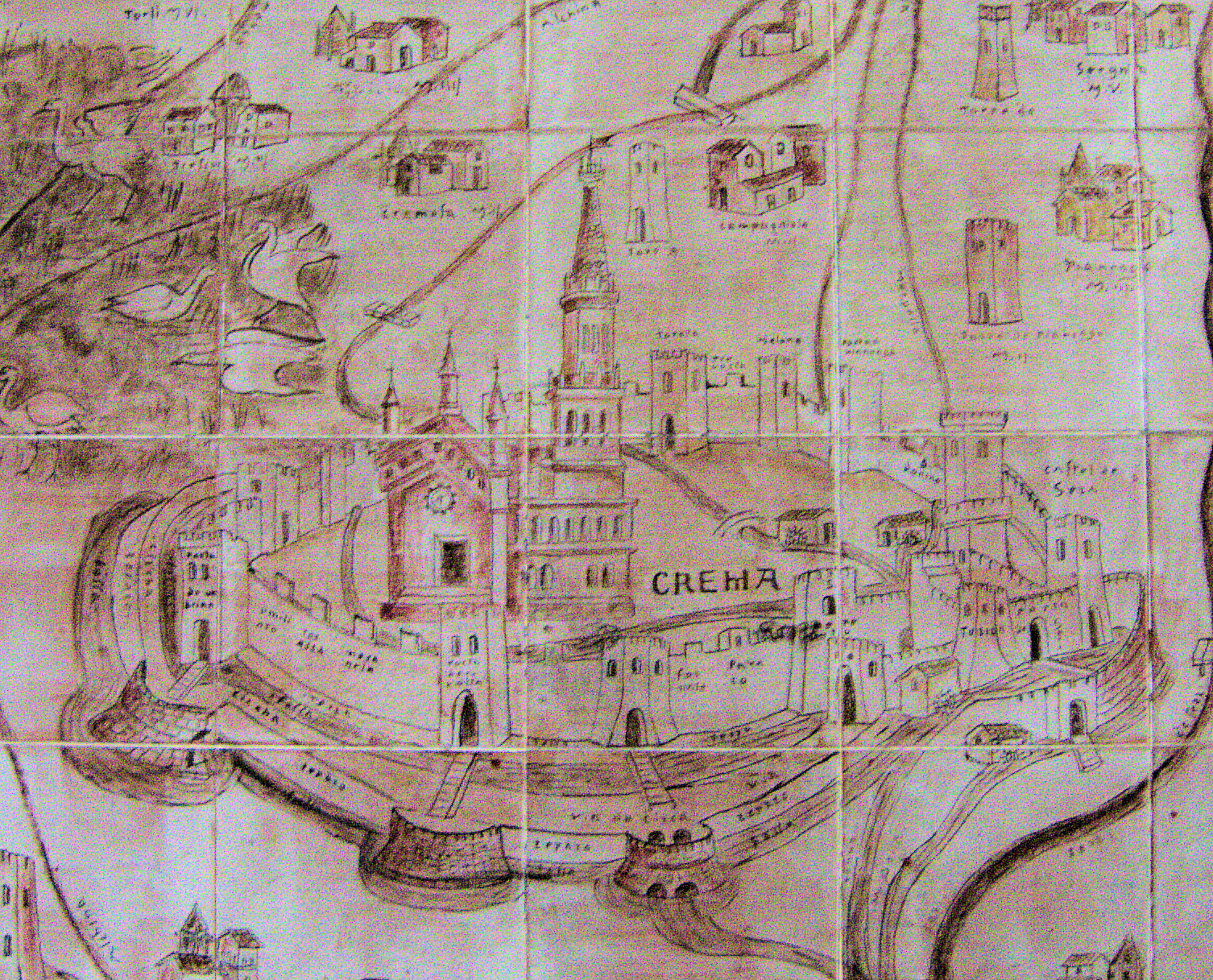
Crema in the ceramic reproduction of the oldest map of the Cremasque region, dating back to the 15th century: the original is kept at the Correr Museum in Venice

During the brief seigniory of the Benzoni family, Giorgio, who came to power in 1405, had the contado fortified with a series of watchtowers (some of which still exist, transformed or incorporated into other buildings). In the city, the cathedral bell tower served as the main observation point, where two or three guards paid by the municipality were stationed. This fortified network is well documented on the Desegnio de Crema et del Cremascho, the oldest extant map of the territory, which can also be consulted in reproduction on ceramic tiles at the Civic Museum of Crema, a work created by Gianetto Biondini in 1966.

=== Venetian walls ===
==== Construction ====
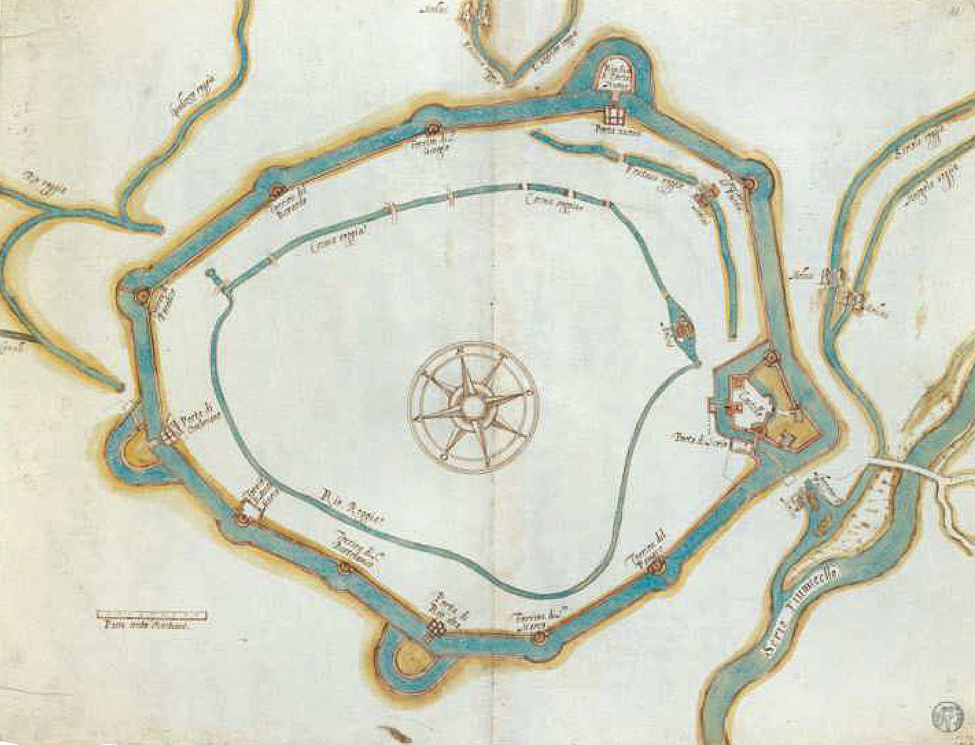
Historical map of Crema, 16th century, author unknown, drawing with pen and sepia ink, with watercolor and traces of pencil, on paper, kept in the Municipal Library of Treviso

In February 1449 a Venetian troop led by Sigismondo Pandolfo Malatesta laid siege to Crema, which capitulated the following September, starting the long rule under the Serenissima destined to last until 1797 (except for the brief French period of 1509–1512).

It fell to the Venetian podestà Berardo Barbarigo to act as ambassador to the people of Crema to convince them of the need for a new city wall: having invited the mayors to a banquet he convinced them, appealing to their pride and vanity, to take on one-third of the funding of 36,000 ducats, although he later increased the cost estimate to 120,000 ducats.

Within a solemn ceremony on May 24, 1488, work began with the rebuilding of the Ombriano Gate, and then continued until 1498, alternating the construction of the southern and northern sectors. The work continued until 1509 with the completion of the excavation of the moat and the completion of the inner embankment. No military engineers were called in to direct the work, but it was entrusted first to Giovanantonio De Marchi from Crema and then to Venturino Moroni from Bergamo.

At the conclusion of the reconstruction, the walls contemplated the four gates: of Ombriano, Pianengo (sometimes also called Porta Nova), Serio and Ripalta; in addition, the walls were divided by eight towers thus named: Torrion del Berardo, Torrion di S.to Giorgio, Torrion del Foscolo, Torrion del Paradiso, Torrion di Santa Maria, Torrion di S.to Bertolameo, Torrion del Pavaro, Torrion di S.to Marco.

==== 16th century ====
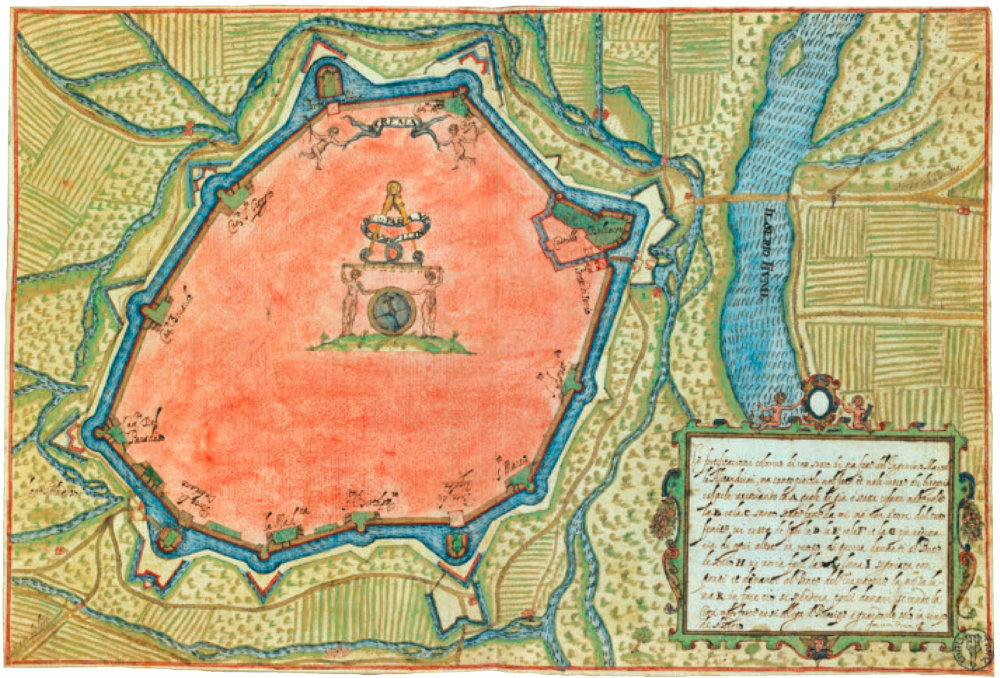
Historical map of Crema, c. 1620, by Francesco Tansini, pen and dry ink drawing, with watercolor, on paper, plan of the city walls with the new ramparts, preserved in the Municipal Library of Treviso

In 1508, confronted with fears of invasion following the stipulation of the Anti-Venetian League of Cambrai, the moats were strengthened and enlarged and the guards increased. All male citizens of Crema over the age of sixteen were called to work on reinforcing the counter-ditches. The outcome of the Battle of Agnadello (1509) resulted in the French conquest.

Three years later with the contribution of the condottiere Renzo da Ceri Crema returned to Venetian hands. Bribing the French commander Guido Pace Bernardi in return for a fee, the people of Crema willingly opened their doors to the condottiero to free themselves from an invader who enforced taxes, oppression and robbery. However, political front reversals led to a new siege in 1514 by a coalition between the Duchy of Milan, the Spanish Empire and the Old Swiss Confederacy; to defend the city, Renzo da Ceri had all the isolated buildings around the walls knocked down, had the ditches lowered and settled in the sanctuary of Santa Maria della Croce turned into a fort. On the night of August 25, 1514, there was the final assault of Renzo da Ceri's troops in the camp of the Sforzeschi and the Swiss at Ombriano, routing them and finally freeing the Crema region from the invading forces.

Already a few years later, however, doubts began to be expressed about the defensive efficiency of the city; it was especially the introduction of the new offensive techniques based on the use of gunpowder that was the most important critical issue encountered by the relators in those years since that of Governor Sforza Pallavicino in 1548.

==== 17th and 18th centuries ====
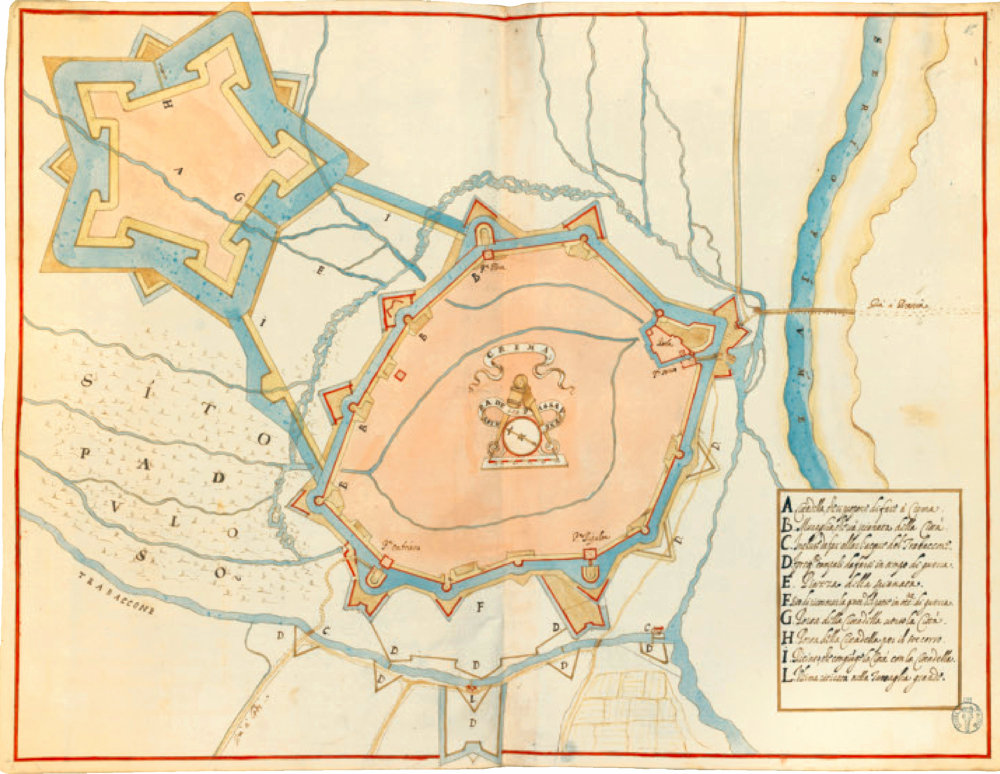
Historical map of Crema, c. 1630, by Francesco Tansini, pen and sepia drawing, with watercolor, on paper, plan of the city walls with the never realized hypothesis of the construction of a pentagonal fortress, preserved in the Municipal Library of Treviso

The situation was revealed in all its drama at the time of the political crisis that began in 1606 with the breakdown of diplomatic relations between the Venetian Republic and the Church State and the real possibility of the entry of Spain into the battlefield in support of the pope. The Venetian province of Crema was practically an exclave surrounded by the State of Milan and was being militarized through massive enlistment of manpower, reinforcement of border surveillance and provision of extensive artillery. In 1606 the general superintendent in the mainland Lorenzo Priuli arrived in Crema on inspection, who observed with distress the inadequacy of the city walls.

A map from a few years later shows some of the interventions: these are fortifications outside the castle, at the ravelins of the gates and the towers of the enclosure. It is not dated, but it is signed by the distinguished military engineer Francesco Tansini (1580–1638, of Crema origin) and dated in all probability around the year 1620. It is inferred from the caption that it was Tansini himself who was responsible for rebuilding the interventions undertaken earlier by Marcello Alessandrini.

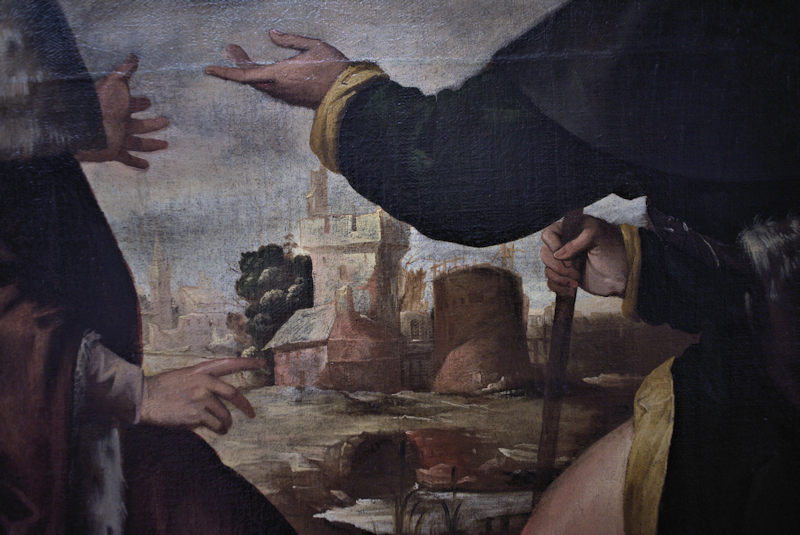
Crema and its walls in the 17th century, detail from oil on canvas "Madonna and Child with Saints Pantaleone, Rocco and Sebastian," by Bernardino Fusario, Crema, Civic Museum of Crema

Several times during the seventeenth and eighteenth centuries projects for adaptation and improvement were proposed: these were sometimes radical, sometimes innovative interventions, but the substantial public funding that would be required was the greatest deterrent to their concreteness. One project by Tansini, among many others, is of particular interest: it is a signed but undated map (probably made around 1630) that envisaged the construction of a pentagonal citadel northwest of the city, toward the Moso marsh. The same also provided for a fortified area to the south, between the walls and the Cresmiero, intended as a refuge for the people of the contado in case of war.

Filippo Verneda's Relatione della città di Crema, dated April 15, 1683, meticulously describes Crema's fortifications and does not fail to expose their shortcomings: works that were too small, design flaws (e.g., the lack of space to create an embankment on the lunette of Porta Ombriano). the embankment of unequal height and too close to the dwellings, and many others.

In a 1771 annotation, podestà Angelo Giustinian wrote how at "the Foscolo station" there was a breach that favored overpassing and thus the nocturnal entry of thugs and the practice of smuggling.

==== 19th century ====
In 1803 the Cisalpine Republic decreed Crema an "Open City," initiating the new urban reorganization; with a resolution of March 12, 1804, it was determined that the gates should be demolished. While Porta Ripalta and Porta Pianengo were bricked up, for Porta Serio and Porta Ombriano the architect Faustino Rodi was entrusted with their renovation; the Cremonese architect, who was already overseeing the work on the new bridge over the Cresmiero in Crema, opted for a total neoclassical makeover.

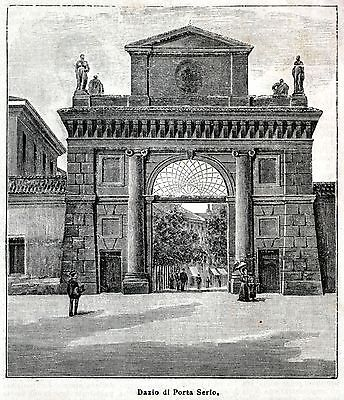
Porta Serio in 1896, with the toll booths, taken from "Le cento città d'Italia," monthly illustrated supplement of the Secolo, Sonzogno Editore, 1896

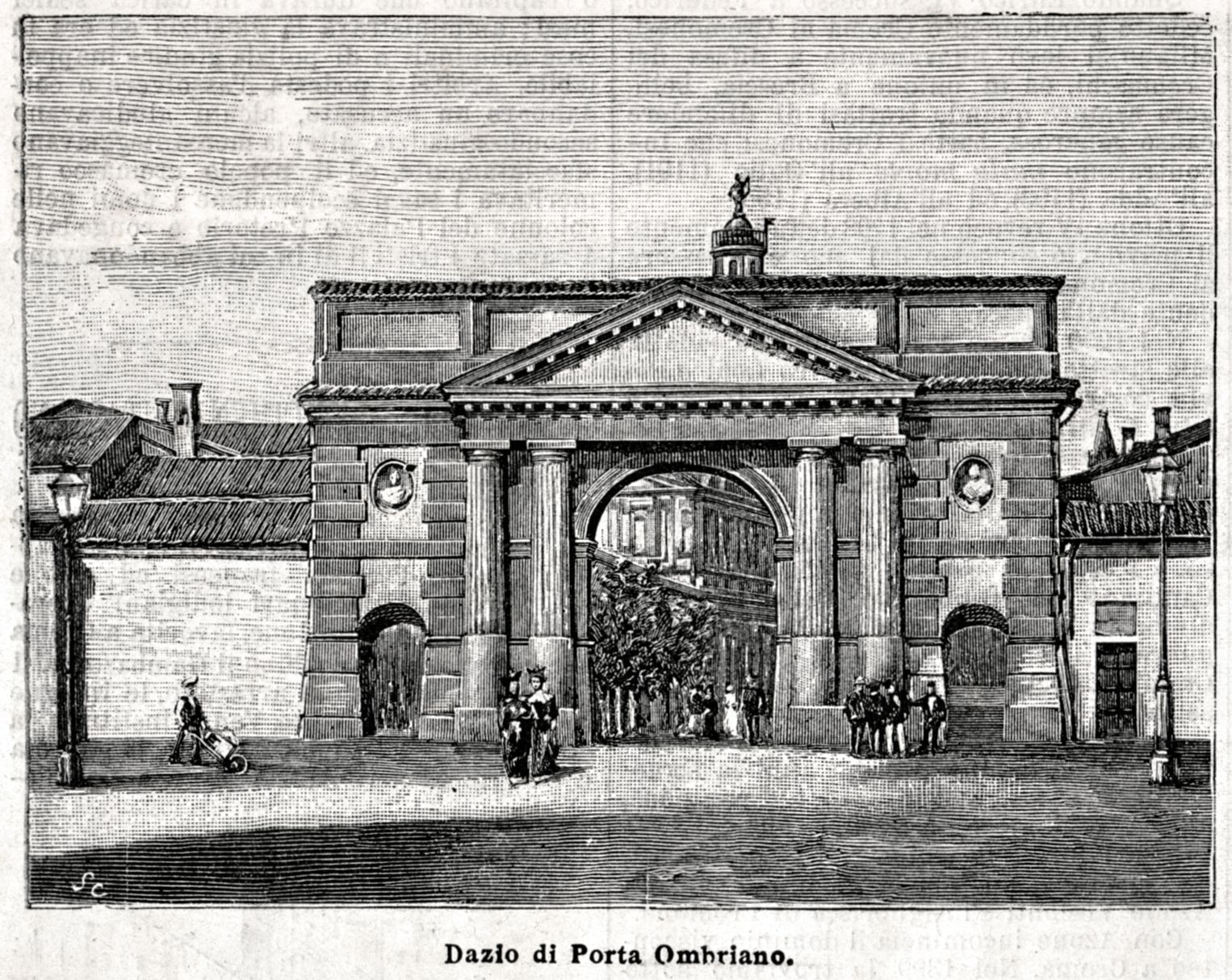
Porta Ombriano in 1896, with the tollhouses, taken from "Le cento città d'Italia," monthly illustrated supplement to the Secolo, Sonzogno Editore, 1896

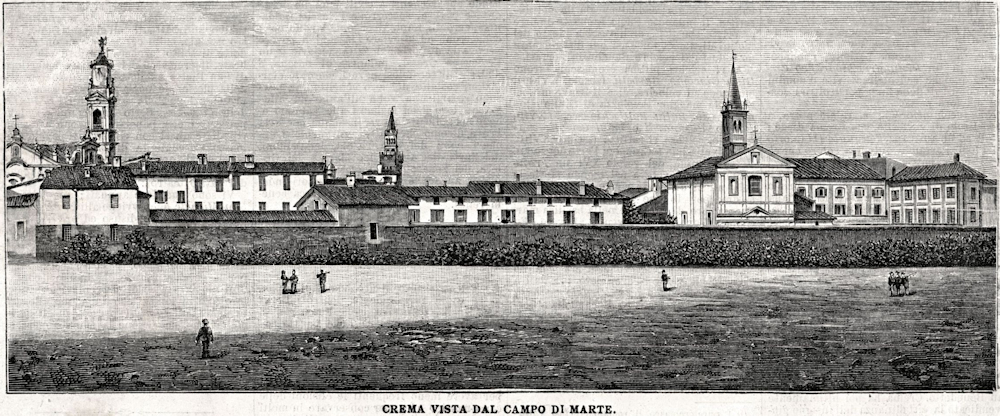
The walls and the city from the Campo di Marte, taken from "Le cento città d'Italia," monthly illustrated supplement to the Secolo, Sonzogno Editore, 1896

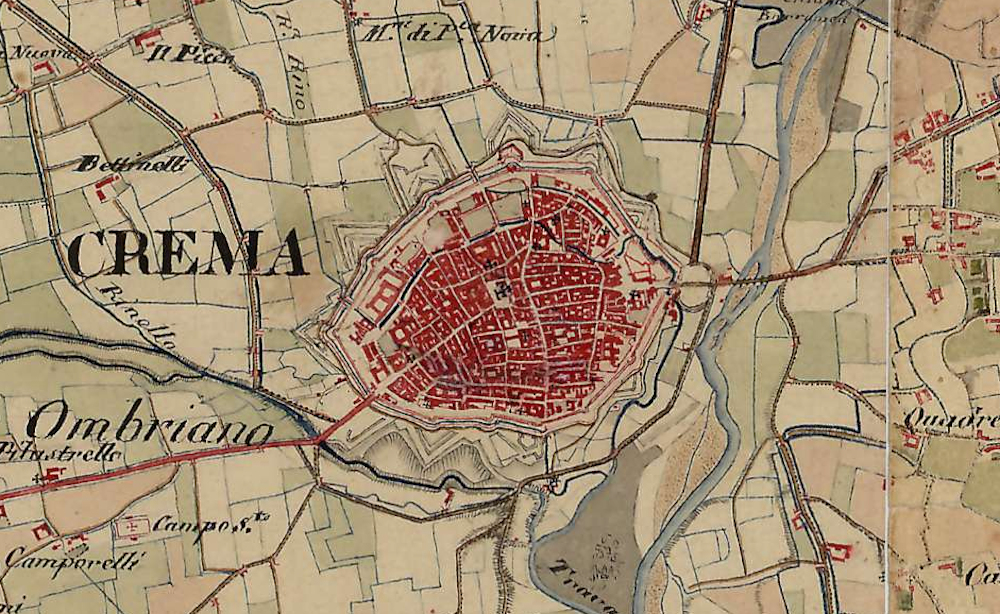
In the 1818–1829 map, the shape of the ramparts is still evident, but the recent construction of the Rotonda del passeggio (today's Piazzale Rimembranze) can be seen. Excerpt from the map Lombardei, Venedig, Parma, Modena (1818–1829) – Franziszeische Landesaufnahme, preserved in the Österreichisches Staatsarchiv.

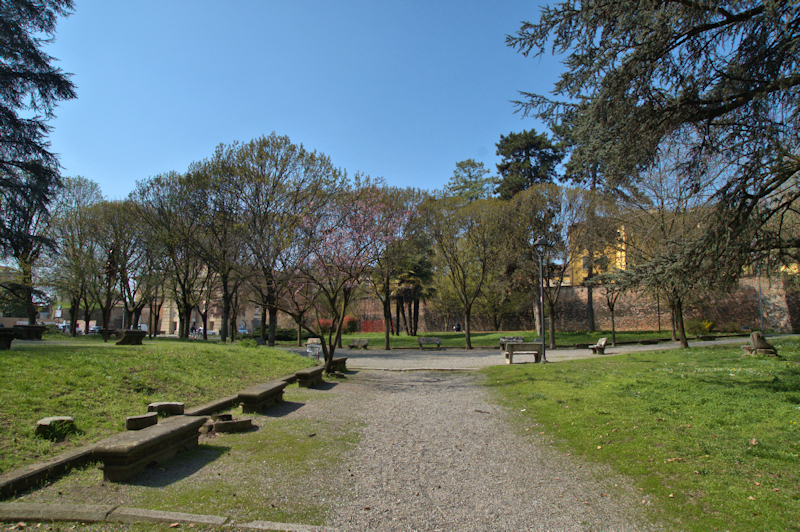
The public gardens of Porta Serio

In 1809 the Royal State Property Office sold the Porta Serio Castle, which was gradually demolished together with the outer rampart on the area of which a few decades later – in 1858 – public gardens were built there.

The suppression of many religious orders dates back to 1810 and, among them, was that of the Dominican nuns also known as Santa Maria Mater Domini, who were based in a seventeenth-century complex located northwest of the city; in 1817 the new Austrian government converted the former convent into barracks by installing there the "Imperiali Regii Stalloni" intended for the improvement of horse breeds. To gain space, a section of the wall was demolished and a more advanced, high wall was built.

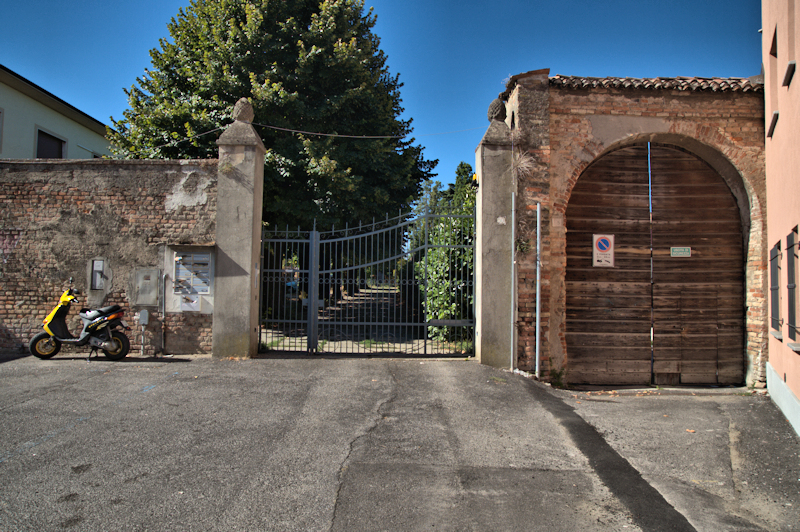
From the public Via Valera, beyond the gate a remnant section of the "Promenade of the Bastions" that once ran along the southern embankment can be glimpsed.

Based on a design by engineer Luigi Massari in 1833, a roadway was planned at the foot of the southern embankment, from the present-day Piazza Garibaldi to Via Kennedy; this road, built mainly for the purpose of speeding up access to the Ospedale Maggiore for those coming from outside the city, was initially known as Viale alle Mura, or Passeggio dei Bastioni. It was later called Via dell'Ospitale and then, pursuant to a mayoral resolution in 1931, Via dell'Assedio.

In the year 1881, on the other hand, the idea of adding a third gateway in the walls in addition to the existing Porta Serio and Porta Ombriano was put forward. A few years earlier, in 1863, operation of the Treviglio-Cremona railway line was started, but the temporary building and related switches were already at that time considered too close to the "Provinciale bergamasca," hence the idea of building the future and final station on the extension of Via Tadini. However, the costs of building a new road and a new toll gate were the reasons that scuttled the project.

==== 20th and 21st centuries ====
Until the last years of the 19th century, urban expansion outside the historic center, resulting in increased trade, required greater ease of access to the city, hence the abolition, in the early 20th century, of the nighttime closure of the gates and entry duties.

Dating back to 1919, however, was the decision to tear down the now unused tollhouses, thus isolating the two gates that had been employed as entrance architectural monuments.

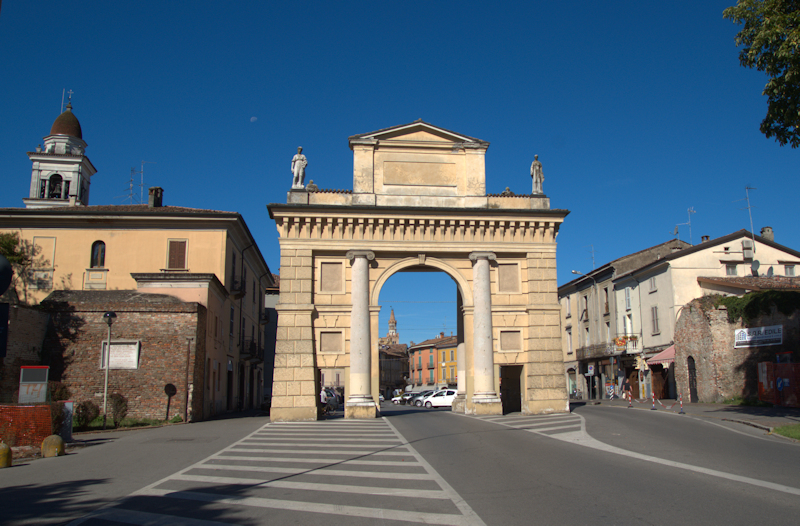
Serio Gate

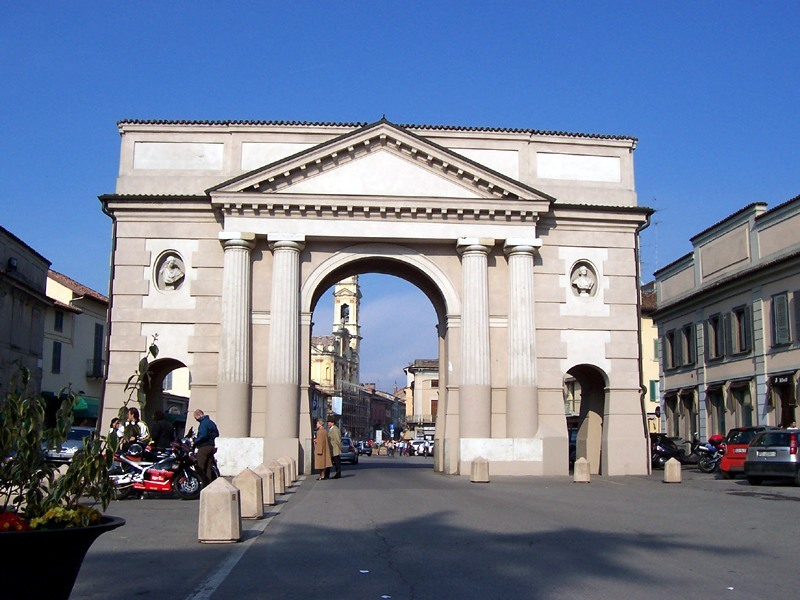
Ombriano Gate

Thus, all administrative functions ceased and given the need to interact more easily with the outside area, new gateways were opened from 1903.

- 1903: Tadini Street;
- 1907: reopening of Porta Ripalta (at that time, between Via Vittorio Emanuele II and Via Piacenza);
- 1907: Borgo San Pietro street;
- 1907: reopening of Porta Pianengo, in Santa Chiara street;
- 1911: Monte di Pietà street, at that time a continuation of Ponte Furio street;
- 1911: Quartierone street;
- 1924: Medaglie d'Oro street, at the time Piazza delle Teresine;
- 1928: Federico Pesadori street;
- 1934: Valera street;
- 1982: Massari street.
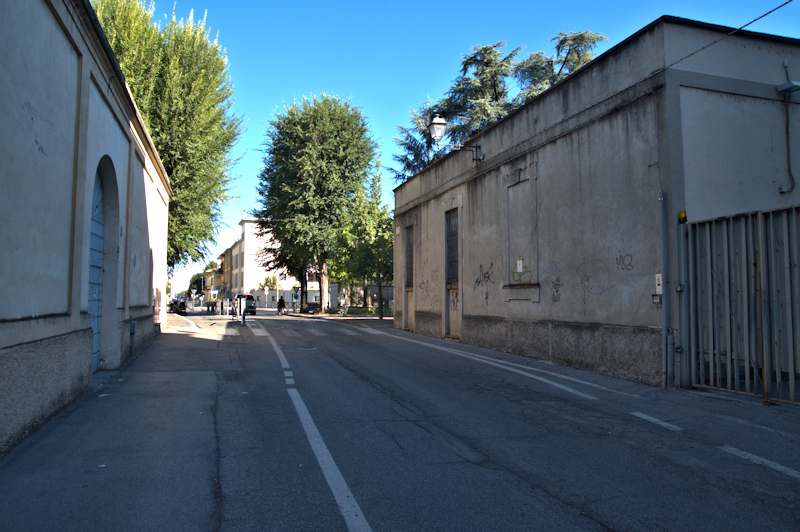
Via Tadini

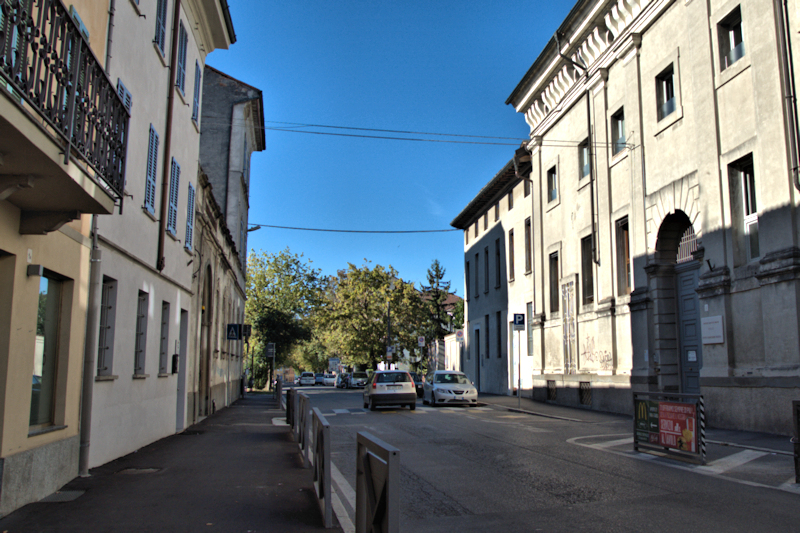
Via Kennedy, where Porta Ripalta once stood.

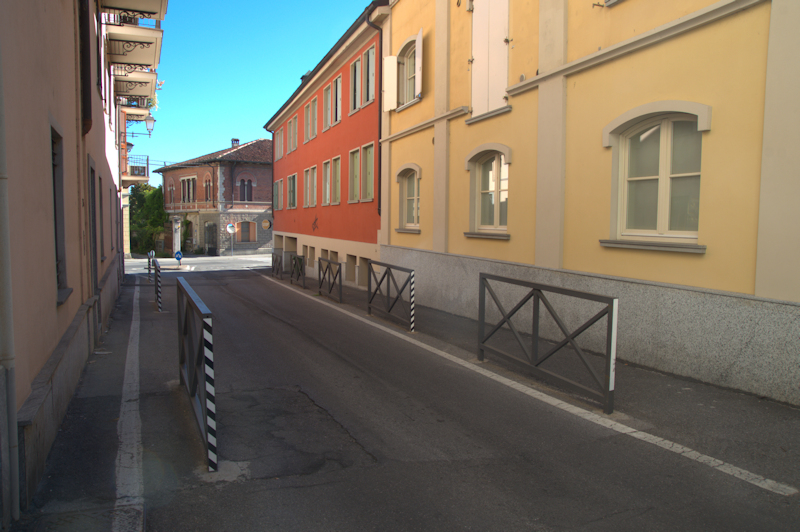
Via Borgo San Pietro

Via Santa Chiara; once there stood Porta Pianengo (or Porta Nova)

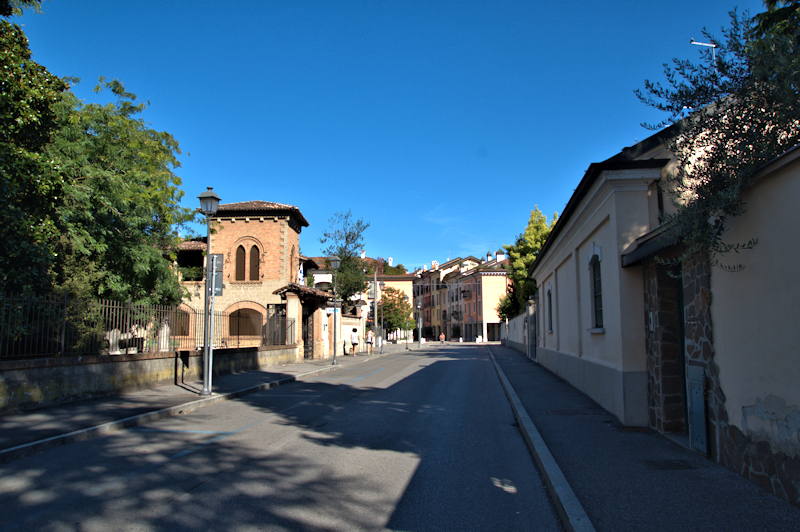
Via Monte di Pietà

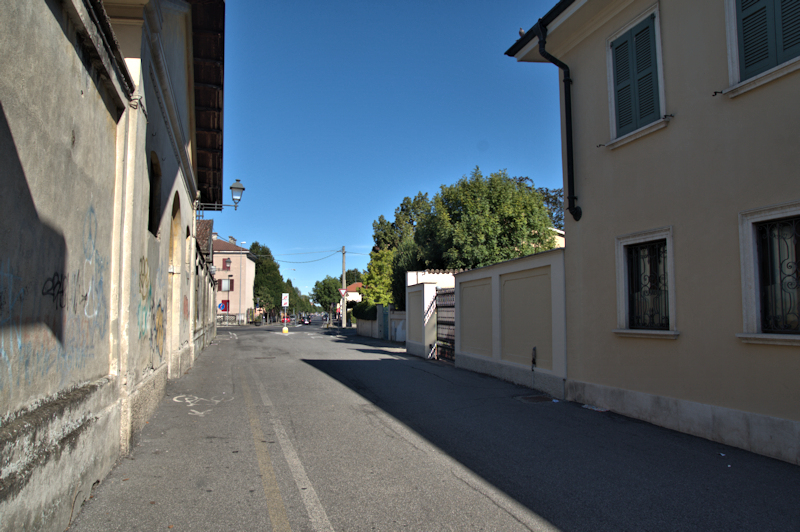
Via Quartierone

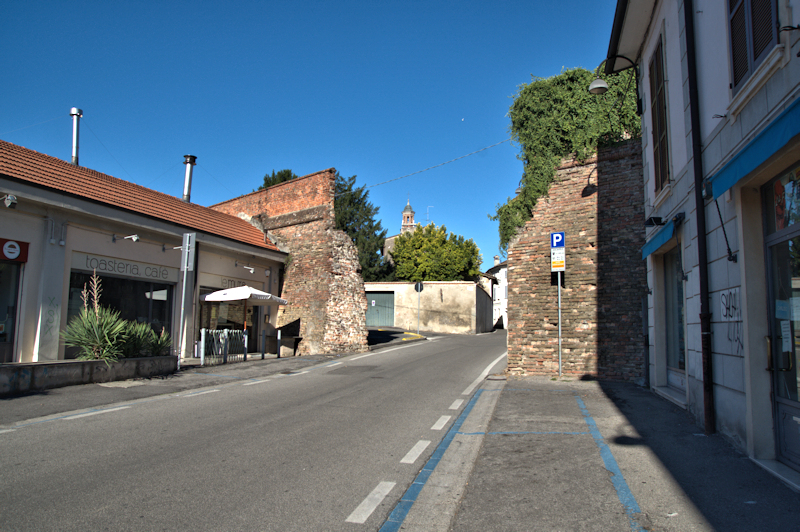
Via Pesadori

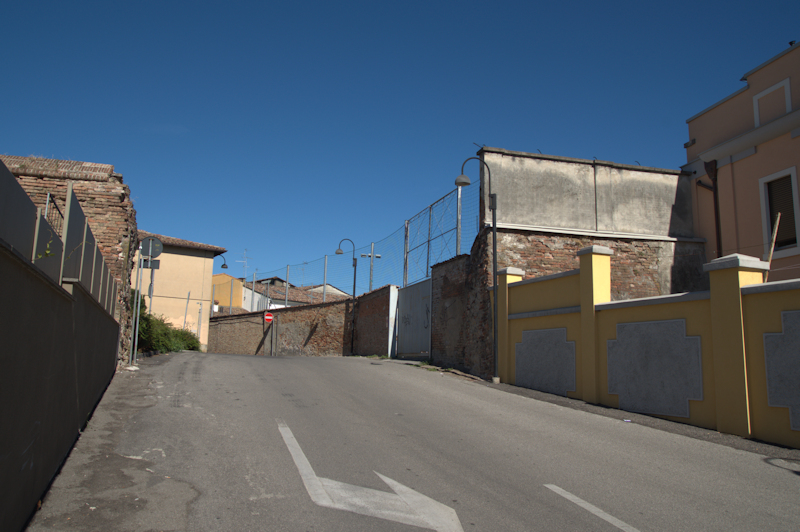
Via Valera

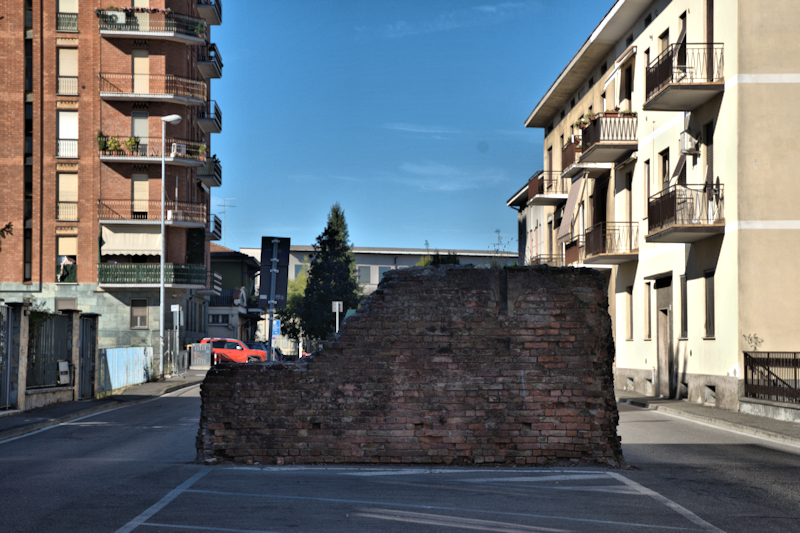
Via Massari

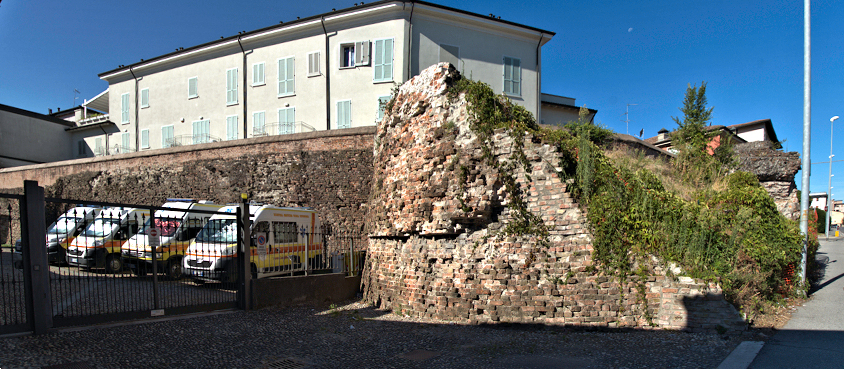
The remains of the Torrion Foscolo in Via Stazione

A stretch of wall is linked to a tragic episode that occurred during World War II; Crema was also bombed by Anglo-American Allied forces and the primary target was the railway bridge over the Serio River. However, on December 30, 1944, shortly after lunchtime a bomb hit the Torrion Foscolo inside which Teresa Ragazzi Bissa (41) and worker Bruno Pizzeghello (38), an employee of an electrical company that was located right in front of the tower, had sought refuge there; the two perished under the rubble. After the conflict ended, the remains of the keep were not removed as a future memorial to the event.

A council resolution in 1948 suppressed the southern road abutting the rampart of the walls – the Via dell'Assedio – and the area was ceded to the local residents; it also legalized the subdivision of the areas once occupied by the ramparts, a choice that many would later call "improper" and "nonsensical."

It was in the 1950s that the project to expand the "Hospital Institutes," which were then located in the built-up complex on Kennedy Street, was undertaken. In 1955, a grant of ten million liras was provided by the High Commission for Hygiene and Sanitation contingent on the expansion of the Dyskinetic Department, and, in any case, the hospital needed new space to cope with the increase in admissions and inpatients. The resulting expansion project included the construction of a new monoblock occupying the space of the moat immediately beyond the city walls and related “tampering” of the “bastion of the Venetian walls”. The veto of the Superintendence placed the hospital's Board of Directors in a position to consider other solutions, including the erection of a new infrastructure elsewhere, a decision finally made in October 1960.

Also in 1960, at the conclusion of a series of celebratory events dedicated to the eighth centenary of Frederick Barbarossa's siege, a commemorative plaque was placed on the Venetian walls, near Porta Serio, in memory of the historic event; it reads:

TO THE HEROES OF CREMA
WHO ON THE CITY WALLS
FOR THE DEFENCE OF MUNICIPAL LIBERTIES
AGAINST FREDERICK BARBAROSSA
FEARLESSLY FOUGHT AND FELL
TO THE MARTYRED HOSTAGES
WHO MADE CREMA DISTINGUISHED

THE MINDFUL CITIZENS
ON THE VIII CENTENARY OF THE SIEGE
MCMLX

In the 1980s had originated the idea, never fulfilled, of creating a pedestrian path to connect the urban green areas of Porta Serio and the Campo di Marte gardens by partially restoring the old patrol path and the remaining vacant areas at the foot of the walls.

During the early 2000s the former Villa&Bonaldi factory, built on the northeastern exterior of the walls in 1924, was demolished, a cobblestone parking lot was built under the walls, and a large section of the walls under Via Castello was returned to public view.

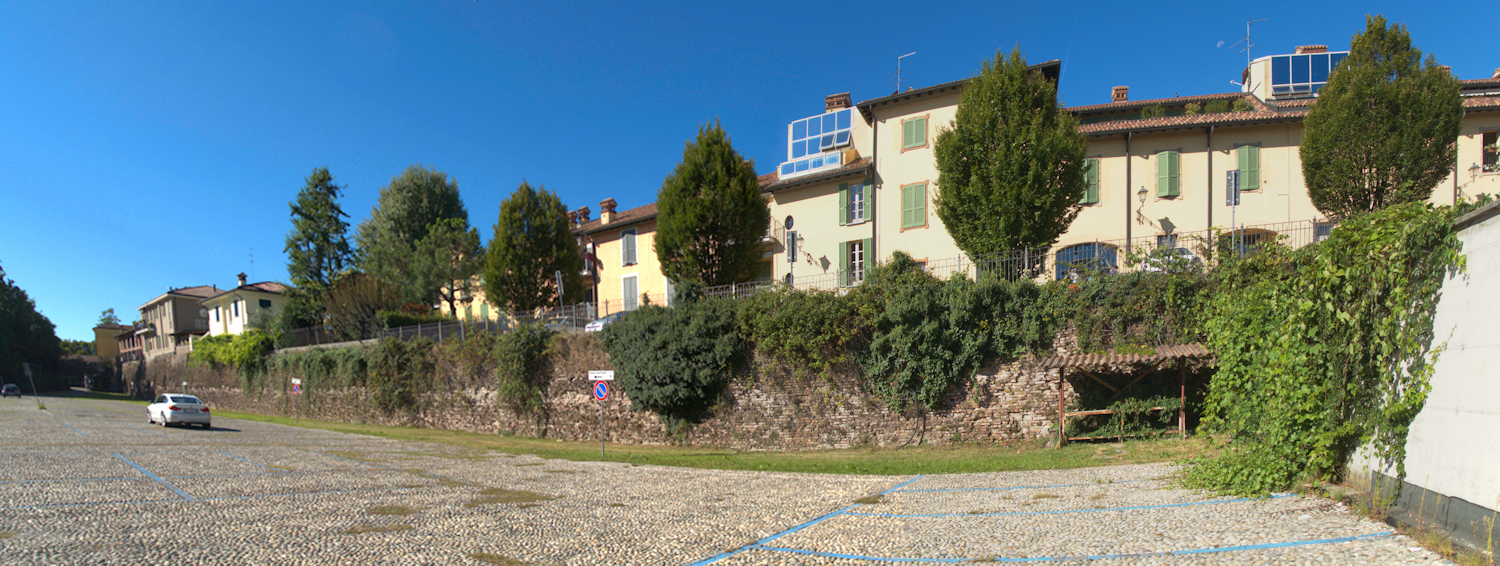
Crema's Venetian walls pictured from the parking lot built in the early 2000s on the area of a demolished factory

=== The castle of Porta Serio ===
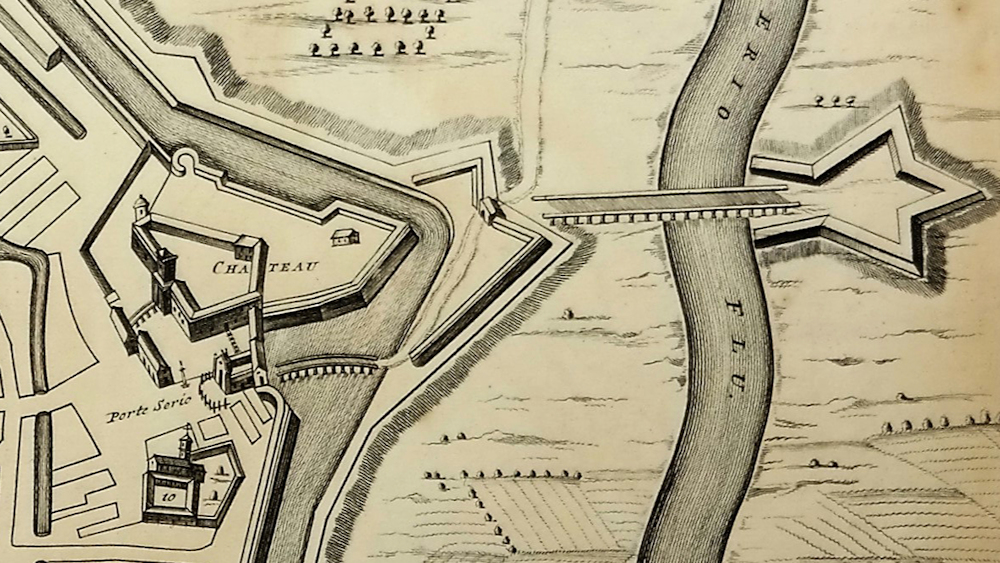
Excerpt from the map of Crema with the castle, made by Pierre Mortier, etching, Amsterdam, 1708

The castle in front of Porta Serio was built according to late medieval principles in 1335, was later enlarged and became the seat of the castellan and garrison; in Filippo Verneda's Relatione of 1683, it is described as a structure with walls of perfect quality, with angular towers both square and round, with an outer pit "of 9 steps" also on the side facing the city and a counterscarp "12 feet high." Inside was the place-of-arms, rooms for the accommodation of soldiers and storerooms for weapons; on an upper floor there was accommodation for the castellan. The Relatione goes on to describe the exterior, where it mentions, in support of the castle's defense, the rampart and keep. Verneda believes that the castle, "although an ancient work," was "valuable in many ways... because it could always keep the city in good order."

The castle was sold for the sum of 34,000 liras by the Royal State Property Office of Lodi to a company – formed by Counts Barni, Passerini and Bonelli – which resold it to master builder Gaetano Viscardi, who gradually began to demolish it and, starting in 1822, built new houses on the cleared area.

There is precise iconographic evidence of the castle that has documentary value: on the walls of the hall of Villa Severgnini in Izano, the painter Angelo Mora made a series of eight tempera landscapes, commissioned by Gaetano Severgnini; one of these depicts the castle pictured from the north, toward today's Via Luigi Griffini, together with the houses called "chiodere" on the right and the bell tower of San Benedetto in the background.

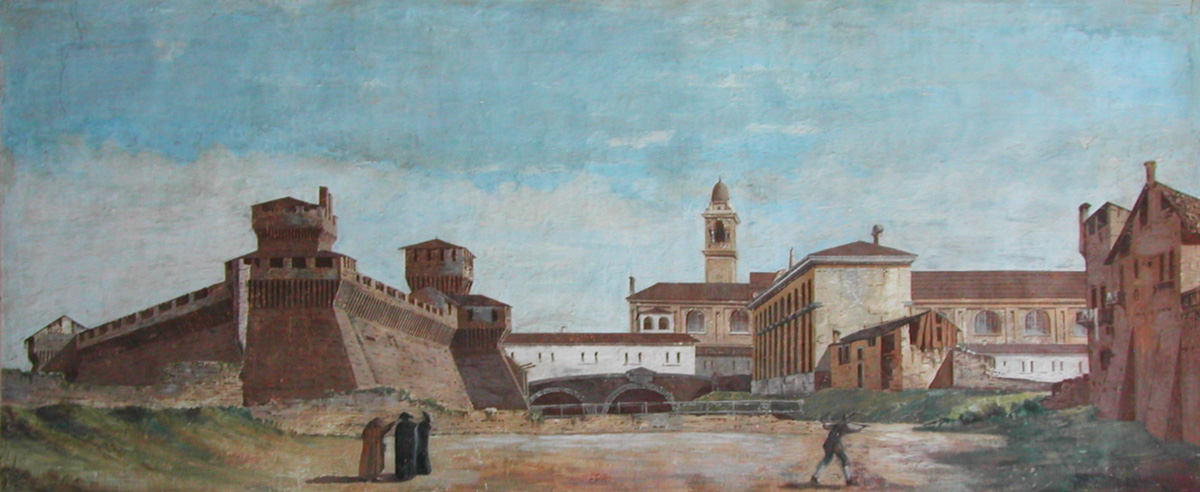
Angelo Mora, The Castle of Crema, tempera, m 1.92 x 4, Villa Severgnini, Izano

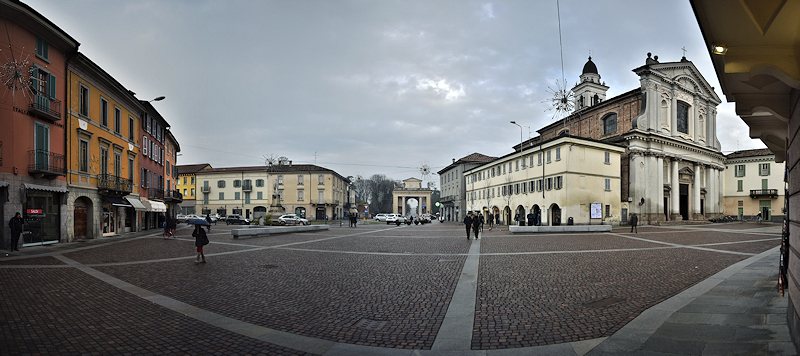
Piazza Garibaldi in 2017, photographed from the same angle that reproduces the castle of Crema in Angelo Mora's tempera

=== The castle of Porta Ombriano ===
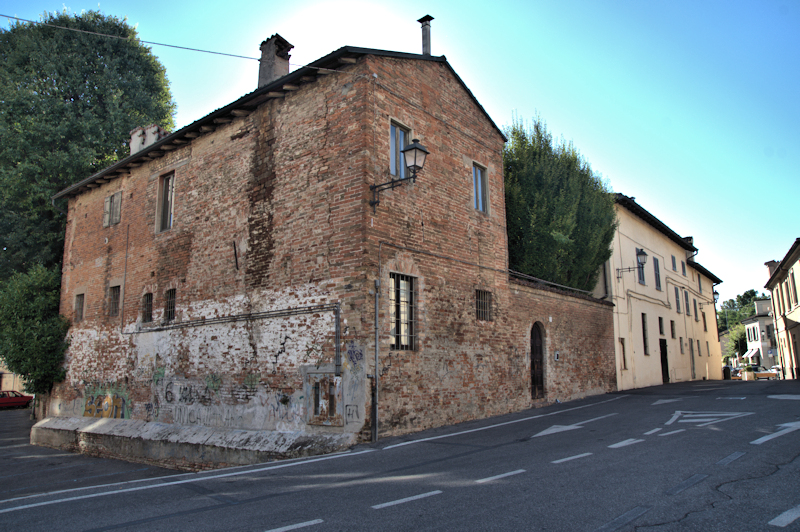
The block of Palazzo Terni, pictured from Via Massari, on which the castle of Porta Ombriano supposedly stood

It stood north of the Porta, on the area of Palazzo Terni, erected in 1370; in 1379 Carlo, the son of Bernabò Visconti, settled there in a tower which, according to Sforza Benvenuti, "was the scene of many love affairs" and was therefore called the Tower of Paradise, a name later given to the nearby keep.

In 1403 Ghibelline factions besieged by Guelph factions and backed by Cabrino Fondulo took refuge there; on that occasion Gentilino Soardo, leader of the Ghibellines from Bergamo who had been called to help the people of Crema, ended up seriously wounded.

The castle was demolished by the Venetians in 1451 and part of the land was sold to the convent of the nuns of Saint Monica.

== Features ==
The walls encircle the historic center almost entirely, except in the northwest area. The ovoid shape is interspersed by the circular or polygonal gates and towers.

The walls were surrounded by an outer moat provided with a counterscarp and of which a section still exists at the gardens of Campo di Marte.

The actual walls have a sloping scarp with, at the top, a semicircular curb, formed by molded bricks; the facing is of exposed brick, while the inner core is filled with cement mortar, scrap materials or pounded bricks, a system that allowed faster construction and less time required to complete it; in some sections a seventeenth-century elevation still exists.

On the side towards the town center there was an embankment; examples are visible when passing along Giovanni Gervasoni Street and inside the San Luigi sports center. For access to the ramparts, internal stairs had been built with the presence of covered walkways: there is still a section of about 130 meters between the Torrion della Madonna and Porta Ombriano, with a barrel vault and embrasures placed at a distance of 8 meters at human height dating most likely to the early period, suitable for the use of crossbows and arquebuses.

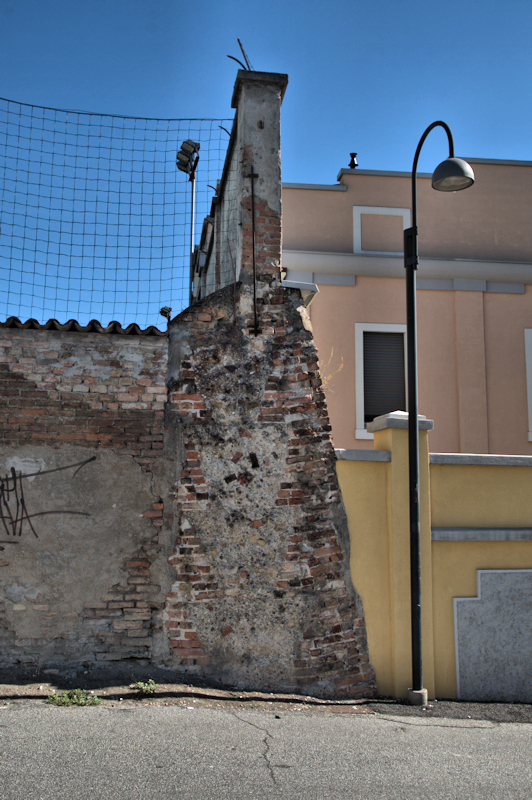
Section of the walls (breaching of Valera Street)

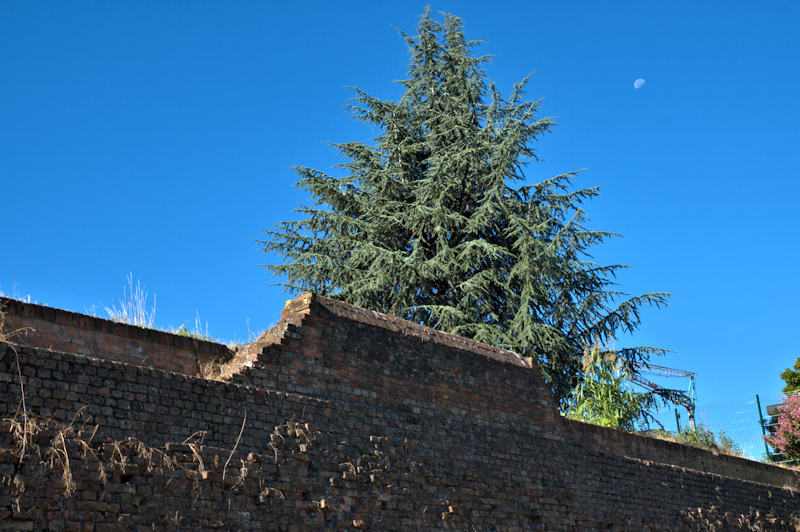
Detail of the elevation of a rampart

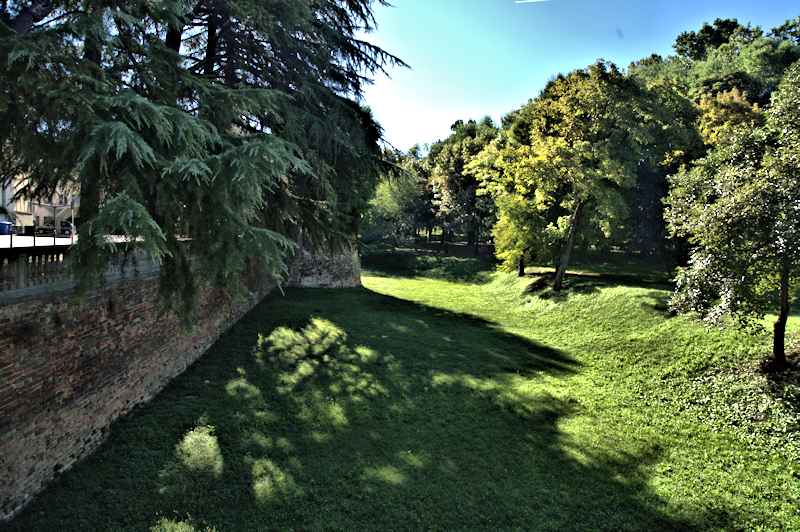
A residual section of a moat at the gardens of Campo di Marte

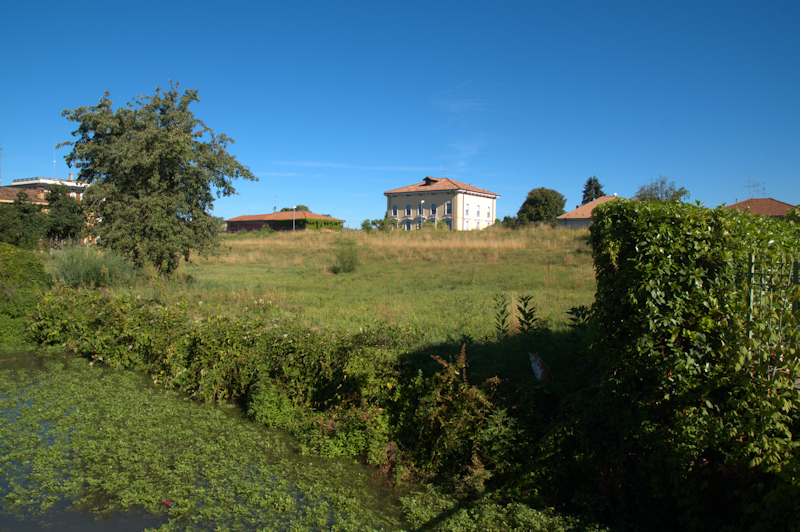
The embankment of Via Gervasoni

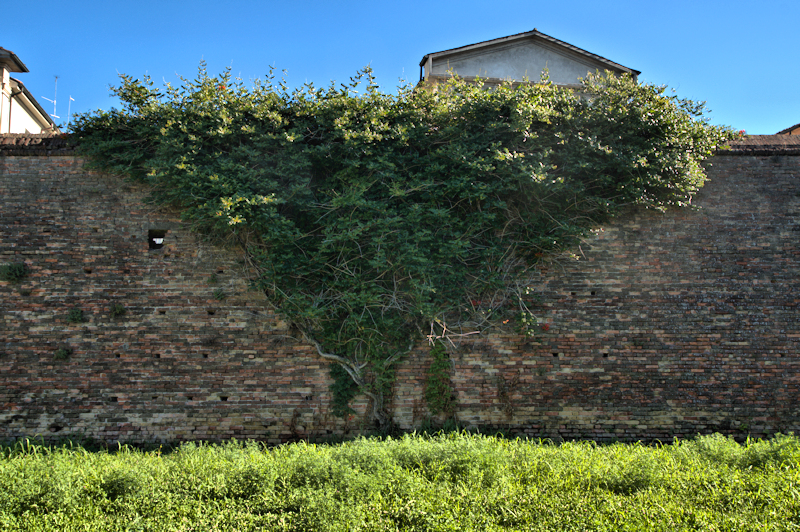
Detail of the brick veneer

== Image gallery ==
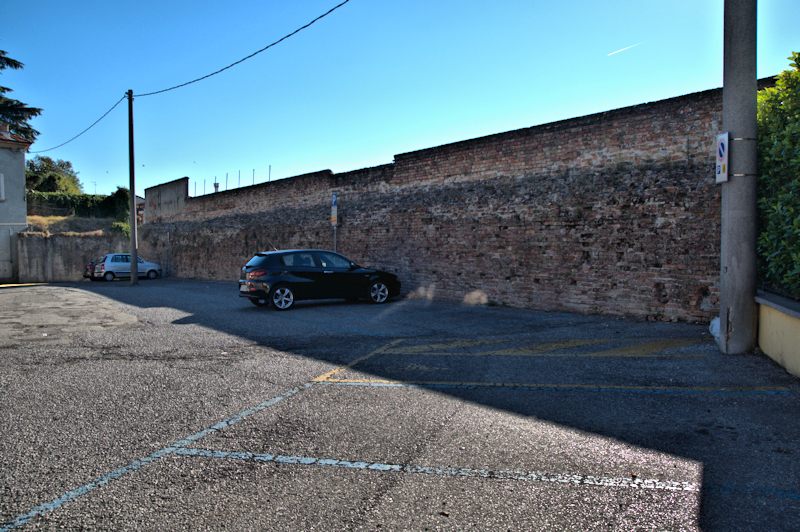
Interior view from Via Pesadori

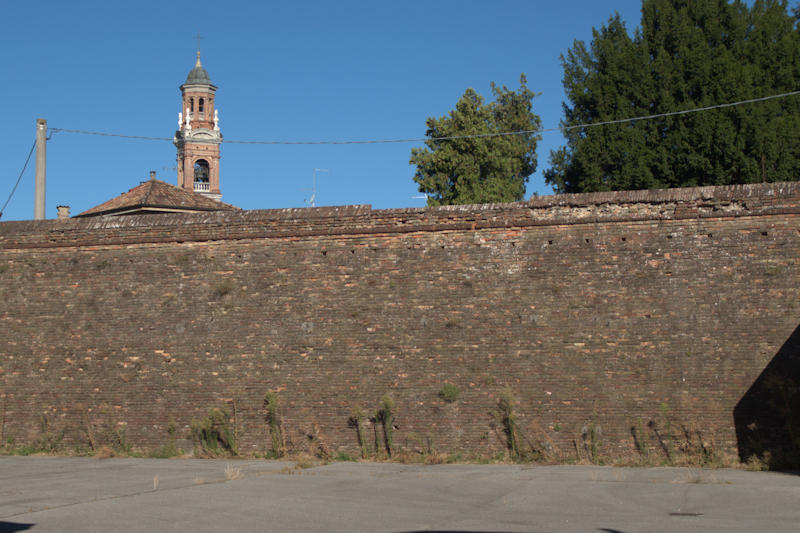
Exterior view from Via Diaz

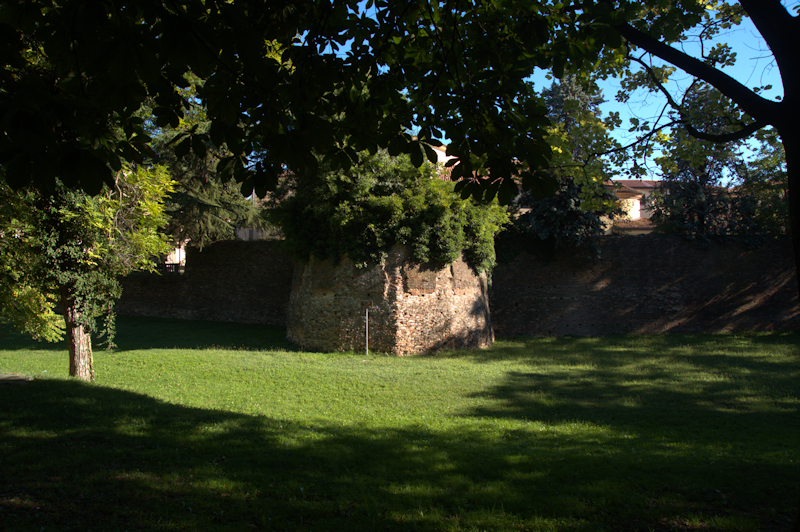
The Torrion della Madonna and a part of the moat

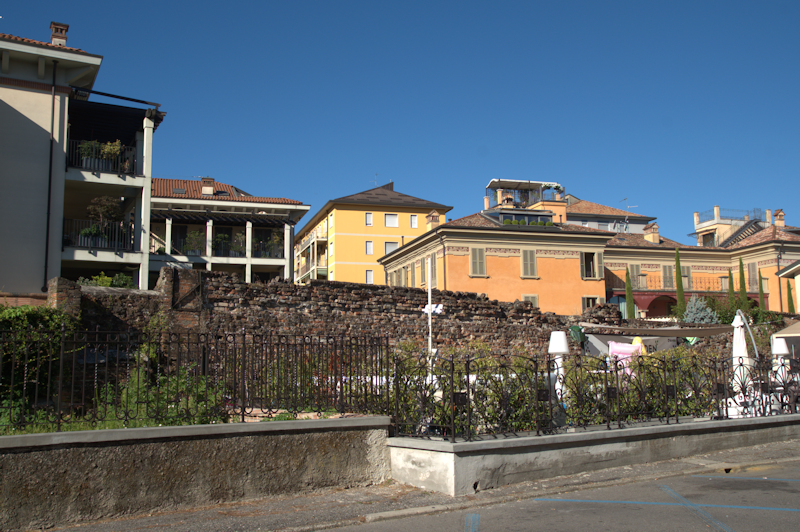
Interior view from Via delle Grazie

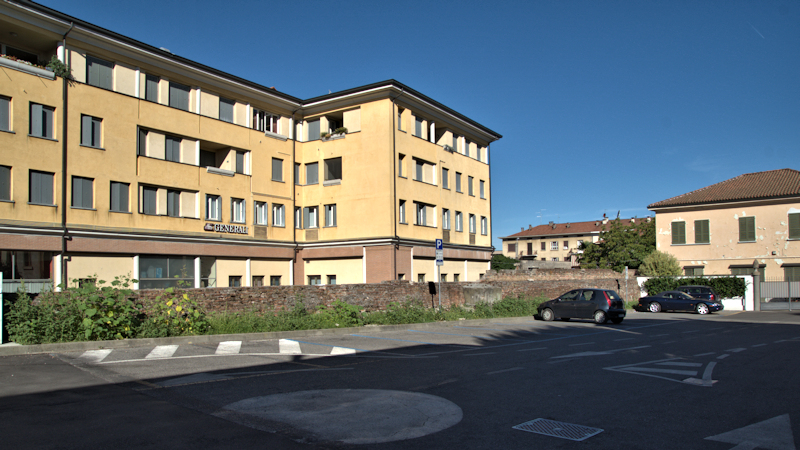
Interior view from Via Massari

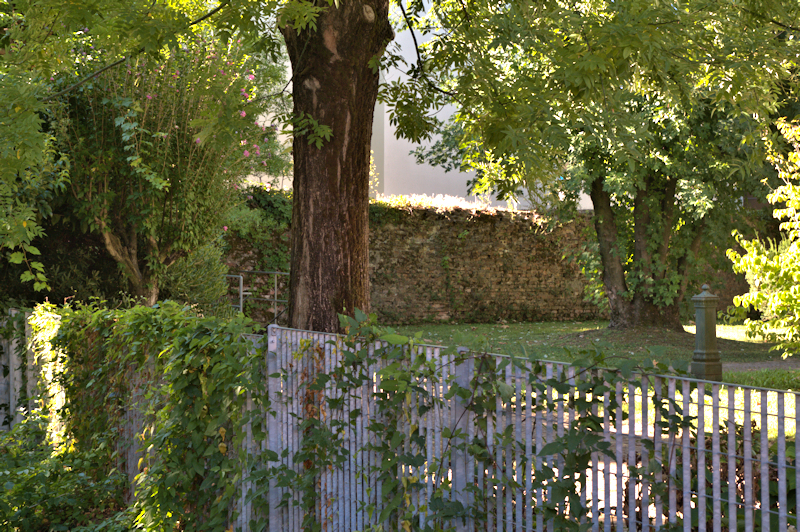
Glimpse inside the ‘Gianna Manenti Agello’ park, seen from the public Via Stazione

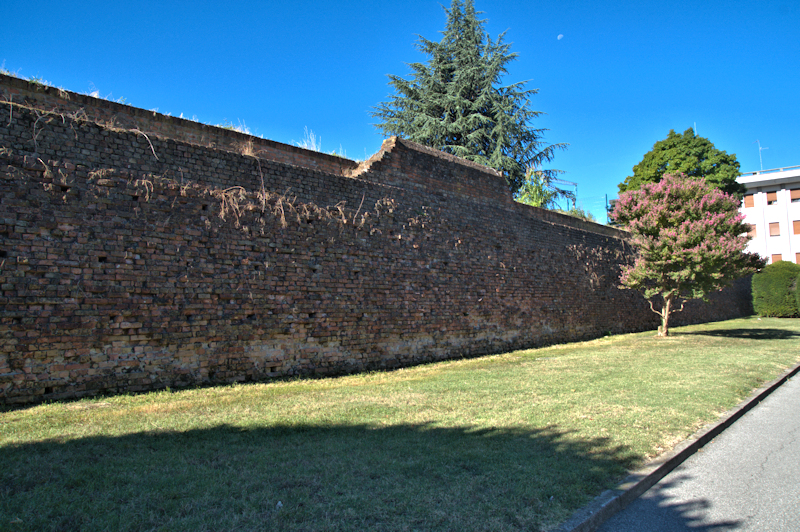
Glimpse from Via Stazione

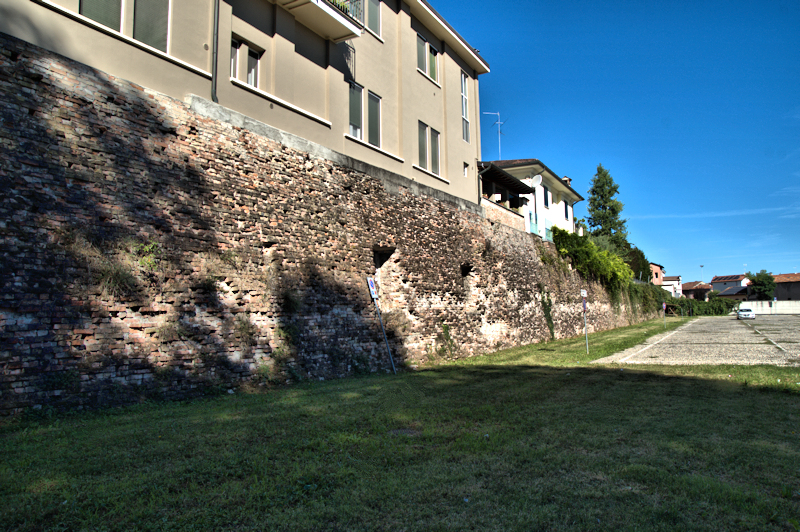
View from the car park accessible from Via Stazione

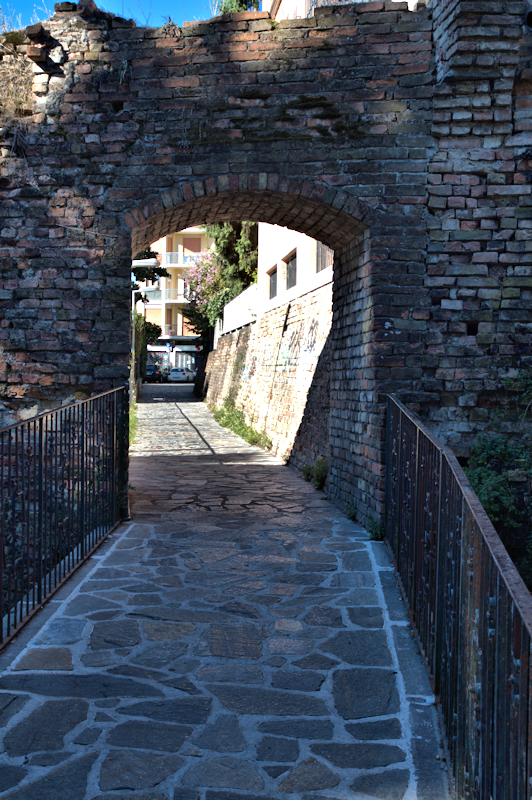
Pedestrian walkway between Piazza Garibaldi and the public gardens of Porta Serio

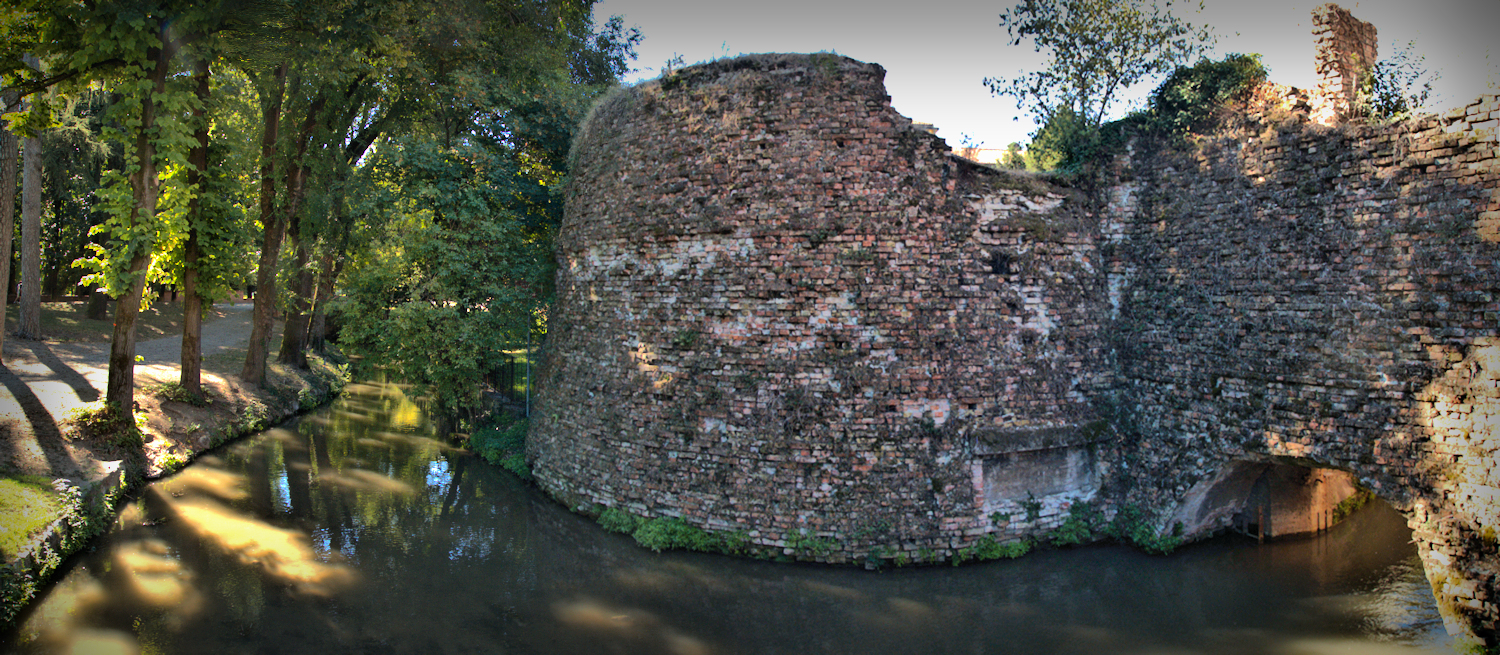
The Castle Keep

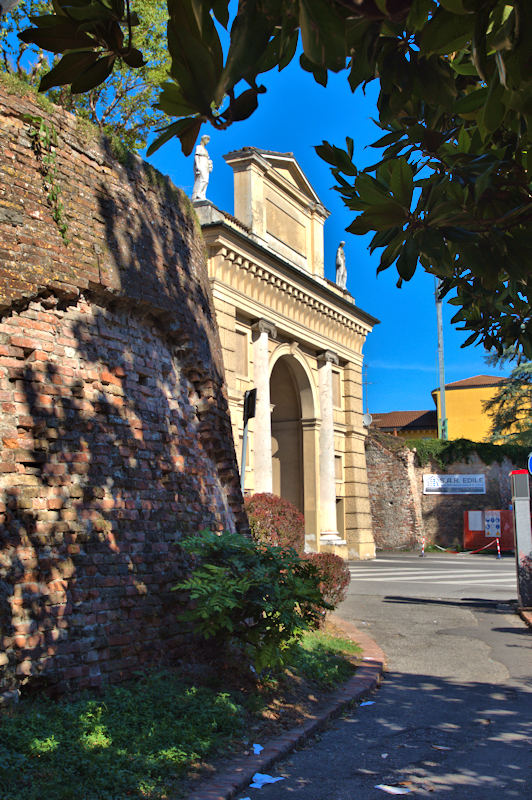
The Torrion di Porta Serio and the gate of the same name

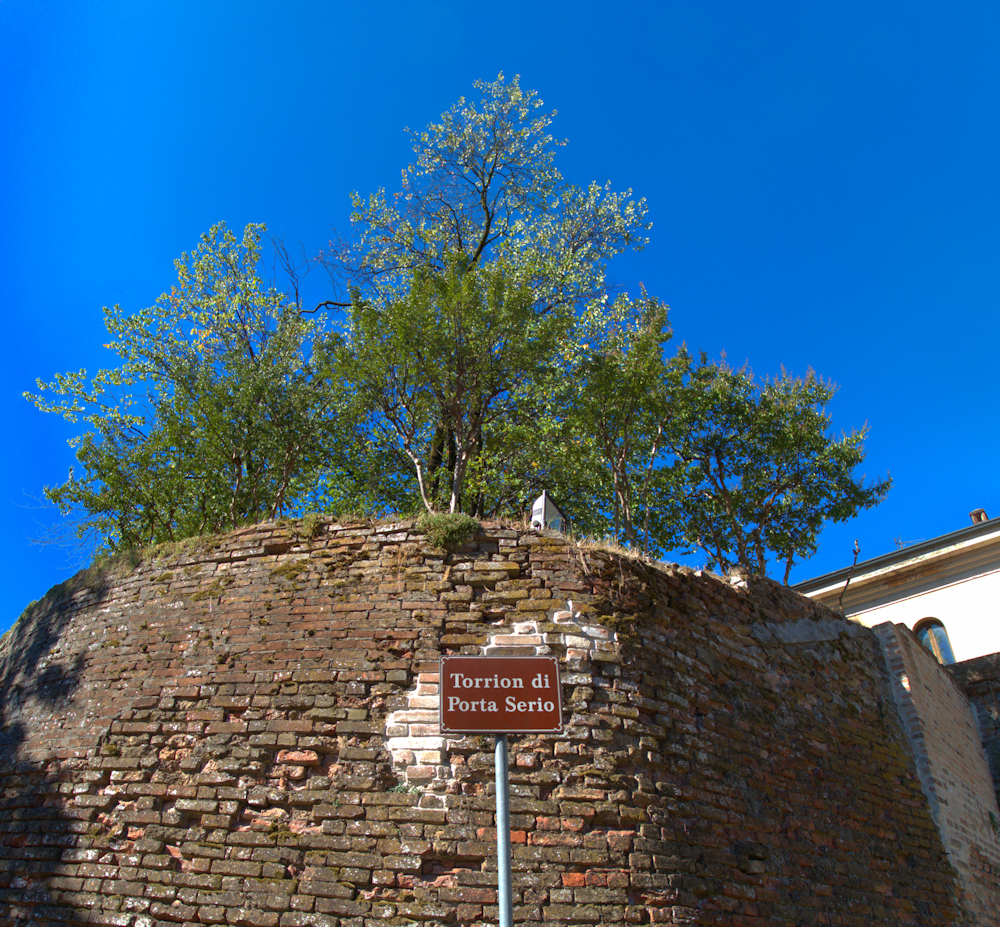
The Torrion di Porta Serio

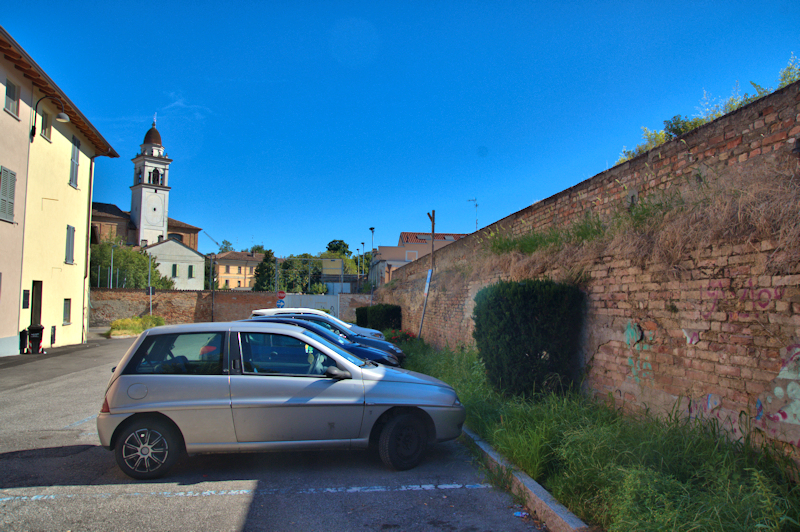
Interior view of Via Valera

== See also ==
- Crema, Lombardy
- Church of Saint Bernardino of Siena (Crema)
- Major Hospital of Crema

== Bibliography ==
- Fino, Alemanio (1566). La historia di crema raccolta da gli annali di Pietro Terni. Venezia: Appresso Domenico Farri.
- Sforza Benvenuti, Francesco (1859). Storia di Crema, vol. 1. Milano: Giuseppe Bernardoni.
- Perolini, Mario (1976). Origini dei nomi delle strade di Crema. Cremona: Tipografia Padana.
- Perolini, Mario (1982). Crema e il suo territorio. Cremona: Tipografia Padana.
- Morandi, Mariella (1991). Porta Serio e Porta Ombriano in Insula Fulcheria. Crema: Leva Artigrafiche.
- Edallo, Dado (1995). La formazione del tessuto urbano in L'immagine di Crema. Crema: Leva Artigrafiche.
- AA.VV. (1995). 50 anni fa Crema e i cremaschi dal settembre '43 all'aprile '45. Crema: Buona Stampa.
- AA.VV. (1996). La ferrovia e le attività economiche a Crema nel tempo. Crema: Edizioni Tipolito Uggé.
- Favole, Paolo (1996). Storia urbana di Crema in Insula Fucheria. Crema: Leva Artigrafiche.
- Zucchelli, Giorgio (2000). Le ville storiche del cremasco, vol. 3. Crema: Buona Stampa.
- Albinio, Giuliana (2006). Crema e il Cremasco nel Medioevo: una comunità aperta in Insula Fulcheria. Crema: Leva Artigrafiche.
- Cassi, Mario (2009). L’850° dell’assedio di Crema e il bicentenario della distruzione del Castello di Porta Serio in Insula Fulcheria. Crema: Leva Artigrafiche.
- Savoia, Pietro (2010). La provincia “veneta" di Crema nell’età del rinascimento (1449-1530) in Insula Fulcheria. Crema: Leva Artigrafiche.
- Benzoni, Gino (2010). Crema: un’identità sotto Venezia in Insula Fulcheria. Crema: Leva Artigrafiche.
- Tosato, Stefano (2014). Fortezze veneziane dall'Adda all'Egeo. Le difese della Repubblica di Venezia nei disegni della Biblioteca Comunale di Treviso (secoli XVI-XVIII). Venezia: Marco Polo System g.e.i.e.
- Venchiarutti, Walter (2015). Le mura venete: storia e funzioni in Le mura di Crema.
- Bertozzi/Edallo/Giora/Venchiarutti/Zanini (2015). La cinta muraria di Crema in Le mura di Crema.
