= Giovanni Philippone =

Italian painter (1922–1993)

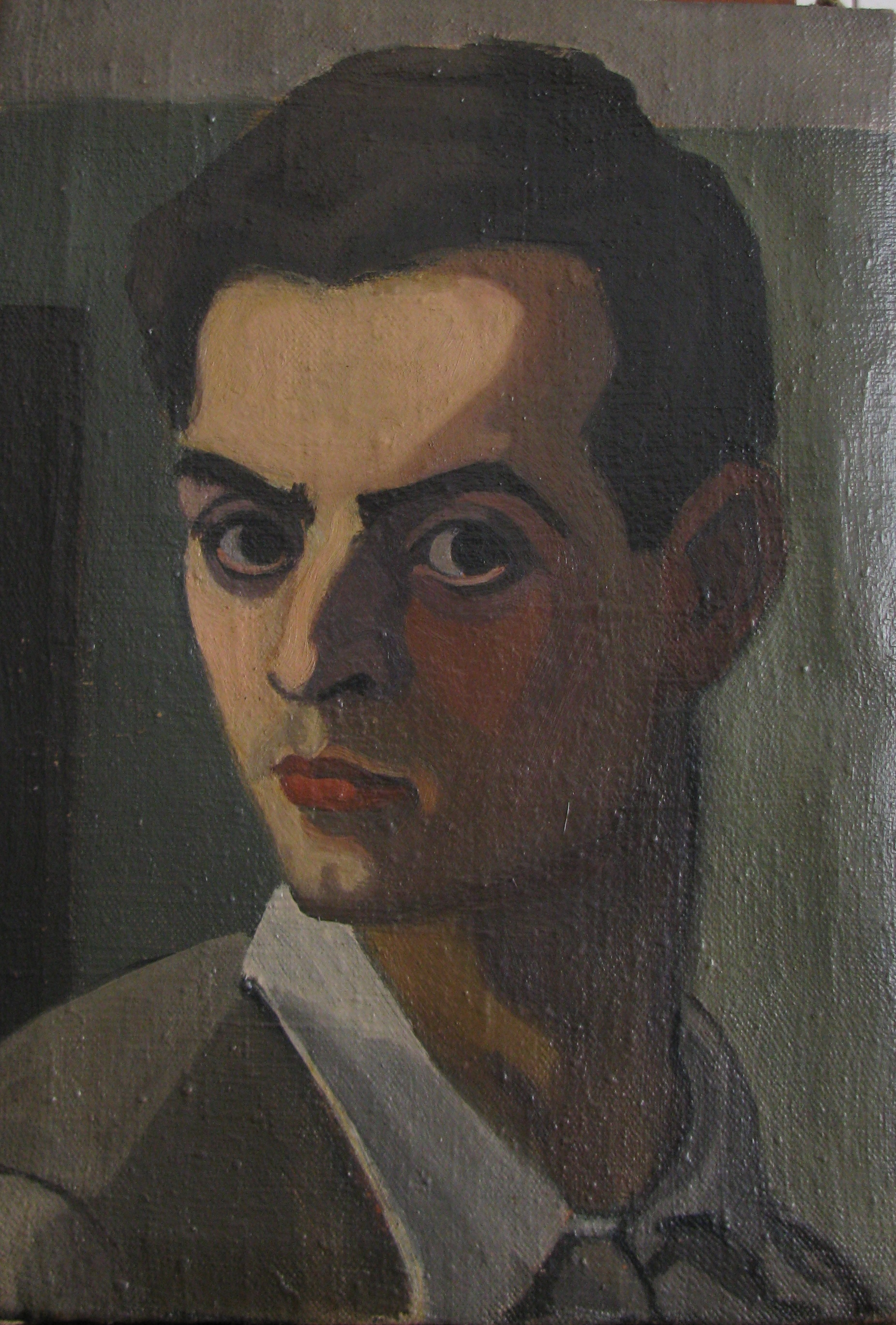
Giovanni Philippone, Self-Portrait, 1949

Giovanni Philippone (San Giovanni Gemini, Sicily, 1922 – Pavia, 1993) was an Italian painter and sculptor.

== Biography ==
Philippone obtained his high school diploma in Palermo in 1942. In 1946, at the end of World War II, he moved to Milan, where he graduated at the Academy of Fine Arts of Brera with the guidance of Aldo Carpi and art historian Eva Thea. During the same year, he won the Francesco Hayez Prize.

In 1950 he moved to Paris, where he attended the Academie des Beaux Art and studied with Leger. In Paris he met and befriended Gino Severini. In 1952 he moved back to Milan and wrote a manifesto about the diatribe between abstraction and realism championing a neutral position that would accept both methodologies as valid. It was presented on the occasion of a group exhibition at the Bergamini gallery.

Philippone's artistic ideas included experimentations with materials such as glass and ceramics and collaborations with architects such as Terzaghi and Magnaghi. He then perfected his engraving technique with his friend and fellow artist Rino Cervi.

From 1945 to 1986 he exhibited his works in numerous galleries in Italy and abroad. Philippone died in 1993.

In 2013, three permanent rooms dedicated to the work of Philippone were unveiled at the Municipal Building of the former Collegio dei Filippini in Agrigento. The rooms were inaugurated on the occasion of the exhibition organized for the twentieth anniversary of his death.

== Selected exhibitions ==
- 1945 – Accademia di Belle Arti di Palermo (Philippone, Sanfilippo, Guttuso, Attardi, Accardi)
- 1946 – Francesco Hayez Prize, Brera Academy, Milan
- 1946 – Fronte della Cultura, Rome (Birolli, Cassinari, Chighine, Migneco, Morlotti, Paganin, Philippone, Sassu, Testori, Cavaliere, Crippa, Dova, French, Kodra, Treccani and Vedova)
- 1952 – Galleria Bergamini, Milan (Chighine, Paganin, Philippone, Garau, Traverso)
- 1958 – Galleria d'Arte Selezione, Milan
- 1958 – Galleria La Maggiolina, Alessandria
- 1958 – De Gasperi Award, Palermo
- 1958 – Triennale de la Jansonne, France
- 1958 – National Museum, Bucharest (Guttuso, Mafai, Sassu, Manzù, Migneco, Philippone, Purificato, Bueno, Attardi, Treccani)
- 1960 – Galleria Il Prisma, Milan
- 1960 – Salon de l'Art libre, Palais de Beaux Art, Paris
- 1961 – Galleria Montenapoleone, Milan
- 1962 – Sicily Industry Award, Palermo
- 1964 – Burdeke Galerie, Zurich
- 1964 – Aterier Monpti, Munich
- 1965 – Galleria San Fedele, Milan
- 1965 – Galleria San Giorgio, alessandria
- 1965 – Atelier Monpti, Munich (solo show)
- 1965 – Galerie Studio 20, Munich
- 1965 – The Parthenon Award, Palermo
- 1966 – Galleria Mainieri, Milan
- 1971 – Galleria Schettini, Milan
- 1973 – Galleria Flaccovio, Palermo (solo show)
- 1974 – Municipal Library, Milan (solo show)
- 1975 – Arengario, Monza (Ronchi, Philippone)
- 1980 – Galleria Civica, Campione d'Italia (solo show)
- 1981 – Galleria Schettini, Milan
- 1984 – Galleria Schettini, Milan
- 1986 – Galleria Arteincornice, Turin
- 2008 – Palazzo Palmieri, Bari
- 2013 – Palazzo Comunale ex Convento dei Filippini, Agrigento (retrospective)

== Bibliography ==
- Gianfranco Curletti, Giovanni Philippone, Galleria d'Arte Selezione, Milan, 1958
- Giovanni Gemini, Passato e presente: acqueforti di Giovanni Philippone/fotografie di Pippo Di Grigoli, Studio Editoria Sud, Agrigento, 1987
- Enciclopedia universale della pittura moderna, Seda, Milan, 1969, p. 2128
- Leonardo Sciascia, Giovanni Philippone, Galleria Schettini, Milan, 1981
- Giovanni Philippone and Enzo Li Gregni, Passato e presente: acqueforti di Giovanni Philippone/disegni di Enzo Li Gregni, Studio Editoria Sud, Agrigento, 1987*Catalogo dell'arte moderna italiana, numero 23, Giorgio Mondadori, Milan, 1987, p. 355
- Luigi Lo Bue, I fasci siciliani (illustrations by Giovanni Philippone), Legatoria industriale siciliana, Palermo, 1990
- Mario De Micheli (ed.), Giovanni Philippone, Vangelista, Milan, 1995
- Giacomo Agosti and Matteo Ceriana, Le Raccolte Storiche dell'Accademia di Brera, Centro Di, Florence, 1997
- Enciclopedia artisti contemporanei: opere e quotazioni, S.T.M. Italia, Monza, 2009, p. 204.
