= Camilla Marazzi =

Italian artist (1885–1911)

- Born: 26 April 1885; Lugano, Switzerland
- Died: October 1911; Rome
- Occupation: Painter

Camilla Marazzi (26 April 1885 in Lugano, Switzerland – October 1911 in Rome) was an Italian artist who died at a young age.

== Biography ==
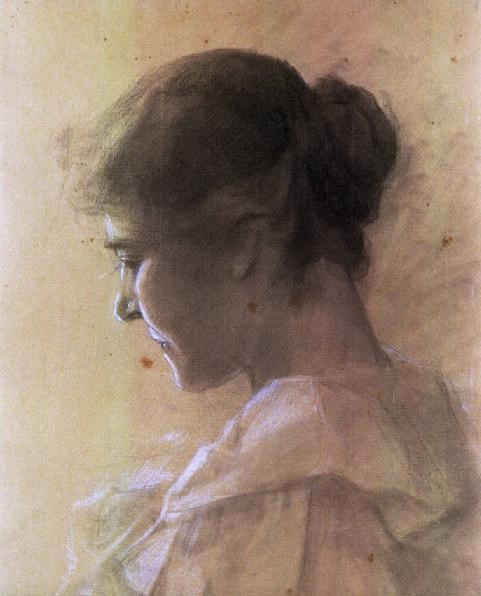
Ritratto di ragazza (Portrait of a girl), charcoal, Civic museum of Crema

Marazzi was the daughter of Antonio Marazzi, a diplomat and anthropologist. She was also the niece of Fortunato Marazzi, a soldier, writer and senator. Marazzi was born in Lugano, Switzerland, where his father was on duty. She began to paint as a child. In 1901 her talent brought her under the tutelage of Giuseppe Ferrari in his atelier in Rome. In 1905 her health began to fail and she was misdiagnosed with tuberculosis. She had complex surgery and then left Rome to recover in her family villa in Moscazzano, near Crema. Further health problems forced her to come back to Rome for additional treatment. Unfortunately, she died in surgery at the age of twenty-six.

== Artistic production ==
Her early death prevented Marazzi from reaching fame and artistic success. Nevertheless, she is now remembered as a good portraitist. Her artwork, generally charcoal, crayon and pencil portraits, vaguely symbolic-tasting, are "visions purified by the crayon technique in a tiny and lyric realism where psyche secrets run into the unfathomable mystery of faith".

The Civic Museum of Crema displays three portraits by Marazzi.

In the same location an exhibit of her artwork took place in 1972.

== Bibliography ==
- Camilla Marazzi, Crema, 1972.
- Museo civico di Crema e del Cremasco. Sezione di arte moderna e contemporanea, Crema, 1995.
- R. Bettinelli, La nostalgia illustre. Arte cremasca tra '800 e '900, Crema, 2006.
- C. Alpini, Pittori e scultori cremaschi dell'Ottocento, Crema, 2008.
