= Civic Museum of Crema =

Museum in Crema, Italy

Museo civico di Crema e del Cremasco
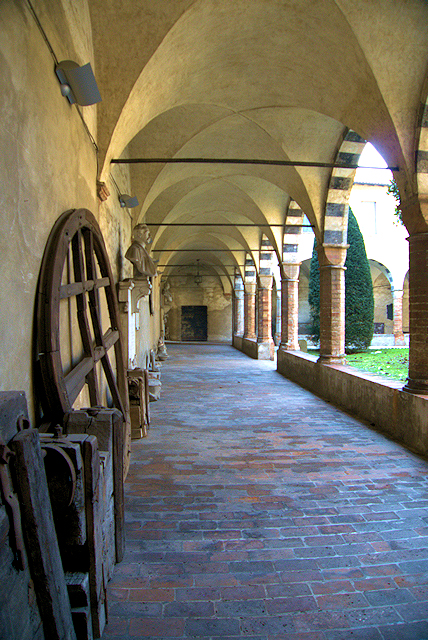
- Established: 1960; 66 years ago
- Location: Piazzetta Winifred Terni De Gregorj, 5 - Crema, Italy
- Coordinates: 45.3617°N 9.6911°E
- Website: www.comune.crema.cr.it/museo

The Civic Museum of Crema (Italian: Museo civico di Crema e del Cremasco) is an Italian museum located in Crema.

It was founded in 1960 in what had been a 15th-century Augustinian cloister. There are sections for archeology, history and art.

== The headquarters and its historical events ==
The museum is housed in the former convent of Sant'Agostino, founded in 1439 and centered around the two Renaissance cloisters. A wing of the second cloister is occupied by the large refectory painted in 1507 by the painter Pietro da Cemmo. In 1797, the Autonomous Municipality of Crema, born following the constitution of the Cisalpine Republic, suppressed the convent and turn the complex into a hospital. Soon after, it changed its destination again, becoming a barracks. In 1945 the barracks was decommissioned and the area, owned by the State, was given in use to the City of Crema, which used it temporarily as a warehouse and shelter for homeless and displaced people because of the conflict. Only in 1959 the Municipality managed to acquire the building and to start, under the direction of the architect Amos Edallo, important redevelopment works, in order to allocate the former convent to a cultural use. In addition to the new Civic Museum, the building also housed for many years the Municipal Library, now moved to the Palazzo Benzoni.

== History ==
After decades of requests from the citizens, the institution of the Museum was made official by municipal decision in 1959. The works started under the direction of Edallo, and soon led to a first provisional arrangement of the material in the meantime collected.

In May 1963 the actual inauguration took place: the museum's patrimony had been subdivided into some sections: historical, musical, artistic, but also cartographic, ceramist, numismatic, folkloristic and handicraft.

In addition to the figure of Edallo, it can be remembered in particular the involvement of Winifred Treni De Gregory and the painter Gianetto Biondini, who edited the craft section but especially the artistic one, one of the most substantial of the museum heritage. In 1965 two new sections were inaugurated: that of the Garibaldi relics and the archaeological one, made particularly rich by the discovery shortly before some Longobard tombs in the area of Offanengo.

In May 2014, the new section of modern and contemporary art was inaugurated, enlarged compared to the previous nucleus and dedicated to works of the nineteenth and twentieth centuries, selected by the art critic Cesare Alpini.

The following year was established the section of organaria art, homage to the tradition of the city of Crema in the realization of pipe organs and the first Italian museum dedicated to this theme

== Collections and organization of sections ==
=== Archeological section ===
It shows fossils and remains of animals like deer, bison and aurochs found in the area and dating back to the Paleolithic Era, but also items belonging to the Neolithic Era, to the Bronze and Iron Ages, to the Roman and medieval period.

=== Historical section ===
The historical section collects documents, memorabilia and objects of the ages from the end of the Middle Ages. Some documents testify the political and social reality of the city of Crema under the rule of the Serenissima. An important nucleus consists of documents of the 1797, year of the fall of the Republic of Venice, the constitution by Napoleon of the ephemeral Cremasca Republic and its immediate annexation to the Cisalpine Republic. Some papers from the Habsburg Era are ideally followed by a rich repertoire of memorabilia, documents and memories of the Risorgimento, witnesses of the presence in Crema of important personalities of the time, such as Enrico Martini and Vincenzo Toffetti and of the visits to the city made by Giuseppe Garibaldi in 1862 and Vittorio Emanuele II in 1859. With regard to the Great War, there are significant relics of General Fortunato Marazzi and Infantry Major Umberto Fadini, Cremaschi characters who had important roles in the conflict.

=== Artistic section ===
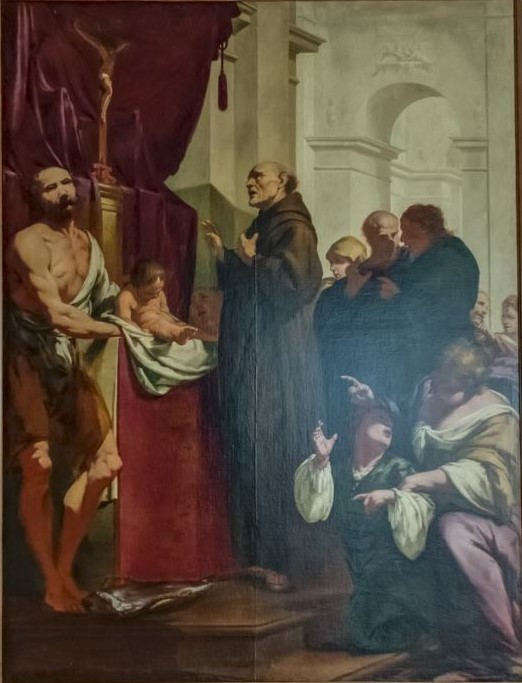
Miracle of St Peter of Alcantara by Giovanni Battista Lucini

The artistic section, mainly pictorial, collects works of art from the 16th century to the present day.

Of the oldest centuries there are works by Vincenzo Civerchio, Carlo Urbino, Gian Giacomo Barbelli, Giovanni Battista Lucini, Tommaso Pombioli (called Il Conciabricci), Tommaso and Mauro Picenardi.

A significant component of the museum's collection is the modern and contemporary art section, which includes paintings and sculptures by 19th and 20th century Cremaschi artists such as Eugenio Giuseppe Conti, Angelo Bacchetta, Camilla Marazzi, Amos Edallo, Carlo Martini, Achille Barbaro, Carlo Fayer, Gianetto Biondini and Federico Boriani.

The Museum also houses paintings by the Francesco Arata of Castelleone and Trento Longaretti of Treviso.

In addition to the cremasca artistic production, there are some paintings in the museum by other Italian and foreign authors, about subjects related to the events of Crema and some of its illustrious citizens. Particularly noteworthy are the paintings Enrico Martini, diplomat in Russia by Karl Pavlovič Bryulov and Gli ostaggi di Crema by Gaetano Previati, owned by the Brera Academy of Fine Arts and stored at the Cremasco museum. A second painting, Christ and the Apostles, is also in the museum. Cremasca is also a Portrait of Alberico Hall of Aligi Sassu.

In contrast, some paintings by Palma il Giovane, Guercino, Bronzino, Fra Galgario, Magnasco, Cignaroli and, more recently, a Portrait of a Man by Domenico Induno are unrelated to the Cremasco context.

=== Music section ===
The section bears witness to the musical tradition of Crema, the birthplace of composers such as Francesco Cavalli and Giovanni Bottesini and home of the Pacifico organ builders Inzoli and Giovanni Tamburini. Linked to the musical tradition is the scenographic one: the Civic Museum in fact preserves numerous sketches and cartoons of the cremaschi Luigi Manini and Antonio Rovescalli, painters and scenographers of the Teatro alla Scala in Milan.

This section was recently dismantled to make way for the new staging of the Art Section.

== See also ==
- List of museums in Province of Cremona
- List of music museums

== Bibliography ==
- A. Pavesi, Guida al Museo civico di Crema e del Cremasco, Crema, 1994.
- Antonio Pavesi, Guida al Museo civico di Crema e del Cremasco, Crema, 1994.
- Silvia Merico e Carlo Bruschieri, Crema, Claudio Madoglio Editore, 2003.
- Museo civico di Crema e del Cremasco. Sezione di arte moderna e contemporanea, Crema, 1995.
- G. Cervi, Cremona e provincia, Touring Club Italiano, 2007.
