= List of museums in Province of Cremona =

This is a list of museums in the Province of Cremona, Lombardy Region, Italy.

== Museums and ecomuseums ==
Name	Image	Location	City	Province	Network	Area of study	Summary
Civic Museum of Crema		Piazzetta Winifred Terni De Gregorj, 5	Crema	Cremona		Archeology, history, music, painting and sculpture	
Museo della Stampa			Soncino	Cremona	Arte, cultura, storia fra Serio e Oglio		
Museo Archeologico Aquaria			Soncino	Cremona	Arte, cultura, storia fra Serio e Oglio	Archeology	
Museo della Civiltà Contadina			Offanengo	Cremona	Arte, cultura, storia fra Serio e Oglio	Ethnography	
Museo Civico Ala Ponzone			Cremona	Cremona	Sistema museale della città di Cremona		
Museo Stradivariano			Cremona	Cremona	Sistema museale della città di Cremona		
Museo Civico di Storia Naturale			Cremona	Cremona	Sistema museale della città di Cremona		
Museo della Civiltà Contadina			Cremona	Cremona	Sistema museale della città di Cremona	Ethnography	
Museo Archeologico			Cremona	Cremona	Sistema museale della città di Cremona	Archeology	
Fondazione Città di Cremona			Cremona	Cremona	Sistema museale della città di Cremona		
Fondazione A. Stradivari Cremona - La Triennale Scuola di Liuteria			Cremona	Cremona	Sistema museale della città di Cremona		
Museo Civico Ala Ponzone			Cremona	Cremona	Network of archeological museums of the provinces of Brescia, Cremona and Mantua	Archeology	
Museo Civico di Crema e del Cremasco			Crema	Cremona	Network of archeological museums of the provinces of Brescia, Cremona and Mantua	Archeology	
Museo Civico Archeologico			Castelleone	Cremona	Network of archeological museums of the provinces of Brescia, Cremona and Mantua	Archeology	
Civico Museo Archeologico Platina			Piadena	Cremona	Network of archeological museums of the provinces of Brescia, Cremona and Mantua	Archeology	
