= Carlo Martini =

Italian painter and academician

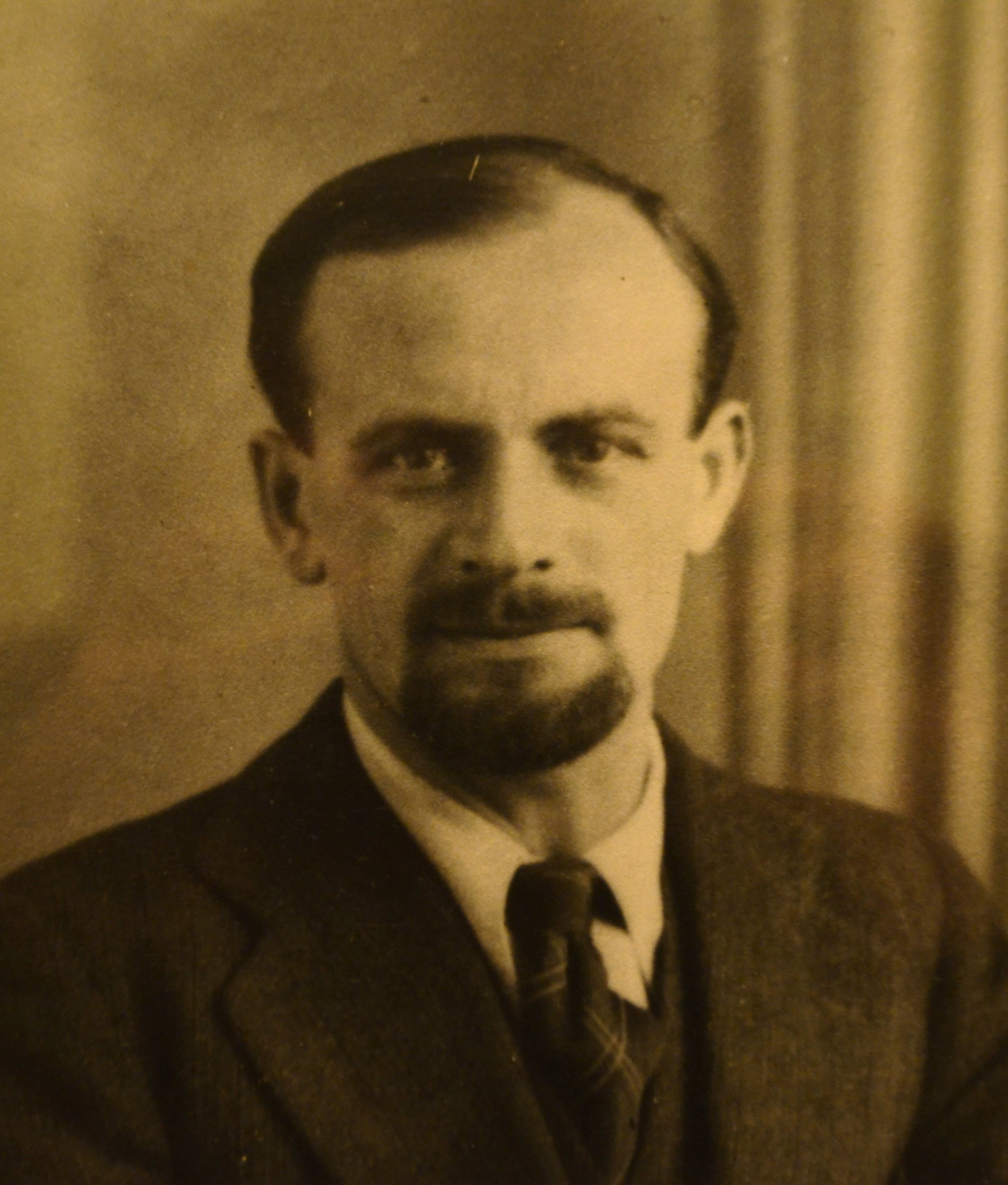
- Born: 25 February 1908; Crema, Kingdom of Italy
- Died: 15 July 1958; Miazzina, Italy
- Education: Brera Academy
- Occupation: Painter

Carlo Martini (25 February 1908 – 15 July 1958) was an Italian painter and academician.

== Biography ==
Martini was born in Crema, Italy. He studied in Brera Academy of Milan under the tutelage of Aldo Carpi. He moved to England in 1938. He lived in London and Glasgow. He came back in Italy in 1940 due to the Second World War. He fought in France and he got imprisoned in Monza in 1943, bound to a German concentration camp, but he managed to escape and run away from Italy to Switzerland as a refugee. At the end of the conflict he returned to Milan, where he became assistant professor of Aldo Carpi at Brera Academy. He died in 1958, at the age of fifty.

== Artistic style ==
During his academic growth, Martini's style was influenced by Novecento Italiano, and then by Chiarismo Lombardo movement. The English period (1938–1940) gave him the possibility to assimilate the Impressionistic lesson and the art of painters as William Turner and John Constable. Several paintings of that period represent the English and Scottish countryside. The artistic maturity brought new pictorial trials, where children and Italian landscapes carved out a leading role in his canvases, showing the artist's love and attachment for his daily inner life.

== Exhibits ==
Martini participated in the Venice Biennale in 1934, 1936, 1948 and 1950. Among the posthumous exhibits, the most notable took place in Crema in 1991.

== Paintings in museums and public collections ==
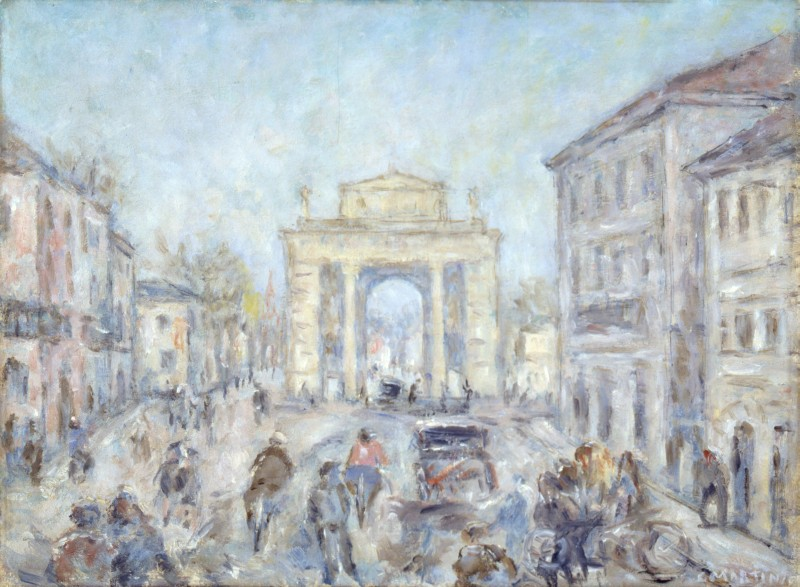
La città di Crema, 1950, Art collections of Fondazione Cariplo

Several Martini's paintings are kept in Milan, in the Modern Art Gallery, in the Brera Academy collection, in the Art collections of Fondazione Cariplo, in the Ospedale Maggiore portraits collection and in the province of Milan art collections.

In Crema, some canvas are exhibited in the Civic Museum.

== Bibliography ==
- G. C. Bascapè - E. Spinelli, Le raccolte d'arte dell'Ospedale Maggiore di Milano dal XV al XX secolo, Silvana editoriale, 1956.
- A. M. Comanducci, Dizionario illustrato dei pittori, disegnatori e incisori italiani moderni e contemporanei, volume III, Patuzzi, 1972.
- L. Caramel - C. Pirovano, Galleria d'arte moderna. Opere del Novecento, Electa, 1974.
- A. Sala, Carlo Martini, Leonardo - De Luca editori, 1991.
- Il Novecento a Palazzo Isimbardi, Fabbri Editori, 1988.
- E. Muletti, Carlo Martini (1908-1958). La memoria del paesaggio cremasco, 2008.
