= Angelo Bacchetta =

Italian painter

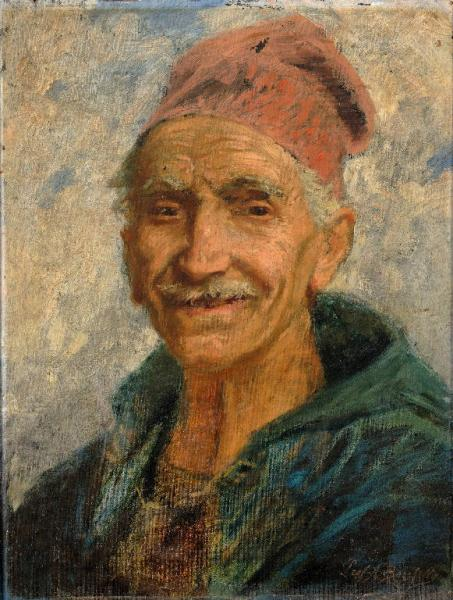
- Angelo Bacchetta, Selfportrait
- Born: 12 March 1841; Crema, Austrian Empire
- Died: 12 November 1920; Crema
- Education: Brera Academy
- Occupation: Painter

Angelo Bacchetta (1841–1920) was an Italian painter.

== Biography ==
He studied at the Brera Academy, where he made friends with Filippo Carcano, under the tutelage of Francesco Hayez. After leaving the academy prematurely, he moved to Florence (1866–1868), where he was influenced by the recent innovations from the Macchiaioli movement. In 1867 he took part in the International Exposition of Paris.

After the death of the King Vittorio Emanuele II, he created an album containing epigraphs about Italian cities and towns, which was offered to the successor Umberto I, who conferred him the degree of Knight of the Order of the Crown of Italy. In 1885, he moved to Portugal: due to some appreciated works, he was decorated by the government with the honour of Knight of the Order of Christ. He returned to Portugal the following year, and he painted the portraits of the members of the royal family and of Luciano de Castro, who had just become President of the Council of Ministers. Then he moved back to Crema, where he remained for the rest of his life, set up the only personal exposition in his career, and became, with Eugenio Giuseppe Conti, Crema's most appreciated portrait painter of the nineteenth century. Bacchetta was influenced by the style introduced in Crema some decades earlier by Pietro Racchetti, considered the town's first specialised portrait painter.

Angelo Bacchetta was the forefather of a family of painters: his son Azelio (1870–1907), his nephews Tullio (1892–1974) and Ugo (1930–2005). His sister, Teresa, married Luigi Manini, a well-known painter, set designer and architect, who, like Bacchetta, was born in Crema and worked in Portugal; furthermore, his son Azelio married in turn Manini's daughter, Ebe.

== Notable works ==
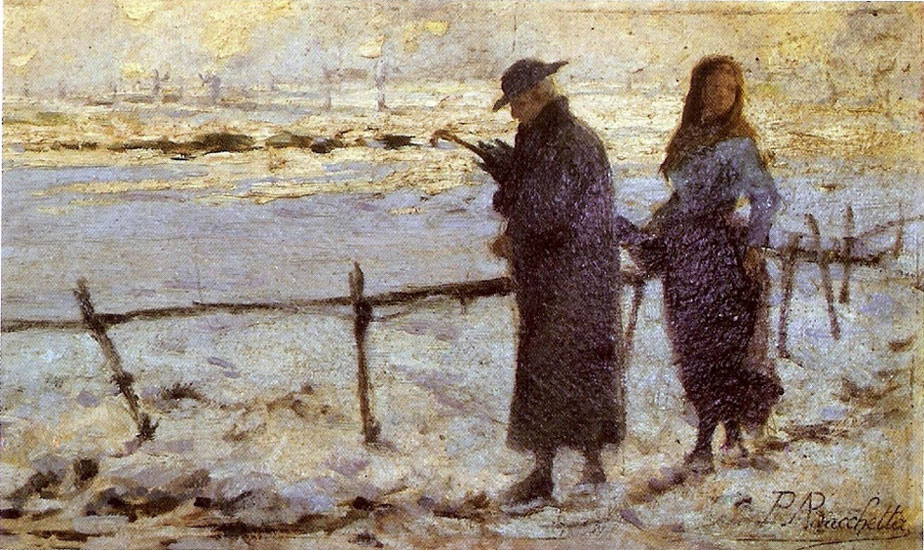
Winter landscape with figures (Civic Museum of Crema)

In the area of Crema, Bacchetta left paintings and frescos in several churches: among them, the Sanctuary of Santa Maria della Croce.

Several of Bacchetta's paintings and drawings are in the Civic Museum of Crema.
