= Aldo Carpi =

Italian painter

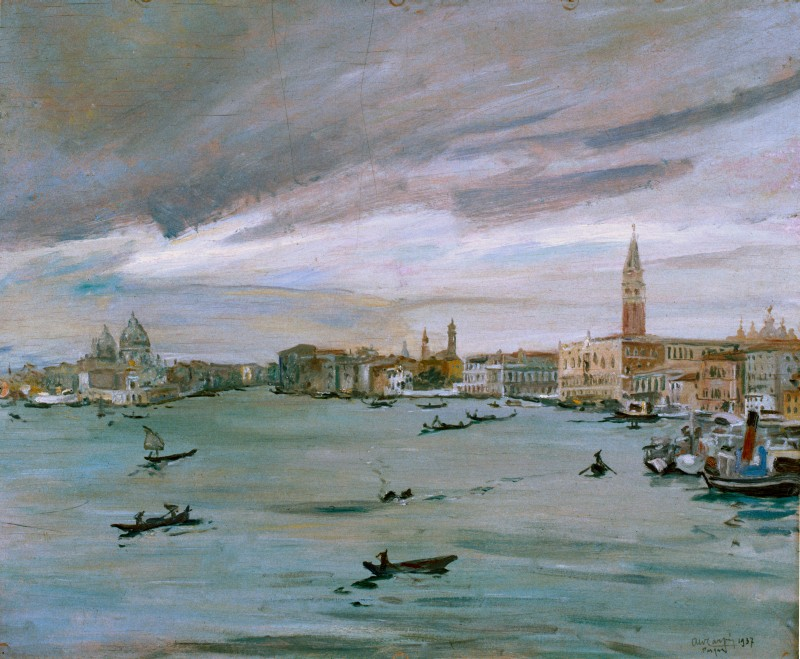
Il bacino di San Marco a Venezia, 1937 (Fondazione Cariplo)

Aldo Carpi (6 October 1886 – 27 March 1973) was an Italian artist, painter and writer, author of a collection of memoirs concerning his imprisonment in the infamous Mauthausen concentration camp.

== Biography ==
Born in Milan, Italy, early in his youth he started studying fine arts under the tutelage of Stefano Bersani. In 1906 he joined the Brera Academy, where he met some of the most renowned Italian painters of the time, including Giuseppe Mentessi, Carlo Cattaneo, Cesare Tallone, as well as Achille Funi, Emilio Gola and Carlo Carrà. The following year he showed his work at a Brera art exhibition, which was followed by an invitation to the 1912 Venice Biennale. Since then he participated in every edition of the Venice Biennale up until his death, with the exception of those held in 1940, 1950 and 1952.

Drafted into the Italian Army in 1915, he served at various fronts of the Great War. In 1917 he married Maria Arpesani, whom he had a son, Pinin Carpi, with on the 11th of July 1920. In the 1920s, Carpi developed the style of his paintings and landscapes under the influence of Italian 19th-century painters. For his works in 1925 he was awarded with the prestigious Premio Principe Umberto. In 1927 he became the author of new frescoes in the San Simpliciano Basilica in Milan.

In 1930 he became the professor and deacon of the faculty of painting at his alma mater, where he would teach young painters including Bruno Cassinari, Carlo Martini and Trento Longaretti.

In 1934 he also prepared a project for the new stained glass windows in the Duomo of Milan, which was not completed until after World War II. In 1937 his work was featured at the Exposition Internationale des Arts et Techniques dans la Vie Moderne in Paris, where he was awarded a bronze medal. The piece is now in the collection of the Museo Cantonale d'Arte in Lugano.

In January 1944, during World War II, he was arrested after a colleague informed the Nazis of his partisan activities. He was imprisoned in the Gusen I concentration camp of the Mauthausen-Gusen complex, where he kept a diary and made a number of sketches portraying life and death in the camp. Carpi was liberated at the end of the war. He returned to Milan, where in 1956 he was awarded the state prize for his works and cultural merits. He also became the Dean of the Brera Academy. In 1972 he had a large retrospective of his works.

He died in 1973 in Milan.

== Exhibitions ==
- "Mostre d'arte in risaia", Mortara, 1936 and 1938, curated by Carlo Ercole Accetti.
