= Magnasco =

Magnasco is a surname. Notable people with the surname include:

- Alessandro Magnasco (1667–1749), Italian Baroque painter
- Marcelo Magnasco (born 1958), Argentine fencer
- Marcelo Osvaldo Magnasco (born 1963), Argentine biophysicist
- Stefano Magnasco (born 1992), Chilean footballer
