= Crema Cathedral =

Cathedral located in Crema, Italy

Coordinates: 45°21′48″N 9°41′15″E

- Cathedral of Santa Maria Assunta
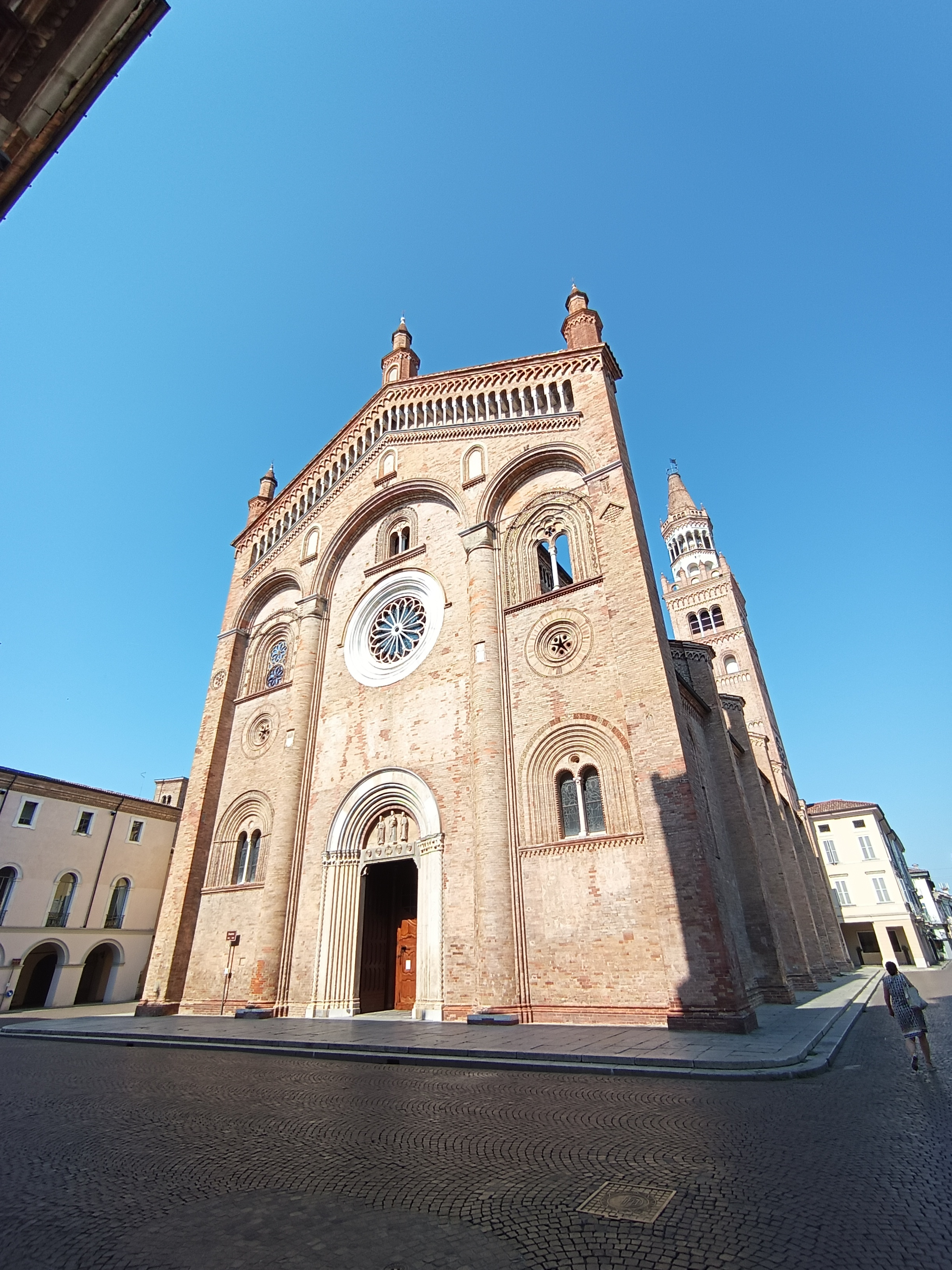
- The facade
- Crema Cathedral
- Location: Crema
- Address: Piazza del Duomo
- Country: Italy
- Denomination: Roman Catholic; Roman Rite

History
- Dedication: Mary Assumed
- Consecrated: 1585

Architecture
- Style: Romanesque and Lombard Gothic
- Groundbreaking: 1284
- Completed: 1341

Administration
- Diocese: Diocese of Crema

The Crema Cathedral (Italian: Duomo di Crema, Cattedrale di Santa Maria Assunta), is the main and oldest place of worship of the Catholic faith in the city of Crema, serving as the episcopal seat of the Diocese of Crema.

== History ==
=== Before the year 1000 ===
Determining any construction history before the year 1000 is impossible due to the absence of historical documents. Artifacts of Roman origin uncovered during the restorations from 1952 to 1959 only suggest the possibility of an ancient pagan temple on the same site. According to tradition, a small church dedicated to Santa Maria della Mosa existed in the area where Crema was founded, dating back to early Christian times. While this cannot be verified, it is highly plausible: the site is located on a ridge, historically protected to the north and south by natural watercourses (later known as Roggia Crema, Roggia Rino, Cresmiero, or Travacone), which drained the marshland of Moso surrounding it to the northwest. To the east, the terrain descended toward the branches of the Serio. This defensible location was ideal for sheltering the refugees from the city of Parasso (Palazzo Pignano) fleeing the Lombard invasion. Whether a village already existed around the church or was established by these refugees cannot be confirmed.

Other historians propose an alternative hypothesis: Crema may have resulted from a planned expansion and settlement effort to attract individuals from various social classes, particularly from the Milanese area, offering improved social status. Evidence includes significant migratory flows in Lombardy during the 11th century, exceeding typical population movements of the time, possibly driven by a political decision of the Commune of Milan, and the late documentation of the city.

=== The cathedral of the 11th century ===
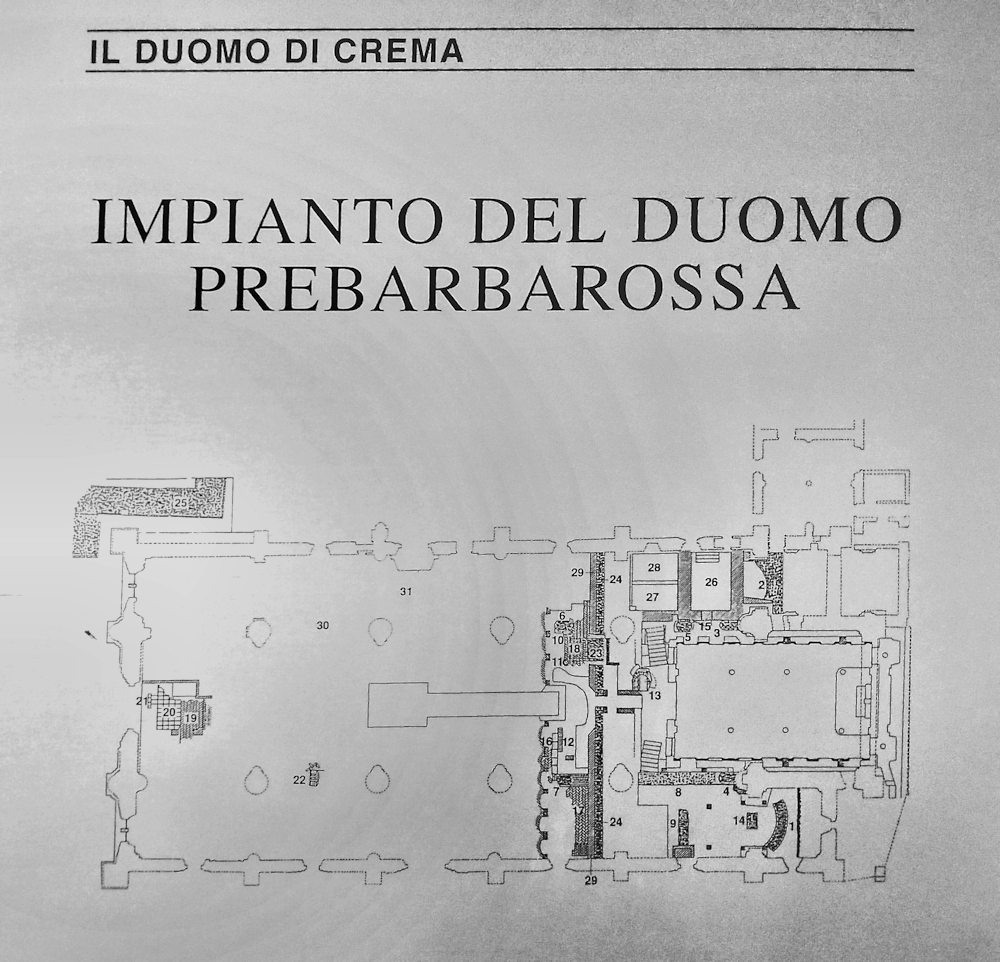
Layout of the pre-Barbarossa cathedral (detail from the synoptic panel located in the crypt)

In the 11th century, a large church, nearly identical in size to the current structure, existed, with its remains traceable beneath the floor of the present building. It is mentioned in two documents from 1098 and 1143 as Ecclesia Sancte Mariae, featuring three naves with composite pillars ending in three semicircular apses. It is probable that, as with the majority of churches of this period, it had a taller central nave with exposed trusses and side naves with groin vaults.

Beneath the base of the bell tower, however, lie the remains of a small altar with a base sinking 40 cm below the floor of the ancient cathedral. Traces of a fresco depicting the lower extremities of three figures, painted in an archaic style, possibly predating this Romanesque church, are found there.

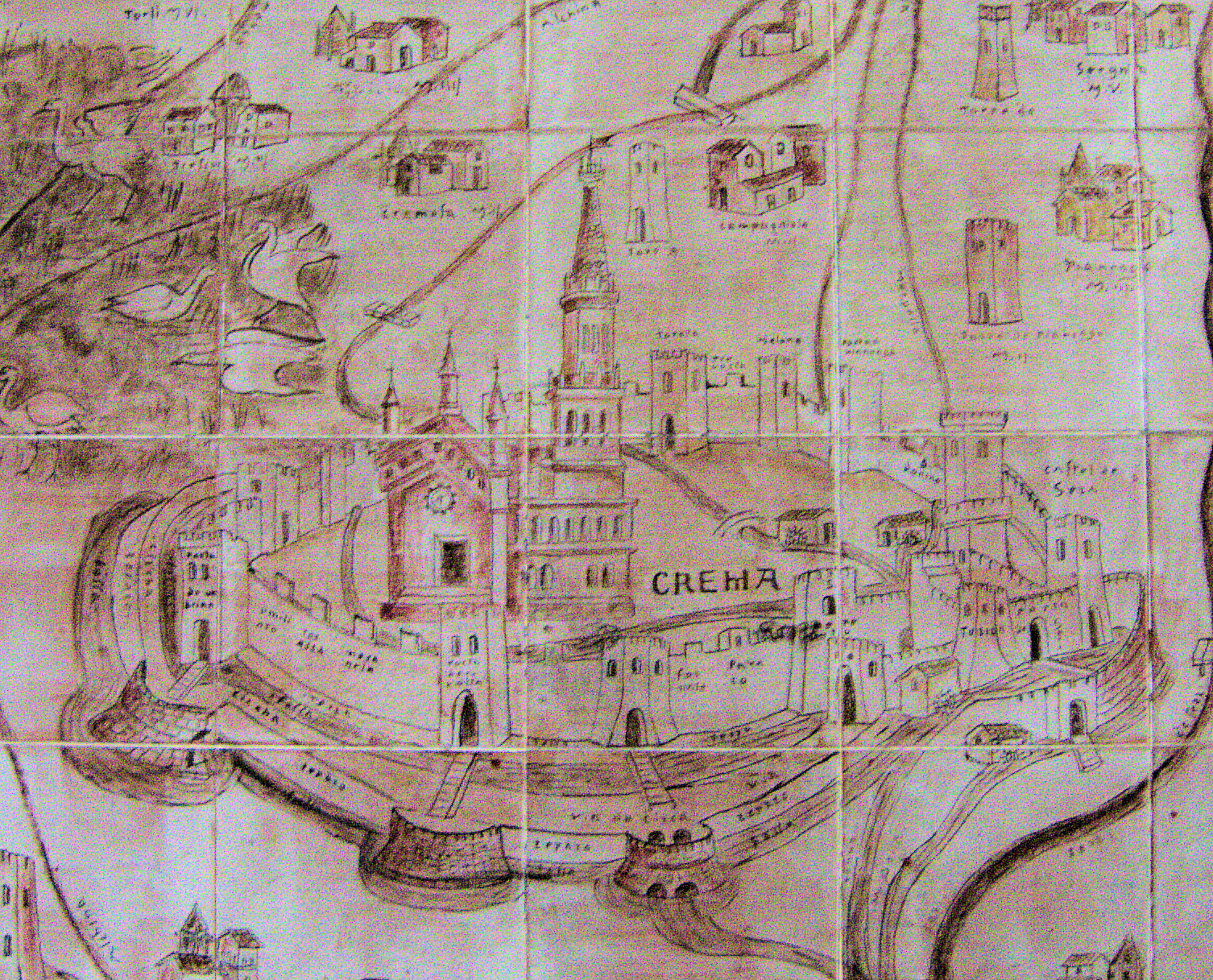
Crema Civic Museum, detail of the city with the cathedral at the center (ceramic reproduction of the Desegno de Crema et del Cremascho, the oldest map of the Crema area, dating to the 15th century)

=== From 1185 to 1341 ===
Following the historic siege of 1159–1160, much of the Romanesque cathedral was destroyed. Reconstruction was initiated by Frederick Barbarossa on May 7, 1185, focusing on the apse area, the triumphal arch, and the new sacristy.

The previous structure's portal, some sections of the masonry, and several internal pillars were incorporated.

At that time, the fortified center was under the jurisdiction of the bishop of Piacenza, but in 1212, it passed to the Diocese of Cremona, which halted funding, interrupting the works. Reconstruction resumed in 1284 upon returning to the Diocese of Piacenza.

The construction of the new church spanned 57 years, with numerous interruptions due to wars between the Guelphs and Ghibellines.

Between the 12th and 13th century, the bell tower was erected on the southern apse, later serving as a watchtower under the brief local rule of the Benzoni and the dominion of the Republic of Venice.

=== From 1341 to 1580 ===
In 1410, the ancient church of San Giovanni, attached to the northern side of the cathedral and surviving the destruction of the Romanesque church, was demolished. It had also served as a baptistery. By a bull of Pope Pius II in 1459, the provostship was transferred from Palazzo Pignano to Crema, necessitating the expansion of the choir.

During the 15th century, an altar dedicated to Saint Ambrose was established, later rededicated to Saint Mark in 1456, seven years after Crema's transition to Venetian rule. On this occasion, the miraculous Crucifix was relocated, replaced by a terracotta ancona by Agostino De Fondulis, now lost. Another altar, dedicated to Saint Sebastian, was added in 1456 by decision of the General Council.

Between the 1400s and 1500s, the crypt was excavated, raising the level of the presbytery. In 1520, the altar of the Madonna della Misericordia was established, and in 1522, the organ was rebuilt by Gian Battista Facchetti, replacing one from 1477.

In 1578, one of the facade's apical pinnacles collapsed, killing the sacristan, leading to their demolition.

In 1580, Pope Gregory XIII elevated Crema to a diocesan seat, making the cathedral the episcopal seat. Until then, the cathedral and other city parishes were under the Diocese of Piacenza, which had jurisdiction over about twenty parishes around Crema (an enclave in Lombard territory, far from Piacenza). The parish of San Pietro, within the city walls, was part of the Diocese of Cremona, which controlled other parishes in the Crema area, while a few parishes near the Lodi border belonged to the Diocese of Lodi until the establishment of the Diocese of Crema.

=== From 1580 to the 18th-century renovations ===
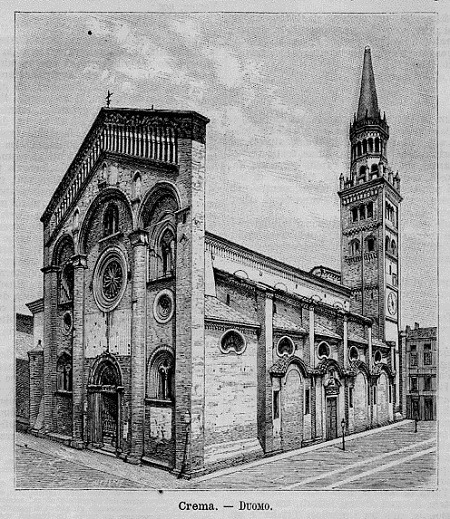
The cathedral in 1891, without pinnacles, with the southern wall altered by 17th-century chapels and peculiar "bean-shaped" windows

A new organ was installed on the counterfacade in 1647.

In 1709, the left apse chapel was expanded and fitted with a small dome, designed by Giacomo Avanzini and decorated by Giacomo Parravicini, known as il Gianolo, with assistance from the Grandi brothers. The miraculous Crucifix was permanently placed there.

Between 1776 and 1780, the interior underwent a radical transformation, as was common in many medieval churches. The simplicity of the Lombard Gothic style was out of favor, and architect Giacomo Zaninelli, collaborating with Barnabite architect Ermenegildo Pini and decorator Orlando Bencetti from Treviglio, redesigned the interior in Baroque forms. Interventions included raising the floor, adding plinths to reduce the height of the semi-columns, removing stone capitals, breaking the right perimeter wall to install new altars, and opening "bean-shaped" windows. The 14th- and 15th-century frescoes were destroyed, and the recently redecorated Crucifix chapel was refurbished.

=== From 1780 to the present ===
In 1802, the bell tower was repaired following damage from the Soncino earthquake, including the replacement of the 16 twin columns at the bell level. Further works on the bell tower occurred in 1832, 1863 (with the installation of a lightning rod), and 1877.

By the late 19th century, discussions began about removing the Baroque additions. Architect Luca Beltrami was consulted, but no action was taken.

Between 1913 and 1916, under the direction of architect Cecilio Arpesani and engineer Emilio Gussalli, the facade was restored, replacing some columns and terracotta elements and reinstating the three apical pinnacles. In 1935, a wing of the episcopal palace attached to the church, built in 1587, was demolished.

Extensive works from 1952 to 1958 aimed to remove the 18th-century additions, led by architect Amos Edallo with Corrado Verga's collaboration. The approach balanced conservative restoration and stylistic reconstruction, addressing discoveries as they emerged. For instance, debates about whether the ancient apses were semicircular or flat were resolved when flat foundations were found, leading to a flat apse reconstruction. Ancient bricks from the project or handmade replicas by artisan Emilio Iacchetti from Castelleone, using Ombriano clay to match the original color, were used.

The "bean-shaped" windows were removed, and single-light windows restored; the crypt's vault was lowered and rebuilt in reinforced concrete; the presbytery was clad in Carrara marble, and a new altar in Candoglia marble was installed. The pavement was restored to its 15th- or 16th century opus signinum style, with some sections remade in the same technique.

The official inauguration occurred on April 26, 1959, attended by the Cardinal of Milan, Giovanni Battista Montini (later Pope Paul VI).

In 1979, adjustments were made to comply with the Second Vatican Council directives, including a new altar by Mario Toffetti.

Between 1983 and 1984, the bell tower was restored under a project by architects Ermentini.

The cathedral received a notable visit in 1992 from Pope John Paul II. This event is commemorated by an inscription on a plaque on the first right bay's wall:

On June 20, 1992
His Holiness John Paul II
made a pastoral visit to Crema
joyfully welcomed by our people
in the cathedral, the heart of the Crema Church
he met the sick and witnesses
of the Gospel of Charity
here he reminded all of the Cross
Charity and Mission
lead mankind to the mystery of Christ
in memory of an unforgettable
event of faith and grace
Libero Tresoldi
Bishop of Crema

Between 2004 and 2005, a new chapel was established behind the ancient crypt to house the tombs of bishops buried there, commissioned by Monsignor Angelo Paravisi, who did not see its completion, and inaugurated on September 2, 2005.

A comprehensive conservative restoration was undertaken from 2010 to 2014.

== Exterior ==
=== Facade ===
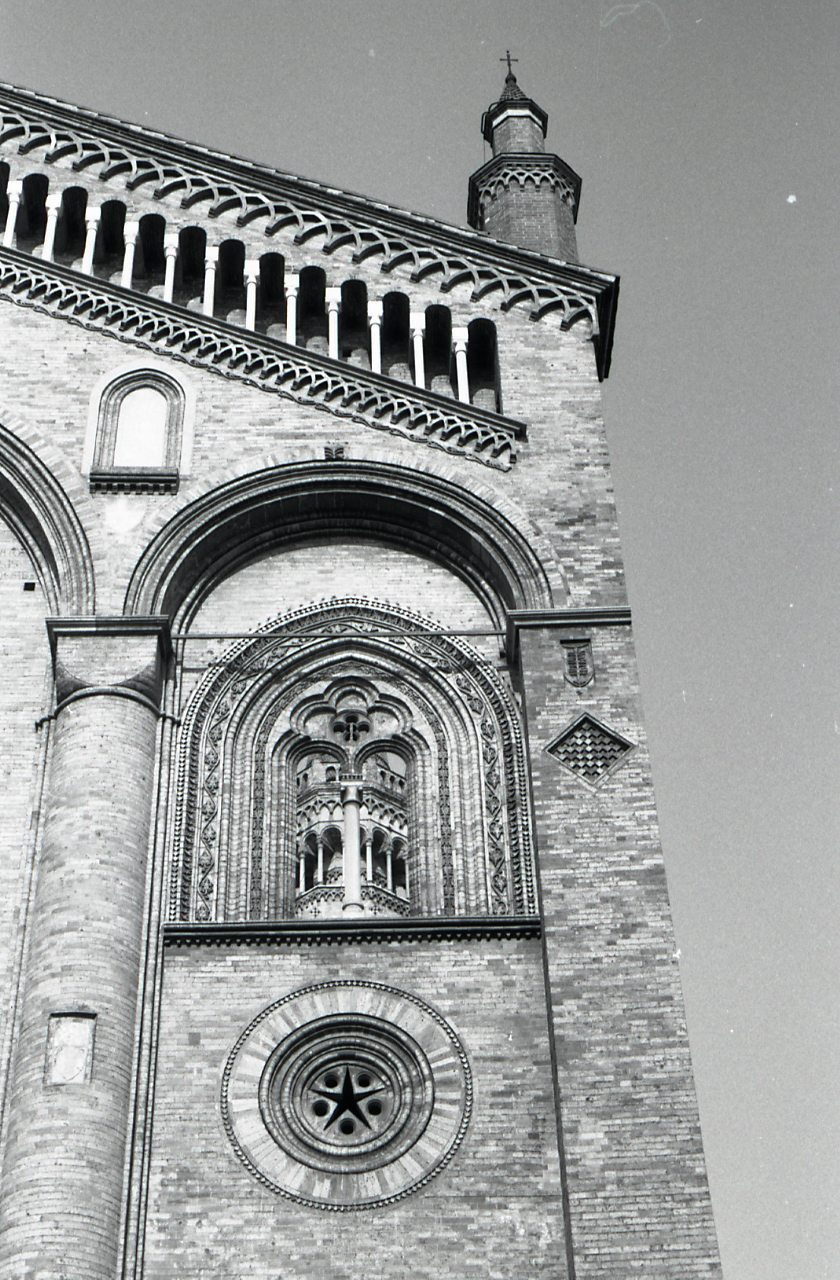
Detail of the right bifora

The gable facade is divided by large round arches in Romanesque style, as are the portal with a ribbed archivolt, the capitals with plant motifs, and the cusped decorative loggia with thirty-three marble columns. The central rose window in Saltrio stone, with sixteen radiating columns interwoven with round arches, is distinctly Gothic.

The architrave at the entrance, supported by two telamons symbolizing the burden of sin, features five clipei. The lunette contains the sculptural group of the Madonna with Child Jesus between Saints John the Baptist and Pantaleon. The interpretation of the clipei is uncertain: the central one likely represents the Paschal Lamb of the Apocalypse, while the lateral ones may depict the clergy, the monk, the bishop, and the layman. On the arcosolium, a barely legible 16th-century inscription reads:

O most holy Mother, to whoever invokes you with a devout heart, be the guardian, hope, way, life, and salvation

— TE CUICUMQUE PIO MATER SANCTISSIMA CORDE INVOCAT ES CUSTOS SPES VIA VITA SALUS

The facade's numerous decorative elements inspire profound spiritual allegories, representing the ascent of the sinful soul toward salvation. Their numerical symbolism follows medieval conventions: the three spires signify perfection and the Trinity, the thirty-three columns of the loggia refer to the years lived by Jesus, and the sixteen columns of the rose window may represent the twelve apostles and the four evangelists or the four prophets of the Old Testament. According to Armando Rossi, like many sixteen-part rose windows, Crema's is visibly divided into eight "petals," symbolizing intercession and regeneration, with eight being the quintessential Marian number due to Mary's role as mediator.

Other symbolic elements include a square stone under the left bifora, indicating undifferentiated raw material as the starting point for human and Christian salvation; pentacles, stylized representations of a man with outstretched arms and legs, symbolizing the perfect man, Christ; vine tendrils and leaves framing the windows, representing the Eucharist and Christ; a tile on the left buttress with seven circles, denoting the seven planets known at the time; and on the right buttress, a checkered diamond symbolizing life's ambiguity or ambivalence, surmounted by a palm, signifying Christ's victory.

Two plaques on the semi-columns mark the construction progress made in 1301 and 1305.

The first reads:

1301 in the time
of the noble lord
Arnolfo di Fis-
siraga di Turro
podestà of Crema

— MCCCI: TPR
NOBILLIS VIRI DNI
ARNULFI DE FI
XIRAGA: TURRI
POTATIS CRIME

and is accompanied by a coat of arms with a band surmounted by four turrets.

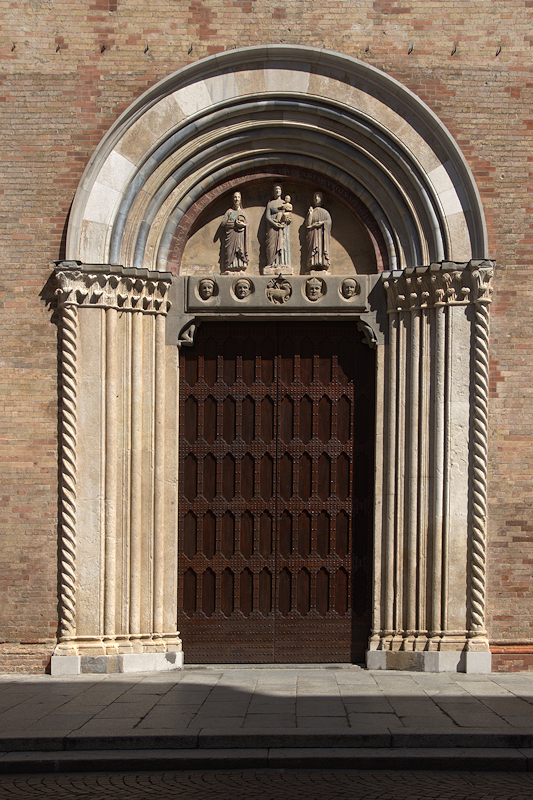
The portal

The second:

1305 in the time
of the noble lord
Oliviero De
Lature di Tono
podestà of Crema

— MCCCV: TPR
NOBILLIS VIRI
DNI OLIVERII D'
LATURE: TONO
POTIS CRIME

with a coat of arms featuring vertical stripes with a serpent and three towers.

The masonry takes on a slightly different color between the portal and the rose window. This is where faint traces remain of a fresco depicting Saint Ambrose, which was commissioned by the podestà Salio di Landriano in 1345. The accompanying inscription, still legible in the early 1900s and transcribed by priest Augusto Cambié, has since disappeared:

1345 around September and October
the above paintings were made
during the regime of the noble lord Salio di Landriano
citizen of Milan, honorable podestà of Crema under the magnificent and exalted
lords Giovanni, by the grace of God and the Apostolic See, archbishop of the holy Milanese
Church, and Luchino, Visconti brothers of Milan
of Crema

— MCCCXLV DE MEN SPT 7 OCT
SUPRASCRIPTE PICTURE FACTE FUERUNT
TPRE REGIS NOBILIS VIRI DNI SALII DE LANDRIANO
CIVIS MLI HONOR POTIS CRE MAGNIFICUS ET EXCELSIS
DNIS IOHANNE DEI ET APLICE SEDIS GRA SCE MEDIOLANENSIS
ECLE ARCHIEPO 7 LUCHINO FRATRIBUS VICECOMITIBUS MLI
CREME 7 Q GODE I BUS

Other frescoes once adorned the facade: during the 2011 cleaning and restoration, fragments of a figure depicting a canonized pope, with parts of the face, mitre, and halo, were discovered in one of the blind windows.

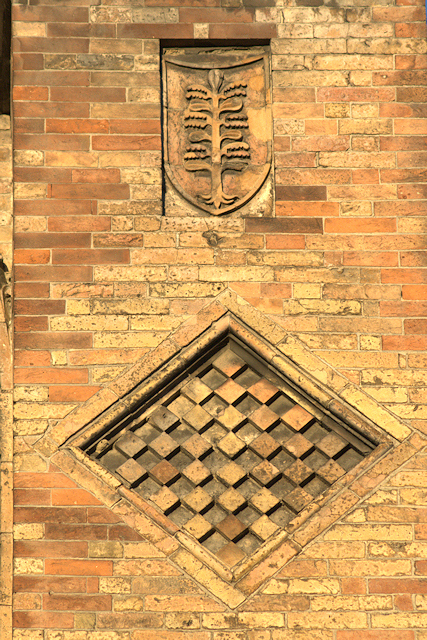
Detail of the checkered tile and palm

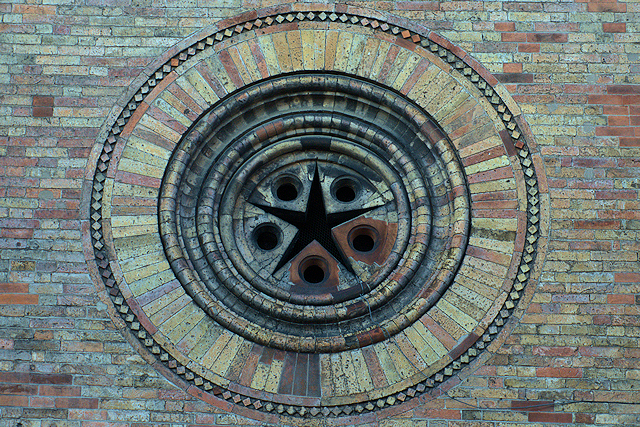
One of the two pentacles

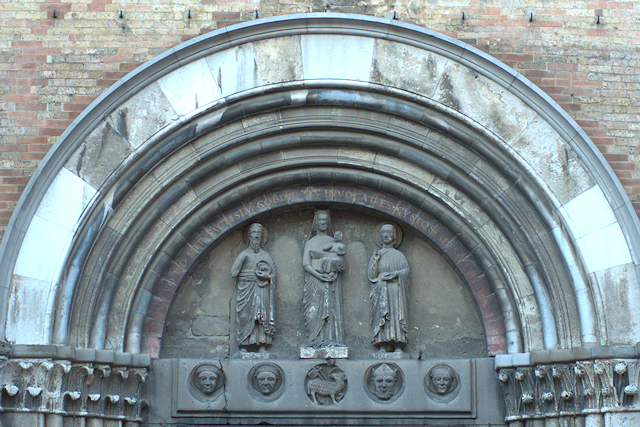
Detail of the portal

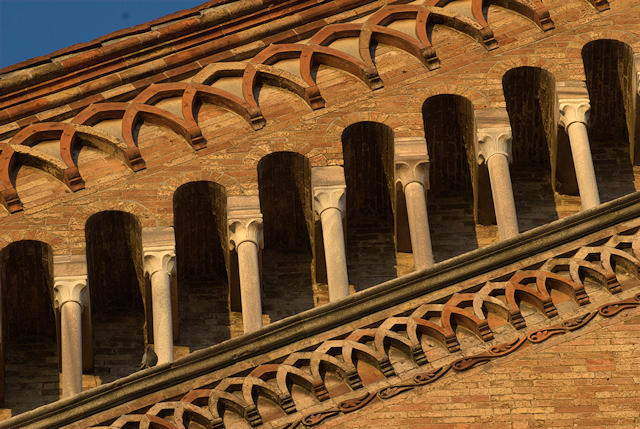
Detail of the upper loggia
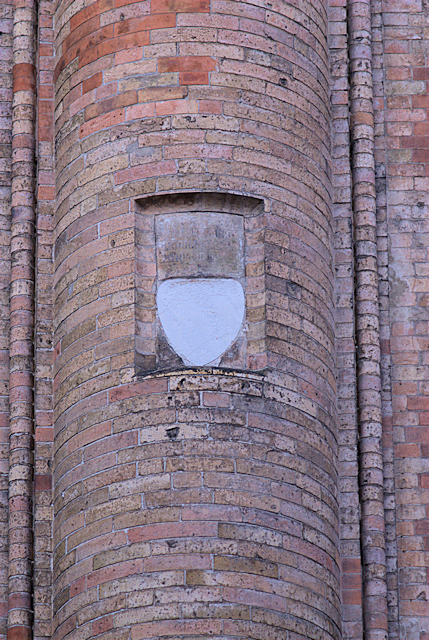
One of the two 14th-century plaques on the semi-columns

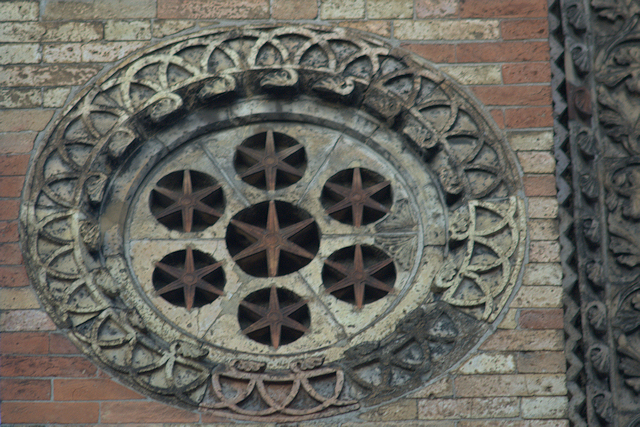
Tile on the buttress

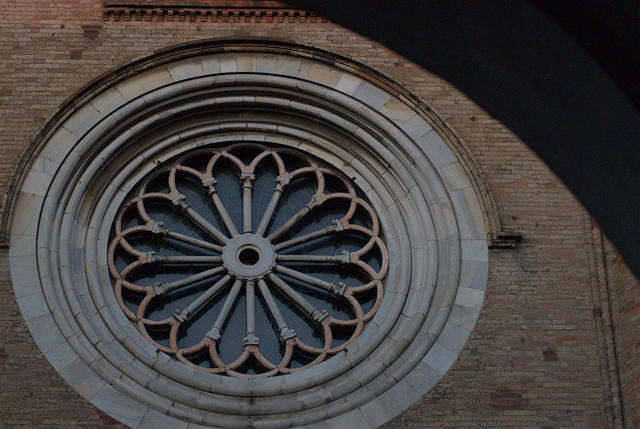
The rose window

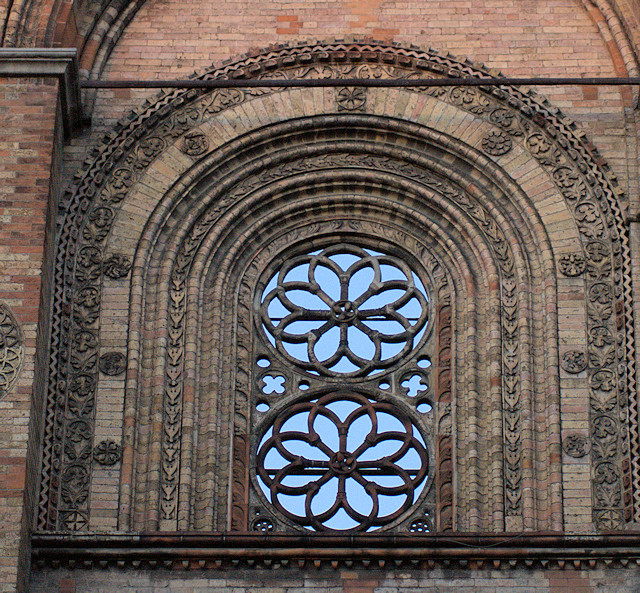
The left window

=== Sides ===
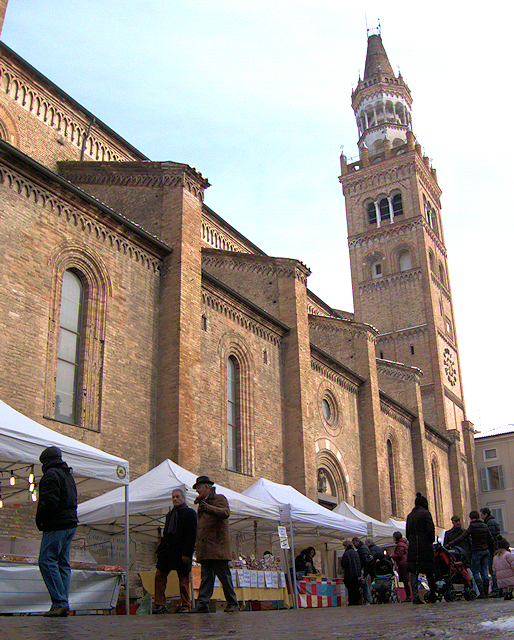
Southern side

The sides look the way they did when they were restored in the mid-20th century.

Four buttresses divide the southern wall into five bays for the central nave (with biforas illuminating the interior) and the side nave. The side nave has long monoforas, except in the third bay, where a 14th-century lateral portal is located, misaligned with the small rose window above it. The portal's lunette features a sculpture called the Madòna dal Póm (Madonna of the Pomegranate), as she holds the Child Jesus with her left arm and offers a pomegranate, symbolizing fertility and knowledge, with her right hand. The second bay includes two faces on twisted columns within a niche, identified as two Baphomets.

The northern side is similar to the southern one; however, the first bay features a decentralized blind bifora, and the second shows traces of a small door. The third bay has a decentralized lateral entrance (no explanation for this anomaly has been found); the subsequent section is obscured by the New Sacristy and the Episcopal Palace.

The eaves of the naves and buttresses feature intertwined terracotta arches.

=== Bell tower ===
The cathedral’s bells

The cathedral’s bell ensemble is particularly significant. The bronze bells, cast in 1753 by the Domenico Crespi foundry, survived the requisitions of World War II, which spared cathedral bells. The set consists of six bells in the tones Re♭3, F3, A♭3, Re♭4, Mi♭4, F4, plus a seventh smaller bell in Mi4, cast in 1828 by Andrea Crespi, used to summon the Chapter and rung daily at 8 a.m. The bells are perfectly tuned, with a uniform and soft timbre. However, all six bells are used in full peal, known as the scampanàda dal Dòm, only during major solemnities.

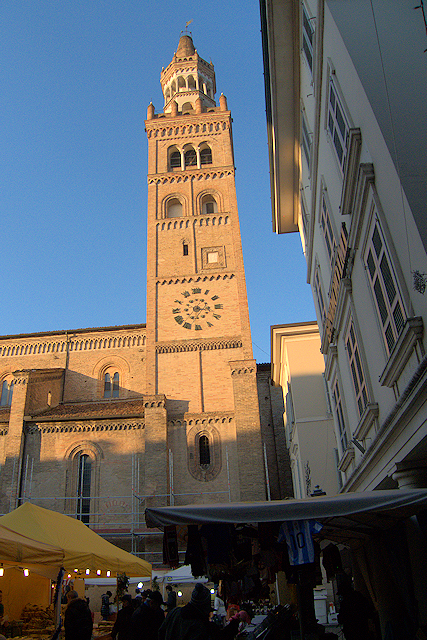
The bell tower

The bell tower, built between the 13th and 14th century, is integrated into the church, adjoining the San Pantaleone chapel, yet appears almost as a standalone architectural element.

If extended to the ground, it would have a square base of approximately 6.5 meters per side, divided into six levels with belt courses and pilasters at the corners. At the base, two pillars differ in size and height from the side buttresses.

The first level reaches the height of the side nave's roof, featuring a splayed window with elaborate, possibly Eastern-influenced decoration on the southern side. A series of arches separates it from the upper level. On the eastern side, another window and a small door at mid-height are present, once used to access a makeshift bell-ringer's dwelling, removed during 20th-century restorations.

The second level is blind, with paneling divided by a vertical rib.

The third level's southern wall features an electrically operated clock, and the western wall has two small slits. Inside the tower, the original mechanism, built by Domenico Crespi in 1751 and later expanded by Giuseppe Kohlschitter in the 19th century, is preserved.

The fourth level is blind on three sides (with a central rib) but differs on the southern side, with a small monofora on the left and a terracotta-framed plaque on the right, depicting a rampant unicorn, symbolizing happiness and fortune in the ancient Near East.

The fifth level has two round-arched windows on each side, with the arches extending over the pilasters.

The top level, the bell chamber, features a trifora on each side with paired columns, preceded by a frieze of intertwined arches and a cornice supporting a balustrade with twelve pinnacles.

The crowning lantern is an octagon divided into three parts: the lower section has blind arches; the central section is a walkable gallery with two arches on each side, supporting a frieze of intertwined arches and an upper cornice topped by a balustrade with eight turrets; the tower concludes with a conical roof and a railing.

The bell tower stands 58 meters tall.

== Interior ==
=== Architectural layout ===
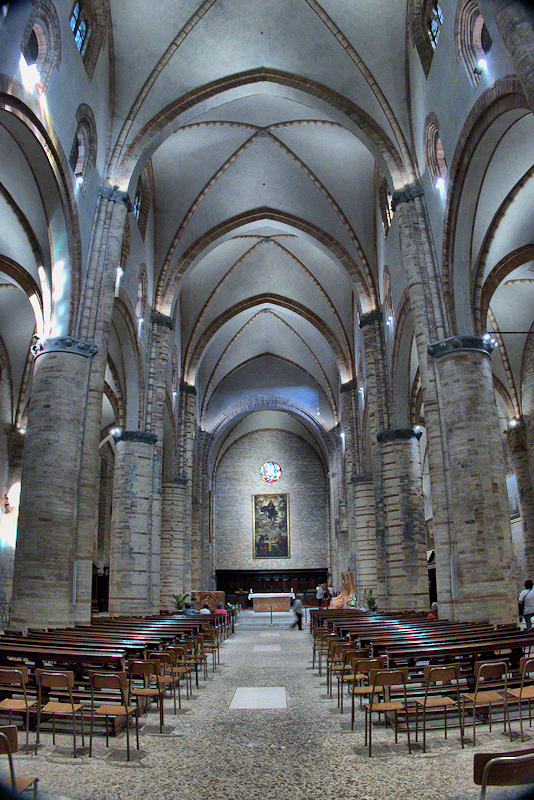
The central nave

The Crema Cathedral has a three-nave layout: the central nave ends in a flat apse in the Cistercian style, while the side naves conclude with chapels. From the square, one steps down to the ancient opus signinum floor.

Massive columns separating the naves support cylindrical semi-columns toward the central nave, continuing into pointed transverse arches. The vaults of each bay in the central nave are groin vaults.

The columns supporting the round-arched triumphal arch have different capitals. The right column's arch attachment is lower, suggesting that the post-Barbarossa siege reconstruction initially planned a lower nave.

The central nave's windows include, on each bay, two lower monoforas (false matronea opening onto the side naves’ attic) and an upper bifora providing light.

=== Artworks ===
Despite the Baroque renovation's substantial destruction of the 14th-15th-century decorative scheme, traces of the original design remain, and the cathedral continues to house numerous significant artworks.

==== Left side ====
The first bay of the left nave houses the altar of the Madonna della Misericordia, with a longstanding devotion. It retains its Baroque form, featuring polychrome marbles and statues in the Fantoni style representing David and Solomon. At the center is a fresco of the Madonna with Child, commissioned by Crema's lord Giorgio Benzoni in the early 1400s and painted by Rinaldo da Spino. Later, Vincenzo Civerchio added Saint Joseph and Saint John the Baptist and an architectural setting. Mauro Picenardi further added cherubs among clouds.

In the second left bay, a panel by Vincenzo Civerchio, depicting Saint Sebastian between Saints Christopher and Roch, was commissioned in 1518 by the Consuls of the Merchants at the end of a pestilence. The painting contrasts the nude, ecstatic Saint Sebastian with the darkly clad, intricately draped saints beside him. Saint Christopher is depicted in a realistic movement, carrying a child on his shoulders, while Saint Roch appears pensive. A stone bears the signature V.C. I.D.XVIII, dating it to 1518. The wall also preserves a fragment of an ancient fresco, the face of a Madonna Enthroned.

The third left bay contains the lateral entrance and the door to the New Sacristy. Before the 2010–2014 restorations, it housed Civerchio's Assumption, now moved to the altar. A large canvas by Guido Reni, previously in the fourth right bay, Christ Appearing to Saint Mark, was relocated there. This 17th-century work, commissioned by the Mount of Piety for the Saint Mark altar, depicts Jesus among angels in bright light, Saint Mark praying in prison, and stunned guards below, one shielding his face in despair, another turning to observe the scene.

The fourth bay features the most significant frescoes from the original decorative scheme: Saint Pantaleon between two seated figures, one clearly a Madonna with fragments of the Child. In February 2024, Francesco Bissolo’s Holy Family or Holy Conversation, previously in the second right bay, was moved there. It depicts the Madonna with Child, Saint Joseph, the young John the Baptist, and two unidentified monastic saints in a classical frame.

The fifth left bay's lower area houses confessionals.

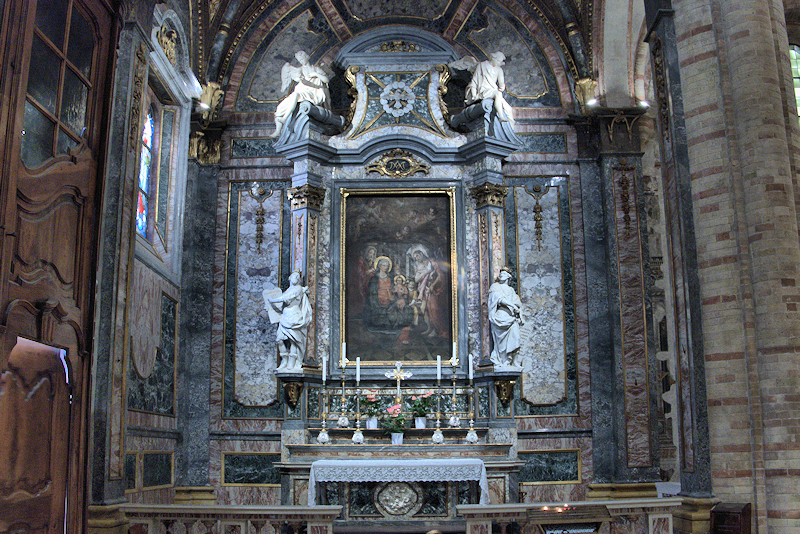
The altar of the Madonna della Misericordia

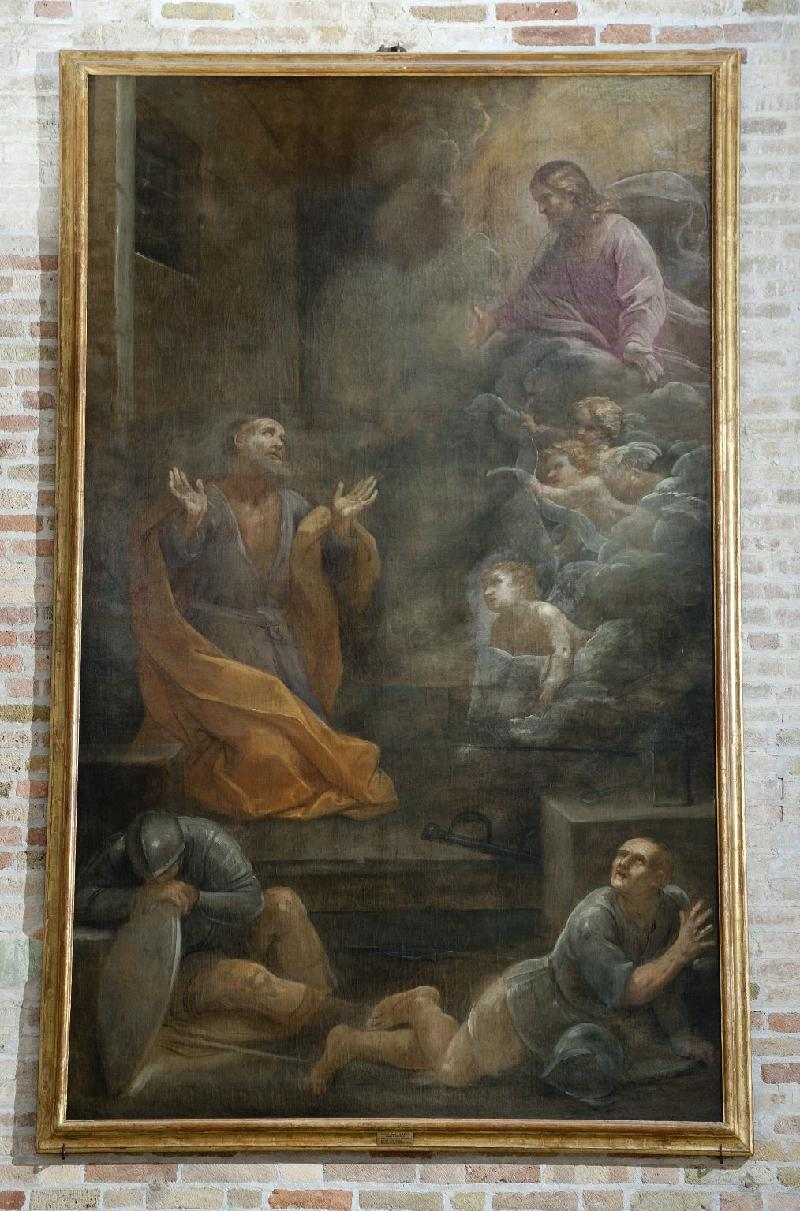
Guido Reni, Jesus Christ Appearing to Saint Mark in Prison, oil on canvas, ca. 1625–1642

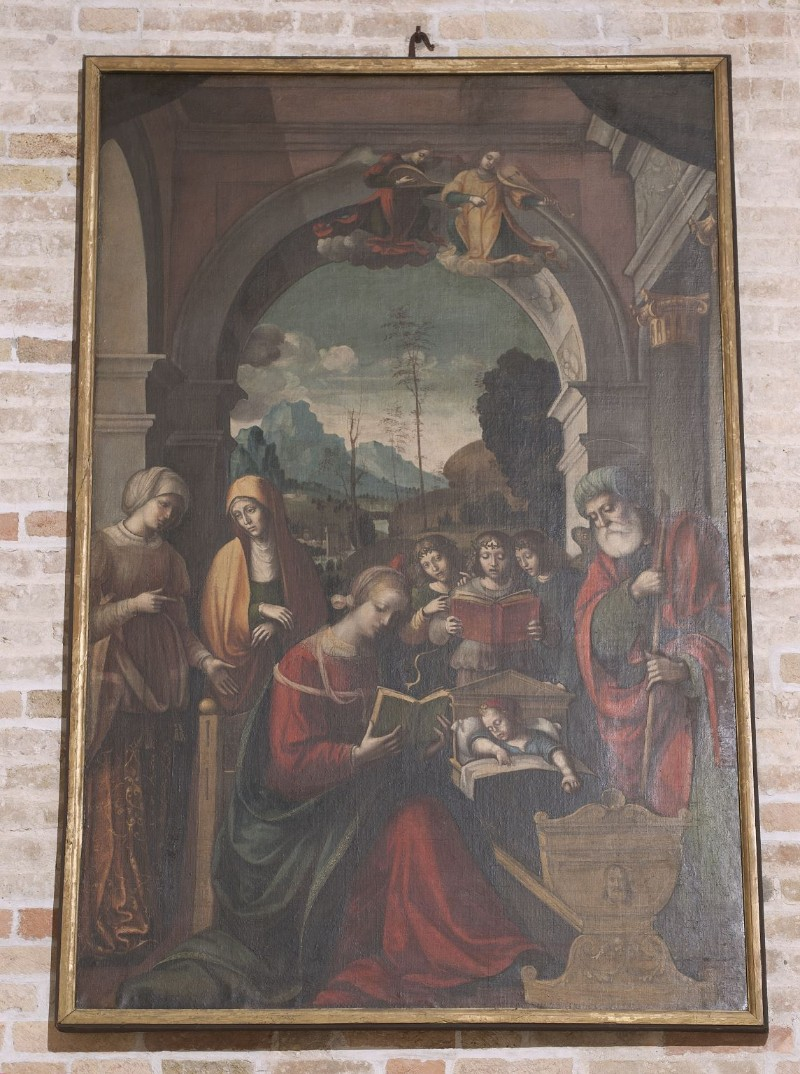
Workshop of Vincenzo Civerchio, The Holy Family, oil on canvas, ca. 1525–1549

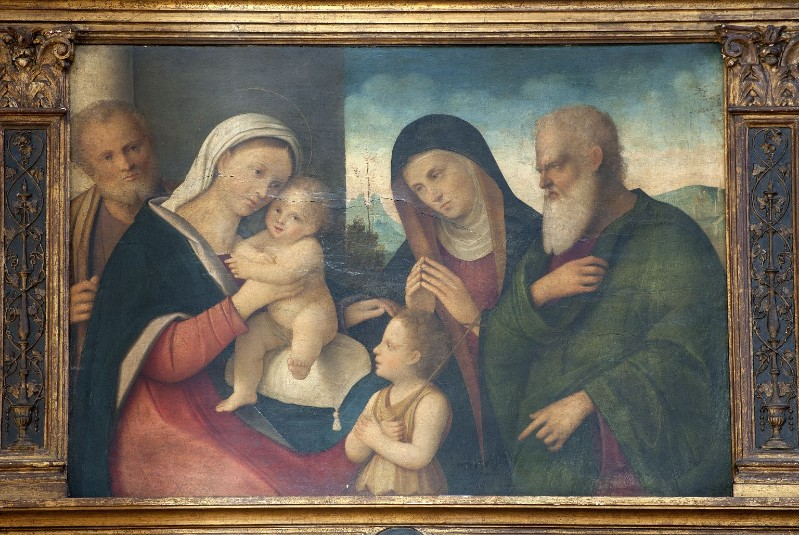
Francesco Bissolo, Holy Conversation, oil on canvas, ca. 1500–1524

==== Presbytery, crypt, and rear chapels ====
The Miraculous Crucifix

Devotion to this crucifix dates back to 1448, when the Guelphs and Ghibellines were in dispute. The Ghibellines had driven the Guelphs out of the city. Giovanni Alchini, a man from Bergamo who had taken refuge in the cathedral with some soldiers, believed the crucifix was Guelph because its head was tilted to the right. He threw it into the fire. Those present reacted immediately, pulling the crucifix out of the flames and noticing that it portrayed the Lord with his legs exposed. The sacrilegious act certainly has roots in truth; during restoration work in 1999, signs of the ancient burns were discovered. Since then, the people of Crema have been given the nickname brusacristi (Christ burners), though the act was committed by a "foreigner".

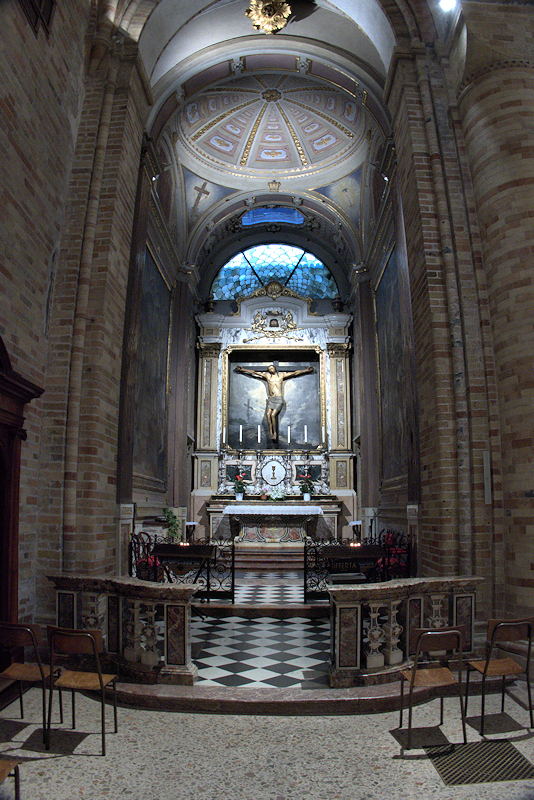
The Crucifix chapel

The Crucifix Chapel, located to the left of the main altar, features an 18th-century decorative scheme. Two 19th-century paintings by Sante Legnani depict The Crucifix Thrown into the Flames and Supplication to the Crucifix. The focal point is the large, venerated wooden Crucifix, carved between 1250 and 1275, likely in France. It displays an intense, painful expression, contrasting with the more primitive body. A 1999 restoration removed dirt and overpainting, revealing the 1448 burn marks. Uniquely, the statue's condition was assessed using CT scans at the Ospedale Maggiore, confirming it was carved from a single trunk with attached arms.

The presbytery was lowered during the 20th-century restorations to restore spatial proportions. The 18th-century Baroque main altar was moved during the 1952–1959 restorations to the Sacro Cuore di Gesù parish church, inaugurated in 1956 in the Crema Nuova neighborhood. It was replaced with a new altar without a reredos or tabernacle, featuring a table decorated with foliage motifs from fragments of the Milan Cathedral’s ancient pavement, made of Candoglia marble and placed on a three-step white marble predella, matching the presbytery's pavement. In January 1966, liturgical reforms prompted its replacement with a simple table with two Candoglia marble supports. This altar was moved in 1980 to the Madonna delle Fontane Sanctuary in Casaletto Ceredano. The current table, crafted by Mario Toffetti in 1979 based on Beppe Ermentini's design, depicts biblical scenes. The suspended gilded silver cross is by sculptor Nicola Sebastio, a gift from Bishop Carlo Manziana.

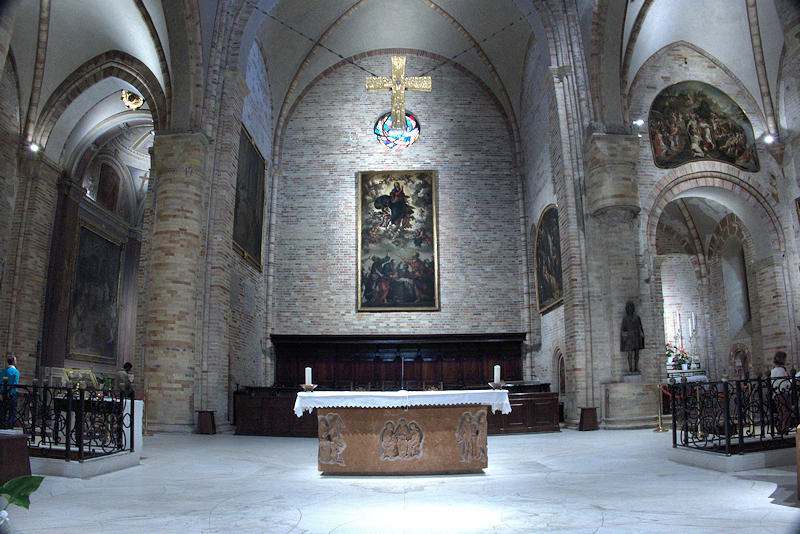
The main altar. The Assumption canvas is visible on the apse wall, with the cross above

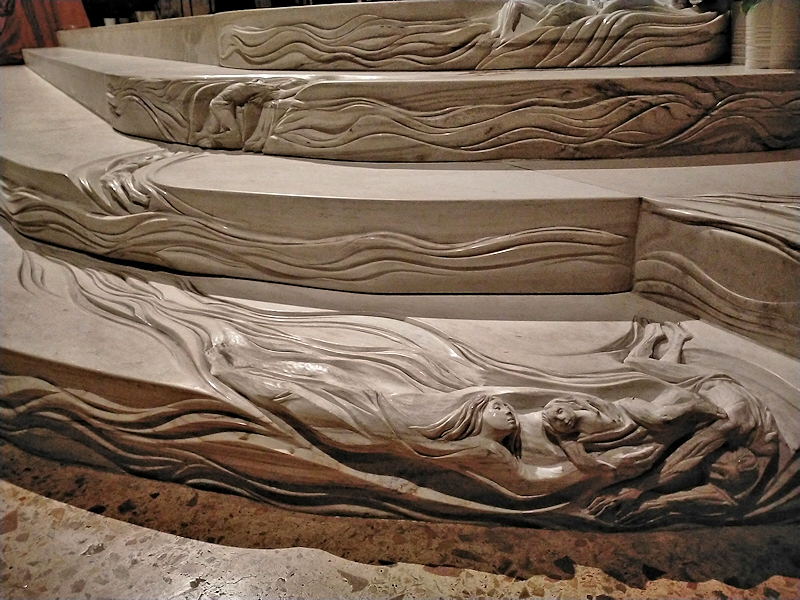
Detail of the steps, by Mario Toffetti

The presbyteral area underwent significant reorganization after the 2010–2014 restorations. The new episcopal cathedra, placed on the right, is carved from a single block of Asiago red marble by Mario Toffetti, featuring the Good Shepherd on the backrest and Popes Paul VI and John Paul II, the only popes to visit Crema, on the sides (though Montini visited as a cardinal in 1959).

Toffetti also designed the grey-white rosewood marble floor with quartz inlays, depicting biblical scenes on curved steps, and the new ambon, rich in symbolic imagery, including family faces, his final sculpture before his death.

With the organ dismantled, the apse wall canvases were rearranged. The 5-meter-high Assumption canvas is now on the front. Previously attributed to multiple artists (apostles by Vincenzo Civerchio, Mary Assumed among angels by Carlo Urbino), recent studies suggest that Civerchio was the sole author, and that Mauro Picenardi's 1790 restoration was due to deterioration. The Annunciation canvas, which was previously located opposite the organ, is now on the left wall, a masterpiece by Vincenzo Civerchio. Painted in tempera on two sliding organ-shutter panels, it depicts the Virgin on the right with a book on a lectern and an angel in motion on the left, in a scene with a strong perspective. A Holy Family, by Civerchio or his school, is also on the left wall.

In 2024, a wooden statue of the Madonna, previously in the fourth left bay, was moved beside the presbytery, replacing a Saint Nazarius statue, of unknown authorship (though Lidia Ceserani attributes it to Vincenzo Civerchio), carved from an elm trunk and painted with egg tempera.

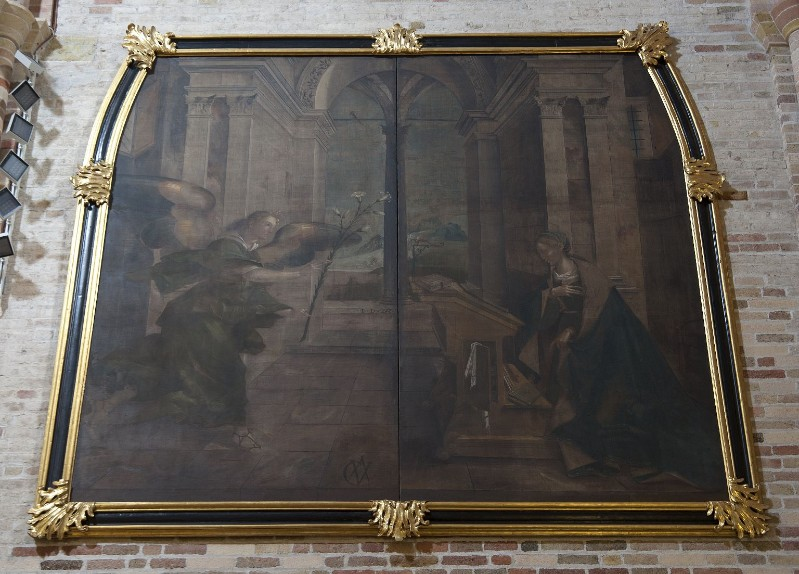
Vincenzo Civerchio, Annunciation, tempera on canvas, 1523

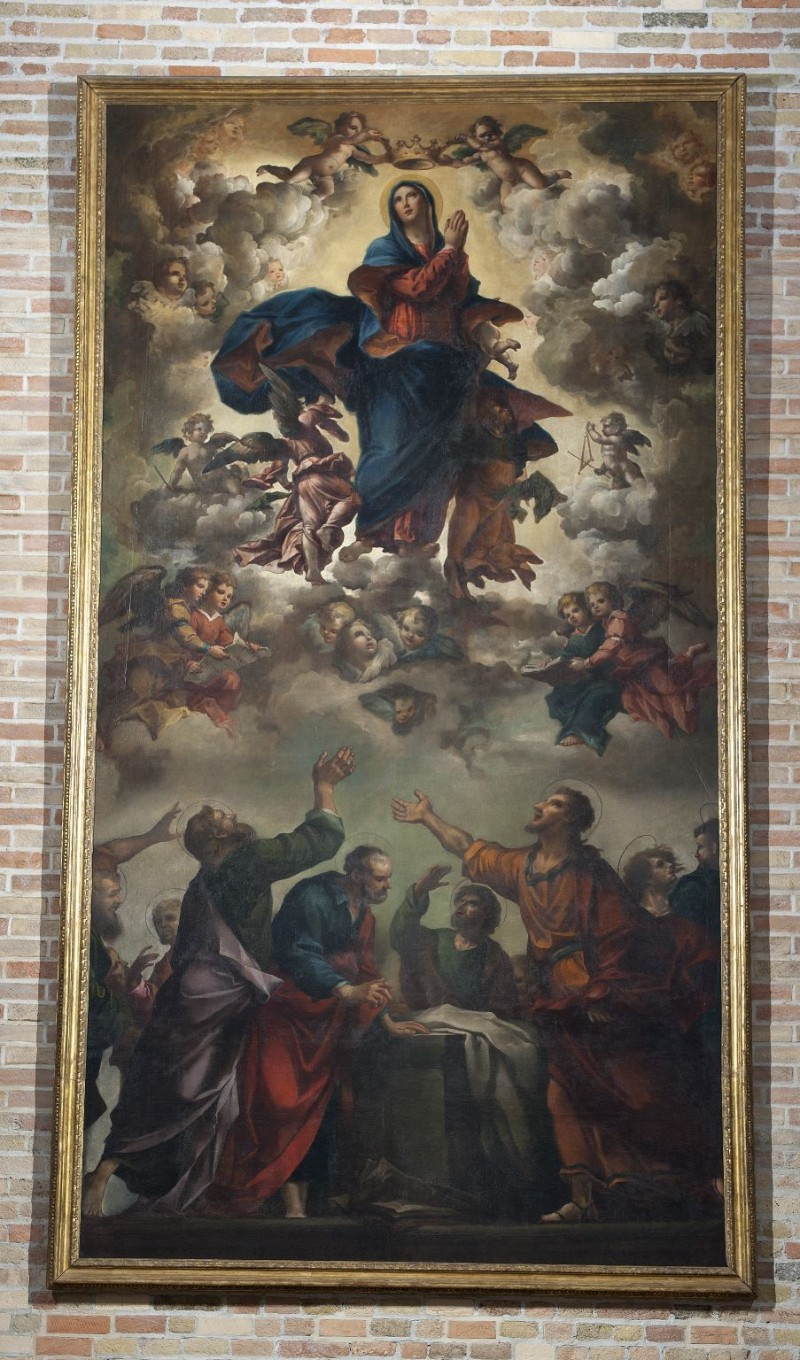
Vincenzo Civerchio (1525) with retouching by Mauro Picenardi (ca. 1776–1780), Madonna Assunta, oil on canvas

The south choir wall contains a niche with a late 14th-century fresco of the Seven Sleepers.

The crypt is accessed via two marble staircases flanking the main altar. The columns are original, but the reinforced concrete ceiling was added during mid-20th-century restorations to restore the 14th-century altar level. The back wall features an ancient polychrome marble altar with the Madonna del Popolo statue by Mauro Picenardi.

Since 2016, the crypt houses the wooden Lamentation group, previously at the Sanctuary of the Beata Vergine del Marzale until 1991. Comprising eight statues from the fifth decade (Raffaele Casciaro) or the second half of the 15th century (Cesare Alpini), it depicts three male figures—Saint John, Joseph of Arimathea, and Nicodemus—and four female figures—the Madonna, Mary Magdalene, Mary of Clopas, and Mary Salome—surrounding the martyred Christ. Flanking the Lamentation are two paintings by Ugo Bacchetta, donated by the family via Emilio Canidio in 2020, depicting the Crucifixion and Deposition.

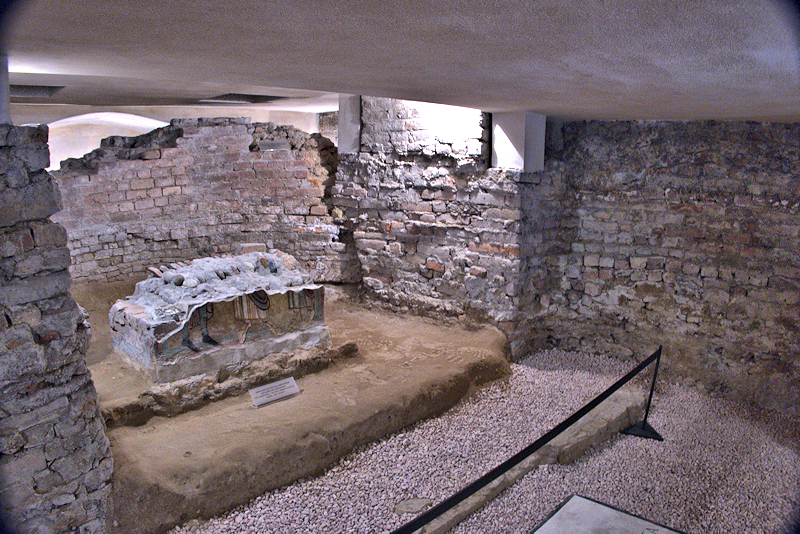
Remains of the ancient cathedral

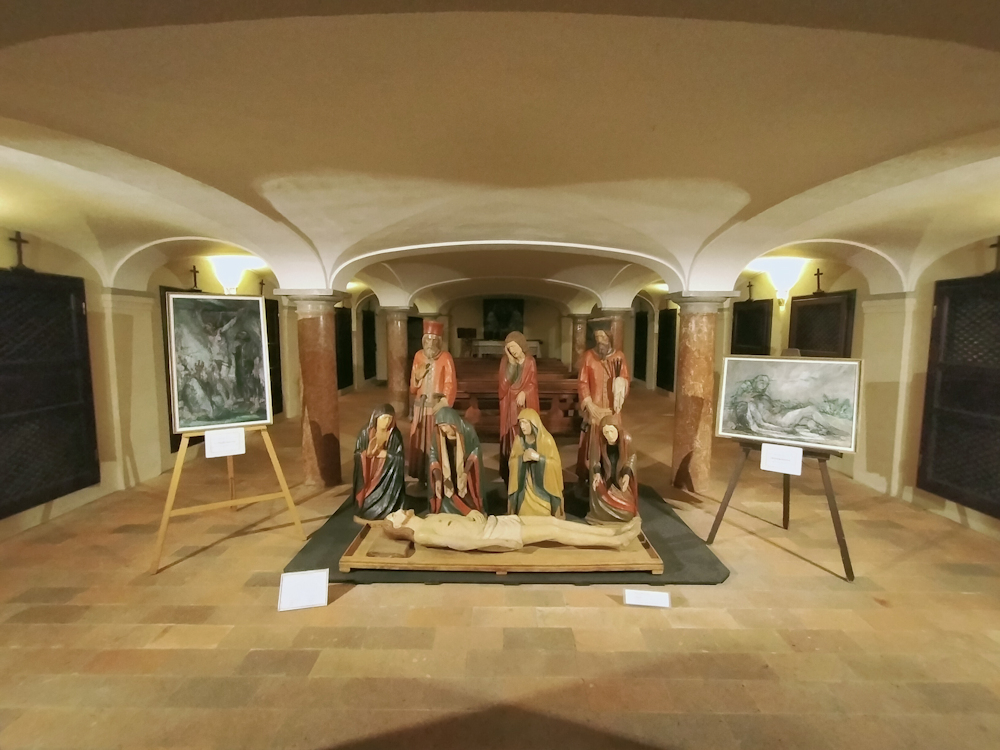
The 15th century wooden Lamentation group, flanked by two paintings by Ugo Bacchetta

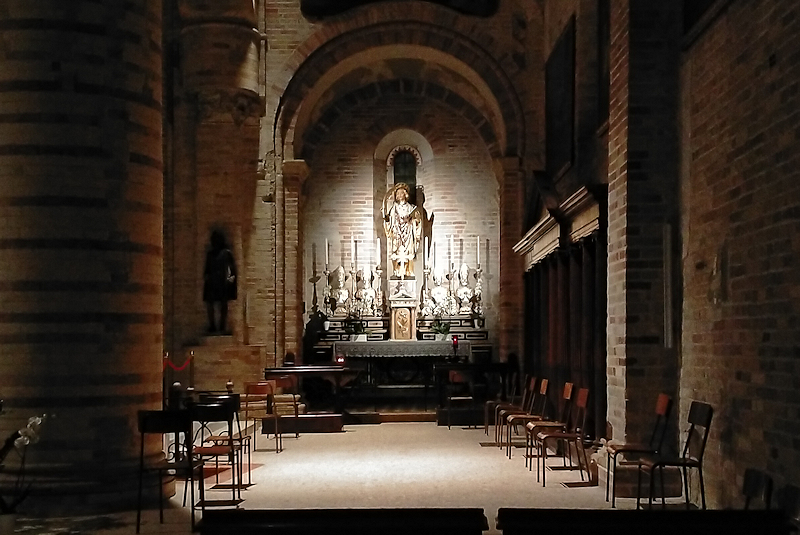
The San Pantaleone chapel, patron saint of the city

To the right of the main altar is the San Pantaleone chapel, where a niche under the monofora houses a fresco of the Madonna with Jesus in Her Arms and a Kneeling Praying Friar. The altar holds a life-sized wooden statue of Saint Pantaleon by Vincenzo Civerchio (ca. 1528–1530), depicted in a brocade cloak and ermine mantle, holding Galen's book in his left hand and the martyr's palm in his right. This statue is carried in procession on June 10, the patron saint's day.

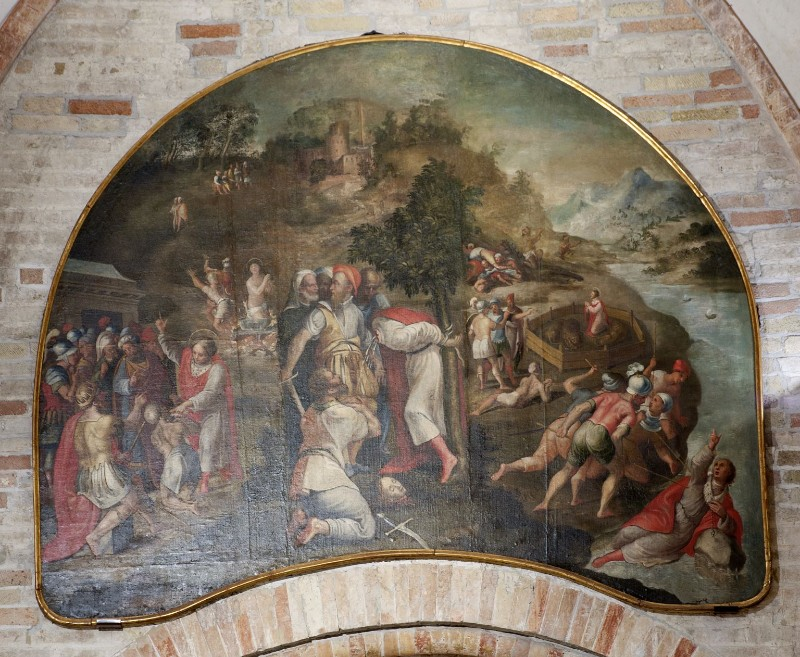
Carlo Urbino (ca. 1550–1574) with retouching by Mauro Picenardi (ca. 1776–1780), The Martyrdom of Saint Pantaleon, oil on canvas

On the left wall hangs Saint Pantaleon with Saints Victorian and Bellinus by Mauro Picenardi. In a brightly lit scene, Saint Pantaleon and Saint Bellinus look upward, while Saint Victorian appears pensive; an angel at the bottom, forming a diamond shape, gazes at the viewer.

On the entrance arch is The Passion of Saint Pantaleon by Carlo Urbino from the 16th century, a composition of three canvases retouched by Mauro Picenardi, depicting five of the saint's seven torments in a crowded, fantastical landscape.

==== Pipe organ ====
Before the 2010–2014 restorations, a pipe organ, built in 1963 by the Tamburini firm and expanded in 1966 with additional stops, was located behind the main altar on the apse wall. It reused sound material and parts of the wind chests from the previous 1908 Inzoli organ, adapted for fully electric transmission, with a mobile independent console featuring three 61-note keyboards and a 32-note concave-radial pedalboard.

The organ was dismantled during the cathedral's 2011 restoration. Needing repairs after less successful 1980s interventions, but lacking funds, the diocese acquired a 1984 organ by the Dutch firm Fama & Raadgever through a donation, later transferred to the Capergnanica parish. The original organ underwent extensive restoration and maintenance, with considerations to convert it to mechanical transmission. Some, including Crema organist Alessandro Lupo Pasini, questioned the costly conversion, noting the Tamburini organ could function with routine maintenance. Associations such as Italia Nostra supported restoring the historic organ to preserve Crema's significant organ-building heritage. Since its reopening, the cathedral has used a temporary positive organ provided on loan by its organist, Alberto Dossena.

==== Right side ====
At the fifth right bay, above the confessionals, are two Eucharistic-themed paintings by Giovanni Battista Lucini. In The Miracle of Offida, two women—one young, the other elderly—watch in amazement as the host glows as they try to burn it; a child at the center is unaware of the event. The Communion of Blessed Cadamosto is set in a church, where a priest is depicted observing in a state of awe as the host ascends toward the mouth of the kneeling blessed, accompanied by the probable presence of an altar boy seen from behind.

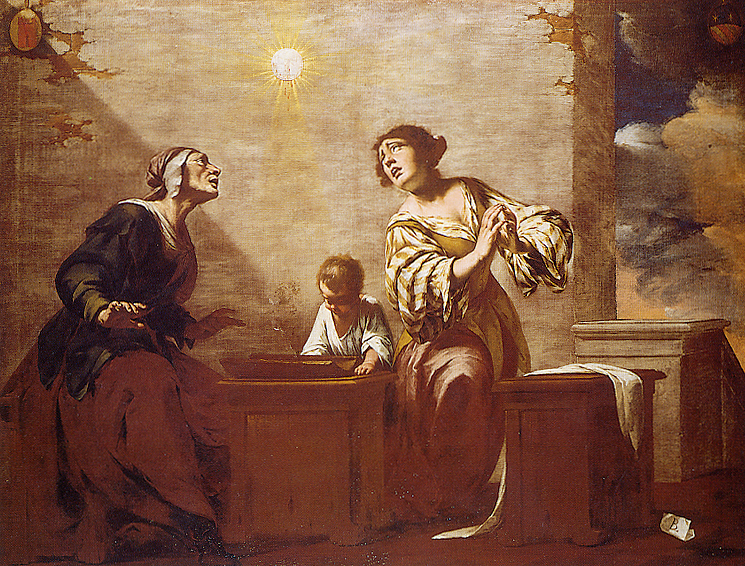
Giovanni Battista Lucini, The Miracle of the Stolen Host, oil on canvas, 1685

Two more Lucini canvases, previously in the fifth left bay, were moved to the fourth right bay in 2024. Continuing the Eucharistic theme, The Miracle of Pozen depicts an episode that took place in Poland. After being subjected to violence, the host began to ooze blood and glow brightly. Against the backdrop of an illuminated stage, popular characters dressed in 17th-century clothing stand out as they surround the host at its center. The Miracle of Bolsena depicts a skeptical priest observing the host bleeding on the ground in front of an altar. Figures in the painting express disbelief and shock in a perspective setting.

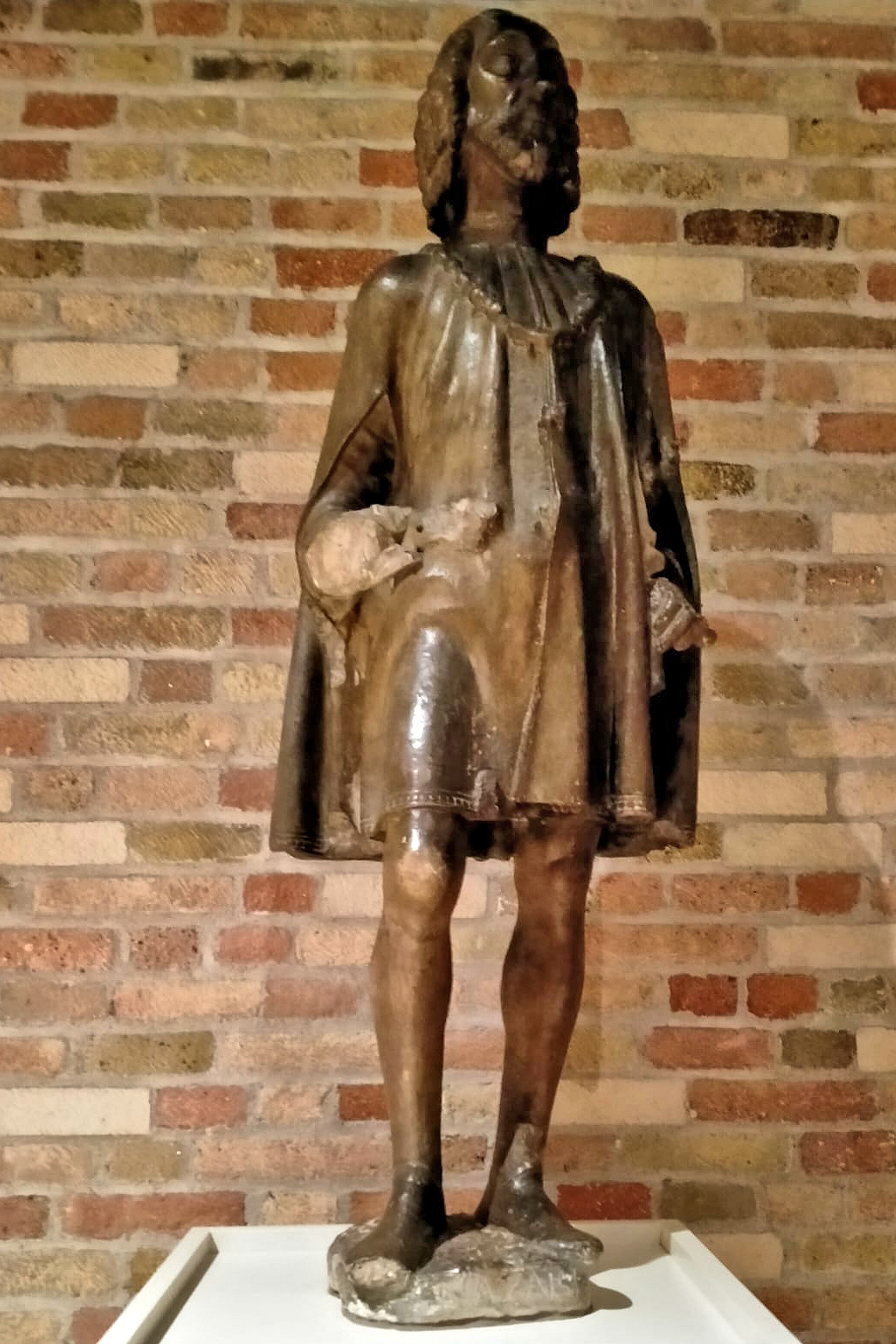
Pietro Antonio Scolari, Saint Nazarius, ca. 1480

In 2024, a statue of Saint Nazarius, previously in the presbytery, was relocated there. Cardinal Montini donated it during the inauguration of the 1952 restoration. It is attributed to Pietro Antonio Scolari and dated around 1480.

The third bay leads to a side entrance.

The second bay's wall holds a canvas of Saint Lucy, highly venerated in Crema, by Mauro Picenardi. During her martyrdom, she is depicted gazing ecstatically skyward. Angels appear among lit clouds, and a soldier attempts to drag her while she is bound by a rope. Below, a peasant's face and two ox heads appear.

Also on the wall is a 19th-century sculptural monument to Pope Pius IX by Quintiliano Corbellini, with a Latin inscription noting the pope's Cremasque origins.

A Baroque marble altar in the first bay, surrounded by a balustrade, houses the sarcophagus of Saint Hyacinth, donated by Cardinal Pietro Ottoboni and his nephew Antonio to the podestà. The wall is adorned with a late 14th-century shrine depicting the Madonna and Child.

The baptismal font, which is now located toward the counter-façade, is an octagonal structure made of Carrara marble. It is covered by a 16th-century walnut cabinet with a pagoda-style roof and geometric motifs.

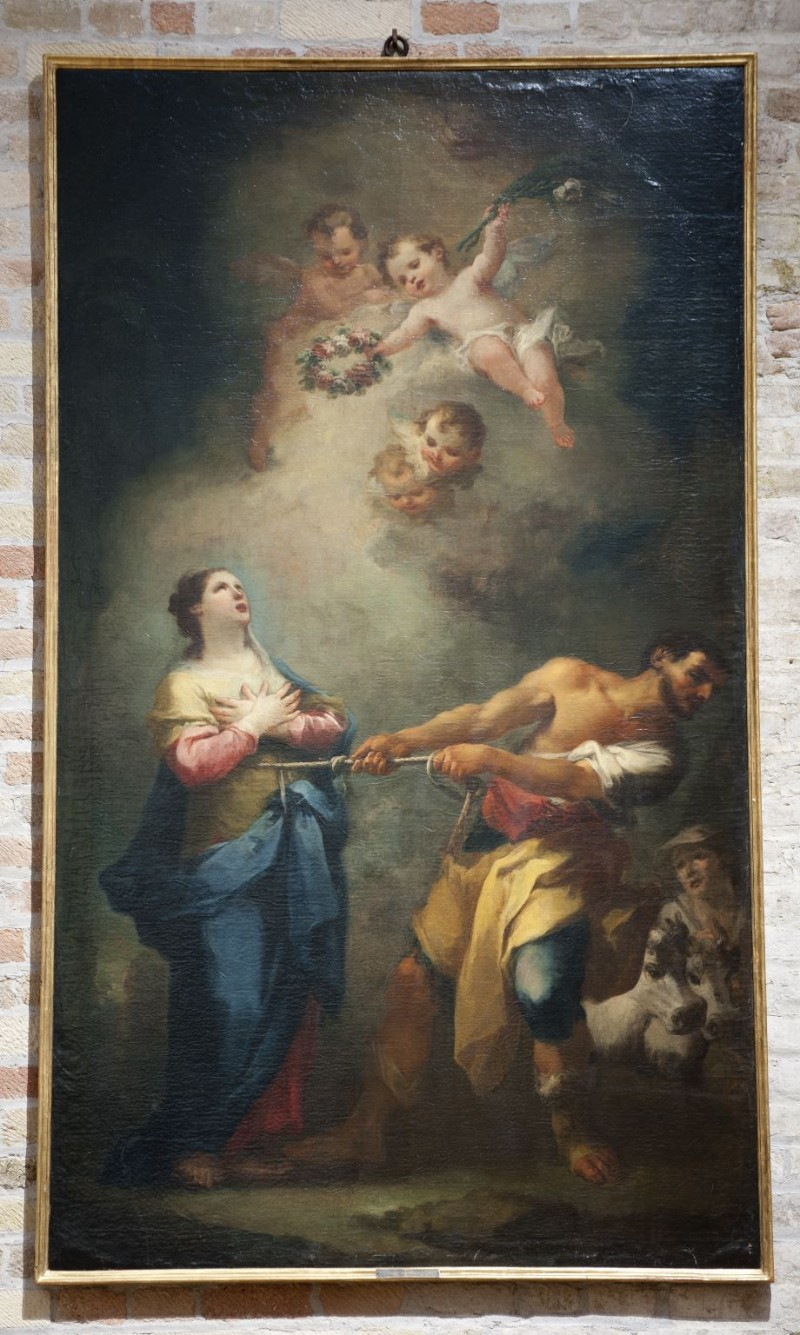
Mauro Picenardi, Martyrdom of Saint Lucy, oil on canvas, ca. 1750–1799

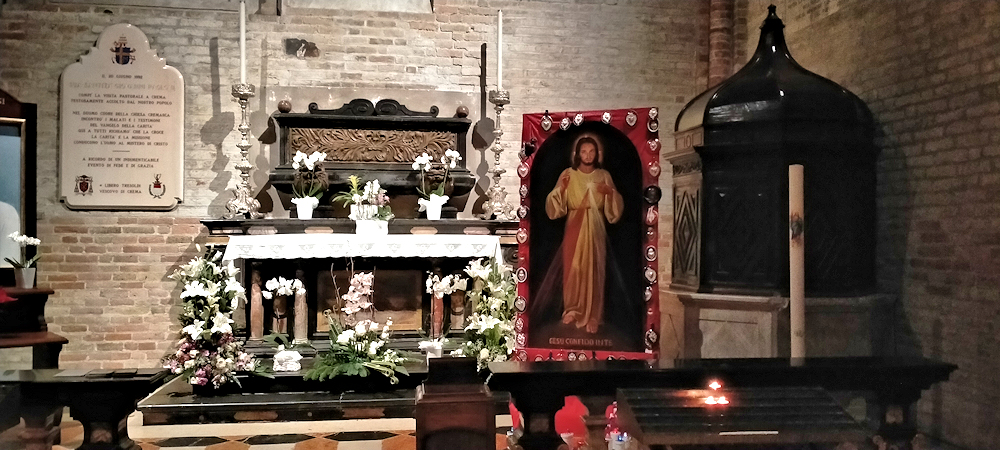
The first right altar with Saint Hyacinth's sarcophagus and the baptismal font

==== Counterfacade ====
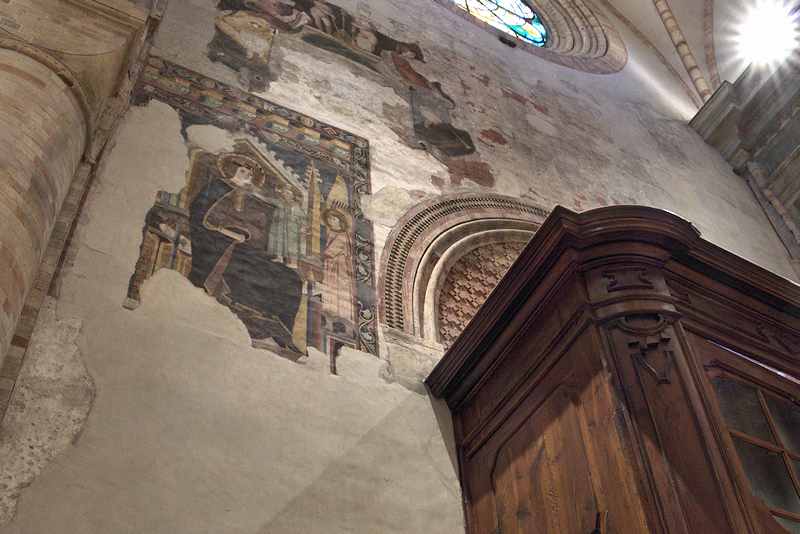
Remains of 14th-century frescoes on the counterfacade

Traces of ancient frescoes on the counterfacade include a Majesty, a saint holding a book, a Madonna with Child, and angelic figures. The lateral biforas have fine 19th-century German stained-glass windows depicting Saint Sebastian and Saint Victor. The rose window’s stained glass, from 1980, was designed by Beppe and Marco Ermentini.

==== Sacristies and penitentiary ====
From the Crucifix chapel, one accesses the old sacristy, a square room with groin vaults with ribs and a central stone column with a capital carved with flowers, leaves, and zoomorphic elements, dating to the second reconstruction phase and adorned with period frescoes.

The old sacristy leads to the canons’ sacristy, housing 17th-century furniture and various paintings: The Adoration of the Magi by Bergamasque painter Paolo Cavagna; two Madonnas with Child, attributed to Carlo Urbino according to the chapter archive inventory; The Confession of Saint Paul and The Departure of Tobias, likely by Mauro Picenardi according to the same inventory; an anonymous Crucified Christ; four semicircular paintings of uncertain attribution on The Education of Mary, possibly by Vincenzo Civerchio's school, Giovanni Battista Castello, or Francesco Catena; and three anonymous, likely Cremasque, paintings: The Death, The Assumption, and The Coronation of Mary.

The room also holds a 1747 ex-voto, the Quintano Miracle, commissioned by Quintano residents in gratitude for protection from a cattle plague. The painting, which depicts a supplicating priest, cherubs, the praying population, and the church of the time, features an embossed silver crucifix.

The penitentiary's decoration, a 1962 tempera work by Rosario Folcini, features themes of the Paschal mystery.

== See also ==
- Diocese of Crema

== Bibliography ==
- Cambié, Augusto (1913). Il Duomo di Crema. Crema: Basso.
- Verga, Guido (1931). Studio sul Duomo di Crema. Cremona: Cremona Nuova.
- Edallo, Amos (1955). Il Duomo di Crema alla luce dei nuovi restauri. Crema: Banca Popolare Agricola.
- Bombelli, Andrea (1959). Crema Bella. Guida artistica di Crema e dintorni (2 ed.). Cremona: Cremona Nuova. pp. 19–25.
- Ceserani Ermentini, Lidia (1989). Il Duomo di Crema. Cremona: Camera di commercio, industria, artigianato e agricoltura.
- Ceserani Ermentini, Lidia (1988). Il campanile del Duomo di Crema. Documenti e storia in Insula Fulcheria. Crema.
- Ceserani Ermentini, Lidia (1990). Il volto della città. Crema nella storia e nell'arte. Crema: Leva Artigrafiche.
- Piastrella, Carlo (1992). Una storia della città, in «Crema». Cremona: Cartesio Editrice.
- Edallo, Dado (1995). Crema, la formazione del tessuto urbano in L'immagine di Crema a cura del Gruppo Antropologico Cremasco. Crema: Leva Artigrafiche.
- Miscioscia, Annunziata (2003). Crema. Crema: Comune di Crema.
- Zucchelli, Giorgio (2003). La Cattedrale di Crema. Cremona: edizioni Il Nuovo Torrazzo.
- Gruppo Antropologico Cremasco (2007). Campane è campanér. Crema: Buona Stampa.
- Autori vari (2009). I campanili della Diocesi di Crema. Crema: Leva Artigrafiche.
- "Campane e campanili cremaschi". Archived from the original on May 18, 2014.
- Carniti, Don Giacomo (2001). "Storia degli organi della Cattedrale di Crema" (PDF). Insula Fulcheria. XLI. Castelleone: Grafiche Rossi: 81–123.
- "Archivio del quotidiano La Provincia". Archived from the original on May 21, 2014.
- Various authors (2019). Diocesi di Crema. Crema: Cancelleria Vescovile.
- Venchiarutti, Walter (2024). I simboli della Cattedrale di Crema. Cremona: Fantigrafica.
- Rossi, Armando (2024). I rosoni medievali. Significato, simboli, esoterismo e numerologia. Fontana editore.
