= Diocese of Crema =

Roman Catholic diocese in Italy

Coordinates: 45.3667°N 9.6833°E

Diocese of Crema Dioecesis Cremensis

Catholic
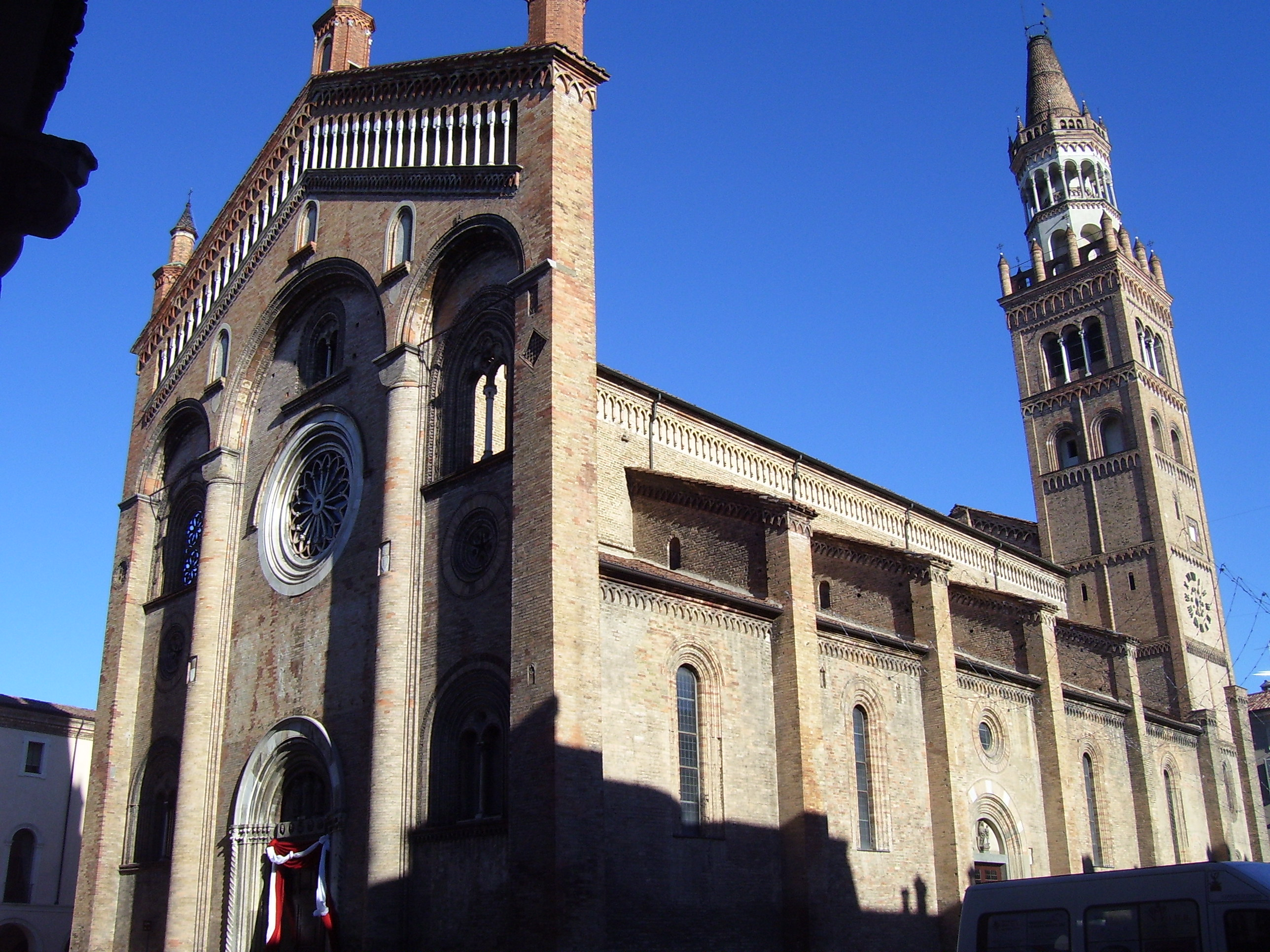
- Crema Cathedral

Location
- Country: Italy
- Ecclesiastical province: Milan

Statistics
- Area: 276 km^{2} (107 sq mi)
- Population: Total; Catholics: (as of 2023); 99,500 (est.) ▼; 98,500 (guess)
- Parishes: 63

Information
- Denomination: Catholic Church
- Rite: Roman Rite
- Established: 11 April 1579 (447 years ago)
- Cathedral: Cattedrale di S. Maria Assunta
- Secular priests: 66 (diocesan) ▼6 (Religious Orders) ▼3 Permanent Deacons ▲

Current leadership
- Pope: Leo XIV
- Bishop: Daniele Gianotti

Map

Website
- www.diocesidicrema.it

The Diocese of Crema (Latin: Dioecesis Cremensis) is a Latin diocese of the Catholic Church in Lombardy in northern Italy. It has existed since 1579. It is suffragan to the Archdiocese of Milan. The seat of the bishop is the cathedral of Santa Maria Assunta.

== History ==
Founded in the sixth century, the town of Crema endured a particularly hazardous geographical position in terms of its civic independence. It is only 29.7 km east of Milan, and its neighbor to the east, the Serene Republic of Venice, was always pressing to expand its holdings on the mainland. In addition the German emperors held the overlordship of the Po Valley, and from time to time dominated the political situation. Otto of Freising (died 1158), for instance, draws attention to Crema's situation in the perpetual struggle between Cremona and Milan, situated as Crema was, just halfway between Cremona and Milan. It bore a good deal of the military action, and, as Cremona regularly rejected its demands in litigation for redress and reparations, Crema developed a grudge. This was particularly wrenching since Crema was politically subject to Cremona and spiritually subject to its bishop. To gain an advantage, the leaders of Cremona urged the Emperor Frederic Barbarossa to destroy Crema in exchange for a considerable sum of money, which would allow him to pursue his ventures in the Po Valley. The citizens of Crema therefore threw in their lot with Milan.

Crema became subject to the Republic of Venice in September 1449, and the possession was ratified by the Treaty of Blois, between Louis XII of France and the Republic of Venice, on 23 March 1513.

=== Creation of diocese, matropolitan ===
The diocese of Crema was created by Pope Gregory XIII on 11 April 1579, by splitting off territory that had been part of the Diocese of Lodi, the diocese of Cremona, and the diocese of Piacenza.

On 10 December 1582, with the bull "Universi orbis", Gregory XIII raised the diocese of Bologna, his birthplace, to the status of a metropolitan archbishopric, annexing the diocese of Crema and six others as its suffragans.

=== Synods ===
A diocesan synod was held in Crema on 3–5 January 1650 by Bishop Alberto Badoer (1633–1677). On 9–11 September 1688, Bishop Marcantonio Zollio (1678–1702) held a diocesan synod in the cathedral of Crema. Bishop Faustino Giuseppe Griffoni Sant’Angelo (1702–1730) presided over a diocesan synod on 4–6 November 1727. A diocesan synod was held by Bishop Ludovico Calini (1730–1751) in 1737 on 29 April and the two following days.

=== French occupation ===
In 1801, following the principles established in law by the French National Assembly in 1791, the number of dioceses in French territory in Savoy, Piedmont, and Lombardy was to be reduced. Crema was one of the dioceses which was suppressed. The cathedral Chapter, the seminary, and the mendicant religious orders were also suppressed. It was the Emperor Napoleon, King of Italy, who, on 19 July 1806, brought the diocese back to life with his nomination of Tommaso Ronna of Milan to be the new bishop; Pius VII approved the candidate on 19 March 1807.

On 5 February 1835, with the bull "Romani Pontifices", Pope Gregory XVI assigned the diocese of Crema as suffragan of the archdiocese of Milan. The change was made at the insistence of Count Richard von Lutzow, the ambassador in Rome of Ferdinand I, King of Lombardy-Venetia.

== Bishops of Crema ==
=== 1580 to 1800 ===
- (1580–1584) : Girolamo Diedo
- (1584–1616) : Gian Giacomo Diedo
- (1616–1629) : Pietro Emo, C.R.
- (1629–1633) : Marcantonio Bragadin
- (1633–1677) : Alberto Badoer
- (1678–1702) : Marcantonio Zollio
- (1702–1730) : Faustino Giuseppe Griffoni Sant’Angelo
- (1730–1751) : Ludovico Calini
- (1751–1781) : Marco Antonio Lombardi
- (1782–1800) : Antonio Maria Gardini, O.S.B.

=== since 1800 ===
- (1807–1828) : Tommaso Ronna
- (1835–1854) : Carlo Giuseppe Sanguettola
- (1857–1859) : Pietro Maria Ferré
- (1859–1867) : Carlo Macchi
- (1871–1893) : Francesco Sabbia
- (1894–1910) : Ernesto Fontana
- (1911–1915) : Bernardo Pizzorno
- (1915–1925) : Carlo Dalmazio Minoretti
- (1925–1928) : Giacomo Montanelli
- (1930–1933) : Marcello Mimmi
- (1933–1950) : Francesco Maria Franco
- (1950–1953) : Giuseppe Piazzi
- (1953–1963) : Placido Maria Cambiaghi, B.
- (1963) : Franco Costa
- (1963–1981) : Carlo Manziana, C.O.
- (1981–1996) ; Libero Tresoldi
- (1996–2004) : Angelo Paravisi
- (2005–2016) : Oscar Cantoni
- (2017–pres.) : Daniele Gianotti

== Parishes ==
The 62 parishes of the diocese are all located in the Province of Cremona, Lombardy. In 2013 in the diocese of Crema there was one priest for every 1,000 Catholics.

== Bibliography ==
- Barbieri, Luigi Compendio cronologico della storia di Crema (Crema, 1888)
- Cappelletti, Giuseppe (1857). Le Chiese d'Italia dalla loro origine sino ai nostri giorni, (in Latin) Venezia, 1857, vol. XII, pp. 241–275.
- Eubel, Conradus; Gulik, Guilelmus (1923). Hierarchia catholica, Tomus 3 (in Latin) (second ed.). Münster: Libreria Regensbergiana.
- Gams, Pius Bonifatius (1873). Series episcoporum Ecclesiae catholicae: quotquot innotuerunt a beato Petro apostolo (in Latin). Ratisbon: Typis et Sumptibus Georgii Josephi Manz.
- Gauchat, Patritius (Patrice) (1935). Hierarchia catholica IV (1592-1667). Münster: Libraria Regensbergiana.
- Lasagni, Ilaria (2008). Chiese, conventi e monasteri in Crema e nel suo territorio dall'inizio del dominio veneto alla fondazione della diocesi: repertorio di enti ecclesiastici tra XV e XVI secolo (in Italian). Milano: UNICOPLI. ISBN 9788840012575.
- Ritzler, Remigius; Sefrin, Pirminus (1952). Hierarchia catholica medii et recentis aevi V (1667-1730). Patavii: Messagero di S. Antonio.
- Ritzler, Remigius; Sefrin, Pirminus (1958). Hierarchia catholica medii et recentis aevi VI (1730-1799). Patavii: Messagero di S. Antonio.
- Sforza Benvenuti, Francesco (1859). Storia di Crema. Vol. primo, Volume secondo. Milano: tipi di G. Bernardoni di Gio.
- Solera, Giovanni (1857). Serie dei Vescovi di Crema, con notizie sulla erezione del Vescovado (in Italian). Milano: Antonio Ronchetti.
- Zaccaria, Francisco Antonio (1763). Cremenensium episcoporum series a Ferdinando Ughellio primum contexta, deinde a Nicolao Coleto paululum aucta, nunc a Francisco Antonio Zaccaria S. J. ... illustrata, emendata atque in hunc diem perducta (in Latin). Brescia: Rizzardi.
