= Libero Tresoldi =

Italian prelate and bishop of Crema

- Bishop of Crema
- Church: Catholic Church
- Diocese: Diocese of Crema
- In office: 10 December 1981 – 11 July 1996
- Predecessor: Carlo Manziana
- Successor: Angelo Paravisi
- Previous posts: Titular Bishop of Altinum (1970-1981); Auxiliary Bishop of Milan (1970-1981)

Orders
- Ordination: 29 May 1943 by Alfredo Ildefonso Schuster
- Consecration: 22 November 1970 by Giovanni Colombo

Personal details
- Born: 18 January 1921 Rivolta d'Adda, Province of Cremona, Kingdom of Italy
- Died: 22 October 2009 (aged 88) Milan, Province of Milan, Italy

Libero Tresoldi (18 January 1921 – 22 October 2009) was an Italian prelate, who was the bishop of Crema.

Born at Rivolta d'Adda, he later moved to Milan with his family.

Ordained a priest on 29 May 1943, Tresoldi was appointed auxiliary bishop of the Roman Catholic Archdiocese of Milan on 28 September 1970 and was ordained bishop on 22 November 1970. Bishop Tresoldi was appointed bishop of Crema on 10 December 1981 and retired on 11 July 1996.

He died in Milan in 2009.

== Notes ==
Catholic Church titles
| Preceded by Carlo Manziana | Bishop of Crema; 1981 - 1996 | Succeeded by Angelo Paravisi |
