= Girolamo Diedo =

Bishop of Crema from 1580 to 1584

- Bishop of Crema
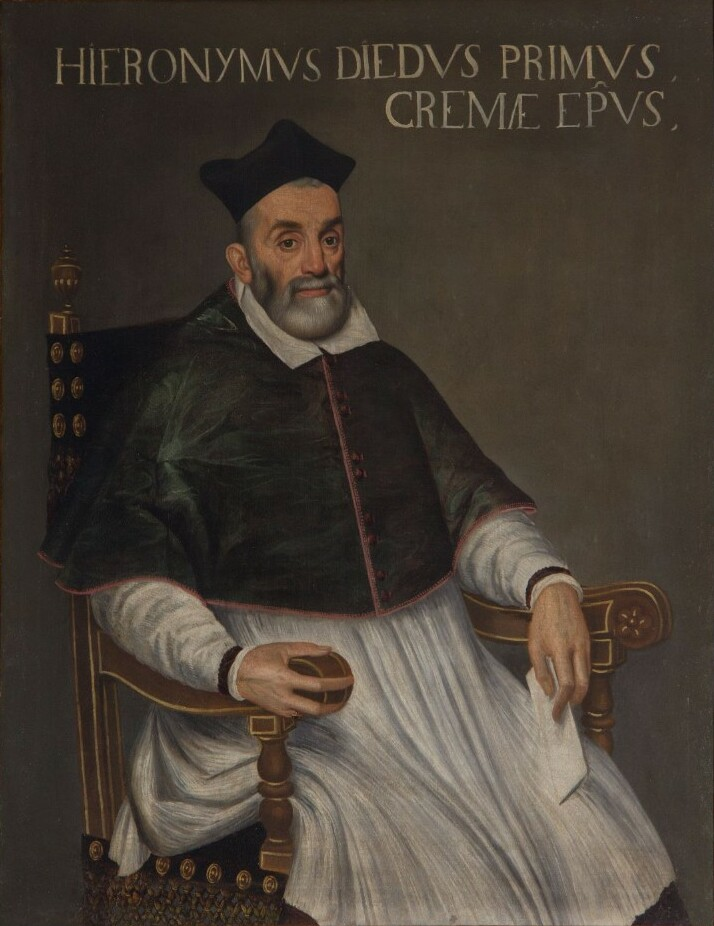
- Church: Catholic Church
- See: Bishop of Crema
- Appointed: 21 November 1580
- Term ended: 28 May 1584
- Successor: Gian Giacomo Diedo

Orders
- Consecration: 9 April 1581 (Bishop) by Girolamo Vielmi

Personal details
- Born: c. 1522 Venice, Republic of Venice
- Died: 10 June 1585 (aged 62–63) Venice

Girolamo Diedo (Latin: Hieronymus Diedus, c. 1522–1585) was the first bishop of Crema, in office from 1580 to 1584.

== Life ==
Girolamo was born around 1522 in Venice to the noble Diedo family. His uncle Vincenzo served as Patriarch of Venice from 1556 to 1559. On 6 May 1556, Girolamo entered the chapter of the cathedral of Padua, where, in 1567, he was appointed Primicerius ('first priest').

Crema is a town in Lombardy located between Milan and Cremona. In the 16th century, it was governed by the Republic of Venice, while Cremona was part of the Duchy of Milan. Ecclesiastically, its territory was divided among the dioceses of Lodi, Cremona, and Piacenza. As early as 1450, Venice petitioned the Pope to elevate Crema to the status of an autonomous diocese, a request reiterated in 1472, 1497, 1545, and 1563. When Bishop Girolamo Federici of Lodi died in 1579, Pope Gregory XIII, with the papal bull In supereminenti dated 9 December 1579, set aside the Cremasque territory. On March 4, 1580, the Municipality of Crema presented the Pope with a palace as a gift, intended to serve as the future episcopal residence. Finally, with the papal bull Super Universas issued on 11 April 1580, Gregory XIII established the Diocese of Crema as a suffragan of the Archdiocese of Milan. On 21 November of the same year, the pope officially appointed Girolamo Diedo as its first bishop.

Girolamo Diedo was consecrated as bishop in Venice by Girolamo Vielmi, bishop of Cittanova and suffragan of Padua, on 9 April 1581. He entered Crema on 19 May 1581, where he was joyfully received by the entire population and the city's government.

His ministry in Crema was brief. After contracting tertian fever, he returned to his native Venice. On May 28, 1584, he resigned from his episcopal office in favor of his nephew, Gian Giacomo Diedo. Girolamo Diedo died in Venice on June 10, 1585, and was buried in the Church of Santa Caterina.
