= Angelo Paravisi =

Catholic bishop

- Bishop of Crema
- Church: Catholic Church
- Diocese: Diocese of Crema
- In office: 11 July 1996 – 2 September 2004
- Predecessor: Libero Tresoldi
- Successor: Oscar Cantoni
- Previous posts: Titular Bishop of Turris in Proconsulari (1988-1996); Auxiliary Bishop of Bergamo (1988-1996)

Orders
- Ordination: 30 May 1953 by Giuseppe Maggi
- Consecration: 25 June 1988 by Giulio Oggioni

Personal details
- Born: 15 September 1930 Colognola, Bergamo, Province of Bergamo, Kingdom of Italy
- Died: 2 September 2004 (aged 73) Crema, Province of Cremona, Italy

Styles of angelo Paravisi
- Reference style: The Most Reverend
- Spoken style: Your Excellency
- Religious style: Monsignor
- Posthumous style: none

Angelo Paravisi (15 September 1930 – 2 September 2004) was the bishop of Crema from 1996 to 2004.

== Life ==
Born in Bergamo in the quarter of Colognola, he attended the seminary and was ordained priest for the Diocese of Bergamo in 1953. After his ordination he held various posts in his native diocese, then from 1964 to 1970 he led the Azione Cattolica of his diocese. From 1976 to 1988 he led the parish of Seriate and in 1988 pope John Paul II named him auxiliary bishop of the Diocese of Bergamo. In 1996 he was named bishop of Crema. He died on 2 September 2004 at the age of 73.

Preceded by Libero Tresoldi	Bishop of Crema; 1996–2004	Succeeded by Oscar Cantoni
