= Pietro Emo =

1xth-century Catholic bishop

Most Reverend Pietro Emo
- Bishop of Crema
- Church: Catholic Church
- Diocese: Diocese of Crema
- In office: 1616–1629
- Predecessor: Gian Giacomo Diedo
- Successor: Marcantonio Bragadin (cardinal)
- Previous post: Titular Bishop of Larissa in Syria (1612–1616)

Orders
- Ordination: 1592
- Consecration: 8 Jul 1612 by Giovanni Delfino (camerlengo)

Personal details
- Born: 1573 Venice, Italy
- Died: 28 Sep 1629 (age 56)

Pietro Emo, C.R. (1573–1629) was a Roman Catholic prelate who served as Bishop of Crema (1616–1629) and Titular Bishop of Larissa in Syria (1612–1616).

== Biography ==
Pietro Emo was born in Venice, Italy in 1573 and ordained a priest in the Congregation of Clerics Regular of the Divine Providence in 1592. On 4 Jul 1612, he was appointed during the papacy of Pope Paul V as Titular Bishop of Larissa in Syria and Coadjutor Bishop of Crema. On 8 Jul 1612, he was consecrated bishop by Giovanni Delfino (camerlengo), Cardinal-Priest of San Marco, with Attilio Amalteo, Titular Archbishop of Athenae, and Giovanni Battista del Tufo, Bishop Emeritus of Acerra, serving as co-consecrators. On 6 Jun 1616, he succeeded to the bishopric. He served as Bishop of Crema until his death on 28 Sep 1629.

== External links and additional sources ==
- Cheney, David M. "Larissa in Syria (Titular See)". Catholic-Hierarchy.org. (for Chronology of Bishops) ^{[self-published]}
- Chow, Gabriel. "Titular Metropolitan See of Larissa in Thessalia (Greece)". GCatholic.org. (for Chronology of Bishops) ^{[self-published]}
- Cheney, David M. "Diocese of Crema". Catholic-Hierarchy.org. (for Chronology of Bishops) ^{[self-published]}
- Chow, Gabriel. "Diocese of Crema (Italy)". GCatholic.org. (for Chronology of Bishops) ^{[self-published]}

Catholic Church titles
| Preceded by | Titular Bishop of Larissa in Syria; 1612–1616 | Succeeded by |
| Preceded by Gian Giacomo Diedo | Bishop of Crema; 1616–1629 | Succeeded by Marcantonio Bragadin |
