= Colognola =

Frazione of Italy

Coordinates: 45°40′20″N 9°39′47″E

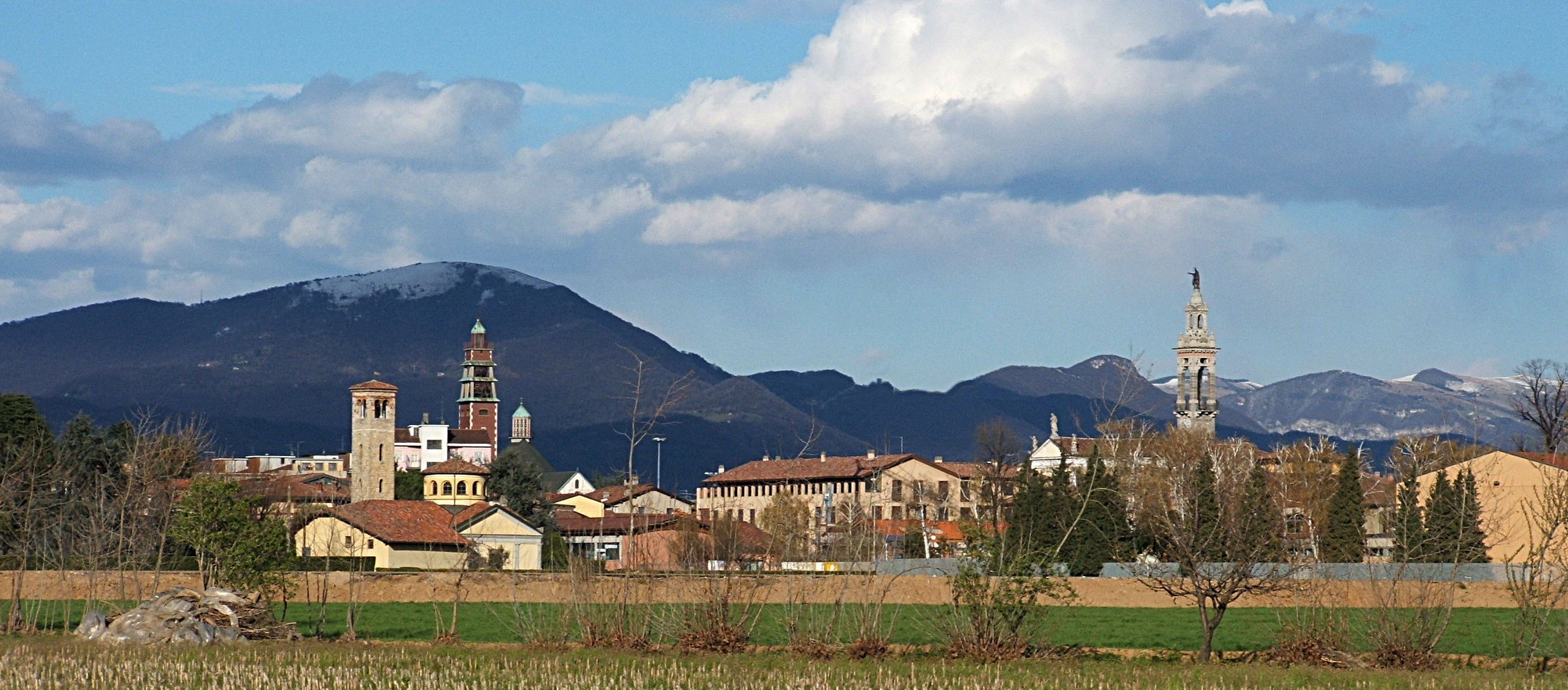
Colognola

Colognola is a quarter of the city of Bergamo.

== Geography ==
The quarter of Colognola is in the south part of the side close to the motorway Milan Venice also named A4.

== History ==
There has been a village in the Colognola area since the 12th century but only in the late 19th century the quarter become to growth due to the creation of some industries there.

Currently the quarter has a population of about 15,000 person and is served by the Roman Catholic Parish of San Sisto V.

Orio al Serio Airport lies about 1 km to the south.
