= Francesco Bissolo =

Italian painter

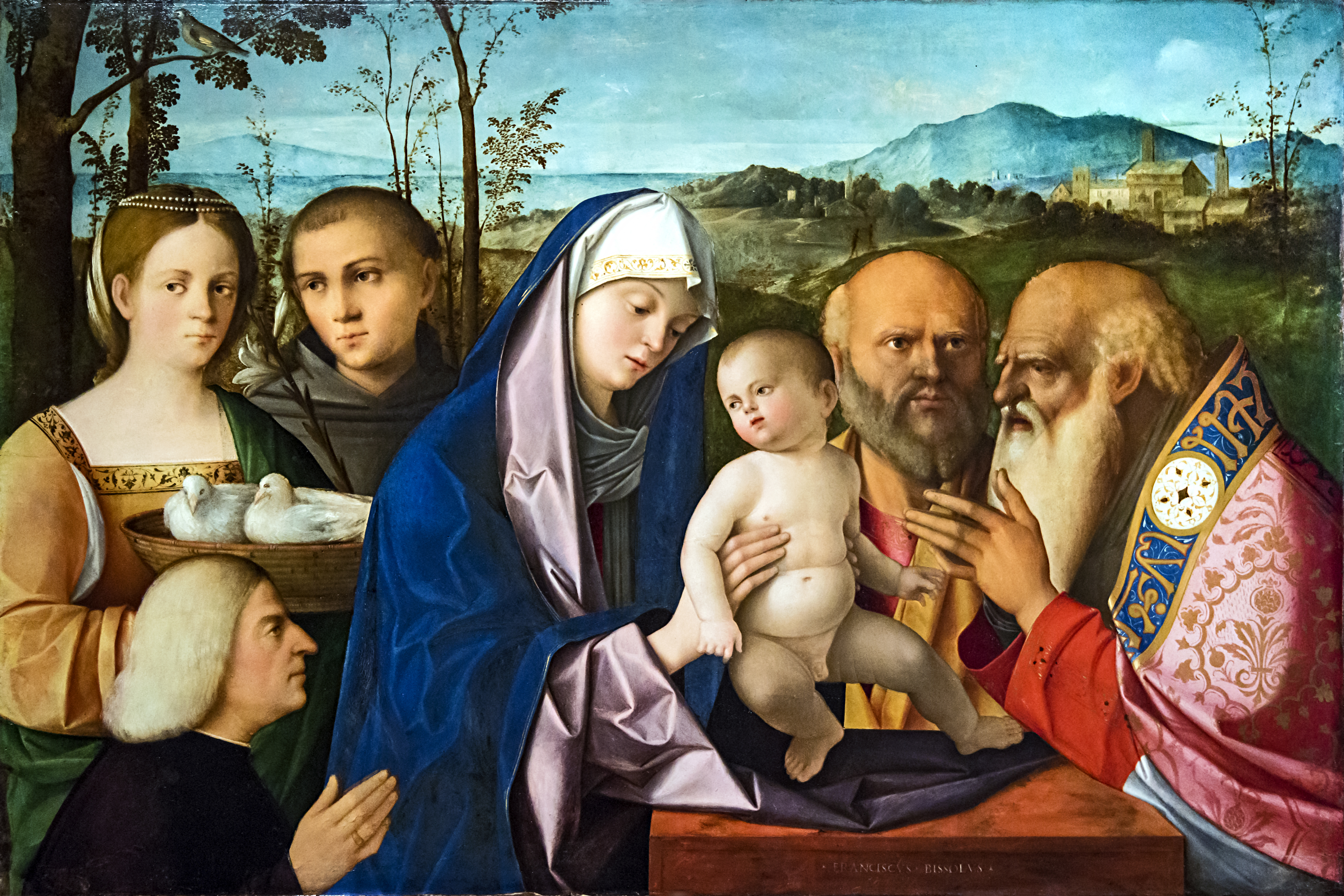
- Presentation of Jesus at the temple , Gallerie dell'Accademia
- Born: 1470–72
- Died: 20 April 1554

Francesco Bissolo (1470-72 - 20 April 1554) was a Venetian painter of the Renaissance. He is also known as Pier Francesco Bissolo.

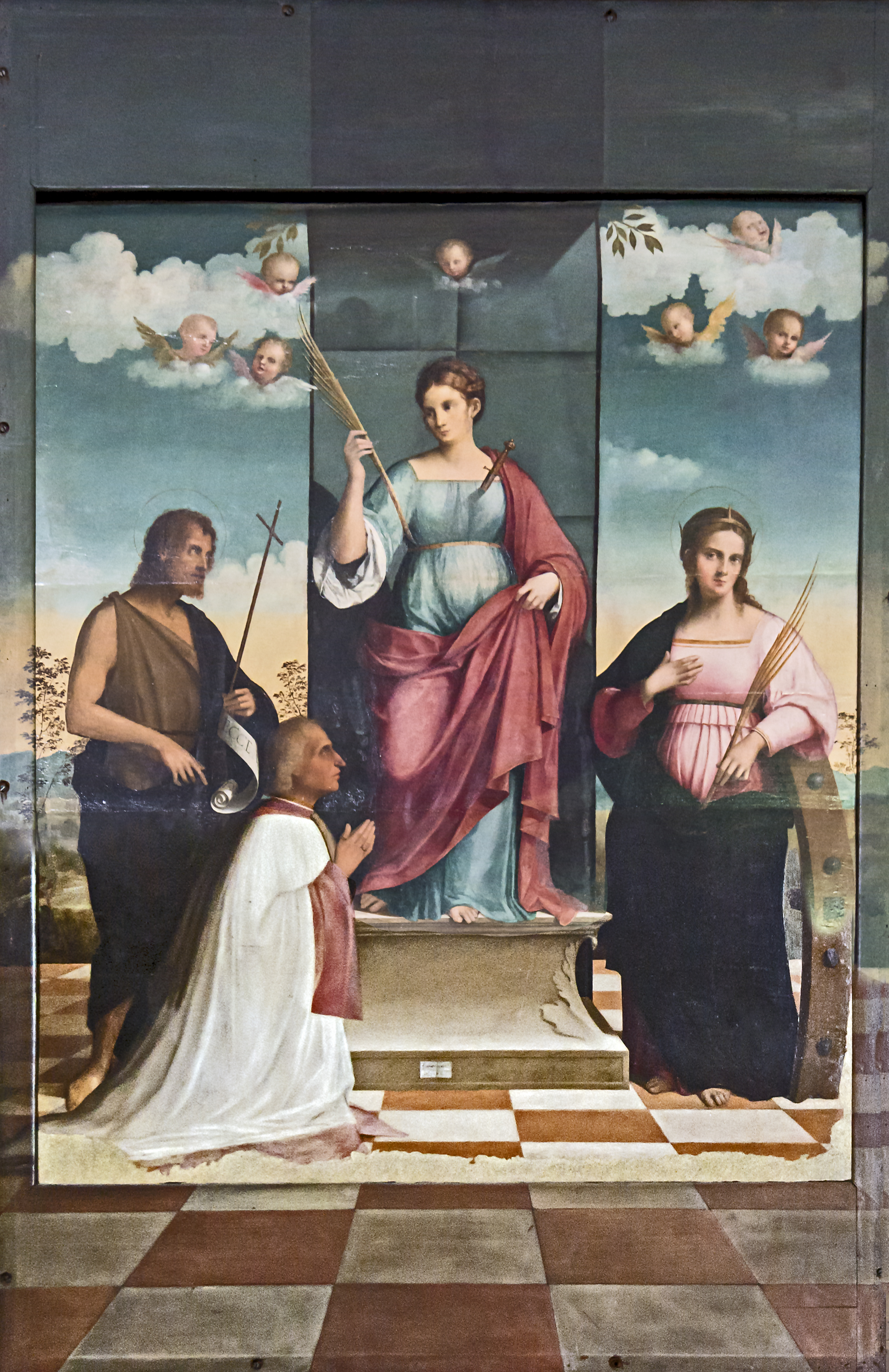
Santa Giustina in Treviso Cathedral

He is described as a pupil of Giovanni Bellini. He painted a Christ exchanging crown of thorns for crown of gold with St. Catherine for the church of il Redentore, now at the Gallerie dell'Accademia in Venice, and a Santa Giustina in Treviso cathedral. He painted a Holy Family with donor in landscape found at the Dayton Art Institute in Ohio, United States.

He died in the contrada of S. Marciliano on 20 April 1554 after six months of illness.

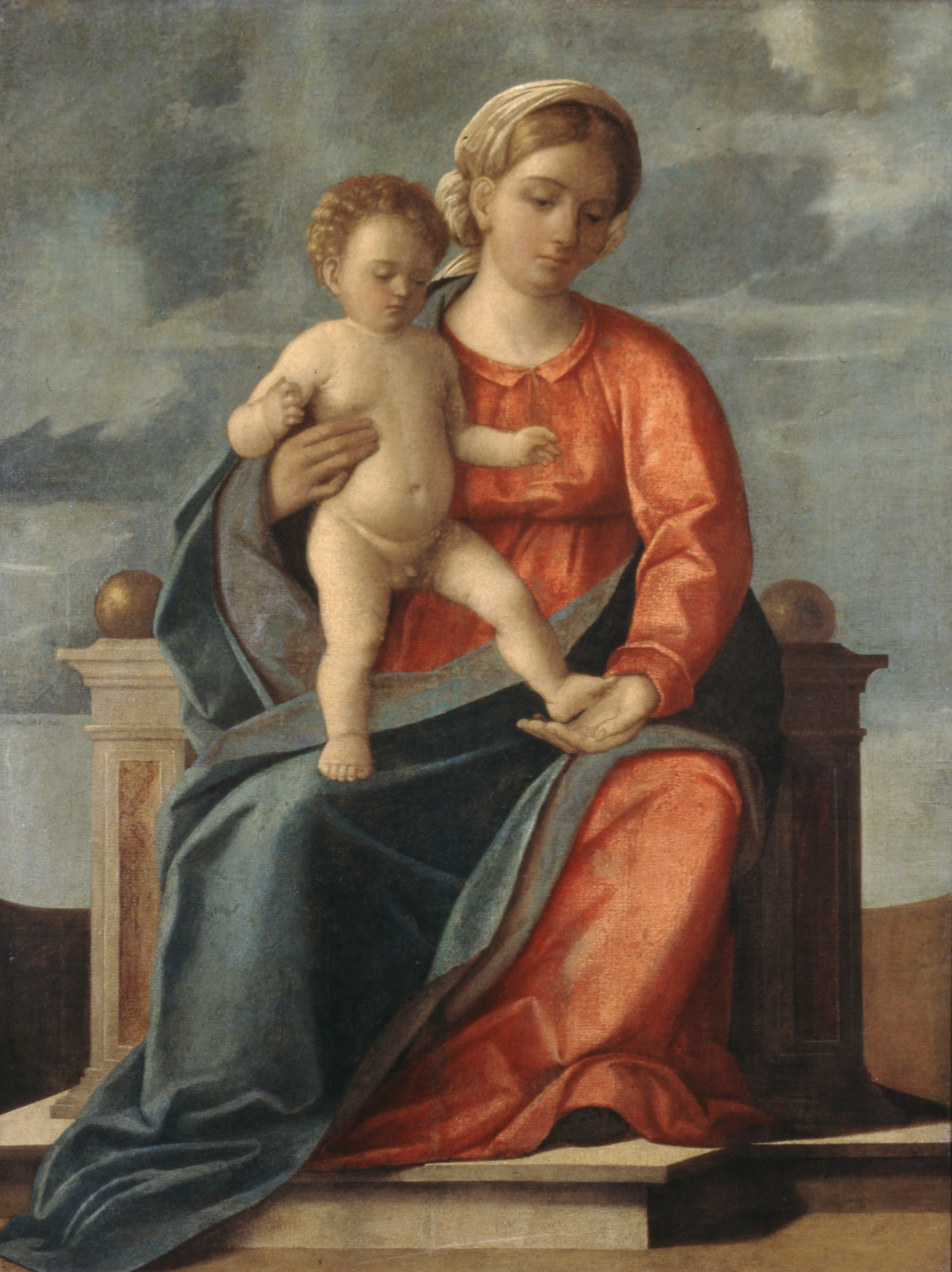
Mother and Child in the collection of the Beecroft Art Gallery
