= Mauro Picenardi =

Italian painter

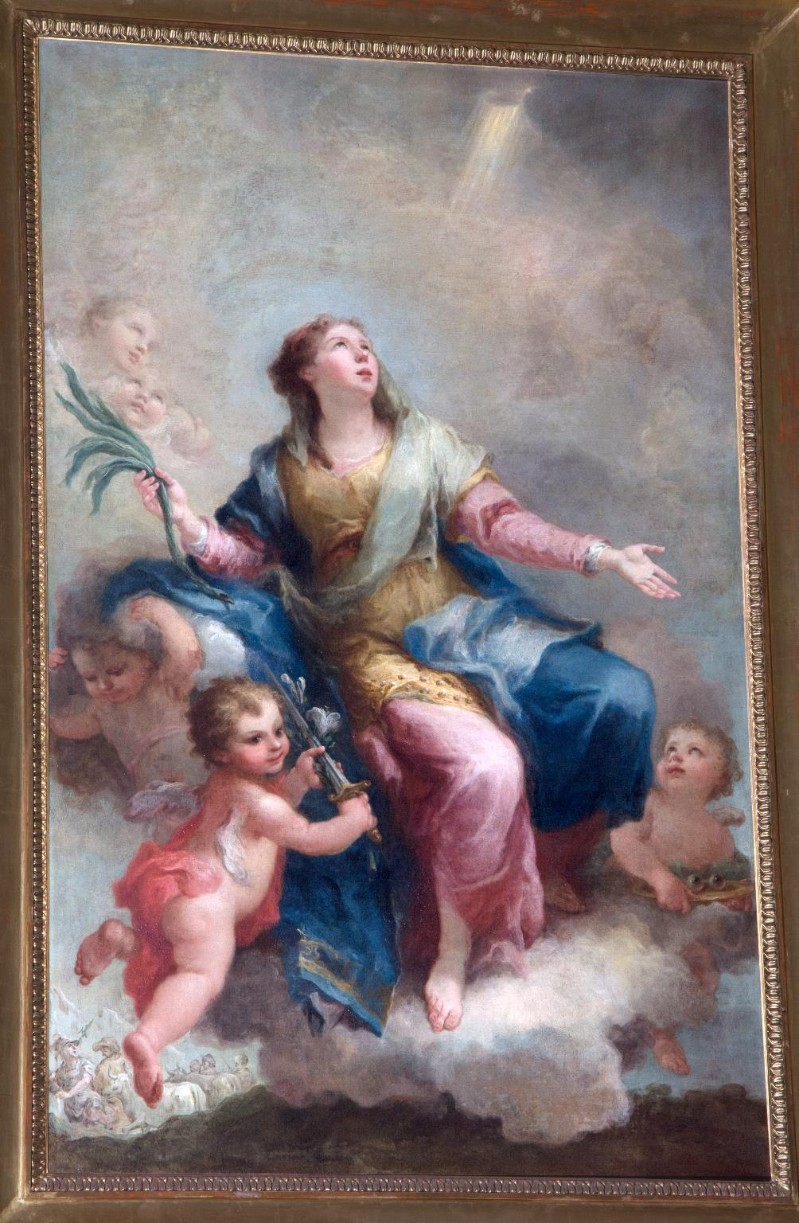
Saint Lucy by Mauro Picenardi, San Giacomo Maggiore, Bologna

Mauro Picenardi (1735 in Crema, Lombardy – May 30, 1809 in Bergamo) was an Italian painter.

== Biography ==
He was the son of the Cremonese painter Tommaso Picenardi, He also trained with Gianbettino Cignaroli in the latter's academy in Verona. In 1776, he painted three altarpieces for the Duomo of Cremona, depicting St Lucy, The Visitation and San Pantaleone. Ticozzi thought he was related to the family of Carlo Picenardi, a 17th-century painter.

Mauro Picenardi's oil-on-canvas picture Venus and Juno sold for $74,000 in a 1997 auction in New York City.
