= The Knight in Pink =

Painting by Giovanni Battista Moroni

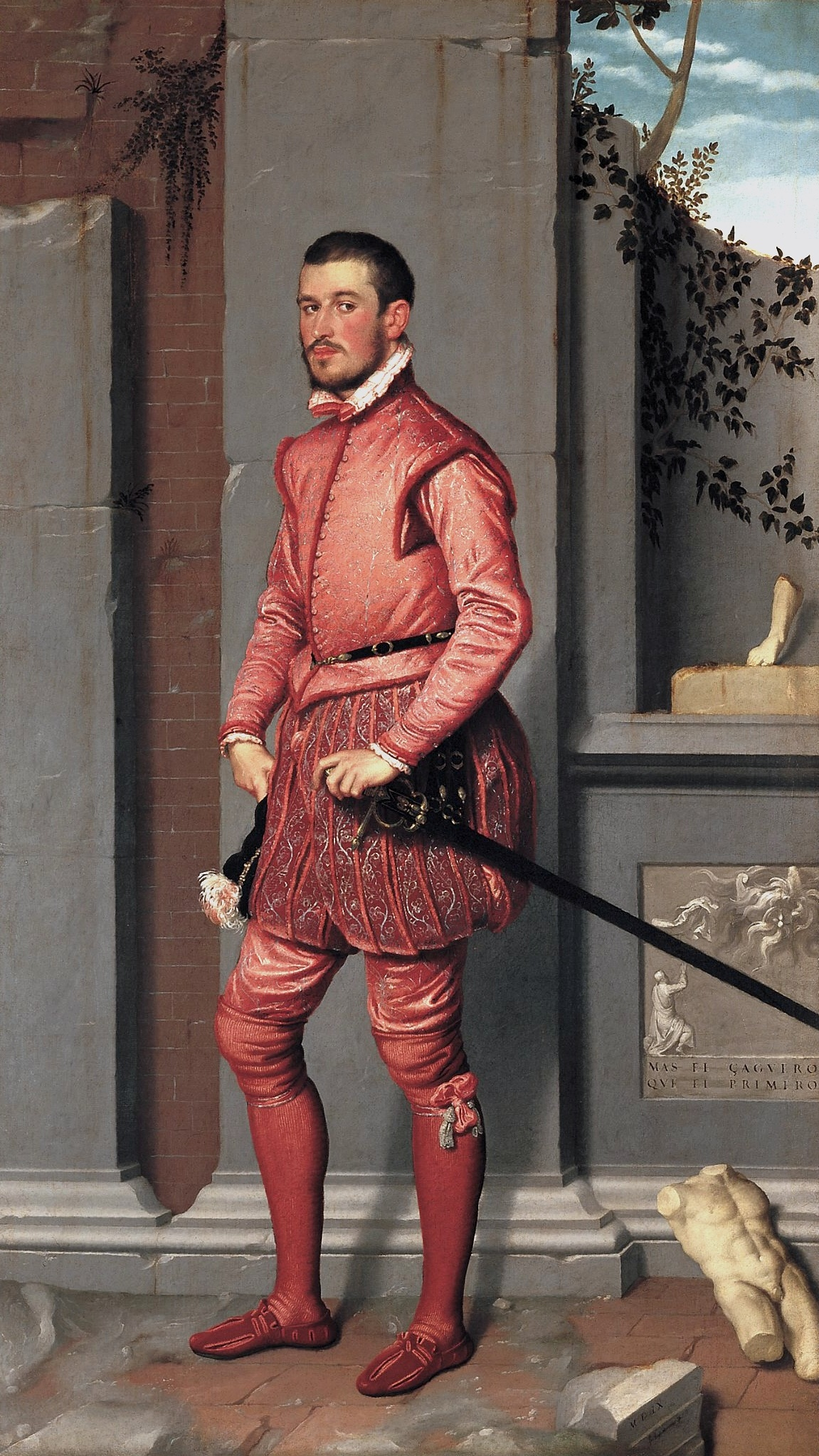
- Artist: Giovanni Battista Moroni
- Year: 1560
- Medium: oil on canvas
- Dimensions: 216 cm × 123 cm (85 in × 48 in)
- Location: Palazzo Moroni, Bergamo

The Knight in Pink is an oil on canvas painting by Italian painter Giovanni Battista Moroni, from 1560. It depicts a nobleman, Gian Gerolamo Grumelli, and is one of the artist's best-known portraits. It is held in the Palazzo Moroni, in Bergamo.

== History ==
The knight in pink of the portrait was identified as Gian Gerolamo Grumelli, aged 24 years old, of Bergamo by the historian Giuseppe Locatelli Milesi, from the description by Foresti of the Palazzo Moroni: "(...) located at the head of the main staircase, the portrait of Giangerolamo in full figure dressed in Spanish style (...) admirable creation of the illustrious brush of Gianbattista Moroni from Bergamo".

The painting was owned by the Grumelli family, until his descendant Marcantonio Fermo Grumelli offered it to the Moroni family in 1871, together with the painting representing Gian Gerolamo's second wife Isotta Brembati. The sitter was a person of considerable importance in Bergamo, since he was president of the Paci Court, of the hospital, and of the Pio place of the Magnifica Pietà.

The Spanish-style clothing that the subject wears in the painting is a testimony of the Spanish influence in the fashion of the time. It is worth considering that, in addition to perhaps being favorable to the Spanish party, he also had excellent relations with representatives of the local church. There is much correspondence between him and Cardinal Charles Borromeo, while Bergamo was governed by the Venetians.

== Description ==
The clothing is particularly striking: he wears a jacket, with a short collar at the waist, from which a light closed belly of the black belt emerges, while the trousers are in the Castilian style, which are lengthened with elements box-neck up to the knees, and the stockings are supported by garters.

The knight holds a plumed hat in his left hand which runs along his side, while he has the hilt of the sword in his right hand, thus seeming to remind Titian's portraits of the Spanish court.

The intensity and uniqueness of the color are a choice not only by Moroni, but also by the client; its perhaps a portrait requested on the occasion of his second wedding, since the portrait of the bride is from the same period. The face of the knight appears well-groomed, like also his beard and hairdo, while his gaze is severe and intense, as if not ashamed of the redness of the cheeks, a redness that echoes that of his clothing. He appears in an environment that seems to have been studied but it is not real.

Alongside, in bas-relief, there is an inscription in Spanish with an interpretation that is disputed: "Mas el çagnero que el primero (better to be the second, or the last, than the first)". It gives a moral warning, and the ivy or the broken statue would also refer to this, if the portrait had been commissioned for the second marriage of both the spouses, then the interpretation that it refers to it would seem valid.

The canvas is part of the paintings from the time when Moroni studied the poses and colors of the clients, being perhaps his most extreme and mature research, a research that he would abandon after leaving Bergamo, moving to Albino. He would be there working on simpler models, forcing him to search for a greater simplicity in figures but with a greater intensity.
