= Roncelli =

Roncelli is an Italian surname. Notable people of this name include the following:

- Antonella Roncelli (born 1959), Italian swimmer
- Giuseppe Roncelli (1661–1729), Italian priest and painter
