= Ombriano =

Village in Cremona, Lombardy, Italy

Coordinates: 45.355°N 9.651°E

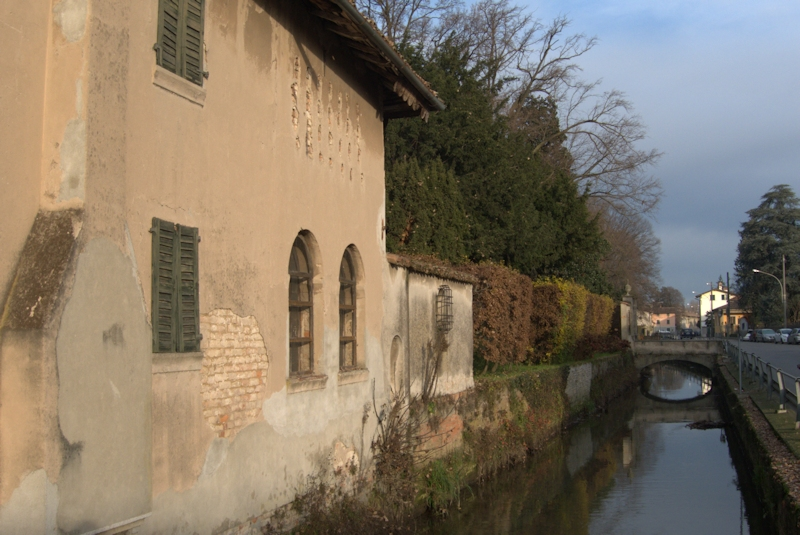
View along the canal

Ombriano (called Umbrià in the local dialect) is a village which forms a suburban district of Crema, in the province of Cremona, in the region of Lombardy in Italy. It is located 1.95 kilometers west of Crema proper, along the road to Lodi.

== History ==
The locality is mentioned for the first time in 1092. It was then an agricultural village located along the road to Lodi. In the Napoleonic age (1809–16), Ombriano became a part of Crema, but recovered its autonomy with the establishment of the Kingdom of Lombardy–Venetia in 1815.

At the time of the Italian unification in 1861 the village had 1,544 inhabitants. In 1865 the Municipality of Porta Ombriano was merged with the Municipality of Ombriano. In 1928 the Municipality of Ombriano was definitively annexed to Crema.

== Monuments and places of interest ==
=== Religious architecture ===
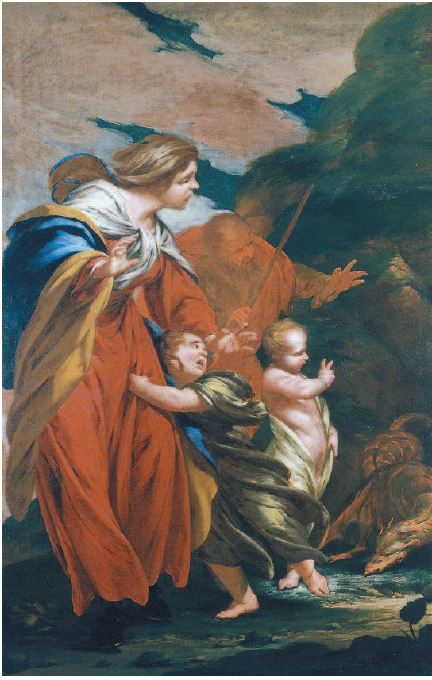
Christ calms the dragons by Giovanni Battista Lucini in the Parish church

The parish church of Santa Maria Assunta dates back to 1779 and is completely in brick. Its interior is decorated by Angelo Bacchetta in 1890. In the altars are kept paintings which were originally located in other churches including Christ calms the dragons and Mary fed by the palm by Giovanni Battista Lucini, the series on the Life of Mary by Giovanni Giacomo Barbelli, a Miracle of St. Anthony from Padua by Tommaso Pombioli, a Presentation of Jesus at the Temple by Giambettino Cignaroli, a Martyrdom of St. John the Evangelist by Palma il Giovane, a Madonna with Child attributed to Callisto Piazza, a Madonna with Saint Gottardo and Santa Barbara by Vittoriano Urbino. The Stations of the Cross are the work of Fra Luigi Cerioli.

=== Civil architecture ===
The Villa Benvenuti Clavelli is an elegant baroque building, which is made completely in exposed brick. It was built by the family of the Counts Clavelli and has belonged since 1818 to the branch known today as "di Ombriano", one of the most illustrious families of the Province of Cremona.

Villa Rossi is a grand palace of neo-Gothic style, rebuilt in the nineteenth century by Count Vincenzo Toffetti, which since has belonged to the Rossi Martini family, Senator Mario Crespi who during the Second World War moved there to edit and print the Corriere della Sera.
