= Santa Maria Assunta, Ombriano =

Church in Ombriano, Italy

Santa Maria Assunta is the Roman Catholic parish church of Ombriano, a suburb of Crema, region of Lombardy, Italy.

A church at the site is documented from the 11th century, but the present brick structure was built on the same foundations from 1786 to circa 1797. It was dedicated to the Madonna of the Assumption.

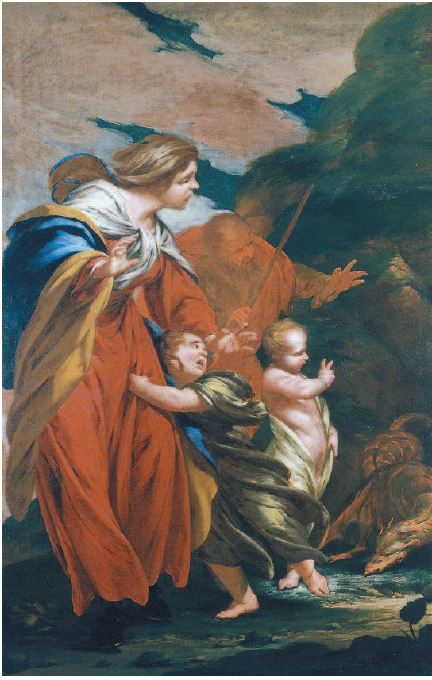
Christ calms the dragons by GB Lucini

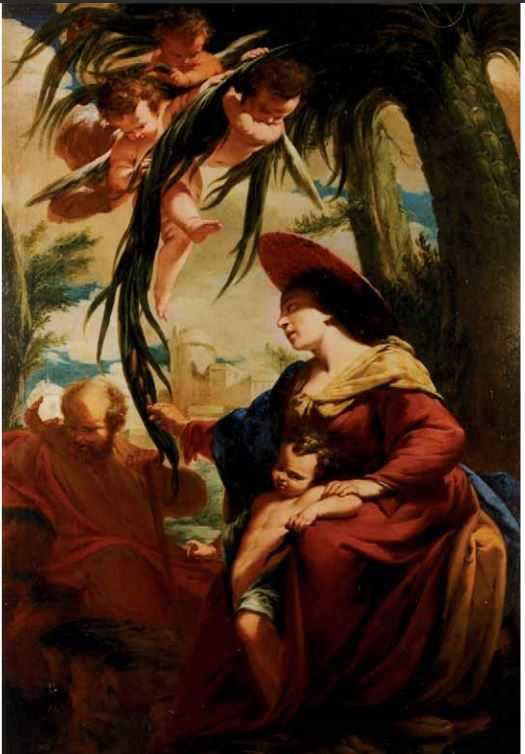
Mary fed by the palm also by Lucini

Its interior was decorated in 1890 by Angelo Bacchetta. The church acquired a number of altarpieces derived from suppressed churches and religious buildings, including:

- Works by Giovanni Battista Lucini
- Scenes from Life of Mary by Giovanni Giacomo Barbelli
- Miracle of St Anthony of Padua by Tommaso Pombioli
- Presentation of Jesus at the Temple by Giambettino Cignaroli
- Martyrdom of St John the Evangelist by Palma il Giovane
- Madonna and Child attributed to Callisto Piazza
- Madonna with Saint Gottardo and Santa Barbara by Vittoriano Urbino
- Stations of the Cross by Fra Luigi Cerioli.
