= Santa Maria delle Grazie, Crema =

Church in Crema, Italy

Coordinates: 45°21′37″N 9°41′02″E

Sanctuary of Santa Maria delle Grazie
- Santuario di Santa Maria delle Grazie
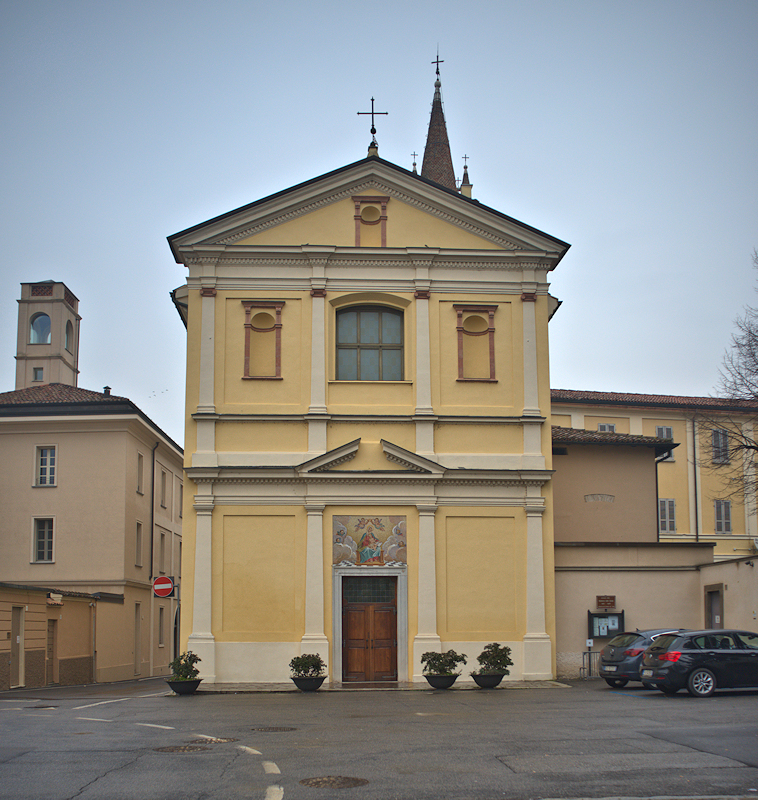
- The facade
- Sanctuary of Santa Maria delle Grazie
- Location: Crema, Lombardy, Italy
- Denomination: Catholic

History
- Consecrated: 1609

Architecture
- Groundbreaking: 1601
- Completed: Before 1609

Administration
- Diocese: Roman Catholic Diocese of Crema

The sanctuary of the Madonna delle Grazie (Cremish dialect: santüare dale Grasie) is a place of Marian worship located in Crema.

== Location ==
The sanctuary is located in the historic center, at the southern limits of the fortified city near the Venetian walls. The open space in front of the church, which was later extended with the opening of the walls into a street, was called Via dello Spitale in ancient times and the name was changed in 1931 to the current Via delle Grazie.

== Origins ==
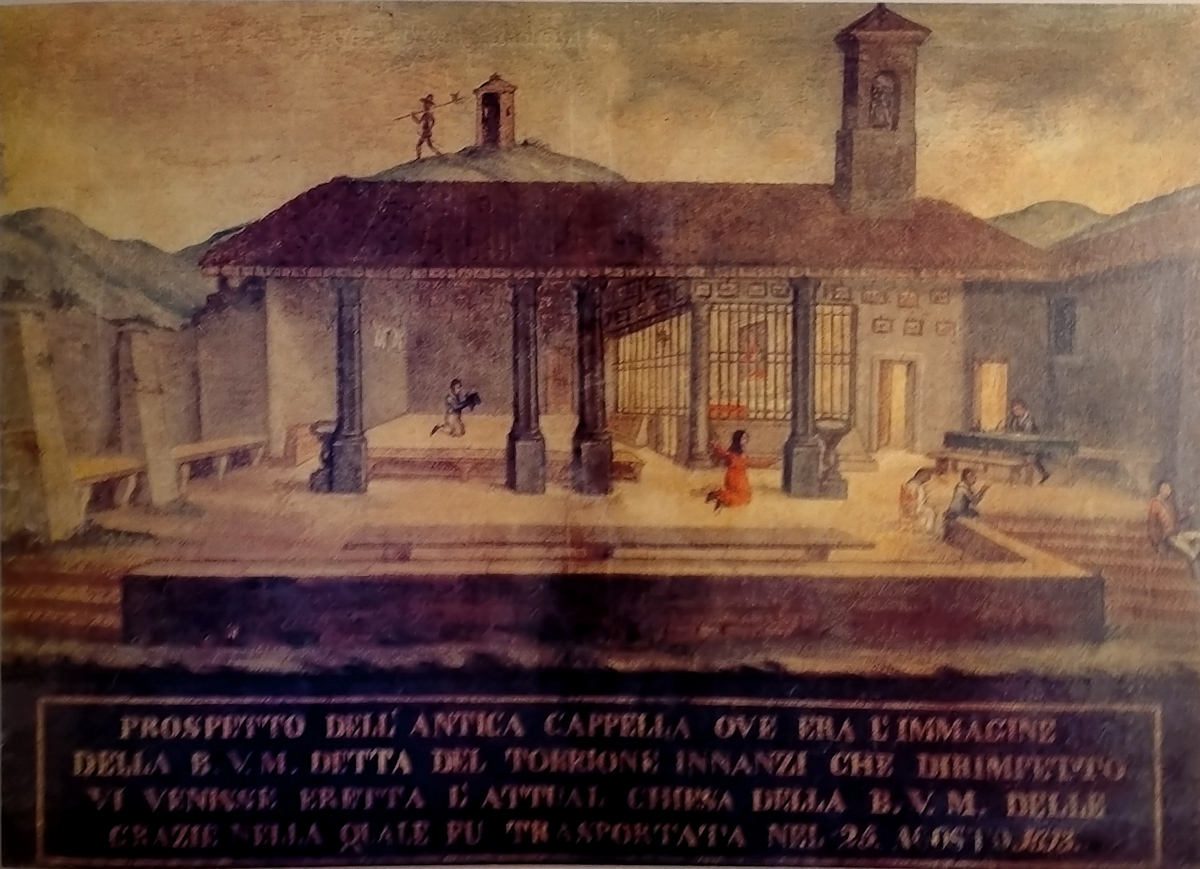
The ancient portico, which was later demolished, protected the votive image placed on the Venetian walls that were later moved to the sanctuary; it is painted on a canvas kept in the sacristy.

The origins of the cult are not based on a Marian apparition but on devotion to a votive image. Near the present church, inside the Torrione del Miliato (from the convent of the Humiliati), an image depicting a Madonna and Child had been painted by a certain Giovanni da Caravaggio during the 15th century. The image was later protected by a canopy with an altar and, later, a portico with a gate. Only later, in 1537, were miracles reported: in the same year the school of the Santissimo Sacramento of the church of the Santissima Trinità placed itself under the protection of the fresco, taking care of the place. The acts of the Castelli visit of 1579 call it Santa Maria del Toresino, those of the visitor Regazzoni of 1583 Santa Mariae de Turione in Civitatis.

The location, however, was not very appropriate: the risk of war forced the civil authorities to continuously maintain the city's defensive apparatus with reinforcements and modernizations, a task that endangered the existence of the votive icon. Military experts repeatedly warned the ecclesiastical authorities that they might have to demolish the portico to change the place where the sacred image stood.

At the end of the 16th century the ancient church of Saints Philip and James, annexed to the former convent of the Humiliati (the order had been suppressed by Pope Pius V in 1567), had been demolished. The area was purchased for 4,000 Lire by the Santissimo Sacramento consortium with the specific aim of building a church and transferring the votive image there and, thanks also to numerous donations, the construction of a new building could begin in 1601.

The church was completed in 1609 and in 1613 the fresco on the tower was detached and transferred to the new building.

== Historical and architectural events ==
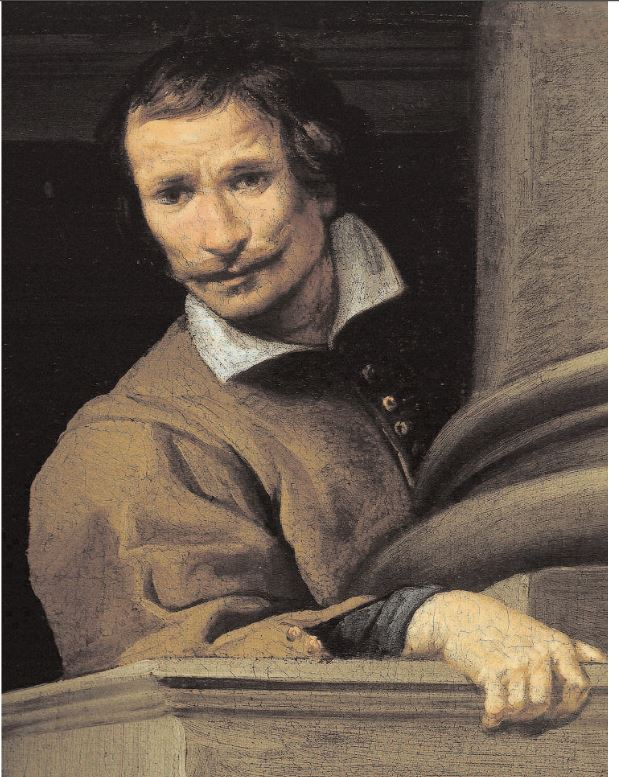
Gian Giacomo Barbelli, self-portrait

The laying of the foundation stone is dated June 1, 1601 and the construction of the church lasted for nine years due to various factors, including a famine and the allocation of funds to the construction of the church and the convent of the Poor Converted.

In 1606 the bell tower was completed and in 1609 the church was consecrated; in 1613 the sacred image was transferred there in the presence of religious authorities (led by the Bishop of Crema, Monsignor Gian Giacomo Diedo), civil authorities (the Podestà and Captain Pietro Capello and the Superintendent Pietro Bondemier), the Superintendents and the faithful. The sources that have come down to us are uncertain as to the date on which the image was moved: January 18, July 25 or August 25.

After 1620 the church was provided with a crucifix, a gate separating the nave from the presbytery, a choir and an organ above the main entrance in 1628.

In 1641 Gian Giacomo Barbelli was given the task of frescoing the entire interior of the church: a job he completed in two years.

There are no reports of significant events in the sanctuary until the 19th century: the church, being a subsidiary of the parish church of the Holy Trinity, avoided demolition during the Napoleonic era; however, at the beginning of the 19th century, the consortium of the Holy Sacrament was suppressed and the church was administered by a special committee. Furthermore, in 1804, a new set of bells cast by the Crespi company was installed.

In 1824 the gate was dismantled and a new altar was built, with the consequent removal of the ancient and venerated image and the installation of two marble statues.

Between 1834 and 1835 a new organ was installed by the Serassi company of Bergamo (the year the old instrument was installed is not known) and the new choir loft by Giovanni Annessa.

On October 26, 1891, at the request of the bishop of Crema, Monsignor Francesco Sabbia, the Vatican Chapter granted the coronation of the image of the Madonna and Child: restoration work was carried out and the paintings were restored by the painter Angelo Bacchetta. The official ceremony took place on September 8, 1892, in the presence of Monsignor de Neckere of the Vatican Chapter and Monsignor Geremia Bonomelli, bishop of Cremona. Two days later, on September 11, the bishop of Mantua, Monsignor Giuseppe Melchiorre Sarto, the future Pope Pius X, celebrated a solemn pontifical mass there.

In 1894 the church was detached from the parish of the Holy Trinity and placed under the direct jurisdiction of the bishop, as it still is today, except for the period between 1941 and 1977 when the church was run by the Comboni Missionaries.

=== The former convent ===
As mentioned above, the church stands on the site where another place of worship dedicated to Saints Philip and James and run by the Humiliati friars once stood, and was demolished in 1583. On the side, in the former convent, in 1616 Monsignor Pietro Emo decided to transfer the seminary there, while his successor Monsignor Faustino Griffoni had it demolished, acquired some adjacent buildings using family assets and had it rebuilt. Bishops Lodovico Calini and Marcantonio Lombardi also ordered extensions. The Cisalpine Republic requisitioned it in 1797 and the seminarians found refuge in the bishop's palace; they returned a few years later under the episcopate of Monsignor Tommaso Ronna, remaining there until 1937 when Monsignor Francesco Maria Franco inaugurated a new seminary. The building was then sold to the Comboni Missionaries of the Sacred Heart, who lived there and also officiated in the sanctuary until 1977, when it was sold to the province of Cremona to be used as a school.

== The church ==
=== Exterior ===
The façade has two orders: the lower one is divided by slightly projecting pilasters that divide the order into three parts; in the center is the entrance surmounted by a mosaic from 1955. An architrave with a broken tympanum rests on the pilasters. The upper level has the same layout as the lower one: in the center there is a large window and on the sides there are empty niches. Above the second architrave there is a triangular tympanum.

The bell tower is incorporated into the southern side of the church building: it is completely plastered with angular pilasters. The belfry extends the angular pilasters of the shaft, has round-arched biforas and supports an entablature with a decorated frieze. The spire is conical and surrounded by small pillars.

=== Interior ===
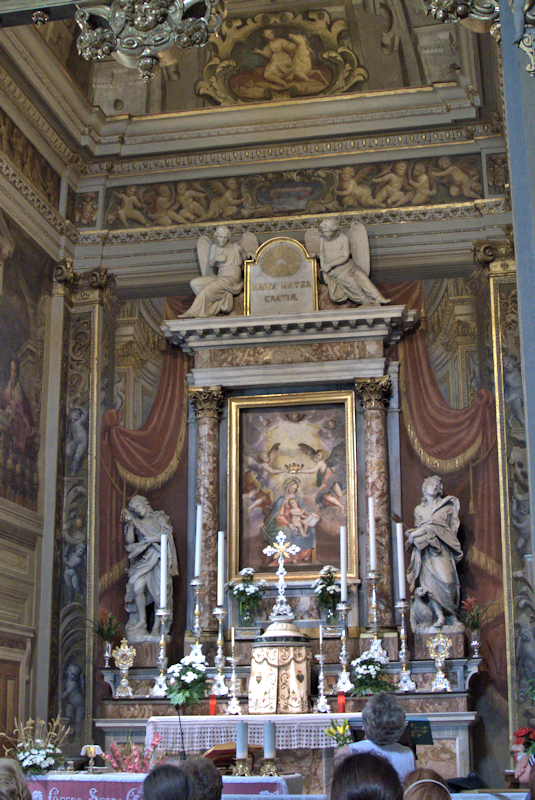
The altar with the venerated image in the center.

The interior is a single rectangular hall divided into three bays with a barrel vault. A triumphal arch leads to the square presbytery, which also has a barrel vault; at the base of the arch a beam supports a 17th-century crucifix; on the front of the beam is an inscription:

JESUM CRUCIFIXUM VENITE ADOREMUS
Come, let us worship the crucified Christ

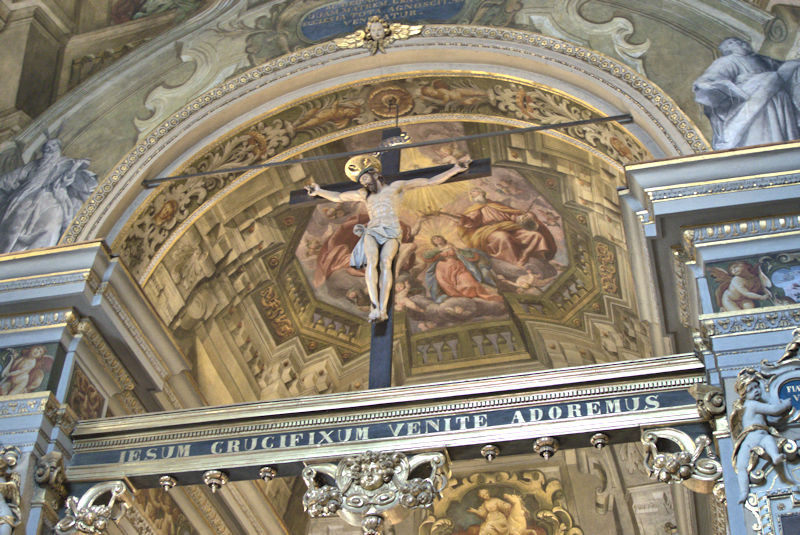
The crucified Christ inside the triumphal arch.

The church is entirely frescoed: the walls of the hall are marked by false pilasters with monochrome cherubs alternating with golden capitals. The pilasters are also repeated at the corners of the presbytery and in both cases they support an entablature and a decoration that repeats the same motif.

On the lower side of the northern wall is the secondary entrance above which is a fresco of the Flight into Egypt. On the southern wall is another door (the entrance to the sacristy) above which is the Serassi mechanical organ built in 1835. On the side walls there are false arches that extend the space of the church and where there are false matronea with balustrades from which the apostles look out.

The walls of the presbytery, although they do not have false arches, have openings with the apostles on either side. Of the two doors in the lower part, one is real.

On the sides of the main entrance, on the counter-façade, there are false niches with St. Sebastian and St. Roch. Painted corbels support the large fresco of the Adoration of the Magi that covers the entire wall.

==== The Adoration of the Magi ====
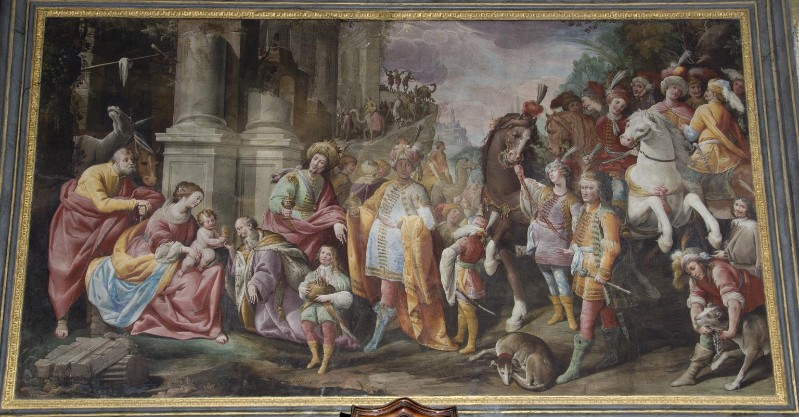
Gian Giacomo Barbelli, Adoration of the Magi, fresco, 1643.

On the left, in a classical setting of ruins, is the Nativity with the Madonna holding the Child and, behind her, Joseph, the ox and the donkey. In the center of the fresco are the Three Kings in oriental dress in various poses. Surrounding the Magi is a group of people: behind them is a kind of procession that seems to continue along a mountain path. On the right are people on horses and grooms. According to tradition, one of these figures, the man with a moustache and goatee who looks directly at the viewer, is a self-portrait of Gian Giacomo Barbelli. The painting is signed.

==== The Flight into Egypt ====
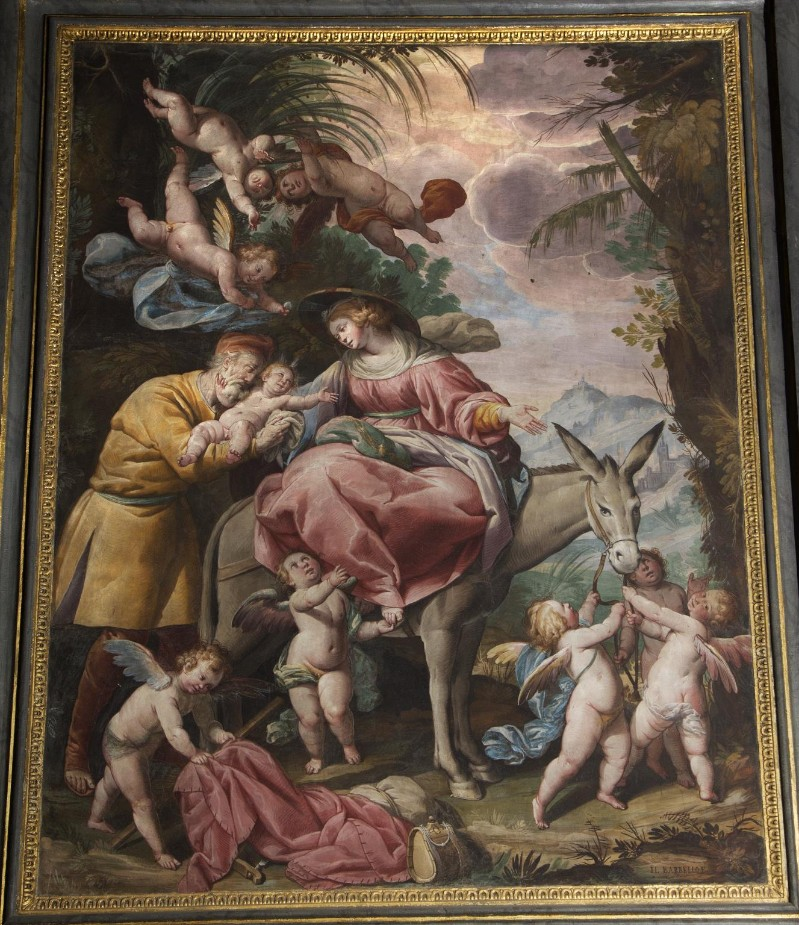
Gian Giacomo Barbelli, The Flight into Egypt, oil on canvas, ca. 1625-1649.

The scene of the Flight into Egypt is on the right wall: it shows a pause in the journey of the Holy Family, with the Madonna in traveling clothes riding a donkey and in the act of handing the Child to Joseph. The family is surrounded by a group of eight little angels: three are holding the reins, one is spreading a cloak on the ground, one is reaching out to help the Virgin descend from the donkey, and three are flying in the air. The whole scene is set in an idyllic landscape. This painting is also signed by Barbelli.

Some art historians consider the “Flight” to be one of the painter's masterpieces.

==== The Assumption of Mary ====
This is located on the barrel vault and is a highly illusionistic scene: above the real entablature, Barbelli painted a balcony in perfect perspective with angels and cherubs sitting on the balustrade. On the corner pedestals, Barbelli painted the four Evangelists.

Pillars and columns, twelve in all, extend the fake scene up to a second rectangular balustrade open to the sky which, however, incorporates a second octagonal one. Inside is the solemn Assumption with the Madonna surrounded by angels fluttering in a very bright sky full of clouds.

The prevailing light comes from the counter-façade, so it has been hypothesized that it was the painter himself who wanted the large window enlarged precisely for this painting.

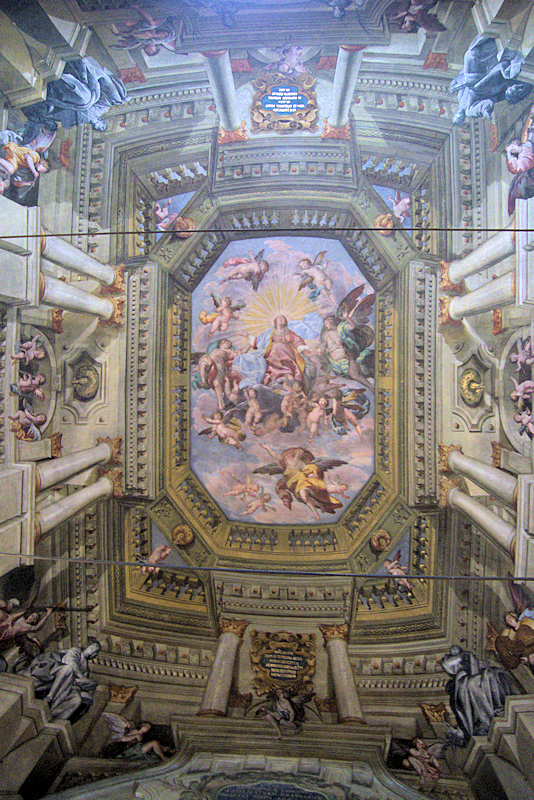
Gian Giacomo Barbelli, Assumption of Mary, fresco, 1643, general view of the vault.

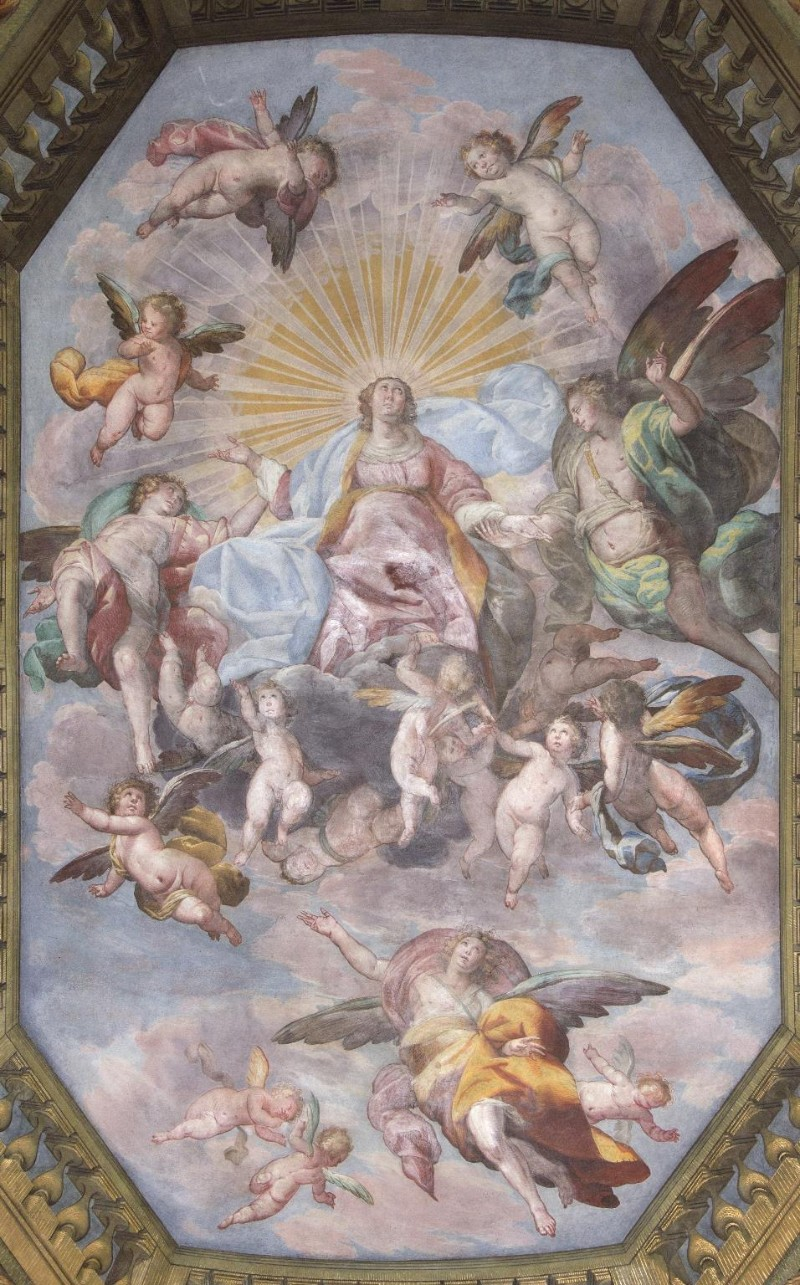
Gian Giacomo Barbelli, Assumption of Mary, fresco, 1643, detail of the scene.

==== The Coronation of Mary ====
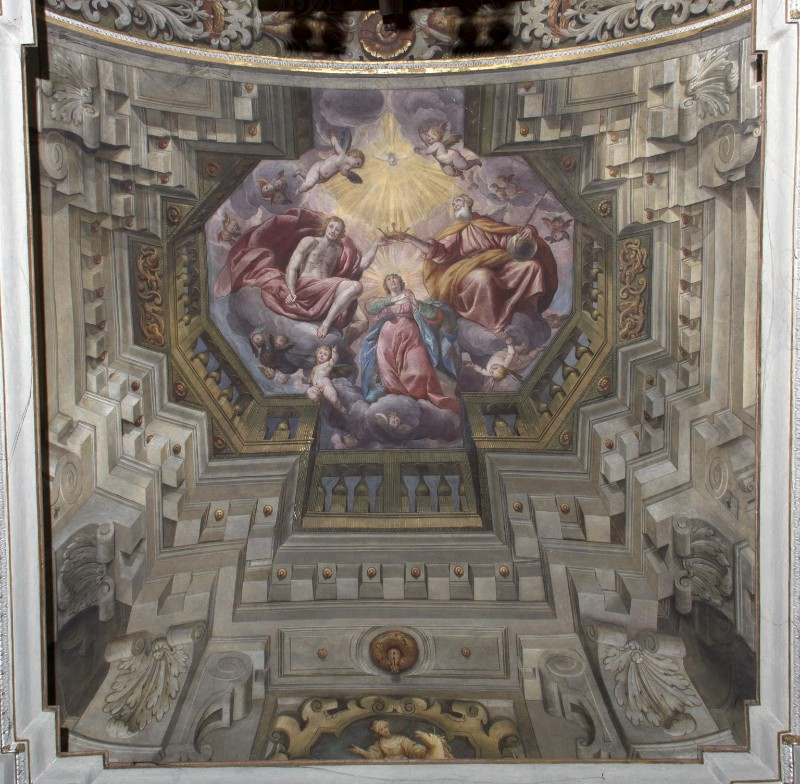
Gian Giacomo Barbelli, The Coronation of the Virgin, fresco, 1643.

This is the scene on the vault of the presbytery, where false corbels resting on an indented frame support an octagonal balcony open to the sky, with the Coronation scene in the center.

The Virgin is crowned by the Holy Trinity, surrounded by the Father and the Son, illuminated by the Holy Spirit and surrounded by a large group of little angels.

==== The altar, the Madonna and Child, the statues by Fantoni ====
The altar and the balustrade surrounding the presbytery are in neoclassical style and were installed in 1824; the materials used are white granite and red Verona marble.

In the altarpiece, between two columns, is placed the venerated image, transferred from the tower of the Venetian walls; the painting is of uncertain attribution, according to tradition, it was made by a certain Giovanni da Caravaggio, but it was also retouched by Tomaso Pombioli (who revitalized the color and worked on the angels holding the crown) and perhaps by Barbelli himself, who could have added the three winged cherubs on the top of the painting.

The two columns support an entablature on which two angels are seated, holding an epigraph with the inscription:

MARIA MATER GRATIAE
Mary, Mother of Grace

The altarpiece is flanked by two statues in Carrara marble, representing Mary Magdalene and St. John the Apostle, signed by Andrea Fantoni in 1716 and coming from the suppressed church of Santa Caterina.

== See also ==
- Roman Catholic Diocese of Crema

== Bibliography ==
- Gussalli, Emilio (1918). Gian Giacomo Barbelli. Contributo alla storia della pittura nel Seicento [Gian Giacomo Barbelli. Contribution to the history of 17th century painting] (in Italian). Emporium.
- Perolini, Mario (1976). Origine dei nomi delle strade di Crema [Origin of the street names in Crema] (in Italian). Cremona: Tip. Padana.
- Alpini, Cesare (1987). Le chiese di S. Giovanni Battista e di S. Maria della Grazie in Crema [The churches of S. Giovanni Battista and S. Maria della Grazie in Crema] (in Italian). Crema: Arti grafiche cremaschie.
- Zucchelli, Giorgio (2004). Architetture dello Spirito: san Giovanni e le Grazie [Architectures of the Spirit: San Giovanni and Le Grazie] (in Italian). Il Nuovo Torrazzo.
- Lasagni, Ilaria (2008). Chiese, conventi e monasteri in Crema e nel suo territorio dall'inizio del dominio veneto alla fondazione della diocesi [Churches, convents and monasteries in Crema and the surrounding area from the beginning of Venetian rule to the foundation of the diocese] (in Italian). Unicopli.
- Gruppo antropologico cremasco (2009). I campanili della diocesi di Crema [The bell towers of the diocese of Crema] (in Italian). Crema: Leva Artigrafiche.
- Dossena, Alberto (2011). Regesto degli organi della diocesi di Crema, in Insula Fulcheria XLI, Volume A [Register of the organs of the diocese of Crema, in Insula Fulcheria XLI, Volume A] (in Italian).
