= Giovanni Battista Lucini =

Italian painter (1639-1686)

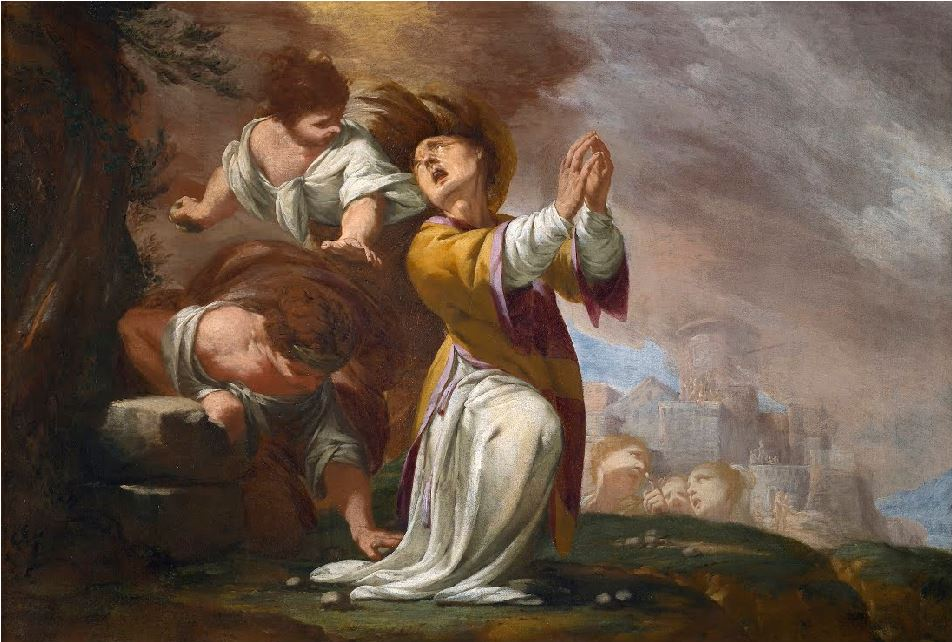
Martyrdom of St. Stephen

Giovanni Battista Lucini or Giovan Battista Lucini (9 July 1639 – 14 or 15 September 1686) was an Italian painter who produced many religious compositions for the religious institutions in Crema. He was active in the region in and around Crema throughout his short career. His innovative works anticipate artistic trends in Lombardy and Venice in the 18th century.

== Life ==
Giovanni Battista Lucini was born in Vaiano Cremasco as the son of Girolamo Lucini and Laura Fogarola. His father was of noble descent and had been elected in 1626 as a member of the council of nobles of the city of Crema, Lombardy where the family resided. His father died when Giovanni Battista Lucini was only six years old, presumably leaving the family in a precarious financial condition. There are no firm records on Lucini from this time until 1663, when he joined the city council and was living in his brother Carlo's house.

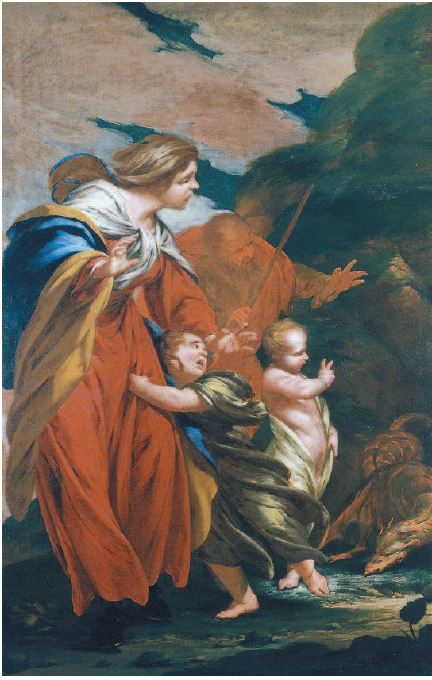
Christ calms the dragons

Giovanni Battista Lucini is believed to have been a pupil of Giovanni Battista Botticchio. Botticchio worked in Crema and was one of the leading 17th century painters in Lombardy. There are no records, which support this apprenticeship but elements of Lucini's style in his early works show Botticchio's influence and make such relationship likely. Small-format works by artists then in vogue which were likely present in the collections of noble families in Crema are believed to have played a role in the formation of Lucini. After Botticchio's death in 1666, Lucini travelled and spent time in Genoa, Milan and Veneto.

Lucini never married and had no children. He made a will on 18 February 1684. He died in Crema on the night between 14 and 15 September 1686. He was buried in the church of Saint Catherine of the Carmelites in Crema, a church that no longer exists.

Lucini's pupils included his nephew who was also called Giovan Battista Lucini, Giambattista Marmoro and Giambattista Carello.

== Work ==
Giovanni Battista Lucini was a canvas painter who created religious paintings for the religious institutions in the Crema region. In his early years the Genoese and Venetian influences which he had received during his travels are apparent. His first known dated work is the St Francis de Sales (likely 1665, Chiesa di San Giacomo Maggiore, Crema), which shows 'tenebrist' features as well as a great attention to perspective, in which he was reportedly particularly skilled. Evident in his early works are also the influence of his presumed master Botticchio, particularly in the use of chiaroscuro, which gives the figures in his compositions an almost sculptural aspect.

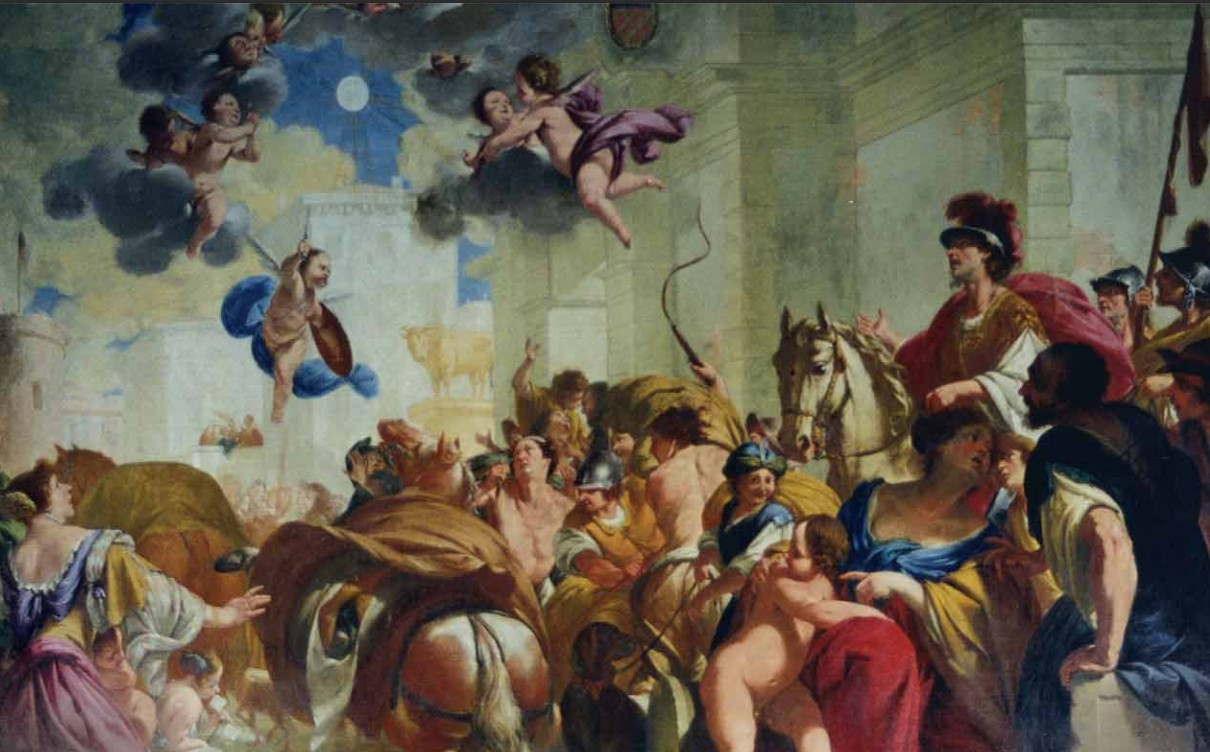
The miracle of Torino

His early masterpiece is the Liberation of Saint Peter painted in 1675 for the church of San Bernardino degli Osservanti in Crema. This work shows his adherence to the dark tonality of this tenebrist period together with a development towards a more realist approach in the intense expressions of the figures. This work established the artist's reputation and earned him many commissions from the churches in Crema.

Over the years Lucini's work gained in liveliness and playfulness and became less dark. This evolution towards more colour is represented in two works depicting the biblical story of the Flight into Egypt, the Christ calms the dragons and Mary fed by the palm (both in the Parish Church of Ombriano). The works are characterised by their full-bodied and bright color and the solidity of the figures. In two works, one representing the Saints Pietro d'Alcántara and Bernardino da Feltre (San Bernardino Church, Crema) and the other the Miracle of San Pietro d'Alcantara (Museo civico di Crema e del Cremasco) Lucini abandoned all tenebrist tendencies in favor of the use of a homogeneous nucleus of light, which binds the whole picture together and defines the psychology of the figures. The calm and sober esthetic of the pictures has been linked to the spirituality and vows of poverty proper to the Dominican Order.

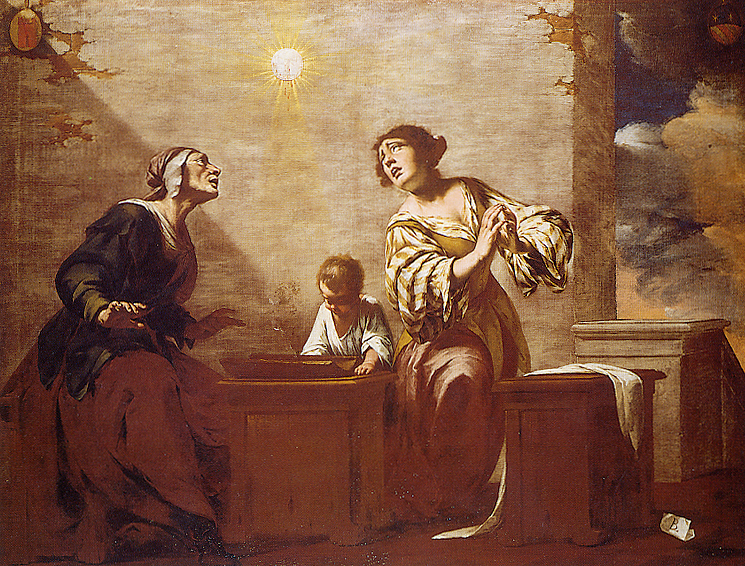
The miracle of the stolen Host

Between 1681 and 1684 Lucini painted some large paintings for the presbytery of the Cathedral of Crema on the subject of the Miracles of the Eucharist. These works anticipated the cycle of the Blessed Sacrament made in 1700 for the Cathedral of Milan by Filippo Abbiati. These works display an increased theatricality in the figures, which are rendered in nervous poses.
