= Antonio Cifrondi =

Italian painter (1656–1730)

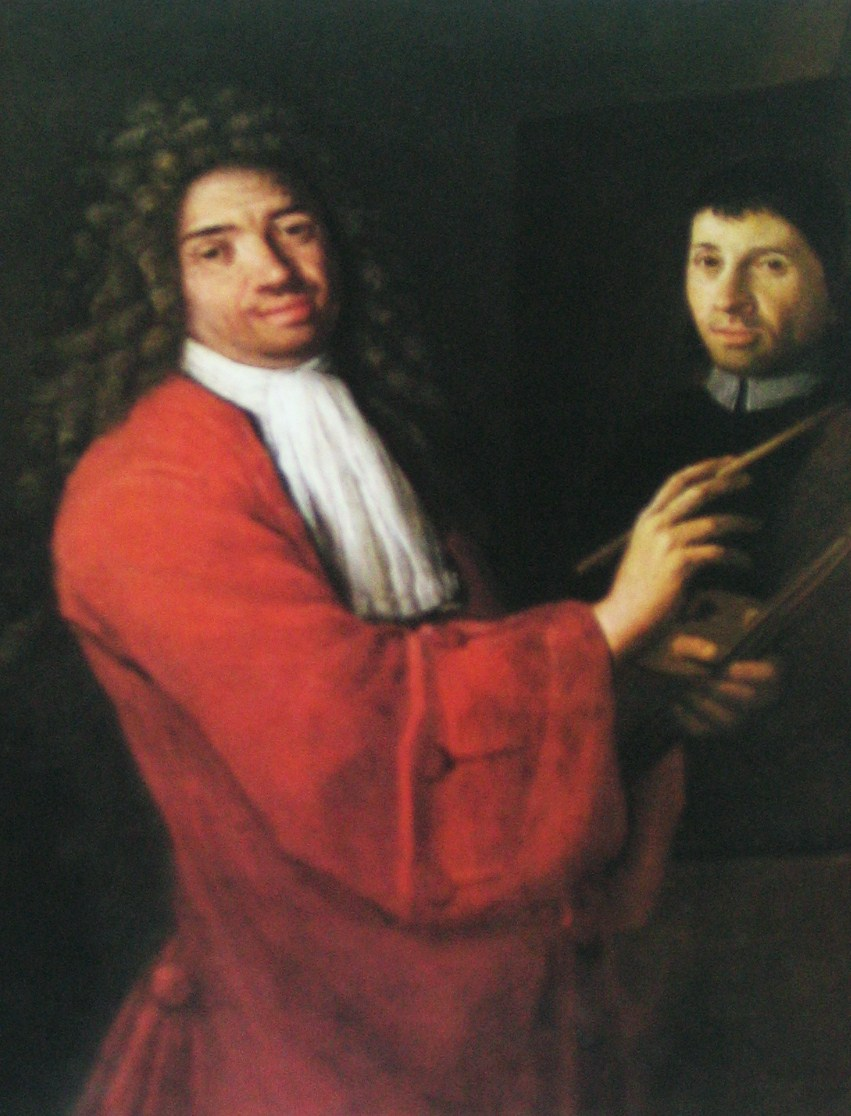
Self-portrait

Antonio Cifrondi (June 11, 1655 – October 30, 1730) was an Italian painter of the late Baroque, mainly of genre themes. He was active in Brescia and near Bergamo.

He was born to a poor mason in Clusone. After some local training. Cifrondi moved to Bologna with Marcantonio Franceschini, a member of the Cignani circle. He traveled to Turin with his younger brother Ventura, but was not successful in finding work. He stayed in Rome during 1675–1680. He briefly worked in the Palace of Versailles under Le Brun, but was dismissed before the age of 30. He lived in the Benedictine convent of San Faustino in the last decade of his life. He may have met the fellow northern Italian genre painter Giuseppe Maria Crespi. He influenced Giuseppe Roncelli.

He is known by canvases mainly during 1722–1730. He often painted aged men or people at work.

In 1897, a historian of Bergamo described him as one of the adventurers who '"vaguely foreseeing the advent of a new era ... gave a sign of a nervous agitation and a restlessness, and felt need to get out of the narrow circle of village life, traveling and observing a little of everything, somewhat eager for fresh air and brighter light". He describes him as always poor but full of cheer.

== Gallery ==
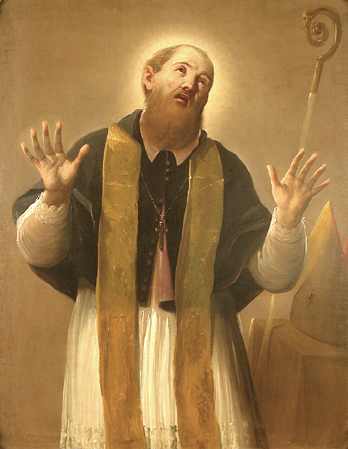
Saint and Bishop

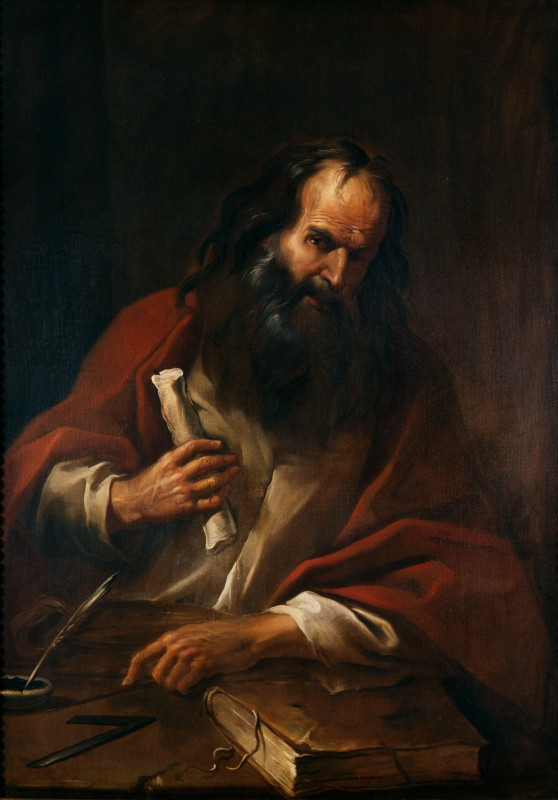
Euclid

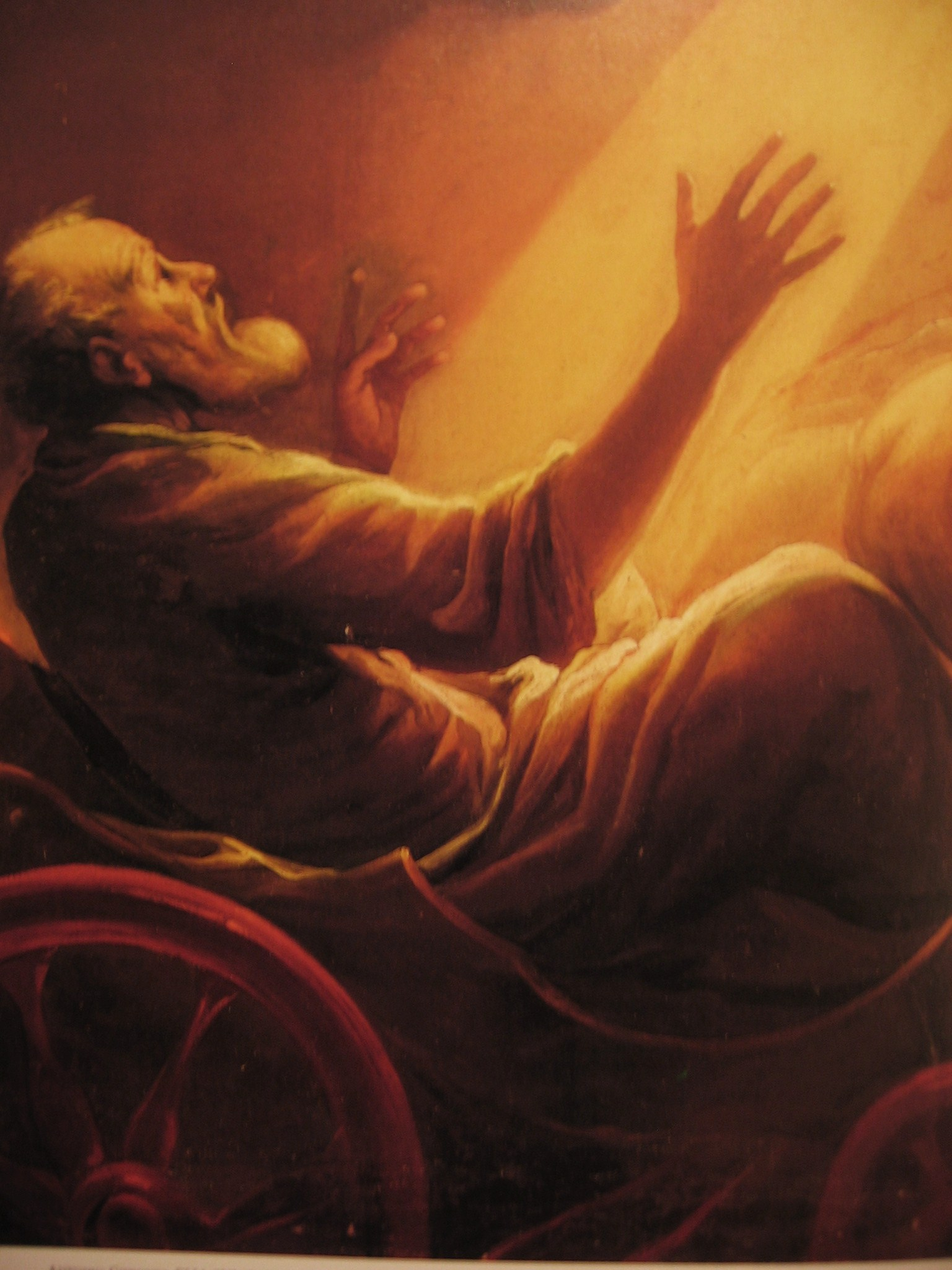
Elijah and chariot of fire

== Sources ==
- Scotti, Giulio (1897). Bergamo nel Seiciento, Saggi Illustrativi. Bergamo: Stab. Tipo-Litografico Frat. Bolis.
- Spike, John T. (1986). Giuseppe Maria Crespi and the Emergence of Genre Painting in Italy. Fort Worth: Kimball Museum of Art. pp. 68–69.

== Other projects ==
Media related to Antonio Cifrondi at Wikimedia Commons
