= Palazzo Moroni =

Palace in Bergamo, Italy

Coordinates: 45°42′12″N 9°40′05″E

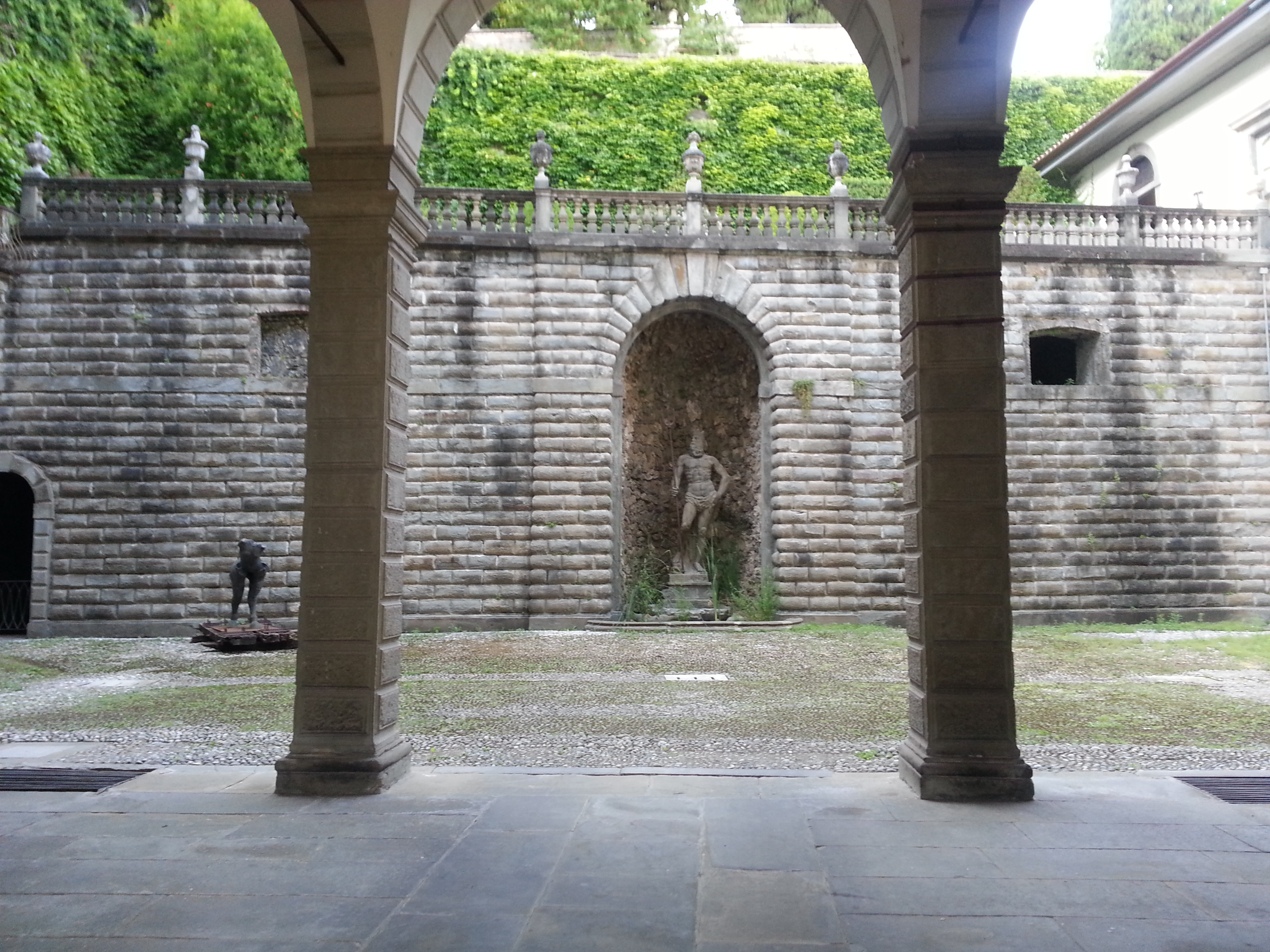
Interior courtyard of Palazzo Moroni with statue of Neptune by Lorenzo Redi

The Palazzo Moroni is a palace located on Via Porta #12 in the historic center of the upper town of Bergamo, Italy. The palace is a civic art museum, as well as used for cultural functions. The building, noted for its Baroque interior decorations, is presently managed by the Fondazione di Palazzo Moroni in conjunction with the city after a donation by Count Antonio Moroni.

The exterior is plain and faces a narrow steep street. Construction of the palace was commissioned by Francesco Moroni. The Moroni family had bought a homes at this site in the second half of the 16th century. After his marriage to Lucrezia Roncalli in 1631, he began construction of the Palace on the ground of Porta Penta. Construction went on until 1666.

In 1649 Francesco contracted Giovanni Giacomo Barbelli to fresco the rooms of the interiors. Over the next century, further decorations were added including ceilings depicting The Age of Gold, The Fall of the Giants, and Hercules on a Chariot. The main ball room depicts stories from Torquato Tasso’s Gerusalemme Liberata. The entrance stairway was frescoed by Paolo Vincenzo Bonomini. Among the works displayed in the palace are works by Giovanni Battista Moroni, Bernardino Luini, Giovanni Giacomo Barbelli, Giuseppe Roncelli, and Cesare Tallone.

The interior opens up to an inner garden with terraces.

The renovation carried out in the mid-19th century gave the building the appearance it retains today. It was precisely as part of this major renovation that the Palazzo Marenzi, located on the opposite side of the street, was purchased in 1878 and subsequently completely demolished, in order to provide the first-floor openings with more light and a panoramic view.

== Description ==
=== Entrance ===
The palazzo was not built with its main façade facing Via Porta Dipinta. Consequently, the façade is quite understated and features an asymmetrical portal—a design choice necessitated by the presence of Palazzo Marenzi, which obstructed a clear view. The large entrance gateway leads into an inner courtyard, laid out with a precise sense of perspective; at the center of a grand rusticated wall, set within a niche, stands a statue of Neptune—all of which are 17th-century works by Lorenzo Redi. The wall terminates in a stone balustrade, adorned with urns, which marks the boundary of the palace’s extensive parkland, stretching as far as the hill of Sant'Eufemia. The entrance hall, which looks out onto the inner courtyard, once featured a fresco depicting a *putto* holding a pair of scales, accompanied by the inscription Aequa lance librandum.
