= Giovanni Battista Botticchio =

Italian painter (1619–1666)

Giovanni Battista Bottichio or Bottecchi (1619 – 1666) was an Italian painter of the Baroque period, active in Crema, Lombardy.

He was born in Crema, and was a pupil of Giovanni Giacomo Barbelli. He painted a Coronation of the Virgin with Saints Andrew and Zeno (1647) for the parish church of Capralba, He painted a Crucifixion and Saints (1648) for the apse of San Benedetto, Crema. He also frescoed the Chapel of San Giuseppe in this church. He also painted a Saints Dominic and Peter Martyr found in the Curia Vescovile of Crema, a Pietà now in the Accademia Tadini of Lovere. He also frescoed the Chapel of the Blessed Virgin in the parish church of Corte Madama, considered his masterworks. He has an Assumption found in the Pinacoteca of Orzi Nuovi.
