= Giovanni Giacomo Barbelli =

Italian painter

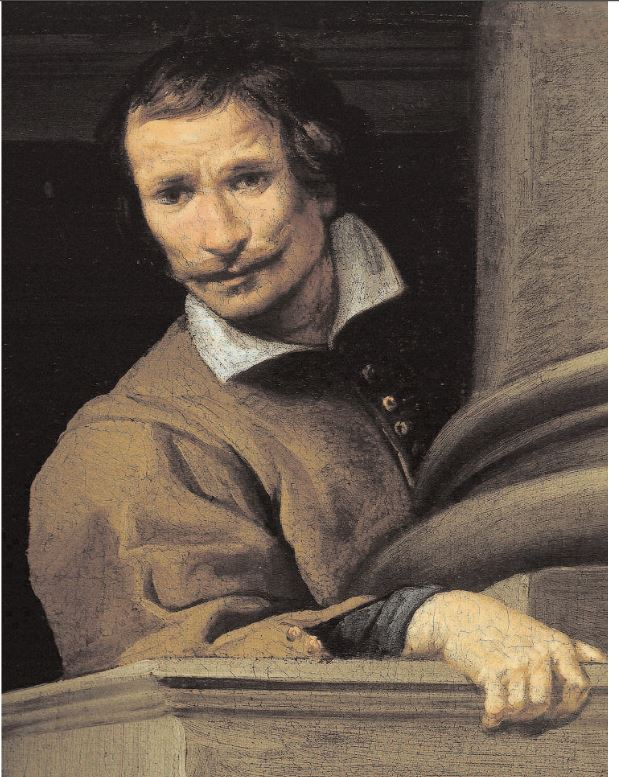
Self-portrait

Giovanni Giacomo Barbelli (17 April 1604 – 12 July 1656) was an Italian painter of the Baroque period, active in Lombardy. He was a canvas and fresco painter known for his religious and mythological scenes that decorated many churches and residences in Lombardy. He was a highly skilled draughtsman and a brilliant colorist. His work shows an inventive imagination and a thorough knowledge of perspective.

== Life ==
He was born in Offanengo, near Crema. At a young age, he learned the art of drawing and painting in Naples. After returning to his homeland, he began to work in his city. There, he passed his craft to other Lombard centers, where, by alternately treating the technique of oil painting and fresco, he demonstrated skill in drawing and often brilliant color. He painted vaults and walls of stately rooms with a high spirit of inventive imagination and perspective knowledge.

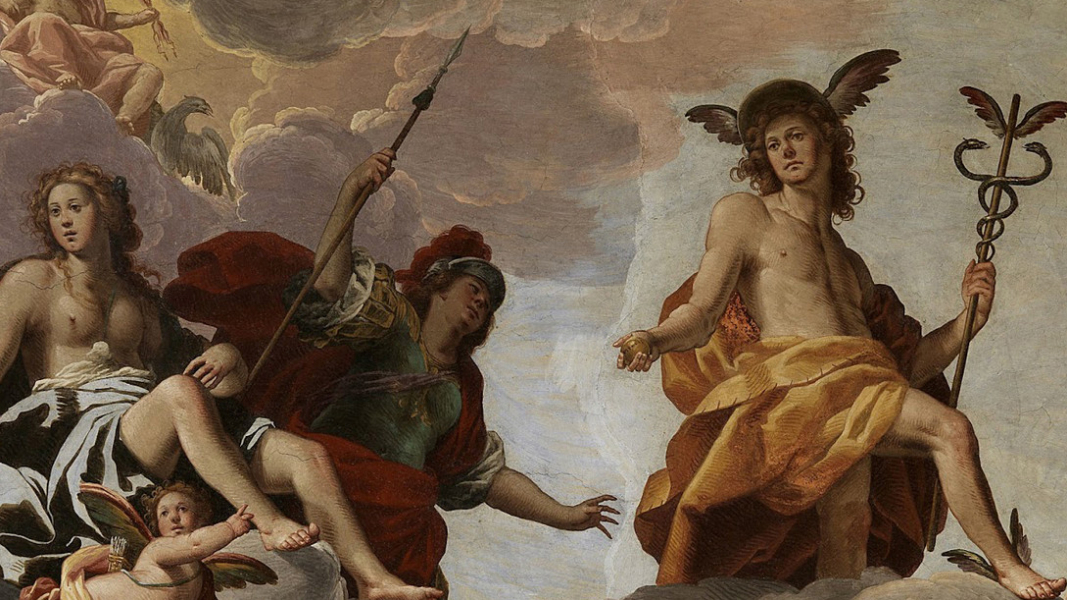
Olympus

He is mentioned as a mentor of Evaristo Baschenis. Among his works is a Nativity altarpiece for the sanctuary of Nostra Signora della Brughiera in Bulliana in the province of Biella. He also painted two altarpieces, a Crucifixion and a Circumcision (attributed) for the Sanctuary della Madonna del Pianto in Ono Degno, near Pertica Bassa. He painted history scenes into quadratura by Domenico Ghislandi for the Palazzo Terzi as well as for the Palazzo Moroni (1649–1654) in Bergamo. Barbello frescoed Glory of the Magdalen and scenes from her life in the presbytery and apse for the church of Santa Maria Maddalena, Cremona.

He died on 2 July 1656 in Calcinato (Brescia) when he was accidentally hit by an arquebus shot during a festival.

One of his pupils was Giovanni Battista Botticchio.

== Artistic Activity ==
Among his early works are frescoes depicting Episodes of life of St George (1611), in the church of Casaletto Vaprio, and frescoes depicting Fifteen Mysteries of the Rosary, (1611–1618) in the oratory of San Rocco in Montodine.

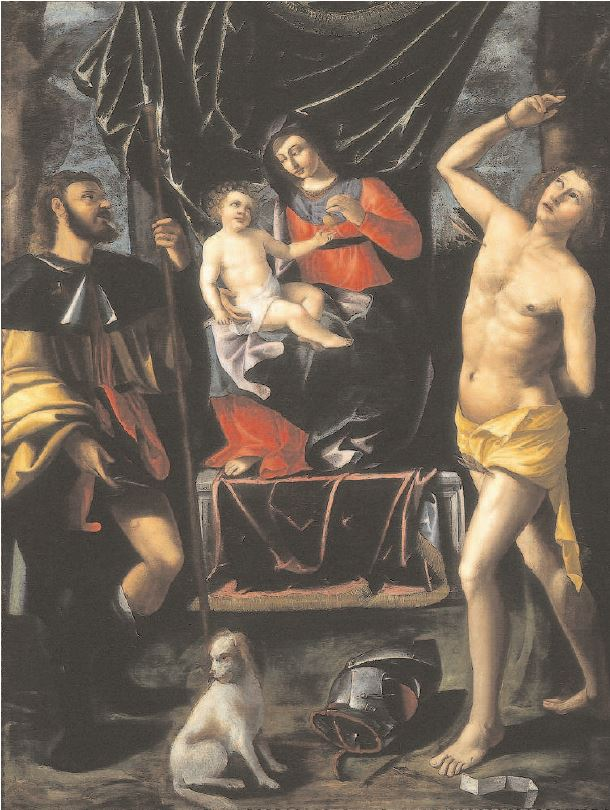
Virgin and child between Saint Roch and Saint Sebastian

Barbelli painted an altarpiece depicting Saints Roch and Sebastian (1631) for the parish church of Madignano, near Crema. Around 1635–1638, he painted two important fresco cycles in the churches of Santa Maria delle Grazie and San Giovanni Decollato of Crema.

In 1636 he executed a lively self-portrait in the act of playing the guitar with an elegant gentleman's dress. A decade later he painted the altarpiece with Virgin in Glory and Saints (1646) for the church of San Lazzaro in Bergamo. He painted in 1646 an altarpiece of the Virgin in Glory with the Saints Joseph and Lazarus for the Church of Saint Lazarus in Bergamo.

During 1647–1649, Barbelli made the vast fresco decorations in the vaults of the staircase and some rooms in the palace of the Counts Moroni in Bergamo, together with Giovanni Battista Azzola, his first student. In Bergamo and in the Bergamasco he carried out his major activity, painting figures for churches, generally of considerable size. For San Rocco, he executed an altarpiece depicting Saints Fermo and Antony for the Angelini chapel in Sant'Agostino, and Two Stories of Miracles of San Nicola, now displayed to the parish church of Sant'Andrea after the suppression of the Augustinian church.

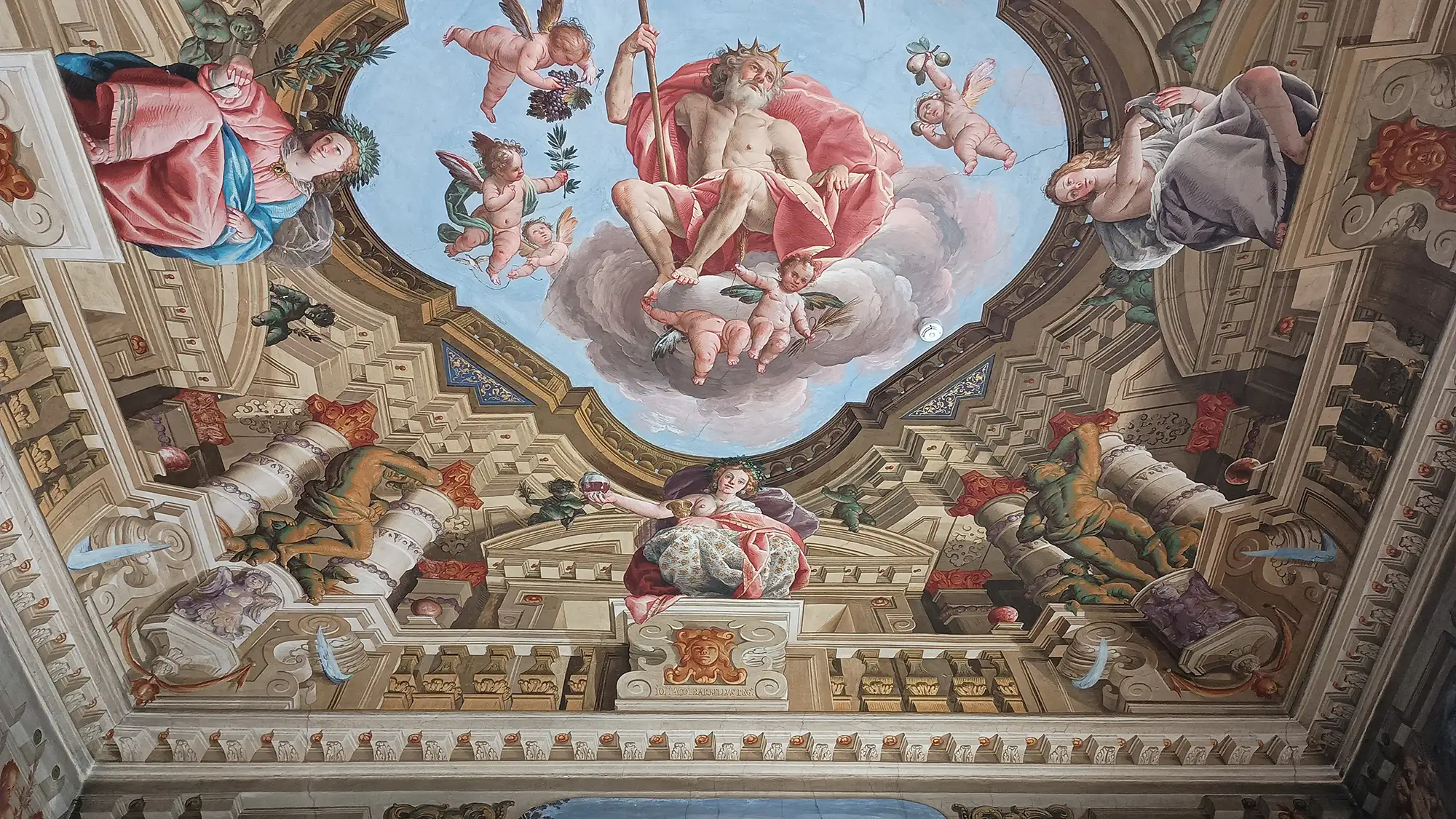
Abundance, 1649-1650, Palazzo Moroni, Bergamo, Italy (view 1)

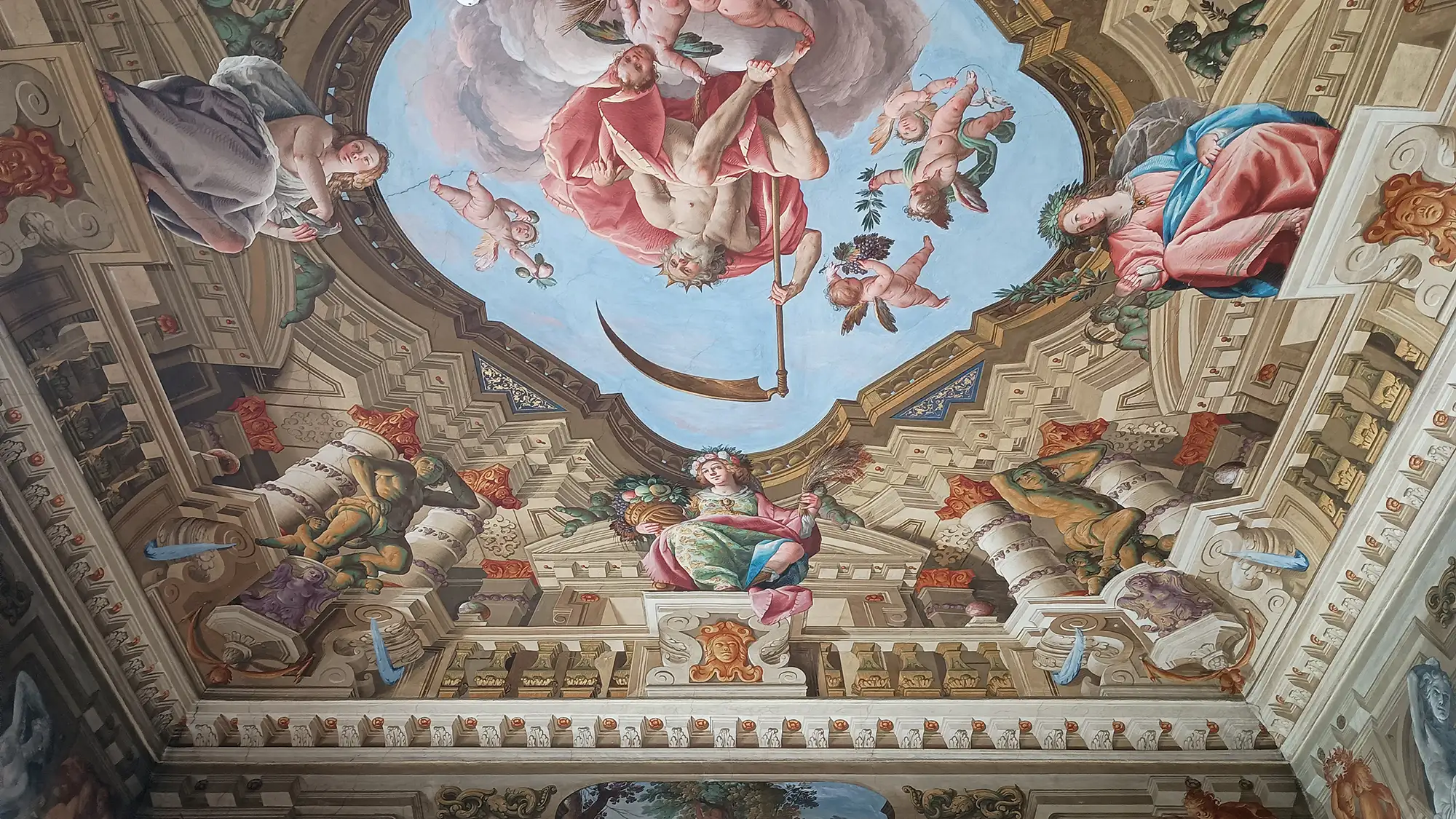
Abundance, 1649-1650, Palazzo Moroni, Bergamo, Italy (view 2)

He painted an altarpiece depicting the Holy Trinity for the church of Gandino; in Lovere, in the ancient church of Santa Maria di Valvendra, aSt Francis of Assisi, and a large painting depicting Presentation of Jesus at the Temple. The Pinacoteca Tadini in Lovere displays two of his works: a Dead Christ between the Madonna and Mary Magdalene and a St Michael.

Altarpieces are found in Santi Faustino e Giovita, Brescia and in the parishes of Quintano (Cremona) and Santa Maria Assunta, Ombriano.

Before he completed the large decorative works of the Palazzo Terzi and Palazzo Moroni in Bergamo and the rooms of the castle of Cavemago, Barbelli had already demonstrated excellent knowledge of perspective in painting rooms of Crema and Cremasco buildings, such as in: villa Tensini (now Sabadini), Santa Maria della Croce, Premoli palace in Crema, and villa Vimercati Sanseverino (formerly Benzoni) in Vaiano Cremasco.
