= Giuseppe Roncelli =

Italian painter

Giuseppe Roncelli (1661–1729) was an Italian painter and priest of the late Baroque. He was active in Bergamo and Crema.

== Biography ==
He was born to an Italian family in Candia (Crete), which fled when the Ottomans displaced the Venetians as rulers. He was sent to seminary in Bergamo. His artistic education is poorly documented and is said to have studied or been influenced by Antonio Cifrondi and in Brescia under Antonio Tempesta. He painted for the church of the Madonna di Stezzano.
