= House with the Grand Peristyle in Vieux-la-Romaine =

Gallo-Roman domus

- Maison au grand péristyle de Vieux
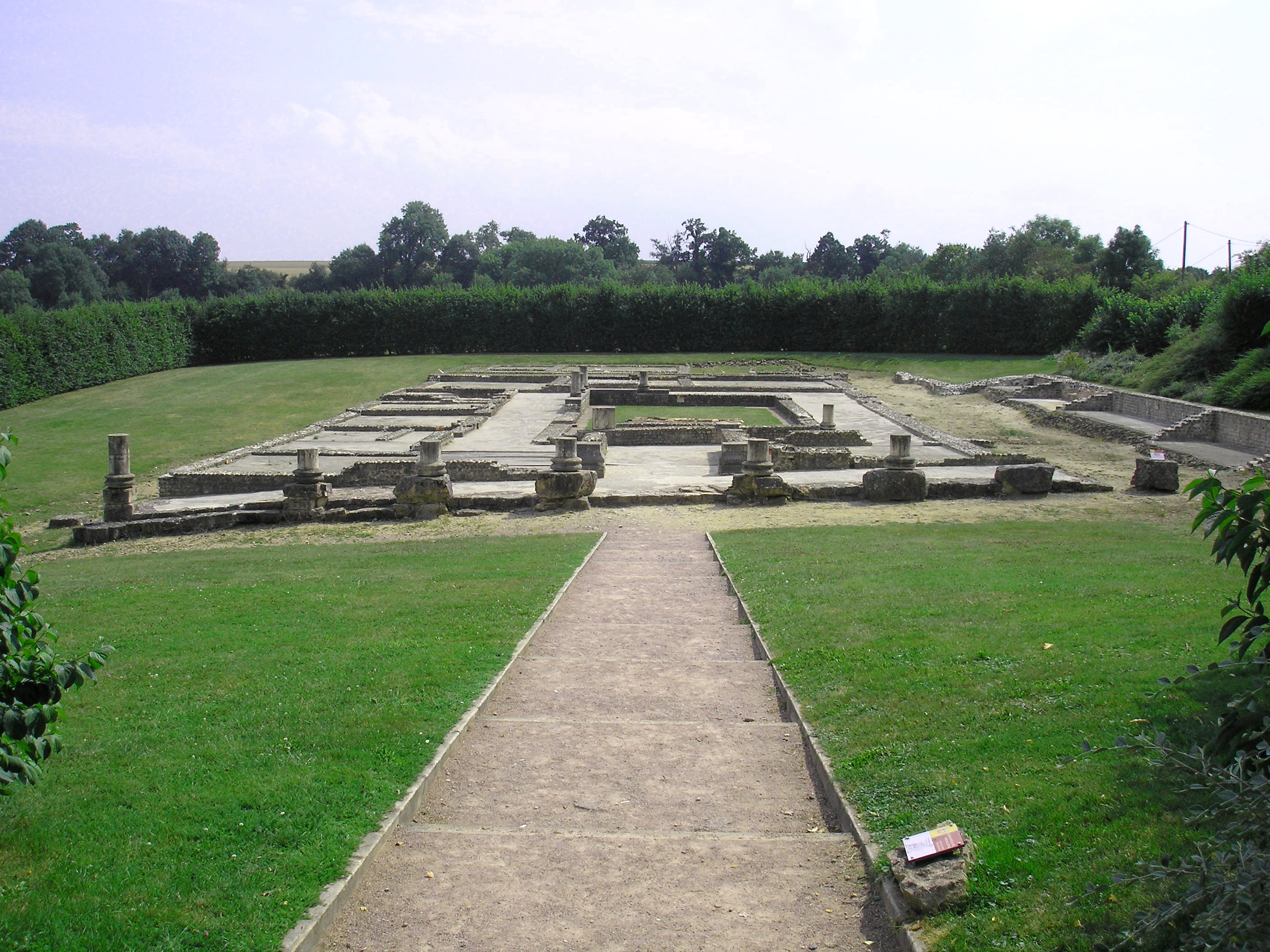
- Overview of the domus
- Interactive map of House with the Grand Peristyle in Vieux-la-Romaine
- 49°06′15″N 0°25′53″W
- Type: Domus, archaeological site
- Cultures: Ancient Rome
- Location: Vieux, Calvados, France

Site notes
- Material: Caen stone, brick and travertine
- Width: 1,250 m 2 to 1,500 m 2

The House with the Grand Peristyle, erroneously designated the Villa with the Grand Peristyle, is also known as the domus of Lower Vieux. It is a Gallo-Roman domus located within the archaeological site of Vieux-la-Romaine, the ancient Aregenua, approximately 15 kilometers south of Caen.

The city was established during the 1st century and reached its apogee during the 2nd and 3rd centuries. The city was not fortified and did not become the seat of a bishopric as a result of the invasions that occurred during the 3rd century. The territory of the Viducasses, of which Aregenua was the capital, was absorbed by the city of Bayeux as evidenced by the early 5th century. Consequently, the city ceased to exist as an urban center, even though the site remained continuously occupied. The Lower Vieux house is a distinctive building that reached its apogee in the 2nd and 3rd centuries.

As a consequence of the urbanization of the city from the 5th century onwards, the archaeological remains of the ancient city are accessible for research purposes and were the subject of early excavations, which commenced at the end of the 17th century. The site of the house was subjected to a more systematic excavation in the 19th century, with a particularly comprehensive program undertaken in the late 1980s. The comprehensive excavation also delineated the chronology of the insula on which it is situated, from the 1st to the 5th century AD. The extent of the discoveries prompted the establishment of a site museum, the Vieux-la-Romaine Archaeological Museum, which was inaugurated in 2002. The coatings were re-studied in 2010.

The House with the Grand Peristyle is distinctive within the context of northern French architecture due to its unique proportions and the state of conservation of its decorative elements, including a set of sculpted columns. Although not exceptional in size or decoration, the house nevertheless represents an archetypal example of this type of residence, according to Vipard, which was constructed by elites who sought to play a social and political role, beyond that of individual habitation. The house thus testifies to the diffusion of Mediterranean architectural models among the Gallic elites, the process of Romanization, and the role of these buildings in social life.

== Location ==
Simplified map of Aregenua

Map of cities in the High Roman Empire

The commune of Vieux-la-Romaine is situated approximately 10 kilometers southwest of Caen. It encompasses the site of the ancient city of Aregenua, the urban center of the Gallic people of the Viducasses, which spanned an area of 2,300 km^{2}.

The House with the Grand Peristyle, whose facade is connected to the cardo, is situated on the Guigne hillside in the bath district. This area is characterized by a high density of buildings, a system of galleries along the street frontage, and a network of roads established in the 2nd century.

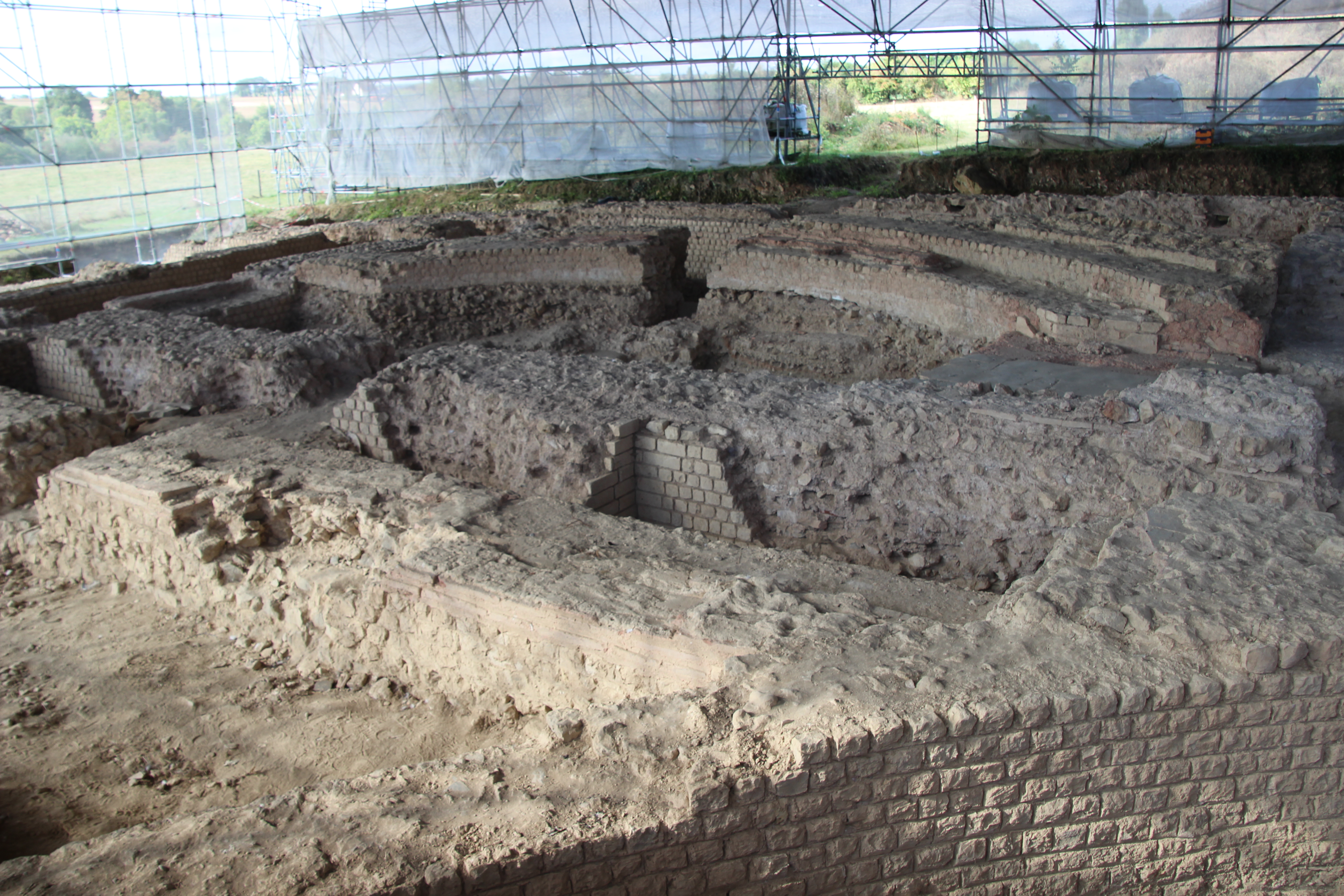
Remains of the Vieux forum presented during the 2016 European Heritage Days

In the immediate vicinity, the discovery of guard stone provides evidence of the existence of a fountain. A second bath building, excavated in the 18th and 19th centuries, is located approximately 40 meters to the southwest. This structure, measuring approximately 90 meters by 50 meters, is believed to have been divided into two sections, one for men and one for women. It was donated to the city by two prominent Gallo-Romans, Sollemninus and Titus Sennius Sollemnis, at the end of the 2nd century or the beginning of the 3rd century. This is indicated by an honorific inscription engraved on a pedestal known as the marble of Thorigny.

Near the house, to the east, are insulae composed of wood and wattle and daub, as well as a modestly sized domus on its north side and a second one near shops. To the north are baths dated to the mid-2nd century and excavated in the 19th century. In addition, the city forum, (Note: Boislève 2011, p. 136) which was excavated in the 19th century and again in the late 20th and early 21st centuries, is located in the vicinity.

The facade of the House with the Grand Peristyle is visible to the northwest of the site. Based on the absence of other remains south of the house, the archaeologists hypothesize that this structure marks the limit of the ancient city.

== History ==
=== History of the city ===
Map of Late-Empire cities

The city of Aregenua, the seat of the Viducasses tribe, was established in the 1st century and reached its apogee in the 2nd and 3rd centuries (Note: Rioult & Vipard 1999, p. 189) under the Severan dynasty. (Note: Delaval 2004, p. 498)

The city was significantly impacted during the period of instability that affected the Roman Empire in the 3rd century. Still, it lacked the fortifications that other neighboring cities, such as Jublains, Lisieux, Bayeux, and Évreux, had in place. Although the site continued to be inhabited, it lost importance to Bayeux, which became the seat of a bishopric. At the end of the 3rd century and the beginning of the 4th century, the decline became even more pronounced, (Note: Rioult & Vipard 1999, p. 189) resulting in the merger of the city with Bayeux in the early 4th century (Note: Delaval 2004, p. 497) and the subsequent disappearance of the city from the administrative records before 400 AD. A significant exodus of the population accompanied this. (Note: Delaval 2004, p. 498)

=== History of the building ===
==== From origins to flourishing ====
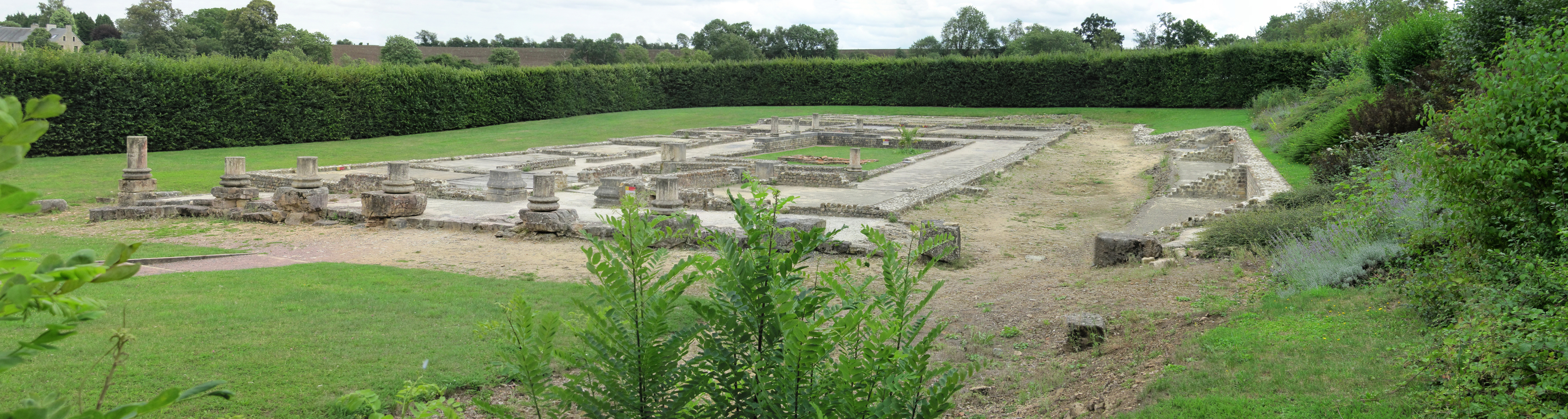
General view of the house

The archaeological excavations have revealed a great deal about the history of the neighborhood. The evidence indicates that the building materials used for the houses in the area improved over time, and that a growing luxury characterizes the evolution of the building.

===== Early occupations in the area =====
A double house that forms the basis of what will become the House with the Grand Peristyle

The initial occupations of the site, dated to the 1st and 2nd centuries AD, involved the construction of modest structures of wood, wattle, and daub, and floors crafted from beaten earth. It seems probable that the area of the domus had an artisanal vocation, including workshops of bronzesmiths or glassmakers. The neighborhood was crisscrossed with roads from 125-150 AD, which marks the period during which the use of stone in construction became widespread in Aregenua. (Note: Rioult & Vipard 1999, p. 190)

In the mid-2nd century, the insula was home to two buildings: the eastern house (751 m^{2}) and the western house. The latter is notable for the reuse of certain elements in subsequent constructions. The western house was partially demolished.

===== House with the small peristyle =====
Plan of the House with the small peristyle

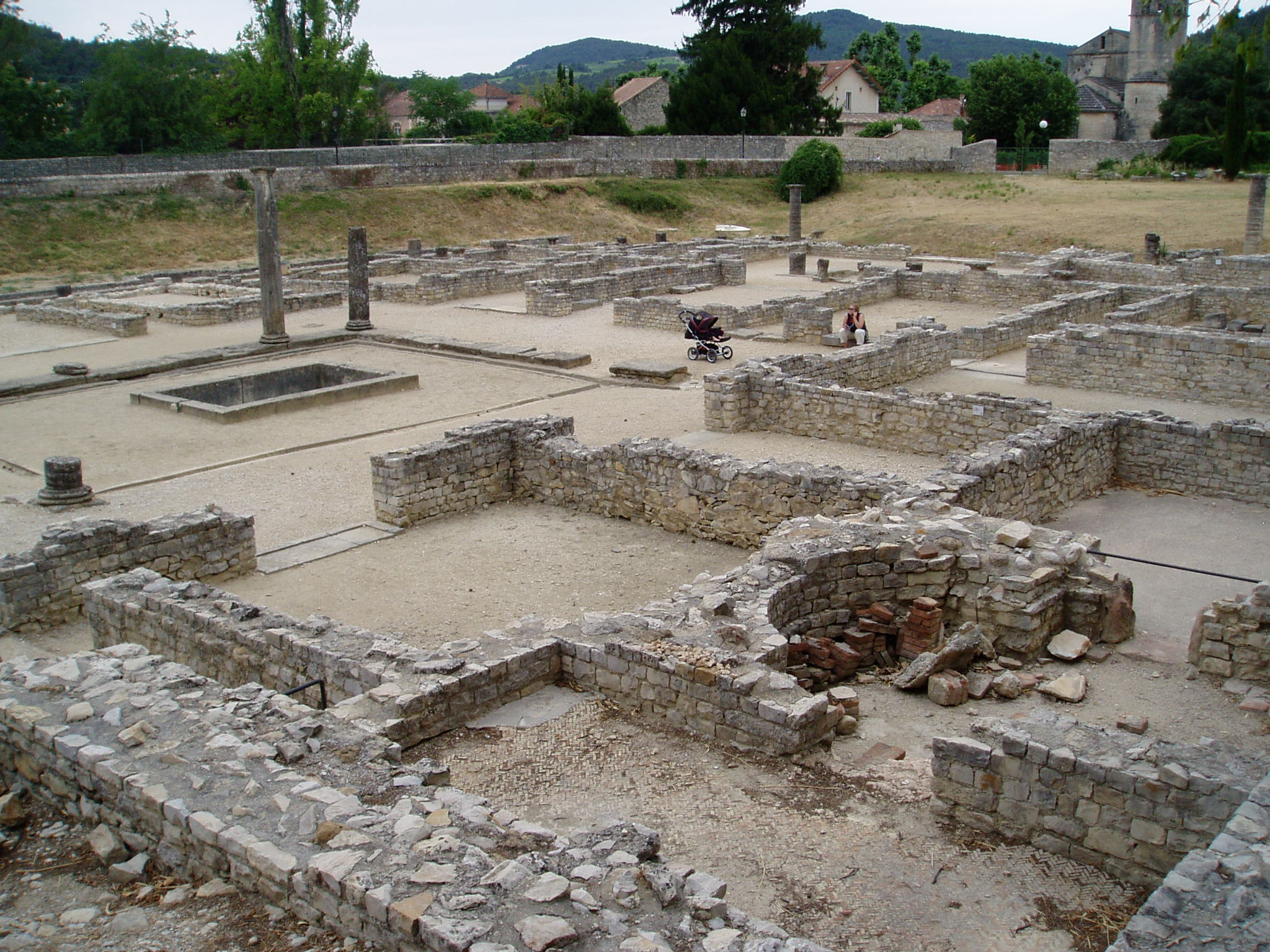
General view of the Maison au Dauphin in Vaison

The houses of the third quarter of the 2nd century were already large buildings. One of them was destroyed around 170–180 AD to allow the expansion of a second building, which archaeologists have named the House with the Small Peristyle due to the presence of a modestly sized peristyle.

In addition to this expansion, alterations were made to the entire building. A new wing was constructed on the south side, rooms were added to the existing structure, and the west wing underwent a significant transformation. The house was constructed according to a classical Greco-Italian rectangular plan, measuring approximately 50 meters by 30 meters. The building's area was expanded through the addition of a garden, and it was simultaneously adorned with luxurious decorative elements. The courtyard measured 5.30 m by 7.90 m and featured a brick basin enclosed by a portico 2.70 m wide, with 10 columns displaying rare decorative elements. The house also included a tablinum, which was an architectural innovation for the period, although a similar arrangement is documented in the House of the Dolphin in Vasio.

===== House with the Grand Peristyle =====
Towards the end of the 2nd or the beginning of the 3rd century, substantial alterations were made to the structure. A viridarium was constructed within the courtyard, and the peristyle underwent a significant expansion, which lends credence to the designation of the house as the House with the Grand Peristyle. The house was continuously occupied until the last quarter of the 3rd century.

==== Decline and destruction ====
===== House with the checkerboard mosaic =====
The building sustained fire damage in the latter half of the third century (Note: Vipard 1998, p. 100) but was subsequently repaired and dubbed the House with the Checkerboard Mosaic, a moniker derived from the advent of this novel decorative element. The quality of life for the inhabitants of the house appears to have declined, with artisans, metallurgists, and butchers taking up residence. (Note: Vipard 1998, p. 102) The architectural plan remained unchanged, and the modifications indicate a continued occupation. The hypocaust system was no longer in use, and a mosaic was restored with tile mortar, suggesting that the occupants lacked the expertise to repair the work with local artisans. The water supply system for the basins was no longer operational, and a water evacuation system was constructed to compensate for a failing pipe. (Note: Vipard 1998, pp. 100–101)

===== Progressive destruction =====
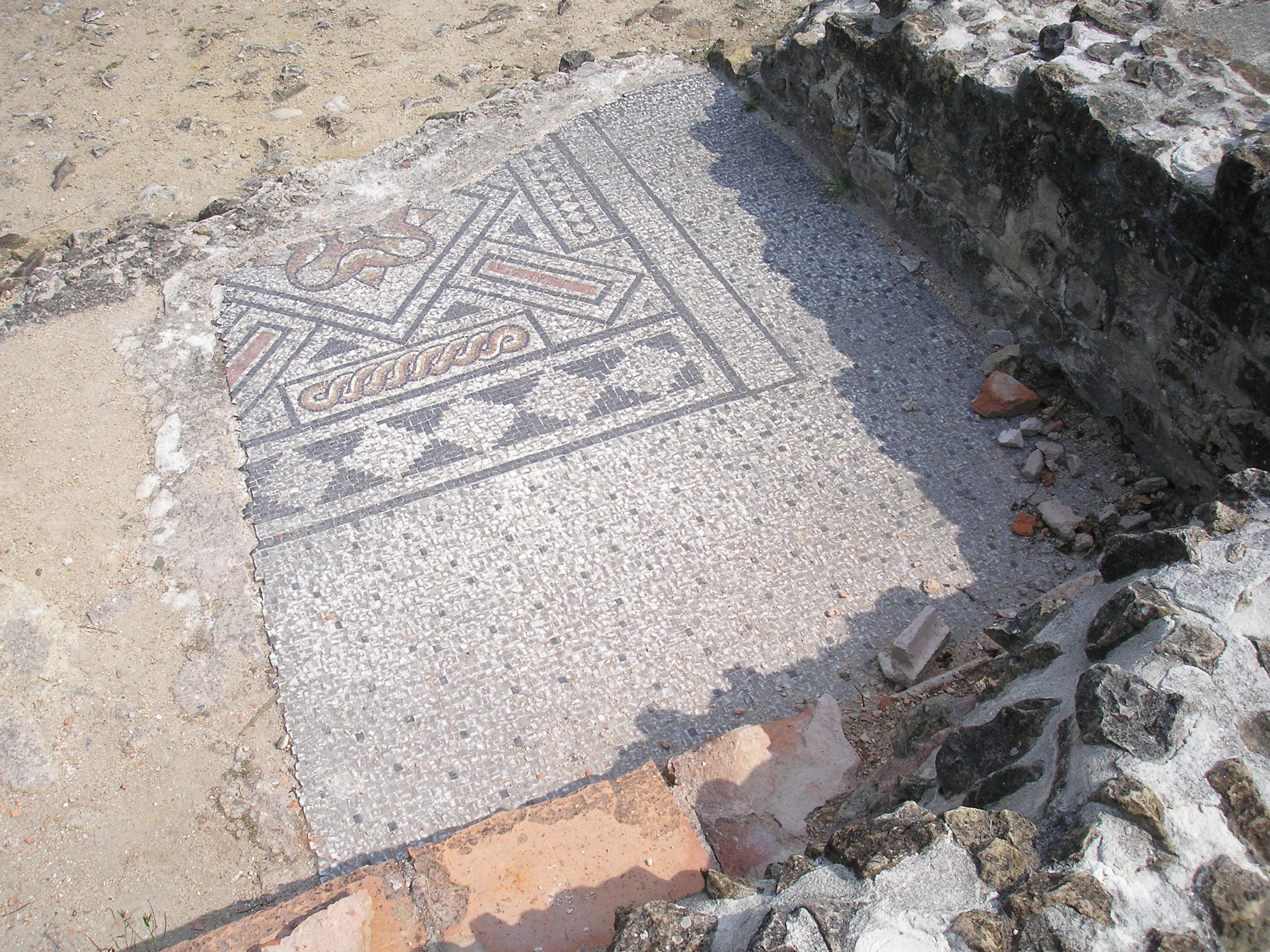
Mosaic restored in situ with trace of the destruction caused by the passage of the cardo

In the initial third of the fourth century, a new fire devastated the already nearly deserted edifice, prompting the commencement of material recoveries. (Note: Vipard 1998, p. 102) The cardo pierced the ruins around 330–340 AD, causing "considerable destruction," particularly in the west wing, as this opening destroyed three-quarters of the rooms that composed it. The site's continued occupation is indicated by the discovery of a hoard of 38 antoniniani in a pit containing butcher waste. Additionally, a coin of Gratian, struck between 368 and 375, was found elsewhere on the site. A similarly worn coin of Flavius Arcadius, also dated to this period, was also unearthed.

The house subsequently served as a resource for the recovery of building materials, initially on a sporadic basis and then on a larger scale between 475 and 550. This is evidenced by the discovery of a Frankish axe measuring 13.50 cm in length on the site. (Note: Vipard 1998, p. 103) The material recoverers focused their efforts on cutting the columns and transporting numerous fragments to lime kilns, where they proceeded with a comprehensive recovery of the collected elements. This process left behind only non-reusable items, including wattle, coatings, and small stones. While this destroyed some fragments, (Note: Vipard 1998, pp. 103–104) it also preserved others, allowing for the partial reconstitution of the decorative elements in their original context. Consequently, the house physically disappeared from the landscape at this time.

Subsequently, in the eighteenth century, topsoil was introduced to facilitate agricultural production, which resulted in the area assuming a distinctly rural character. (Note: Vipard 1998, p. 104)

== Rediscovery ==
=== Excavations ===
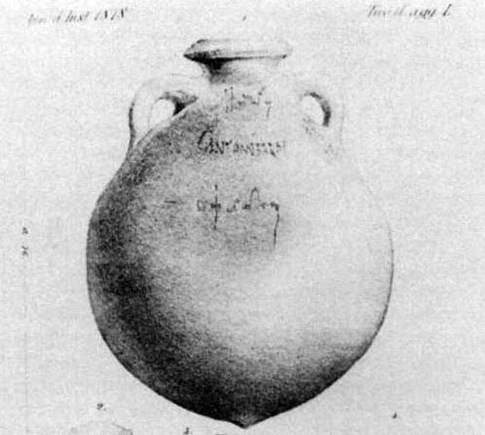
Engraving of a Dressel 20 amphora

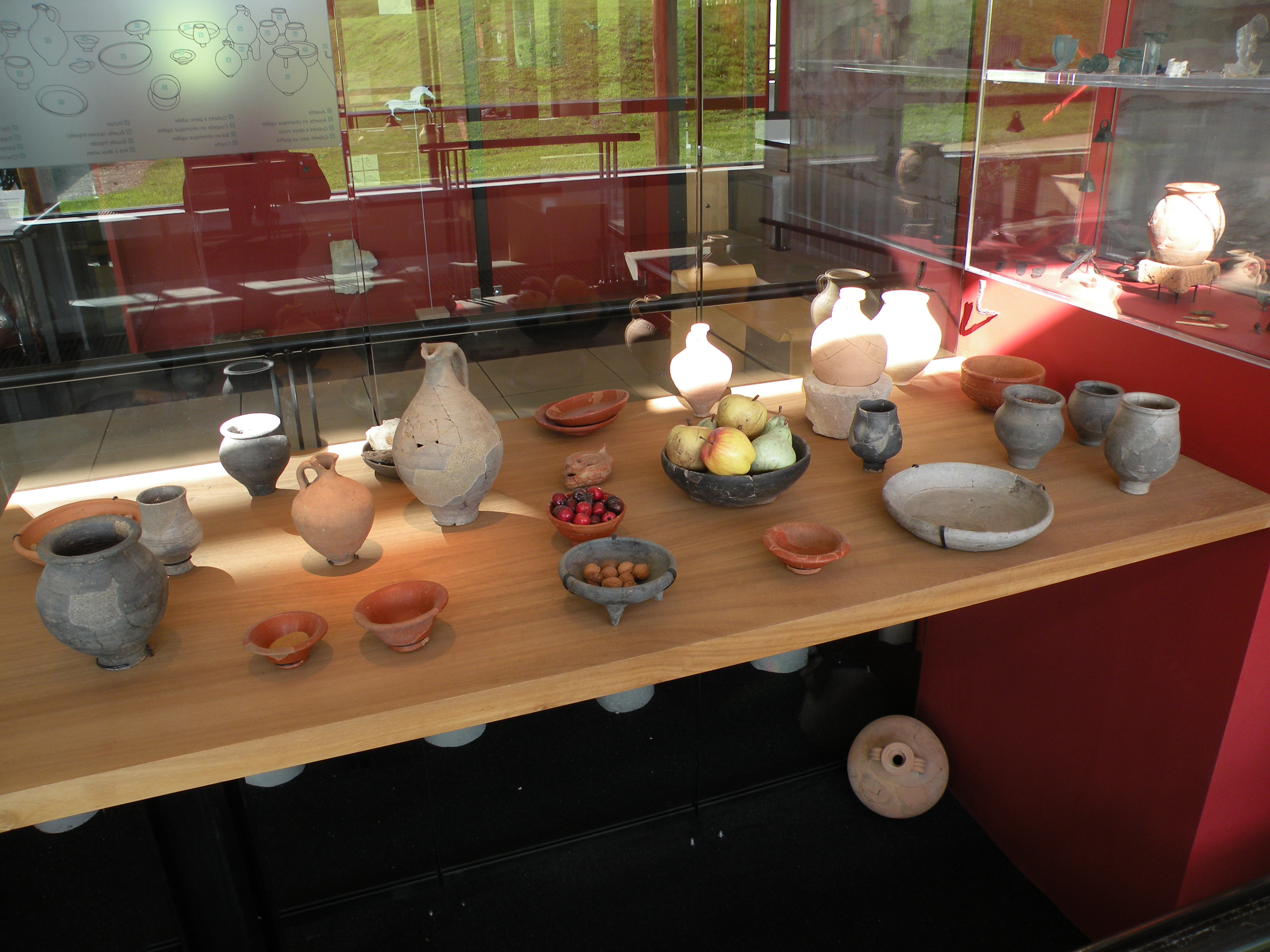
Presentation of a table from the Roman period at the Musée archéologique de Vieux-la-Romaine

Excavations commenced in Vieux as early as 1697, a full half-century before those at Pompeii and over a century after the discovery of the marble of Thorigny.

In 1812, the southern area of the house was explored by the owner, who discovered a mosaic. The Society of Antiquaries of Normandy conducted a new excavation in 1826, but only a fragment of the mosaic was found. No further excavations were conducted in Vieux in the 19th century that specifically concerned the building.

In 1988, the Departmental Council of Calvados initiated an archaeological excavation program in the commune, with a primary focus on the investigation of habitation sites. Subsequently, the house was excavated by Pascal Vipard between 1988 and 1991. (Note: Vipard 1998, p. 113) The absence of any construction above the ancient site enabled him to conduct his work effectively, resulting in these excavations becoming the most significant carried out in Vieux since 1864. The House with the Grand Peristyle was also the subject of Pascal Vipard's doctoral thesis, which was successfully defended at Paris IV in 1996 under the supervision of François Hinard. The title of the thesis was Une domus du quartier des thermes d'Aregenua (Vieux, Calvados). Contribution à l'histoire de l'habitat urbain en Gaule romaine (A domus in the Baths District of Aregenua [Vieux, Calvados]. Contribution to the history of urban habitation in Roman Gaul).

The study of the site enabled the tracking of the house's evolution from its construction to its destruction, with the identification of six distinct periods. A total of 677 coins were unearthed, none of which dated between the reigns of Commodus and Gallienus. Additionally, 770 kg of pottery was recovered; 140,800 shards, which substantiates the city's integration into the commercial routes of the High Empire. The majority of common pottery shards were sourced from present-day Sarthe, Picardy, and Dorset, while more luxurious pottery originated from central Gaul. The amphorae that were unearthed are believed to correspond to Dressel 20 amphorae, which were used for the transportation of Baetican oil, Narbonensian wine, or, on rare occasions, goods from Asia Minor, which were considered a highly valuable commodity. In addition, the site yielded 3,576 glass shards and the so-called Tutela Statue of Vieux-la-Romaine in August 1988. (Note: Vipard 1990, p. 251)

=== Restoration and public opening, new studies of archaeological material ===
Modern plan of the entire Vieux-la-Romaine site

Since its initial discovery, the house has been regarded as the sole surviving Roman-era edifice in Lower Normandy and the only preserved peristyle house in northern France.

Following refurbishment at the initiative of the Calvados General Council in September 1992, the house was presented to the public for the first time in July 1993. The restoration process sought to strike a balance between the preservation of the site and the advancement of educational objectives, akin to the approach taken at Saint-Romain-en-Gal or Jublains. While the elevations were not restored, a hypocaust was reinstated, accompanied by replicas of select decorative elements. The structure presented to the public represents the late 2nd-century to early 3rd-century House with the Grand Peristyle, (Note: Boislève 2011, p. 136) except for the preservation of the breakthrough in the 4th-century construction. (Note: Vipard 1998, p. 114)

However, the restoration entailed the selection of hypotheses that could subsequently be invalidated by subsequent studies. In particular, the southern section was only examined after the site's enhancement, resulting in a reconstruction that, in certain respects, did not align with the actual reality of the site. The painted plasters, partially studied in the early 1990s, were re-examined in 2010. This new analysis highlighted inconsistencies in the previously proposed reconstructions and raised ethical questions about the study of remains not treated "in a single study." Additionally, it highlighted the problem of the reversibility of the restorations carried out. (Note: Boislève 2011, p. 150)

== Description of the building at its peak ==
=== Architecture ===
==== General organization ====
Plan of the house at its monumental peak

The house occupies an area of 1,250–1,500 m^{2}, based on a Greco-Italic plan measuring 50.80 m by 30.80 m, including an enclosed space of 1,421 m^{2}. Its area places it among the largest residences in Gaul. (Note: Rioult & Vipard 1999, p. 190) The ground floor has 14 rooms and 5 corridors, and the upper floor is unknown but estimated by archaeologists to be 572 m^{2}. Additionally, the building features a facade gallery. The house, situated in the city center, was significant and visible on at least three sides. However, the extent of the destruction makes it challenging to ascertain the functions of the various residential rooms.

The foundations of the building, which extend up to two meters in depth, are robust and constructed of sandstone blocks. The walls are constructed using opus vittatum, a type of small local limestone, although some have rows of bricks. Among the materials used, Caen stone and travertine have been identified, (Note: Rioult & Vipard 1999, p. 191) and they bear tool marks. (Note: Rioult & Vipard 1999, pp. 194–195) The house was constructed using local materials and labor, which may have reduced the construction cost. However, the owner's wealth must have been substantial, as evidenced by the purchase of the plot, which often represents a significant portion of the operation. (Note: Vipard et al. 2007, pp. 230–231)

==== Ground floor organization ====
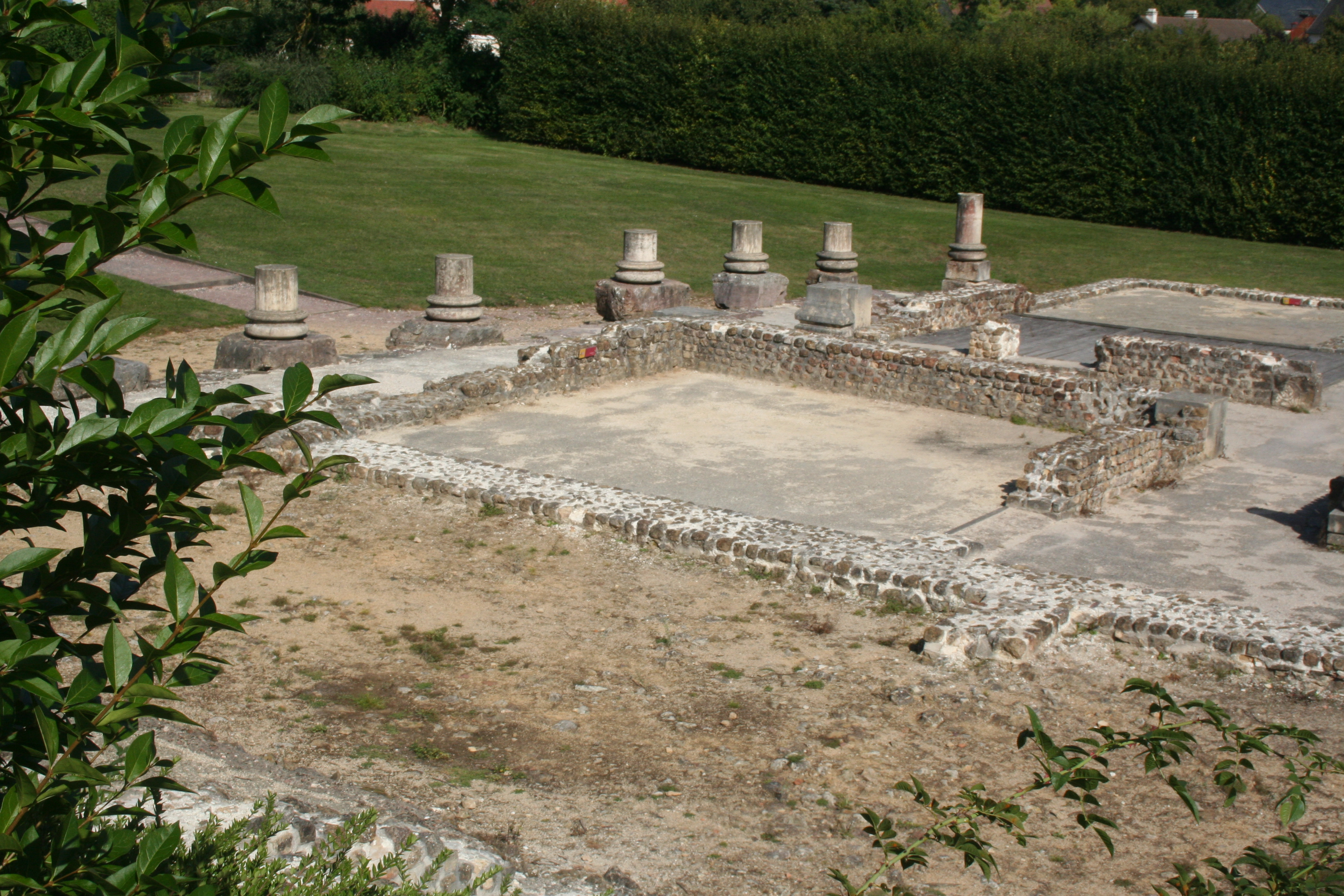
View from the current road to the colonnade facade

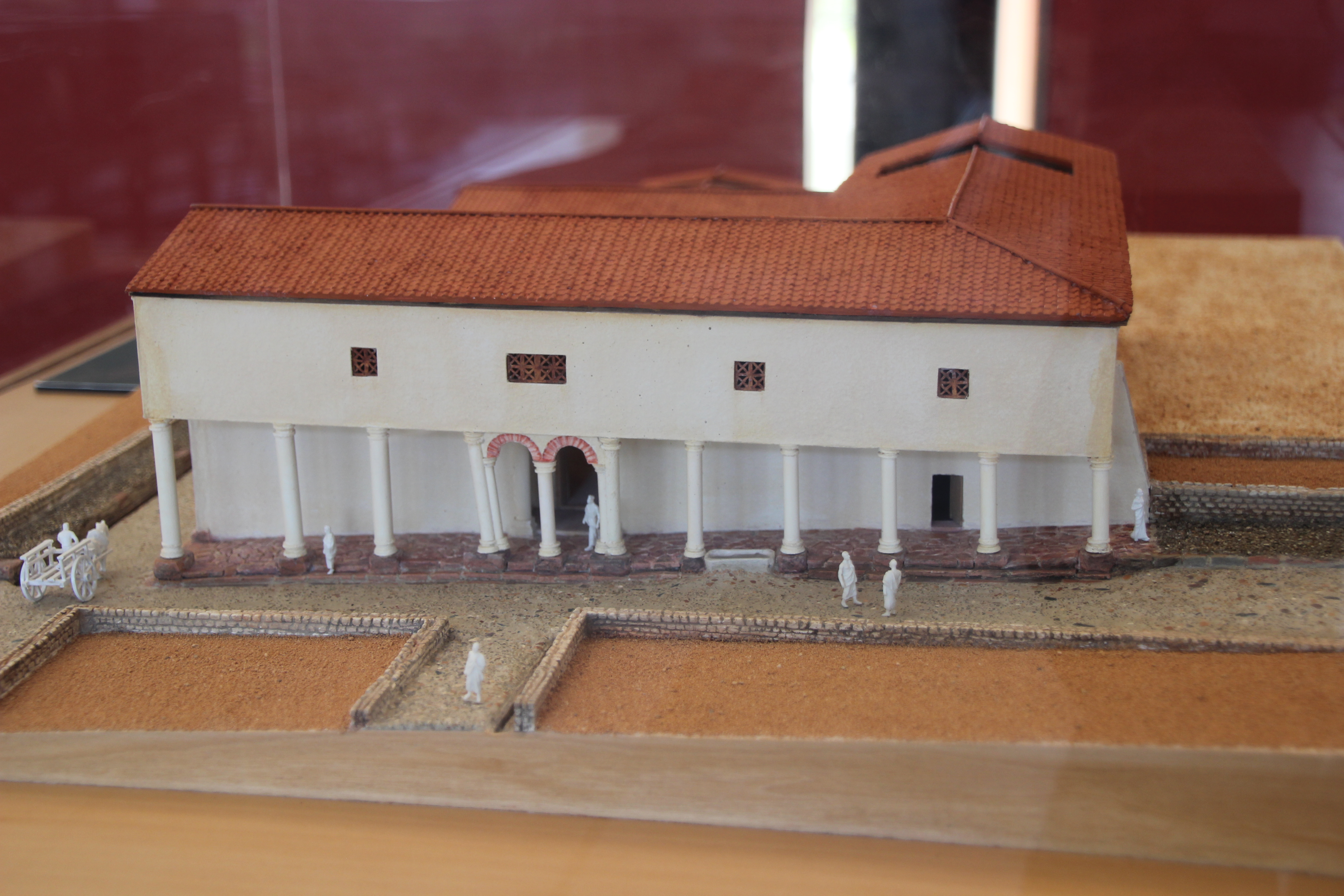
Model of the colonnade and front gallery, seen from the north

The ground floor had 14 rooms, in addition to 12 service rooms and five corridors and circulation areas. The house was arranged around a central courtyard, which featured a basin and was surrounded by a peristyle. A hypocaust system provided heating for several rooms. The domus also retained part of its original limestone flooring.

The gallery, measuring approximately 3.30 meters in width, spanned the entirety of the house's facade. Its northern orientation provided protection from precipitation for the building's occupants, while simultaneously supporting an upper floor. The gallery floor was constructed from local pink marble slabs, a notable exception in this city. The presence of smooth columns on the façade, indicated by rubble discoveries, suggests the existence of an upper floor. A bay with two arches marked the entrance to the house. This monumental entrance faced the cardo II and was intended to indicate the social rank of its owner, inspired by official architectural styles, notably the city gates of the time.

===== Scope of the former Eastern house =====
The entrance was marked by a two-leaf oak door measuring approximately one meter in width. The lock was discovered within the destruction layers following a fire. This door permitted access for the master's clients. The vestibule was divided into two sections and measured 3.60 m by 2.50 m. Two pilasters, 4.50 m in height, were embellished with mythological figures and were likely portraits of the owners. The second space corresponded to the fauces (vestibules) and was also decorated with pillars.

The dimensions of the lodge were 6 m by 4.30 m, and its construction had walls of opus vittatum, wattle, and daub. The floor was composed of a 0.21 m-thick wide plank and a 3 cm-thick plank. The surface of the planks suggests that the space was used for storage or commerce. Additionally, archaeologists identified the hatch of a staircase leading to the upper floor.

The kitchen, measuring 4.50 m by 4.75 m, featured a mortar floor and a well. Other service rooms were present in the same sector, including latrines coated with lime and connected to the external sewer via a conduit. These facilities were indicative of the house's affluence.

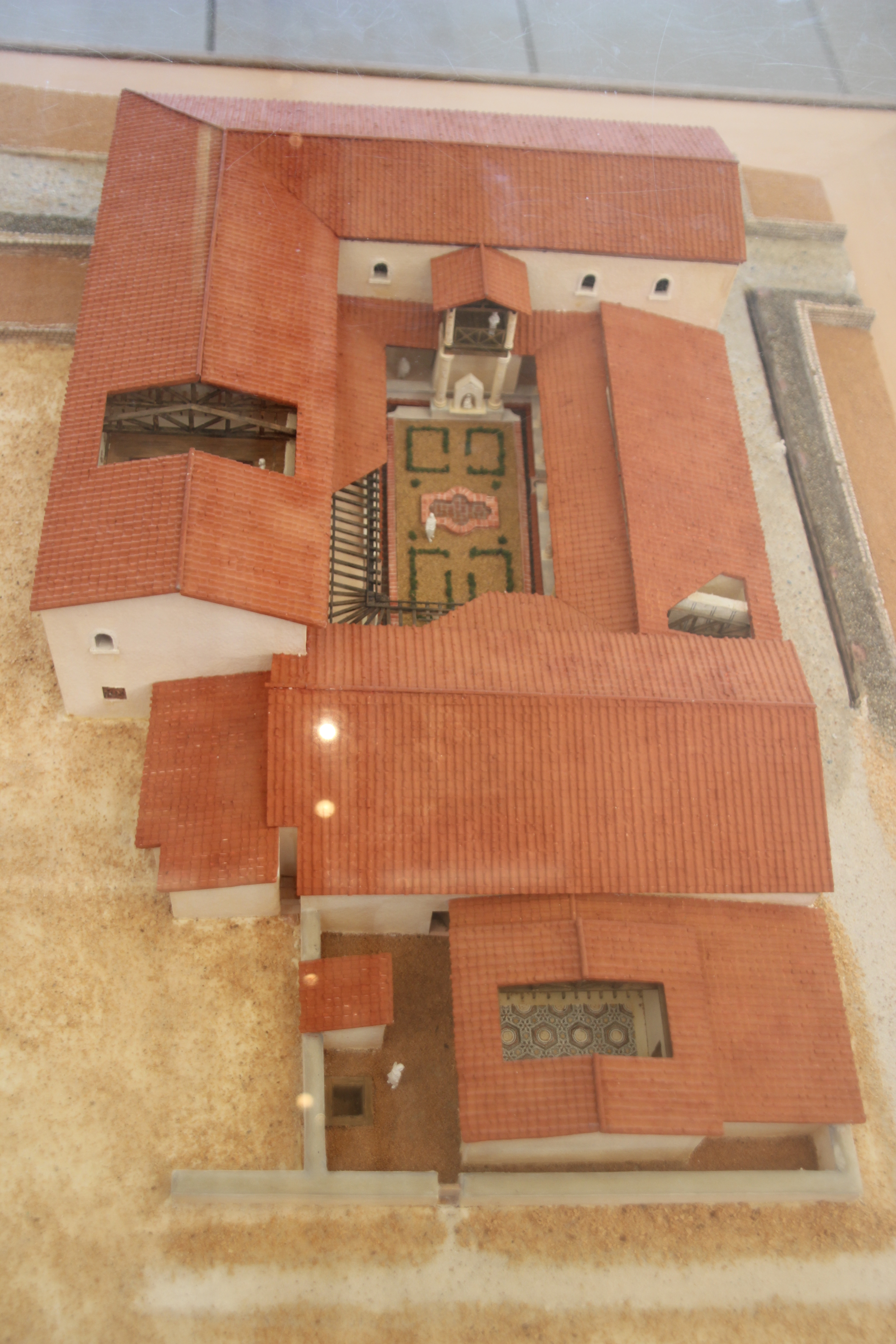
Model of the house in its monumental heyday, seen from the south

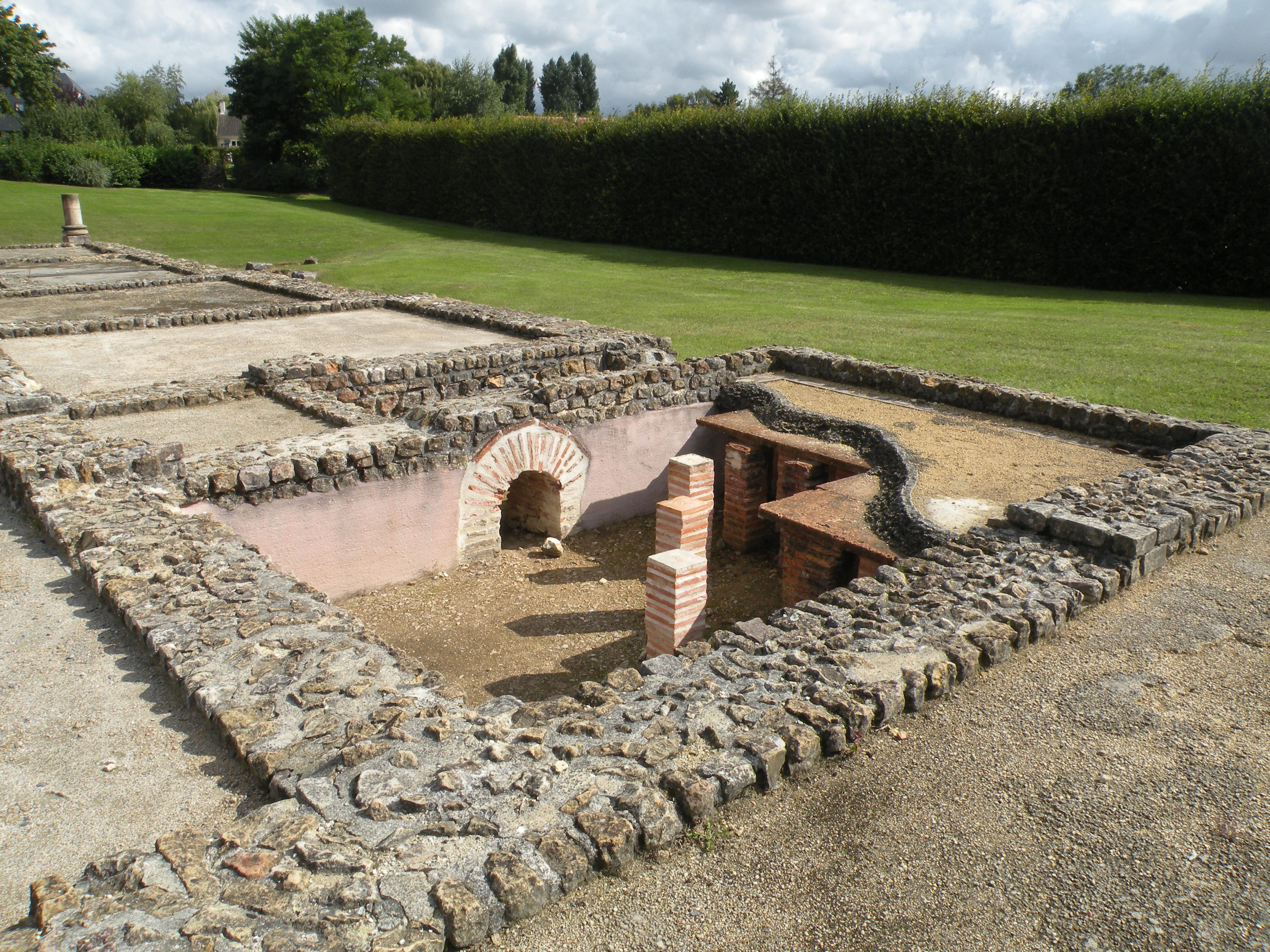
The hypocaust room and the succession of rooms in the east wing

Some rooms within the domicile were equipped with a hypocaust heating system, with a praefurnium situated nearby. One heated room, measuring 3.20 m by 4.80 m, exhibited a rich decorative scheme centered on an Eastern deity. The well-preserved hypocaust was restored and can now be observed in cross-section on the site; it retained elements of tile mortar and tubuli. The room's size suggests that it was used as an office or a bedroom. The praefurnium was accessible from the street. The bedroom and another room, probably an antechamber, communicated with the portico via a vestibule.

Some relatively large rooms, including one measuring 6 m by 5.80 m, could not be precisely identified in the southern part of the building. However, Vipard posits that one of them, equipped with wattle partitions, was a gathering place where the occupants habitually consumed alcohol together. The presence of coins dating from Vespasian to Marcus Aurelius, as well as a plethora of pottery and glass shards from the 2nd to the 4th century, lends credence to this hypothesis.

Additionally, a room measuring approximately 6.60 meters by 6 meters could not be identified. A long corridor, measuring almost 19 meters in length by 3 meters in width, had walls covered with plaster-bearing circles. This corridor had a secondary door or posticum opening onto cardo I, which was probably intended for private use by the occupants of the house. The western part of the corridor likely led to an unidentified location.

The remnants of the structures situated to the south were inadequately preserved, and some rooms are only identifiable today through the remaining negative walls. A porter's lodge with a pebble floor was identified, and a nearby room was determined to have served as a storage area for wood intended for the sector's praefurnium. The 1826 excavation is located in the vicinity, but the in-situ remains permitted a stratigraphic study: the room was heated, and the mosaic exhibited a geometric design that was replaced in the late period by a new contemporary mosaic when it was converted into a cold room. An open courtyard of over 50 m^{2} had a dirt and stone floor, with a door that provided access to the south. Traces of red plaster were found on one of the walls. Cellars with a capacity of 4 m^{3} to 10 m^{3}, which were closed by a lock and a tile cover, succeeded each other in the sector. An oyster tank was discovered, and in addition to food storage, the area revealed traces of textile craft and bronze work.

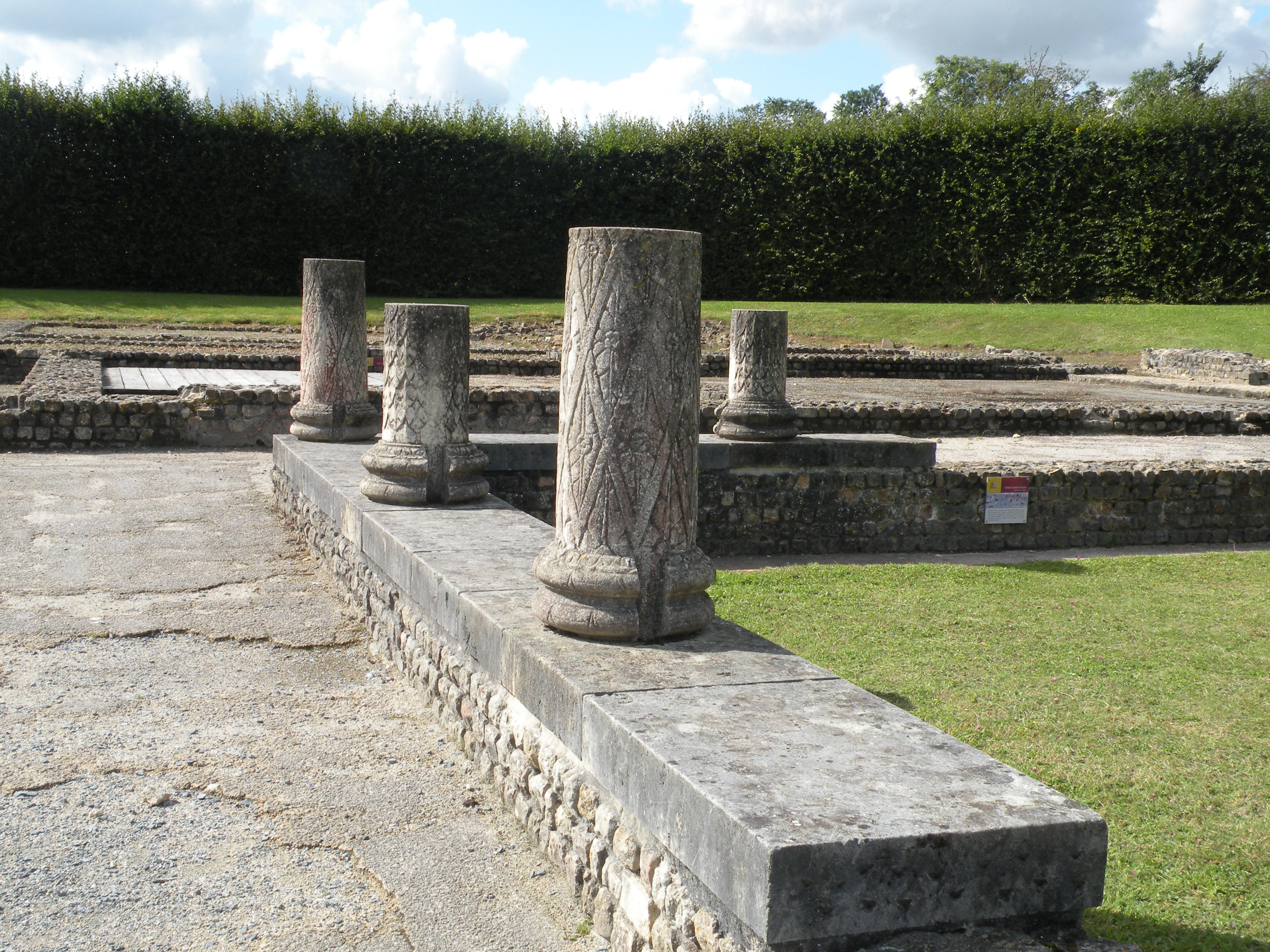
View of the west wing, from the peristyle.

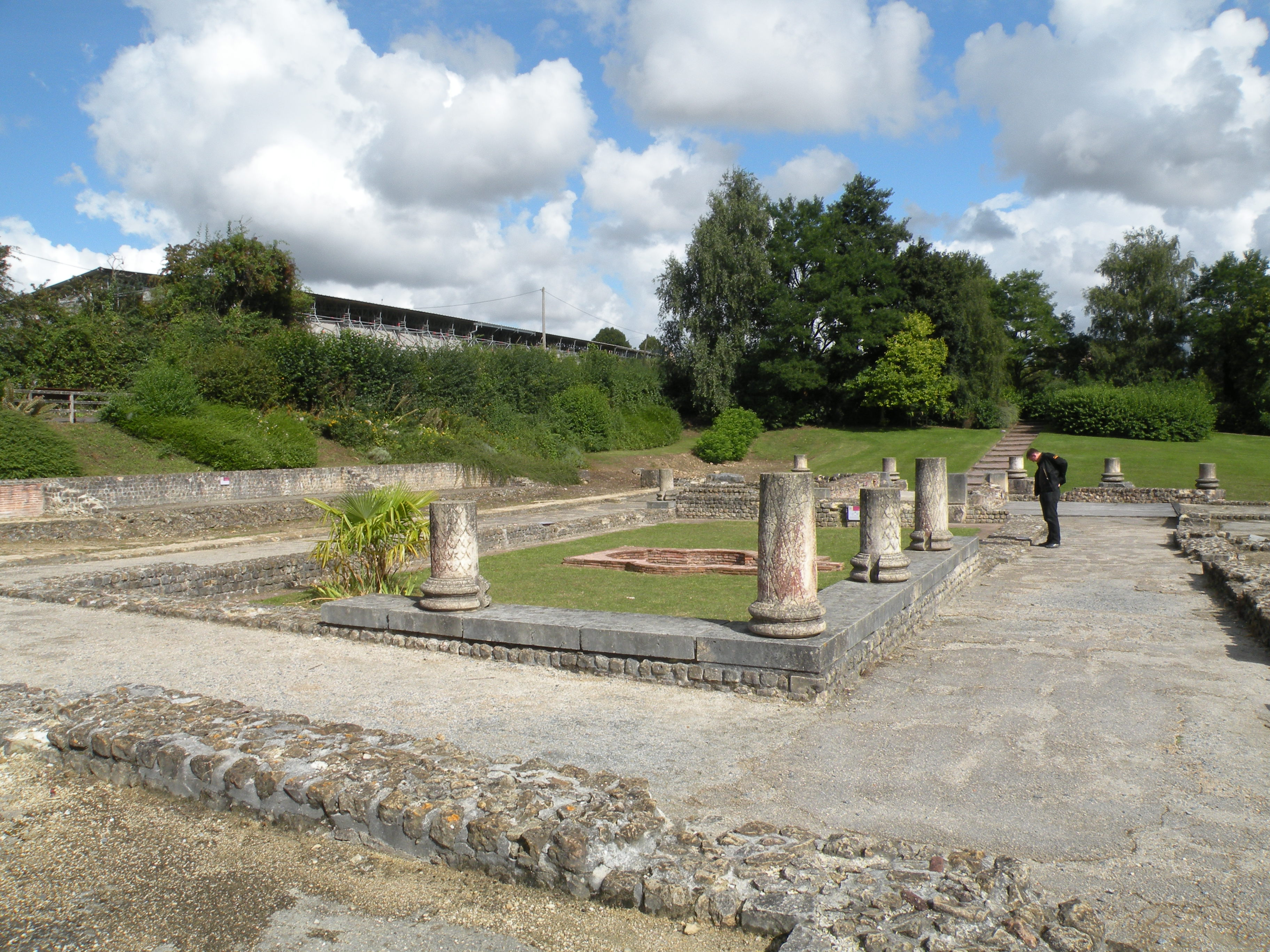
West wing, south view.

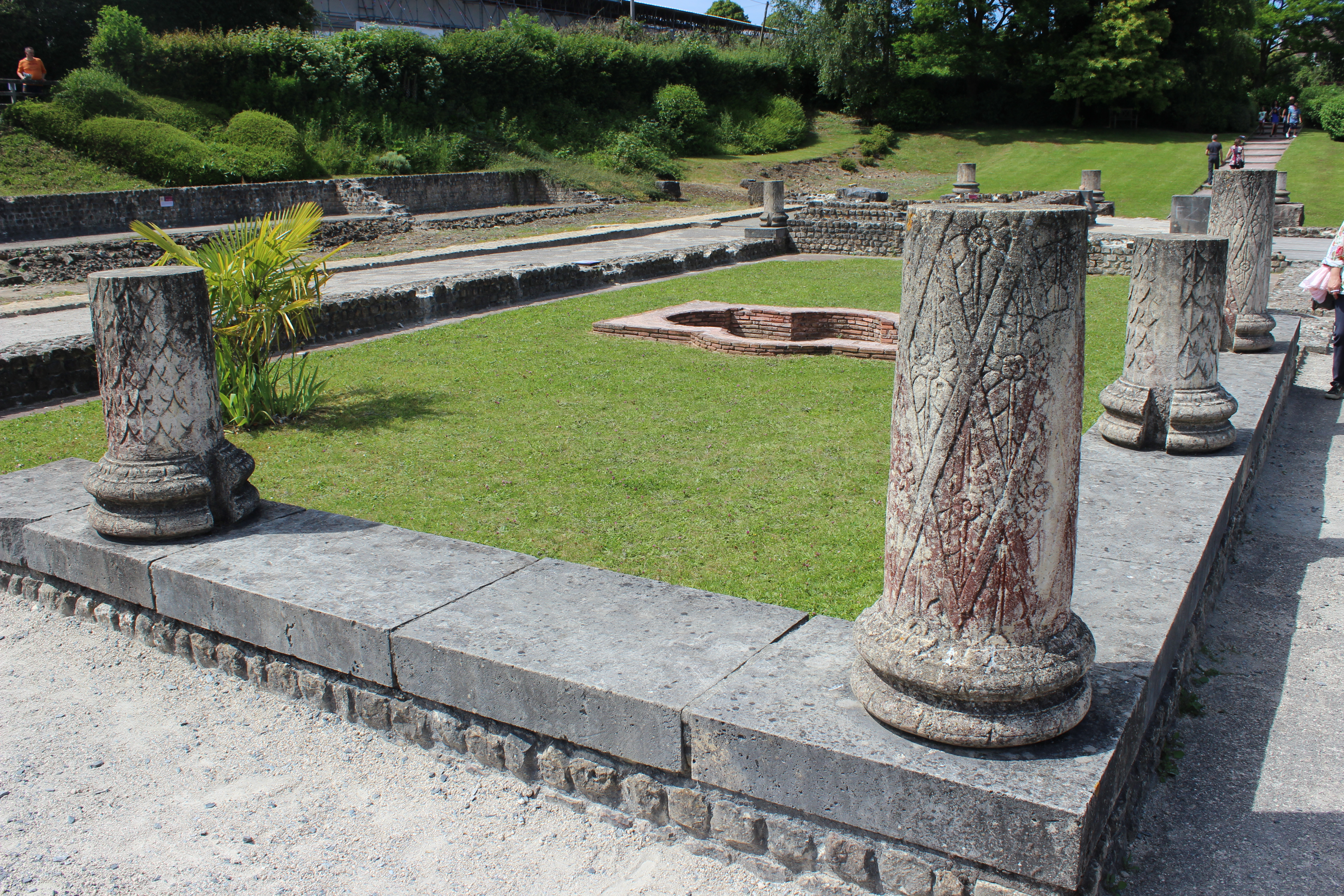
Garden seen from the south-east of the peristyle.

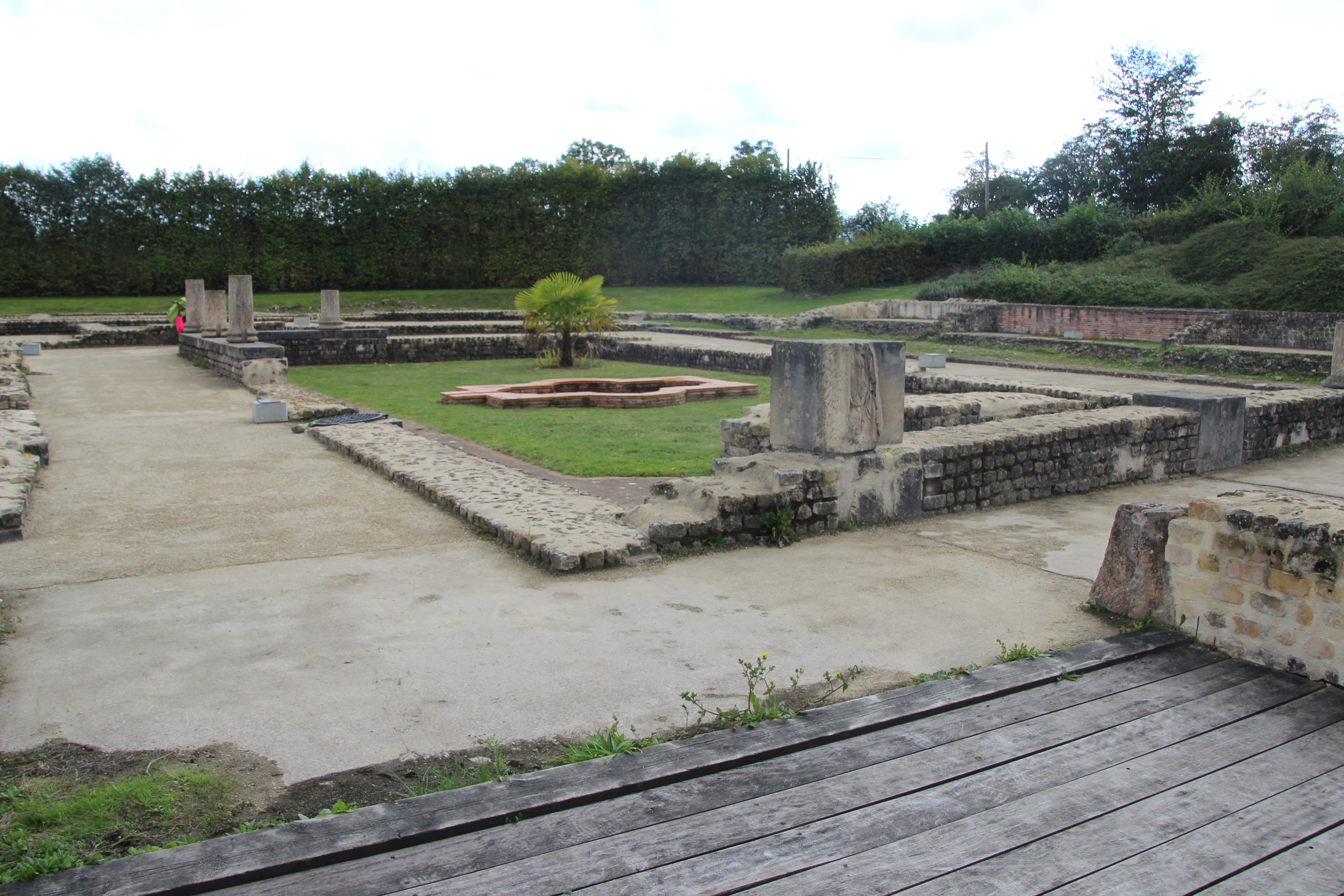
View of the west wing, from a utility room.

===== Scope of the former Western house =====
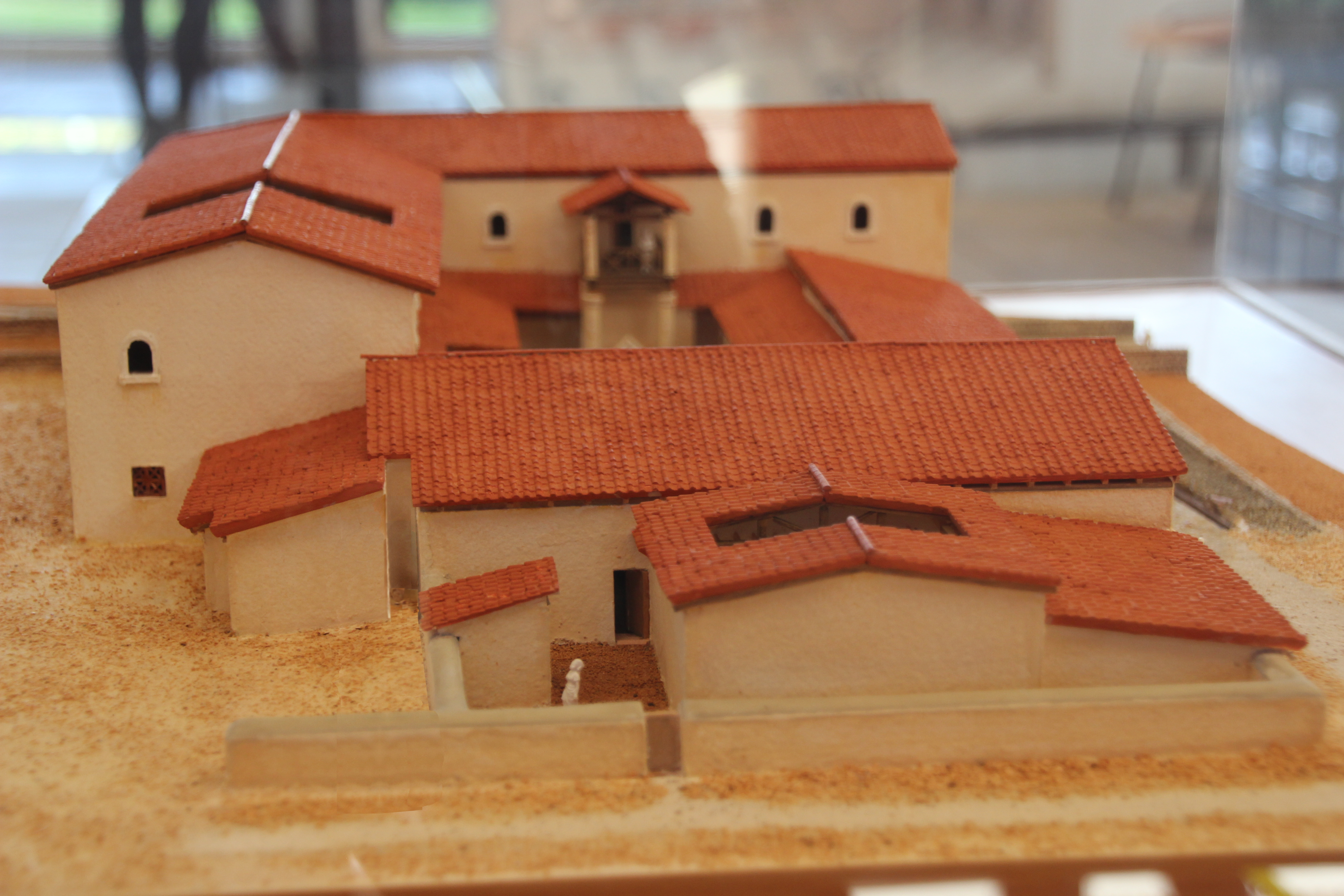
Model of the house, seen from the south

In the southwest region, archaeologists unearthed a praefurnium and a bathhouse that were associated with the Western House, which is believed to have preceded the House with the small peristyle. The praefurnium was supplied with fuel from the exterior. The area was damaged by the passage of the cardo through the center of the building during the Late Empire period. A bathtub was discovered within the caldarium. Given the state of preservation in this area, it was not possible to identify the water supply and drainage pipes. The remarkable state of preservation of these rooms, despite the extensive modifications to the building, may be attributed to the presence of this installation. The L-shaped room adjacent to it is believed to have served as an apodyterium or frigidarium. The existence of a private bathhouse indicates that the owners of this residence were among the wealthiest in the area, as such facilities were typically reserved for the most affluent households. However, the room was no longer heated, despite the continued occupation of the domus. This abandonment was likely due to the proximity of well-equipped bathhouses that fostered social interaction.

A reception room situated to the north of the bathing complex, measuring approximately 8 meters by more than 6 meters, exhibited a striking level of decorative richness, despite the impact of the cardo's passage. The room was potentially accessible from the viridarium and exhibited a height differential of 15 centimeters compared to the portico. Its design and furnishings were intended for dining and receiving guests and clients, given the evident aesthetic appeal of the room. Salons were indeed public spaces that opened onto the garden.

The largest room in the house is located to the north of this room, measuring 9.20 m by 7.80 m. This reception area was significantly impacted by the fire that occurred in the building, the opening of the street, and the predation related to the recovery of materials. The existence of two adjoining reception rooms is attested to by the House of Meleager in Pompeii. These rooms were likely used following the number of guests present. Nevertheless, the room cannot be classified as a triclinium, as this would have been an inappropriate seating arrangement for the Gallo-Roman dining customs. The south or west wall has preserved traces of plaster that were initially interpreted as evidence of a staircase leading to the upper floor. This interpretation was subsequently challenged by the 2010 analysis, which compared the plasters in question with similar elements found in Chartres. This comparison led Boislève to propose an alternative interpretation, namely that the plasters in question represent window frames. (Note: Boislève 2011, p. 139)

A room measuring 7.80 meters by 7.20 meters, which resembles a shop, is located on the north facade of the house. The room is simply decorated, with a mortar floor covered with plaster dating from the time of the western house. The shop, which was rented or operated by household staff, was destroyed by the opening of the cardo. A room to its left, also very simple, retains a section of the wall of the eastern house, which is "the oldest preserved."

At its apogee, the peristyle underwent a doubling in size and was subsequently furnished with a garden, or viridarium. The total area of the structure exceeded 322 m^{2}, with 130 m^{2} for the garden and 192 m^{2} for the porticoes. The area was furnished with a concrete tile floor and tasteful embellishments. A lararium was installed in its northern part, connected to a balcony or gallery located on the upper floor. Three sides of the peristyle were adorned with columns, while the portico had seven columns on the long side and four on the short sides. Excavations revealed numerous fragments of window glass. Access to the peristyle was through a reception room.

The southern facade of the building has yielded few archaeological discoveries. However, the traces of lean-tos and hearths of a common type found in villas, placed to minimize the risk of fire, have been identified. Additionally, the area appears to have served as a secondary kitchen, as evidenced by the shells, mussels, oysters, and whelks found there. Nevertheless, the boundaries of other spaces to the south and west remain undetermined.

==== Uncertainty about the organization of the upper floor ====
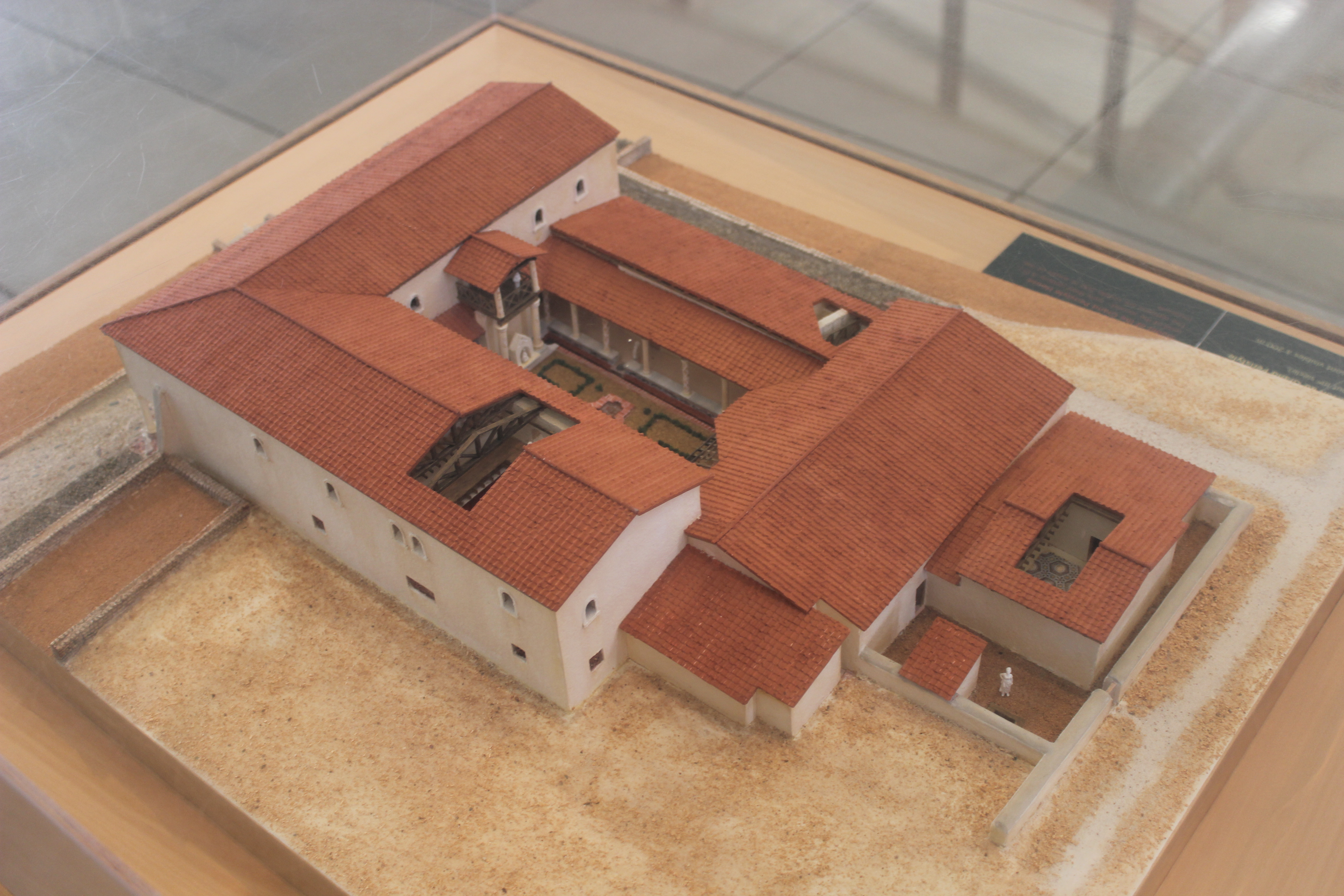
Aerial view of the model from the southwest, with floors on the north and west wings

In the early stages of development, houses with upper floors were primarily constructed for the lower socioeconomic classes. However, during the period of the Roman Empire, members of the aristocracy began to adopt this architectural style as a means of acquiring additional space and a vantage point over neighboring structures.

The presence of an upper floor in the House with the Grand Peristyle is indicated by the limited number of rooms observed. The precise number of living rooms on this floor, estimated at 570 m^{2}, remains uncertain. Archaeological evidence suggests that only the western and northern wings had a second level, likely due to the necessity of providing natural light while maintaining heated rooms in the wings without an upper floor.

===== Western wing =====
The thickness of the walls and the traces of plaster, which suggest the presence of a staircase, provide evidence that an upper level exists for the western wing. Additionally, a collapsed wall in the garden, which was not destroyed during material recovery, offers further insight.

The rooms on the upper floor were accessible through a richly decorated room, which provided evidence of the existence of noble rooms on the upper floor. In the garden, a masonry block was uncovered near the vestibule, which may have supported a balcony on the upper floor with columns decorated with Bacchic motifs and possibly a lararium on the ground floor, according to a traditional layout.

===== Northern wing =====
The presence of debris in the northern wing provides further evidence of the existence of an upper floor. Additionally, the spacing of the columns in the facade gallery indicates that there may have been an upper floor overlooking the exterior portico. Furthermore, the discovery of a staircase shaft lends further support to this hypothesis.

It is possible that this upper floor was constructed at an early stage of the building's history. Archaeological excavations revealed the presence of remnants of wattle and daub, wood, and nails, which were used in a construction method that allowed for a lighter structure.

=== Facilities ===
==== Heating ====
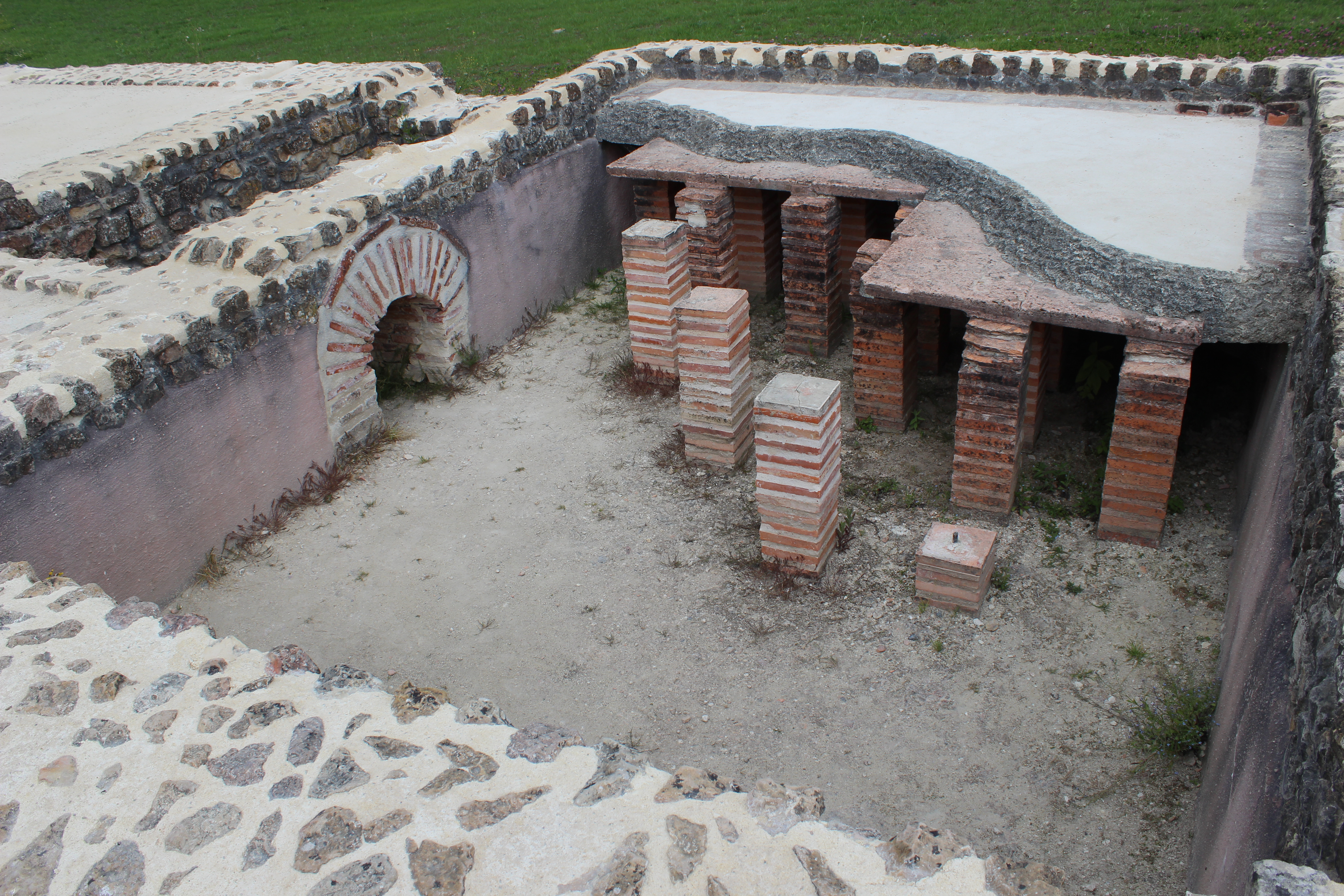
Hypocaust system

The Mediterranean plan of the house in these northern latitudes necessitated adaptations to the building, as evidenced by the use of wattle and daub, the presence of a portico closure system, and a heating installation. Four rooms had a hypocaust system, and others probably had braziers.

A fireplace constructed from tiles was installed at a late stage of construction in a room dating from the period of the House with the Checkerboard Mosaic. This furnishing serves to indicate the deterioration of living conditions for the occupants of the house during the late period.

==== Water ====
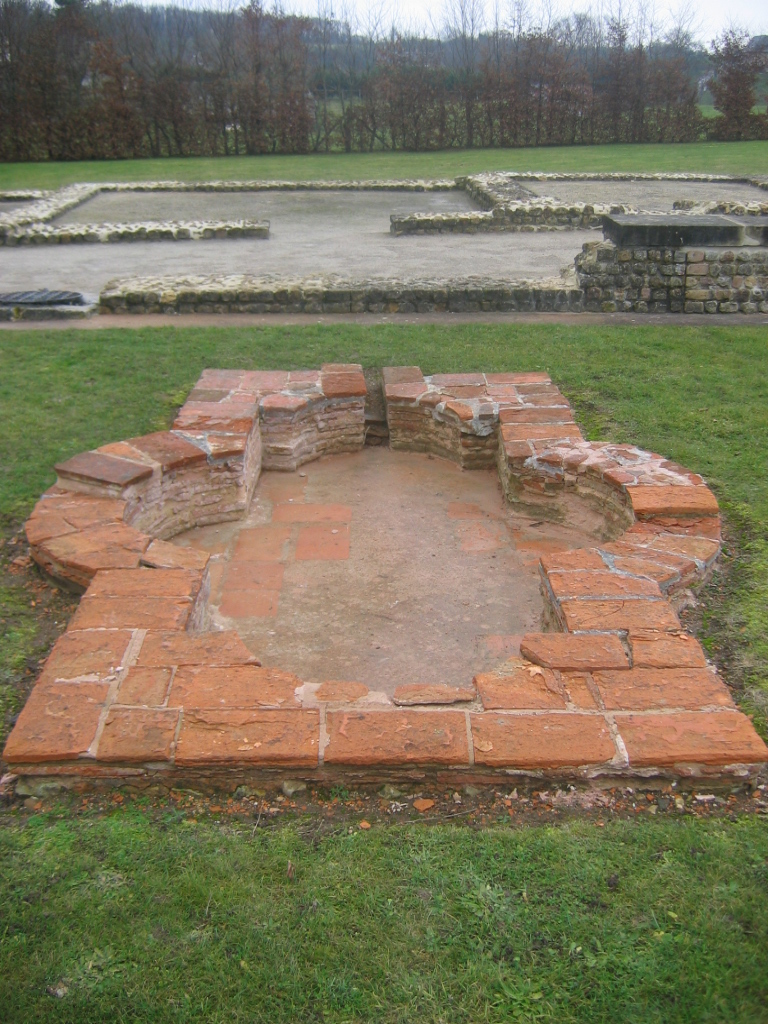
Pond in the garden of the House with the Grand Peristyle

The city's sewer system was found to be lacking in sophistication. The house required a water drainage system, particularly for rainwater, due to its 1,300 m^{2} of roofs and wastewater. A brick and concrete conduit was discovered, extending from the house to the decumanus, with additional wooden conduits likely present. The lead pipes were recovered; the excavation revealed an oak conduit assembled with iron.

The house had two wells for its water supply, one of which was located between the garden and the portico and had a depth of 6.60 meters. Excavation of this well yielded remains from the 1st to the 4th century. The second well, located in a room bordering the colonnade, yielded no results. The house was also connected to the public water system, with garden features requiring pressurized water to function.

A conduit was constructed to channel water to the bathroom in the west wing. Another conduit was installed to carry water from the garden basin to the latrines and passed through the northeast corner of the portico, where it was divided into three sections. Access to water from the public system was a privilege reserved for a select few, potentially members of the college of decurions. This is illustrative of the adoption of a lifestyle and a "need for social representation," which is indicative of the building's luxury. The presence of fountains and water jets thus brought the building closer to the baths.

==== Other facilities ====
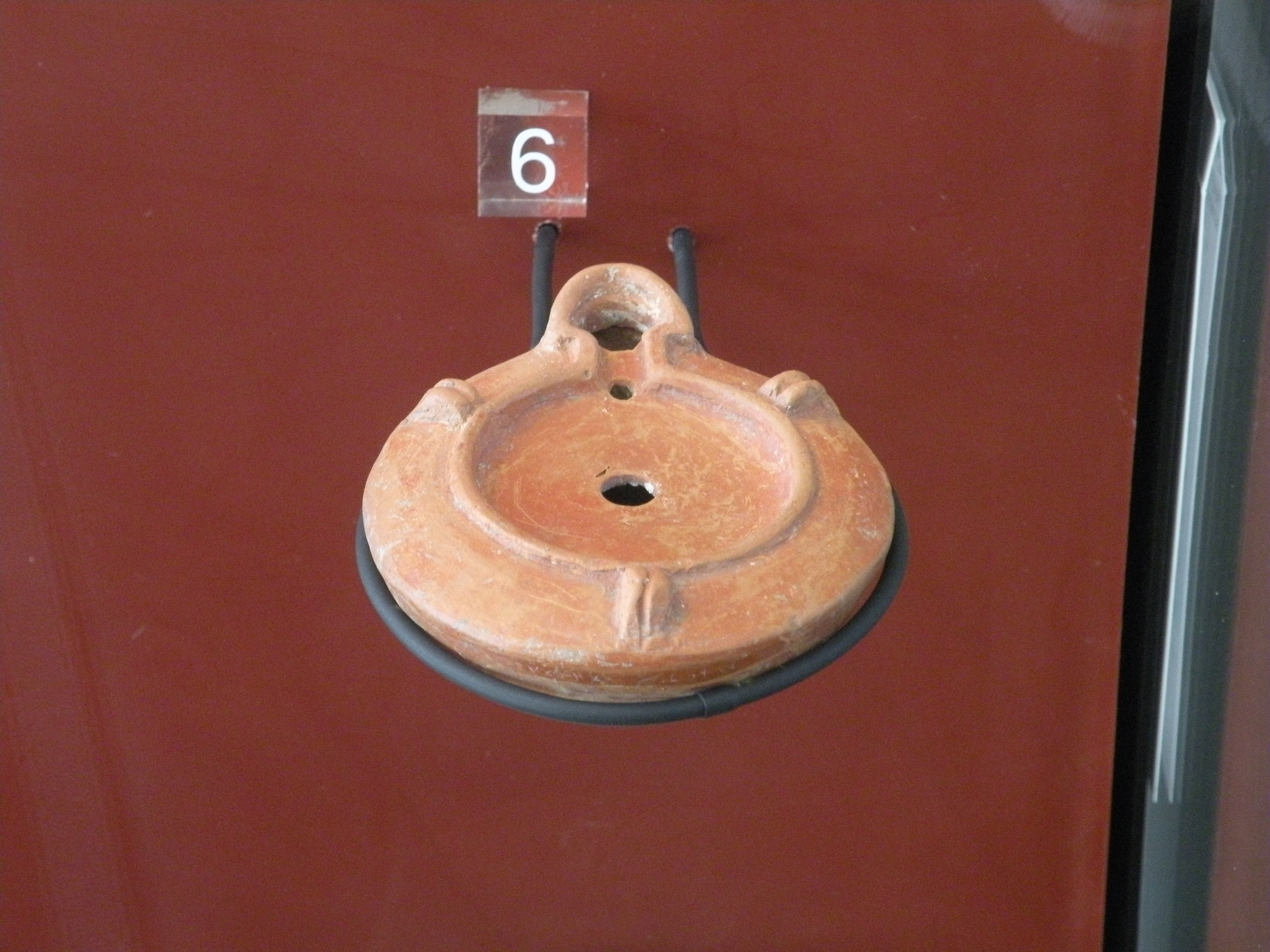
Vibianus oil lamp

The archaeological excavations unearthed many illuminating artefacts, including three oil lamps, one of which bore the name Vibianus. In addition, supports for candles or torches were also discovered. The only bronze object found on the site was a fragment of a candelabrum.

A considerable number of locks and keys were unearthed during the archaeological excavations. The majority of the keys were for specific rooms and were used to regulate access for various visitors.

The excavations also yielded artifacts related to writing, including seal boxes and styluses. This evidence indicates that writing was a common practice among the occupants of the house.

=== Decor ===
The excavations revealed a variety of decorative elements, including painted and mosaic surfaces, which were typical of this architectural style. Additionally, there were some highly detailed sculptures, although these were largely incomplete. The highest quality of decoration was found in the main rooms of the house, namely the entrance, viridarium, and salons.

==== Frescoes and mosaics ====
===== Frescoes and stucco =====
The entire interior of the house was painted, and the building must have presented "a very colorful appearance." (Note: Boislève 2011, p. 140) The chromatic range used was varied, including the use of very expensive vermilion red. (Note: Boislève 2011, p. 142) During the excavations, 850 boxes of plaster remains were collected. However, the house has preserved few identifiable painted plasters, with lime and sand being the main elements found in the destruction layers. Nevertheless, five rooms yielded decorative elements dated to the time of the House with the Small Peristyle.

One of the rooms with a hypocaust exhibited a sophisticated decorative scheme, including a painted pediment in vermilion. This location probably housed a statue of an oriental god in stucco, wearing a Phrygian cap and identified as Attis. (Note: Boislève 2011, p. 145) However, there is no evidence to prove the presence of a niche. (Note: Boislève 2011, p. 148) The deity was treated in a somewhat clumsy manner in terms of proportions and facial features. (Note: Boislève 2011, p. 148) The use of cinnabar and stucco relief is indicative of the resources that were employed for the house's decoration, which places it "among the luxurious ensembles known in Gaul."

In addition to the lararium, the houses were adorned with various deities by the owners' preferences. The 2010 study elucidated several details. The lower area was embellished with green and yellow marble imitation decorations, vermilion red panels, and burgundy spaces with pediments. The borders were embellished with scenes featuring Erotes. Stucco was placed in the borders (Note: Boislève 2011, pp. 145–147) and fixed with nails. Julien Boislève emphasized the presence of ceiling decorations, both painted and stuccoed. (Note: Boislève 2011, pp. 147–148)

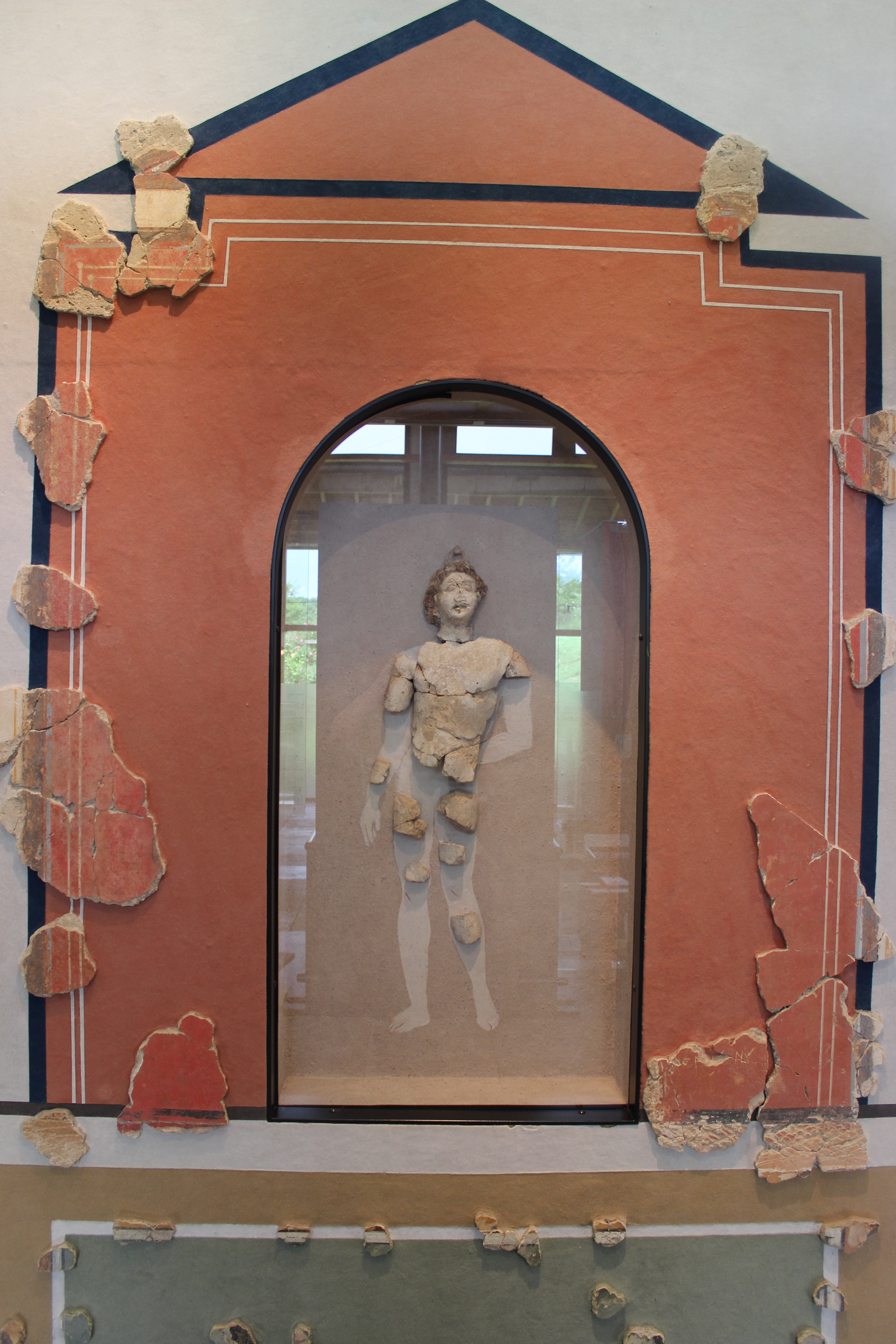
Oriental divinity.

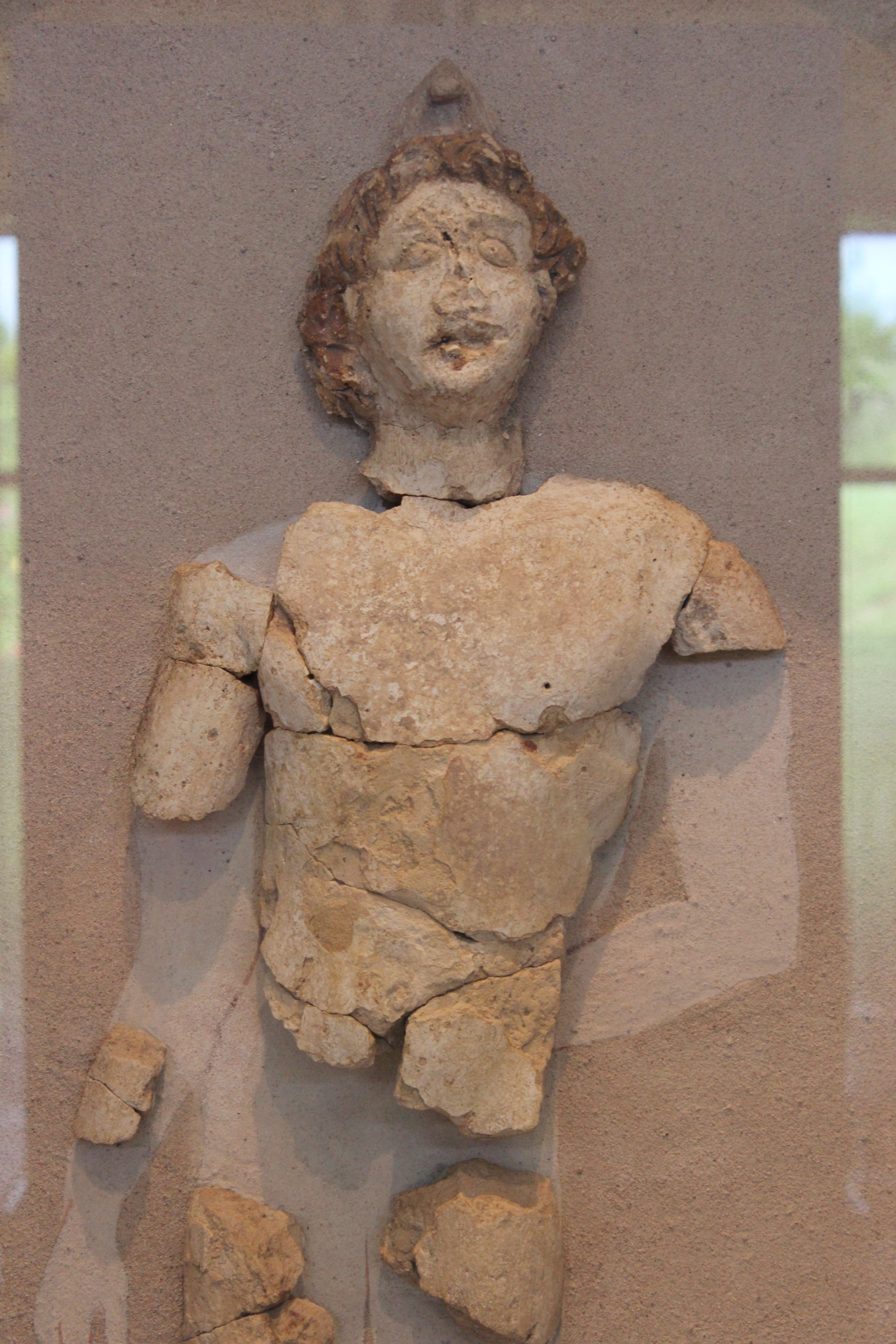
Detail of Oriental divinity.

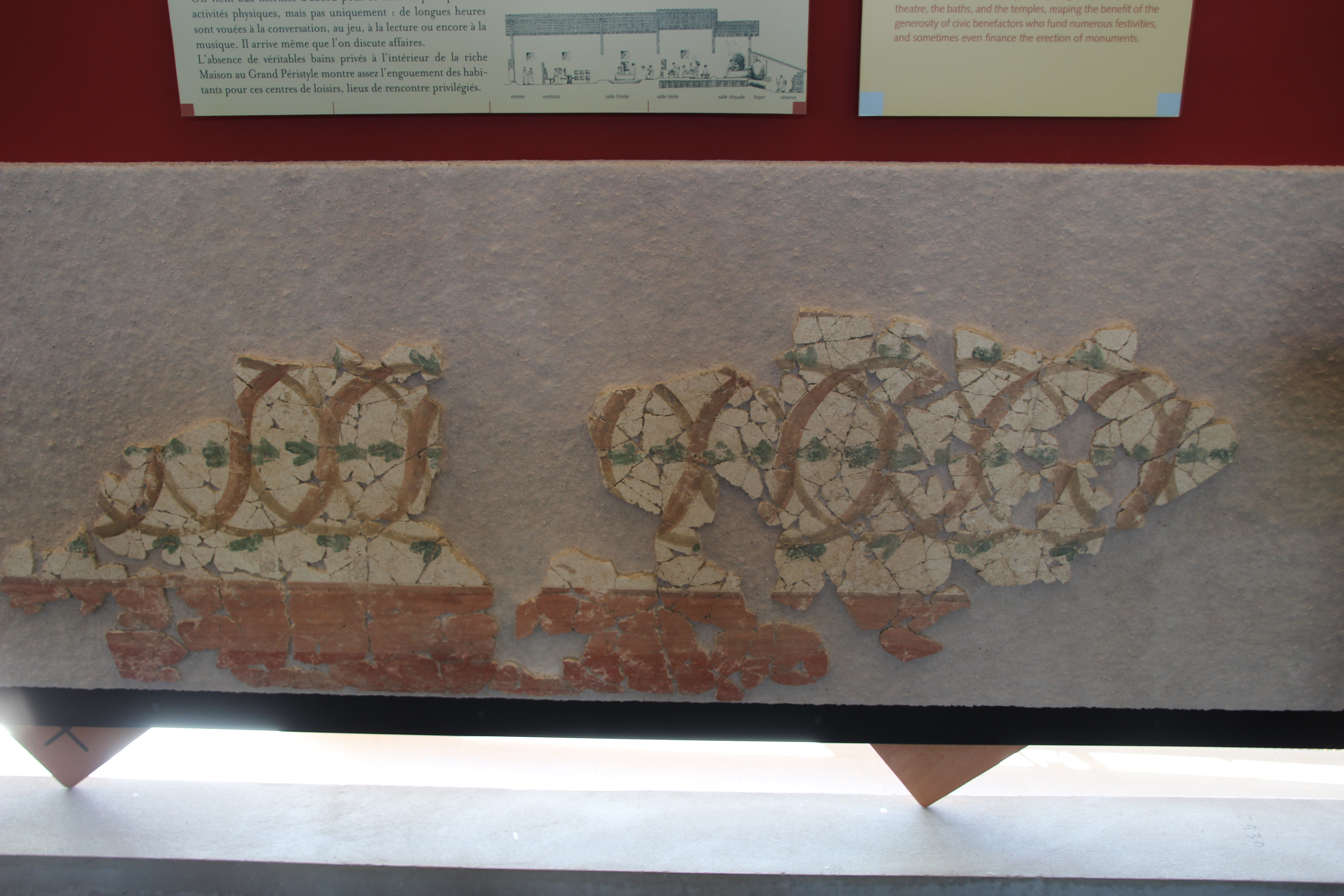
Hallway fresco with circles

In the southern section of the residence, a lengthy corridor (Note: Boislève 2011, p. 143) was adorned with intersecting and tangent ocher and red circles, measuring 0.25 m (or 0.27 m (Note: Boislève 2011, p. 143)) in height and positioned against a white backdrop. The band measures approximately 0.39 meters in width and features a red stripe at the upper and lower edges, with circles created through the use of a compass. The fresco was discovered in a flattened state, which led the excavator to conclude that it was situated in the lower portion of the walls. The 2010 study of the plaster fragments yielded new findings that corroborated with those already in the museum collection, prompting inquiries into the reversibility of restorations. A comparison of the motif's usage in other second- and third-century houses (Mané-Véchen, Bavay, or Andigny-en-Bassigny) and observation of the relatively smooth reverse of the fragments indicate that the decoration was more likely a ceiling border. The motif is suitable for corridors or cryptoporticoes. (Note: Boislève 2011, p. 144) A room located to the north of this corridor featured an imitation marble veneer. (Note: Boislève 2011, pp. 148–149) On the other side of the corridor, another room revealed a fresco and stucco decoration that was reminiscent of marble. (Note: Boislève 2011, p. 149)

The room situated to the left of the principal entrance to the edifice in question contained fragments of stucco that could be regarded as elements of a ceiling.

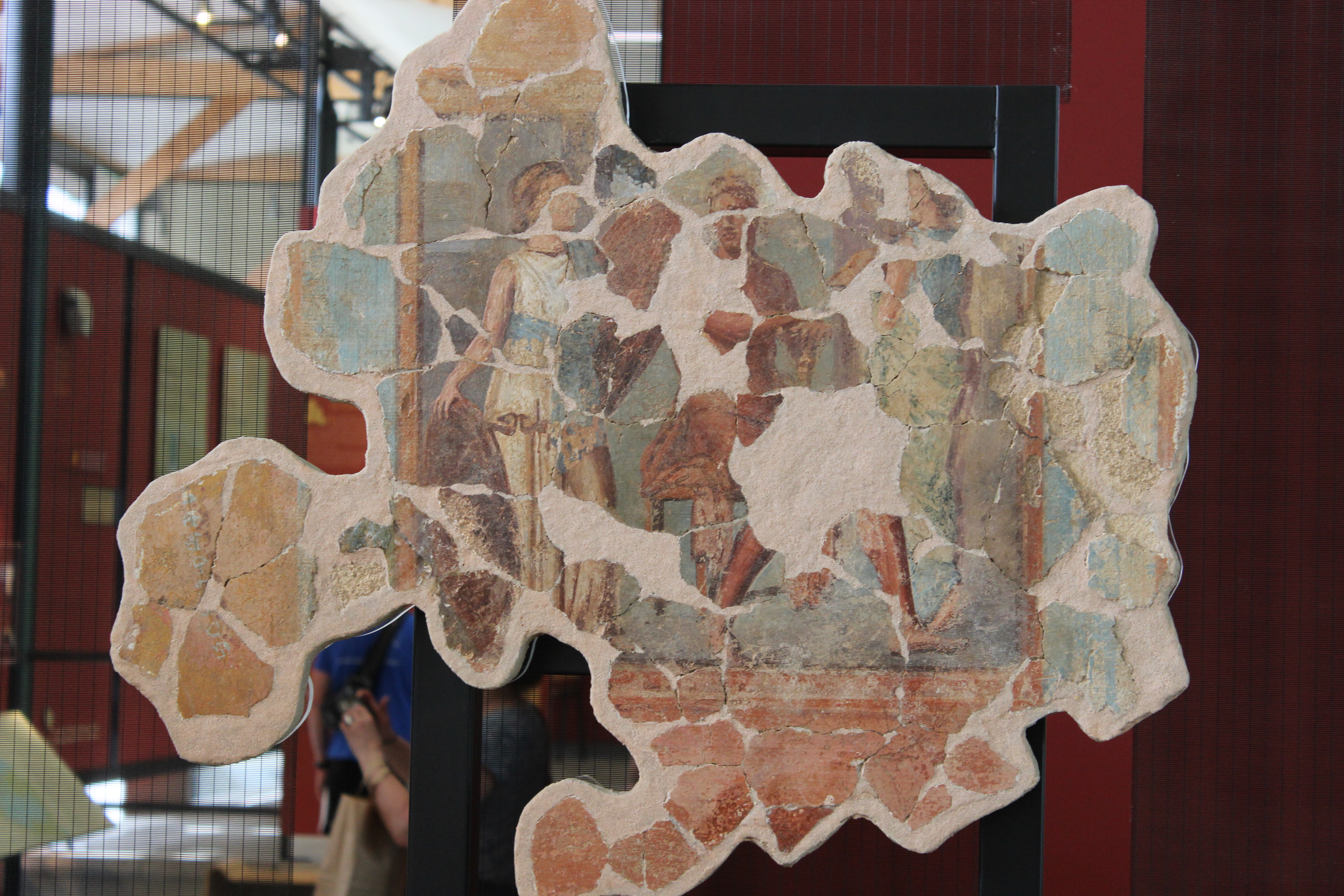
Mythological fresco

A room in the old western house, covering 52 m^{2}, (Note: Boislève 2011, p. 140) despite the destruction caused by the cardo's passage, yielded fresco fragments, including a 0.50 m square panel depicting a mythological scene. The composition is centered on a wooden seat, on which a man is seated (Note: Boislève 2011, pp. 140–142) with a sword hilt in hand. To his right, a woman in a Greek tunic holds shields, while another female figure extends a helmet to the hero. (Note: Boislève 2011, p. 142) The scene is believed to be from the Iliad, which depicts the handover of weapons before the Trojan War. This fresco may depict Achilles and Thetis from the period of the House with the small peristyle. Thetis presents the hero with weapons crafted by Hephaestus, and the second female figure may be Briseis. Such scenes represented the pinnacle of painted decoration. This particular example is the work of a highly talented painter and a particularly skilled workshop. These scenes are primarily documented within the third and fourth Pompeian Styles. The 2010 study identified two additional representations, both of which were severely damaged: one exterior scene featuring a male torso and an extended arm, and the other, fragments of what may have been a hand or paw. Boislève posits the possibility of a coherent mythological painting cycle, potentially that of Achilles. It is not uncommon to find consecutive paintings addressing a single theme in the staterooms of Pompeii; however, such a configuration is rare in Gallic homes. (Note: Boislève 2011, pp. 142–143) The room also featured another scene, a polychrome mosaic, and a statue of a deity, presumed to be the tutela of Aregenua.

In the 72 m^{2} room situated near the hall where the Thetis and Achilles painting was unearthed, painted embellishments initially identified as about a staircase were subsequently uncovered. The room exhibited a scene of unidentified figures and a ceiling decorated with geometric motifs. The 2010 analysis revised this interpretation. The decor initially attributed to the ceiling is now attributed to the lower parts of the walls, which are decorated with shield bases. The central portion of the wall exhibited a conventional framing motif and inter-panels embellished with vegetal candelabras. (Note: Boislève 2011, pp. 136–137) A partially nude figure clad in blue drapery was discerned, suggestive of a dancer. The upper section of the wall is presumed to have featured a stucco cornice. (Note: Boislève 2011, p. 139) The overall composition is original, with the lower portion representing the "true originality of this decor."

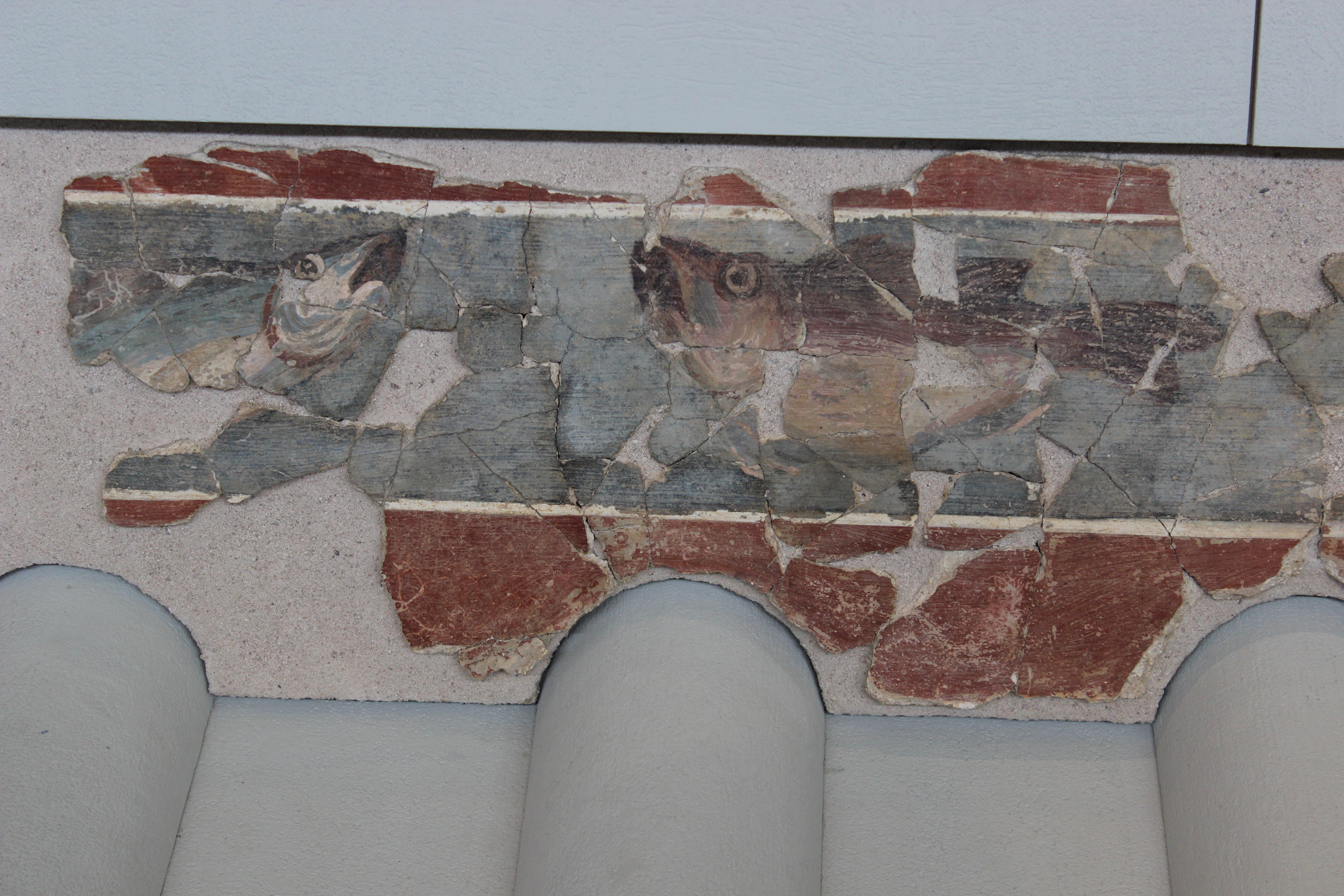
Detail of the fish frieze in the peripheral basin

Additionally, architectural elements and a representation of marble were observed, along with a partial human skeleton. The incorporation of columns into the design may have been intended to elevate its perceived prestige, while the presence of painted scenes could have served a commemorative function.

In the garden, among the multitude of elements, only a frieze of fish, (Note: Boislève 2011, p. 149) with seven preserved figures, was identified. The fresco was of exceptional quality and decorated the edge of the peripheral basin, extending along the stylobate of the portico. (Note: Barbet 2012, p. 304) Vipard's initial interpretation was that the fresco was located above a roof. However, the results of the 2010 analysis may challenge this interpretation. The analysis revealed that elements of a nude body seem to be connected to the whole, and the fresco appears to extend above the fish frieze. This challenges the museum's initial presentation of the findings. (Note: Boislève 2011, p. 150) The fish, set against a background measuring 0.15 meters in height and painted in shades of blue, are not realistic in appearance. Rather, they are intended to populate the basin. The association of such a painting with a basin is, according to Alix Barbet, "a remarkable example." (Note: Barbet 2012, p. 304)

===== Mosaics =====
There are only a few mosaics in Vieux. Of the ten works discovered on the site, five originate from the House with the Grand Peristyle. The geometric mosaics were examined in their archaeological context and were found to differ from older finds such as the great Lillebonne mosaic. The materials studied were not solely local, indicating the presence of Eduens artisans. (Note: Rioult & Vipard 1999, pp. 192–194)

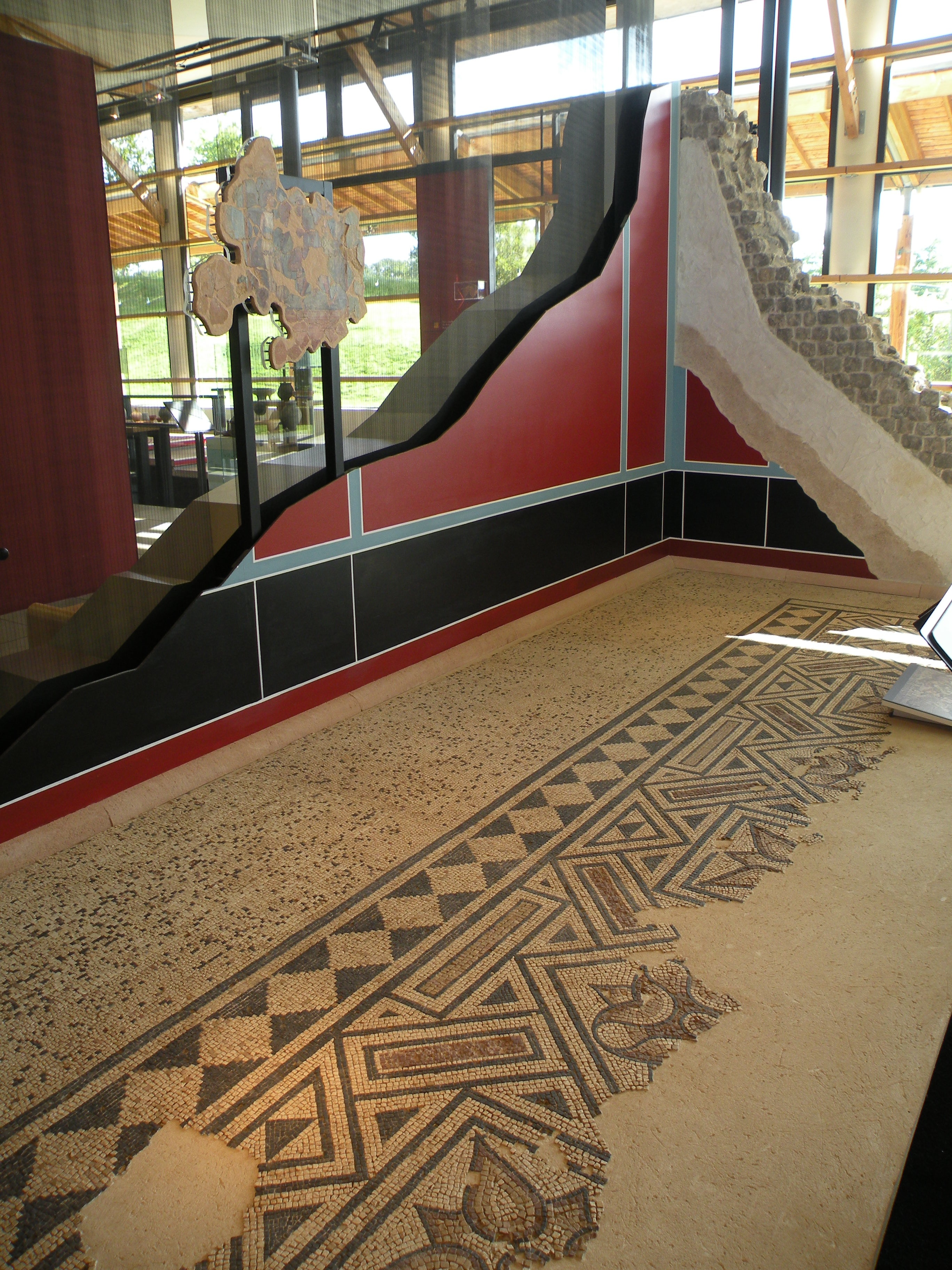
Mosaic and reconstruction of wall decorations

One mosaic was severely damaged during the construction of the house, with the original dimensions reduced to approximately 12 m^{2}. Its geometric design incorporated oblique bands, square-on and diamond-shaped squares with floral motifs, and a four-petaled rosette in some instances, while others featured a bulbous cross. This composition aligns with the style observed in Upper Germany and is dated to the Severan dynasty.

A further room in the southern part of the building, which had a hypocaust, revealed fragments of a mosaic with a common Vienna motif that could be partially reconstructed. The background had honeycomb and hexagonal patterns of varying sizes. Archaeologists also discovered glass paste tesserae and fragments of "figured motifs" that filled the hexagons.

Two mosaic fragments that succeeded this work were discovered during the nineteenth-century excavations and are currently housed at the Normandy Museum. Additional tesserae unearthed in 1990 are believed to date to the House with the checkerboard mosaic.

==== Architectural decor ====
The reception hall, courtyard, and garden were lavishly embellished, and all sculptures were crafted from Caen stone. (Note: Rioult & Vipard 1999, p. 192)

===== Columns of the facade gallery =====
The columns of the facade gallery exhibited smooth surfaces and Attic bases, with dimensions that fluctuated in accordance with the topographical incline. The gallery provided structural support for an upper floor and is presumed to have been erected during the period of the House with the small peristyle.

The house's entrance had twin columns.

===== Pillars =====
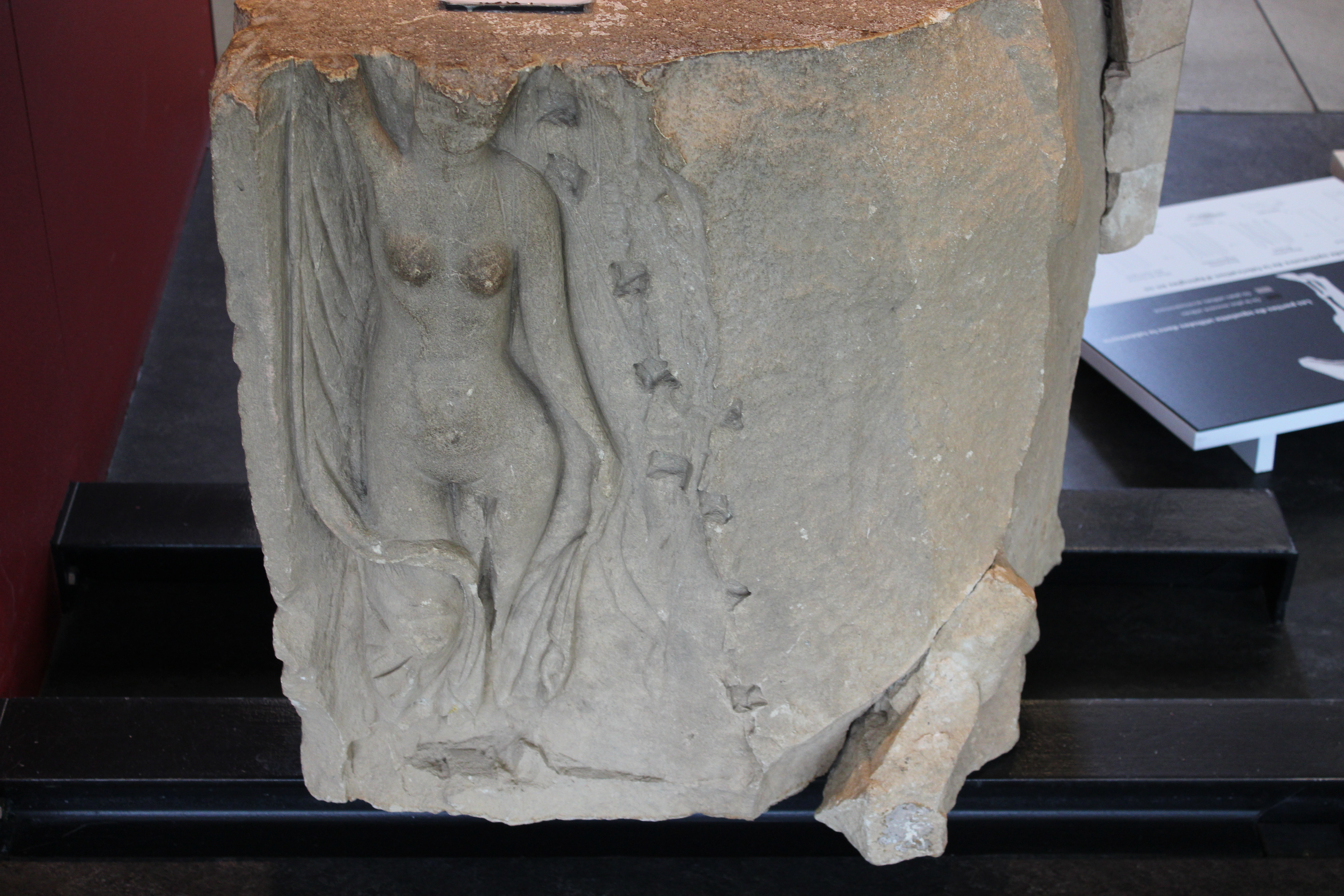
East face of the southeast pillar: Venus anadyomene relief in the Musée de Vieux

The entrance to the house was embellished with partially preserved pillar decorations dating from the edifice's apogee.

The portico, estimated to be 4.50 meters in height, featured bas-relief decoration on two of its faces; however, the fragments discovered do not permit the reconstruction of the structure. The pillars were adorned with approximately fifty scenes, which were likely associated with mythology and imperial ideology. However, the surviving remains do not substantiate this hypothesis. The excavations yielded only a few clues that allow for speculation about the depicted scenes. The discovered fragments included one depicting a flower and opposing griffins, which have been identified as attributes of Apollo and Dionysus and "domestic guardians," as well as deities of uncertain identity (believed to be Apollo or Diana). Additionally, there were depictions of Marsyas and a putto. It is also possible that the owners were represented on the pillars. A Venus Anadyomene was identified on a 600-kilogram block, while a figure to her left was extracted with great care and subsequently disappeared.

===== Courtyard and garden =====
====== Peristyle columns ======
The excavations revealed a wealth of exceptional decorative elements, including columns engraved with vegetal motifs, pillars adorned with bas-reliefs, and intricate mosaics. The sculpted pillars of the vestibule exhibit stylistic continuity with the portico columns, which represent the "heart of the domus." The peristyle columns originate from two distinct construction phases: the earliest phase features floral motifs inscribed in diamonds, while the later phase incorporates interlocking columns. Both types of columns are alternately arranged within the structure. The columns adhere to the provincial Tuscan architectural style and measure approximately 2.70 meters in height.

The columns are embellished with motifs that are typically associated with public edifices, according to experts in the field. It is notable that certain motifs, such as engravings and interlocking patterns, appear with particular frequency in this context. The architectural style of the house's columns has been likened to that of the city's baths. Some columns feature a highly prevalent stylized foliage decoration, while others display a diamond pattern with vegetal motifs and acanthus leaves. The latter is particularly scarce, with only four documented instances in Gaul or Germany, dating from the House with the small peristyle. This decorative motif originated in the East and spread to Gaul during the second and third centuries. Its use in domestic architecture is evidenced in Rouen and Bourges, where it was employed to imbue the structures with a more solemn character.

The columns are grooved on the opposite sides, designated as a "portico closure system with wooden panels," which accounts for local climatic constraints and the opening extension during the construction of the House with the Grand Peristyle. This arrangement is also attested in Italy from the mid-first century.

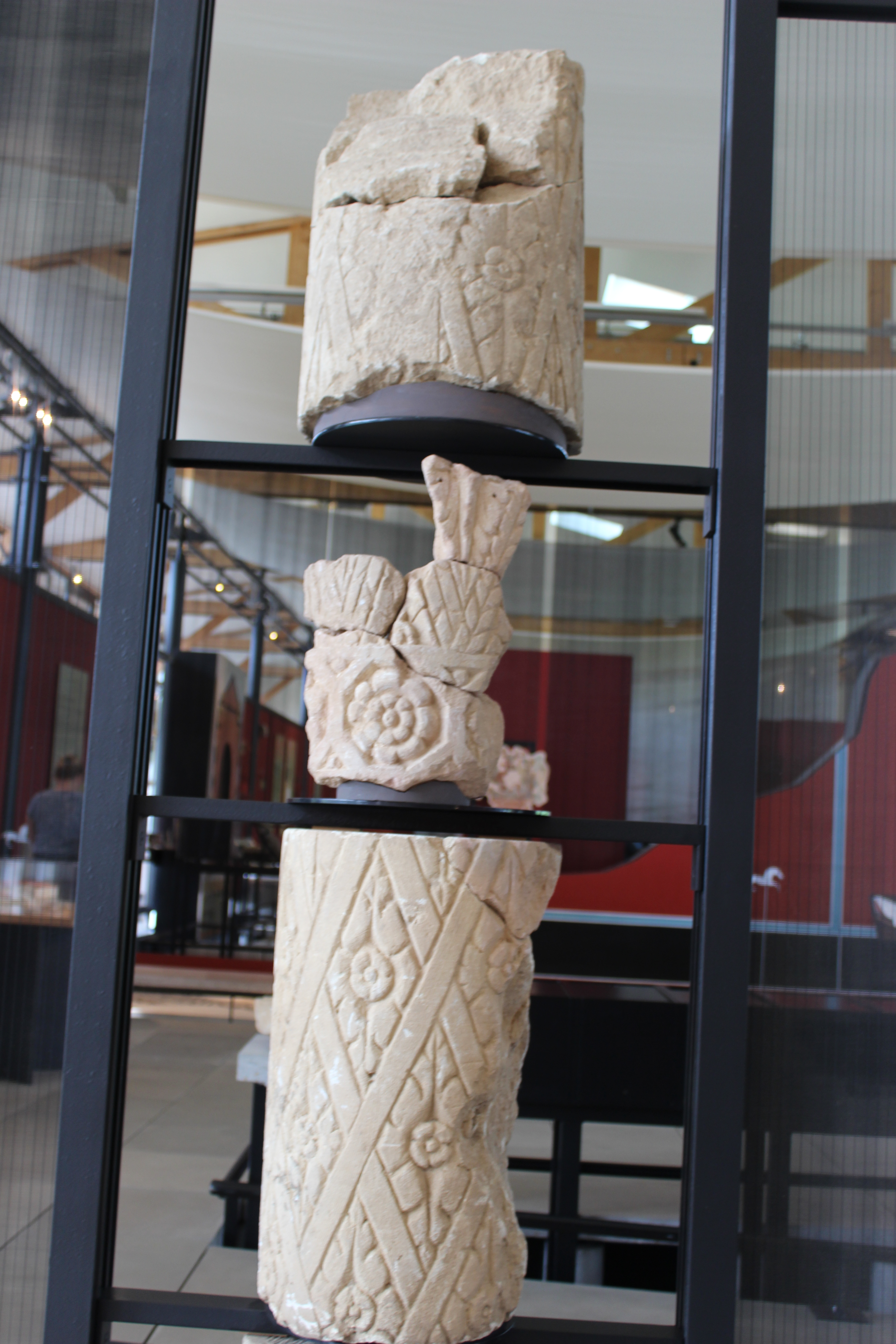
One of the columns of the peristyle with plant decoration in lozenges.

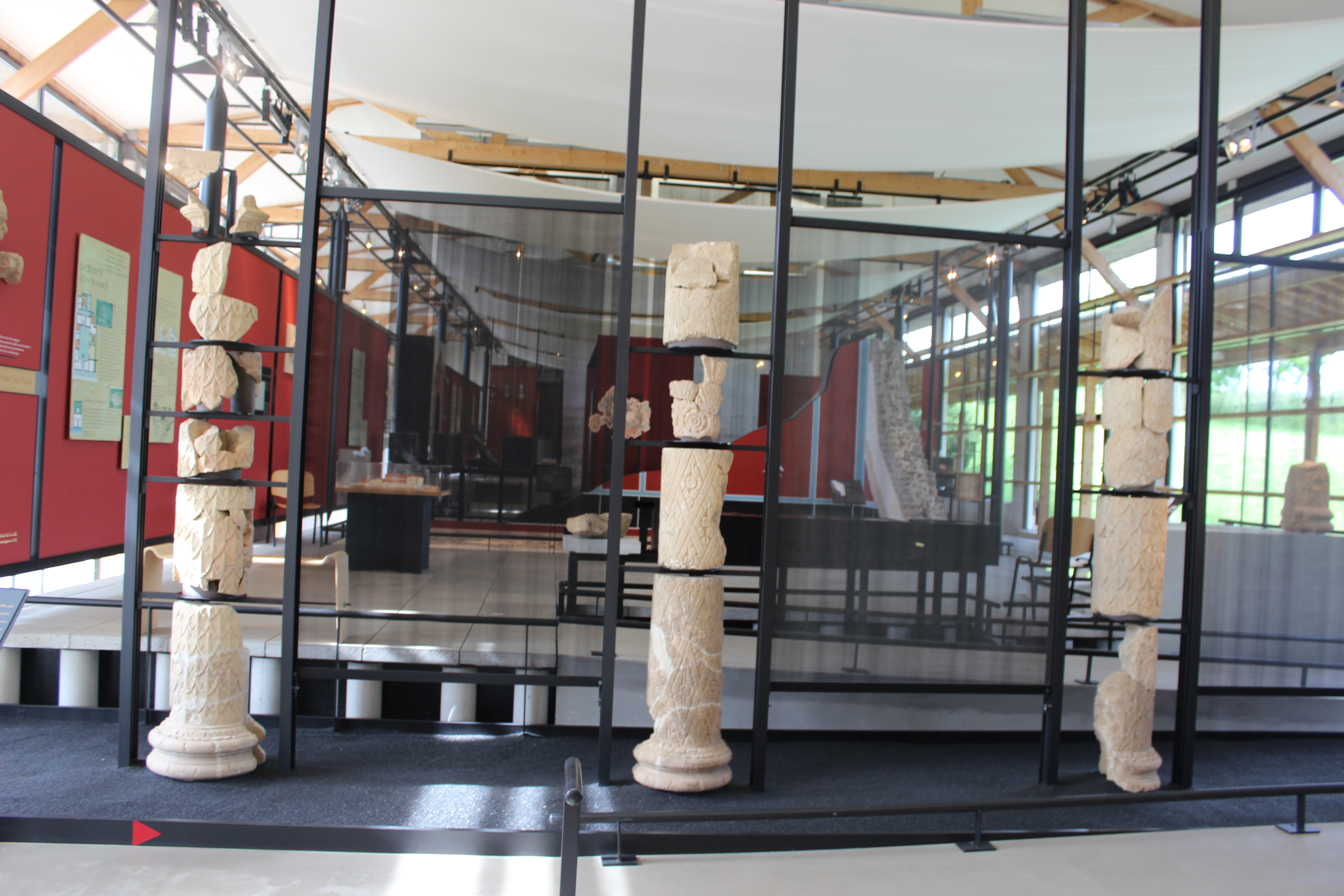
Three peristyle columns.

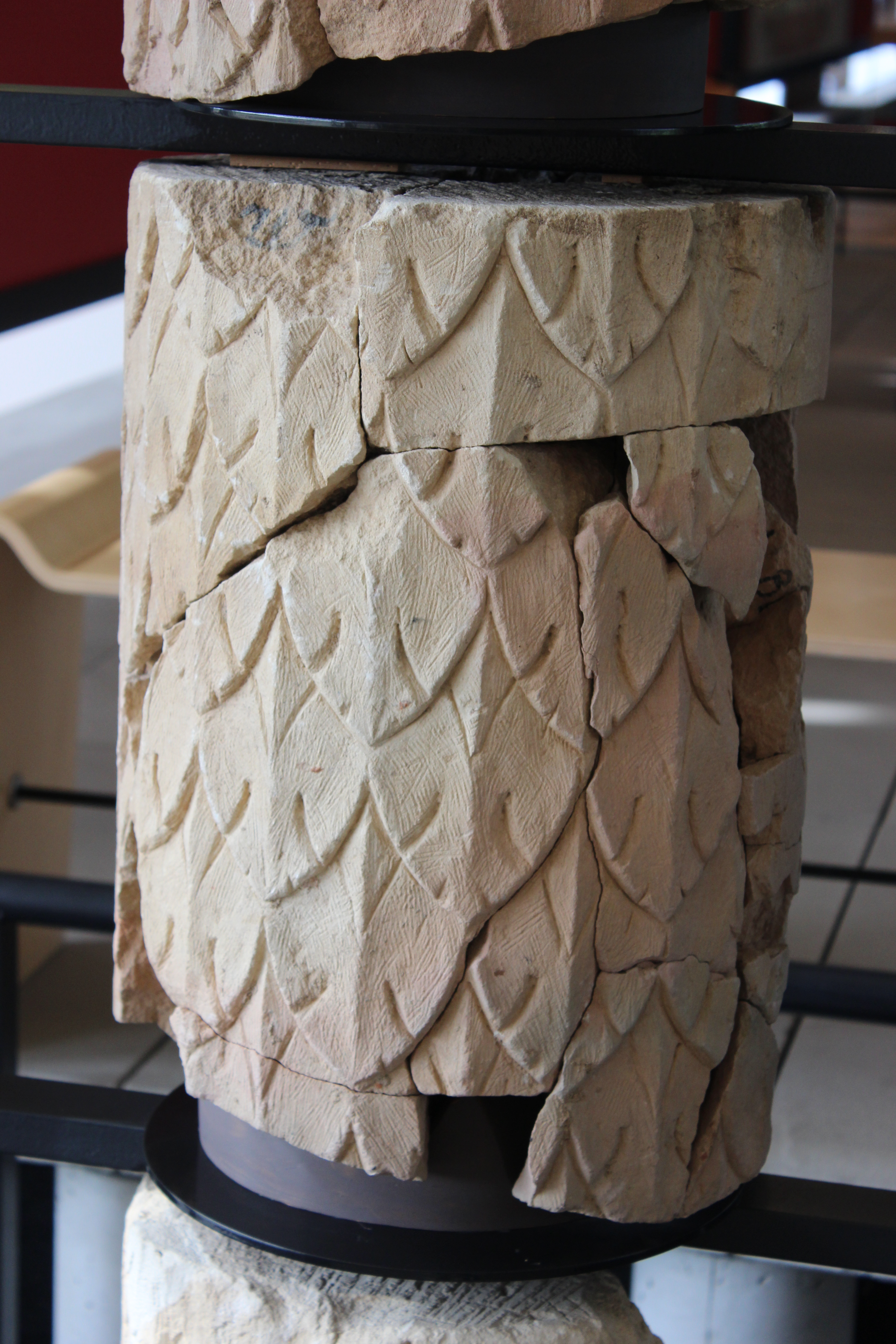
One of the peristyle columns with foliage decoration.

====== Central garden ======
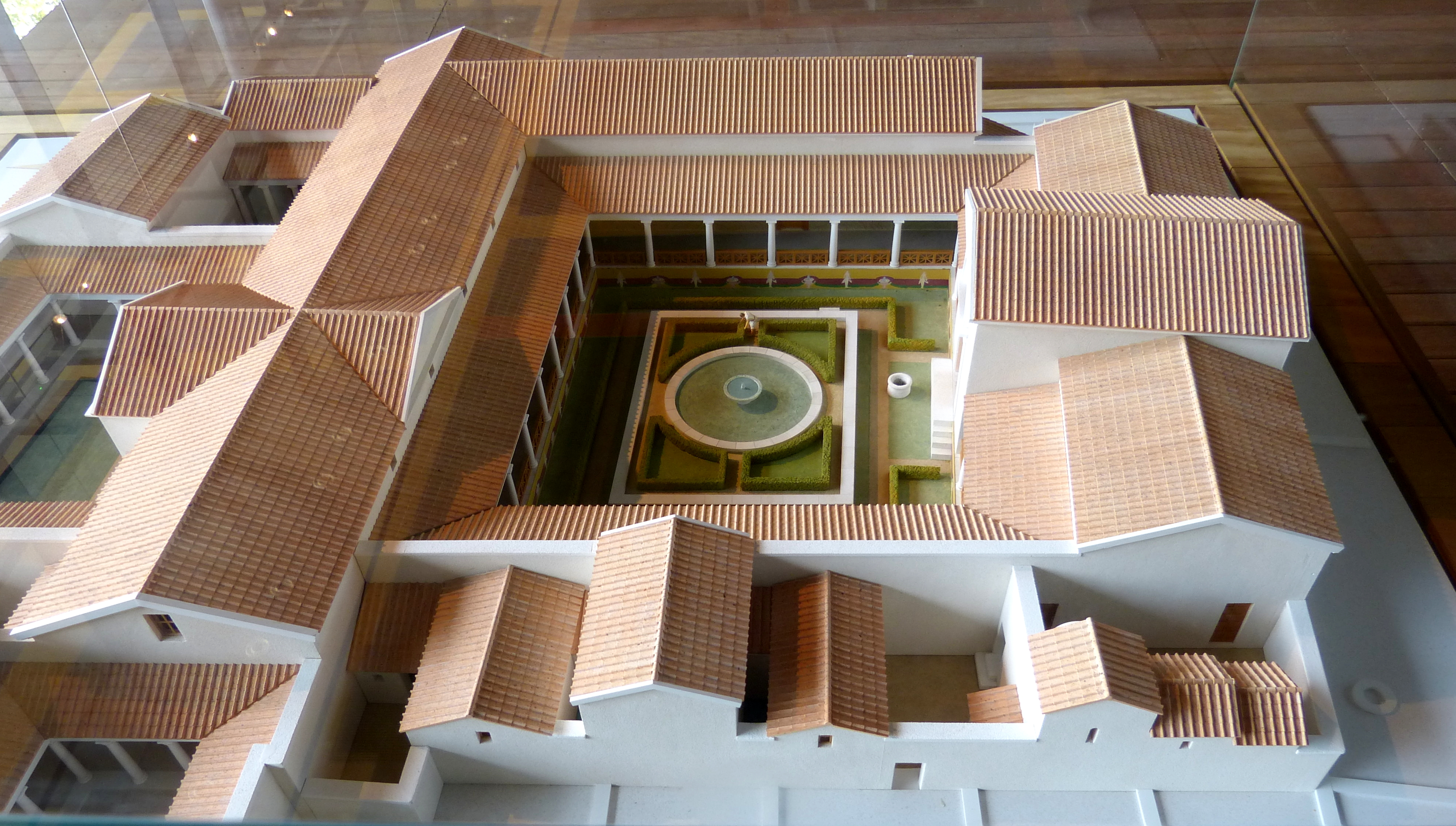
Model of the Bouquets house in Vesunna, present-day Périgueux

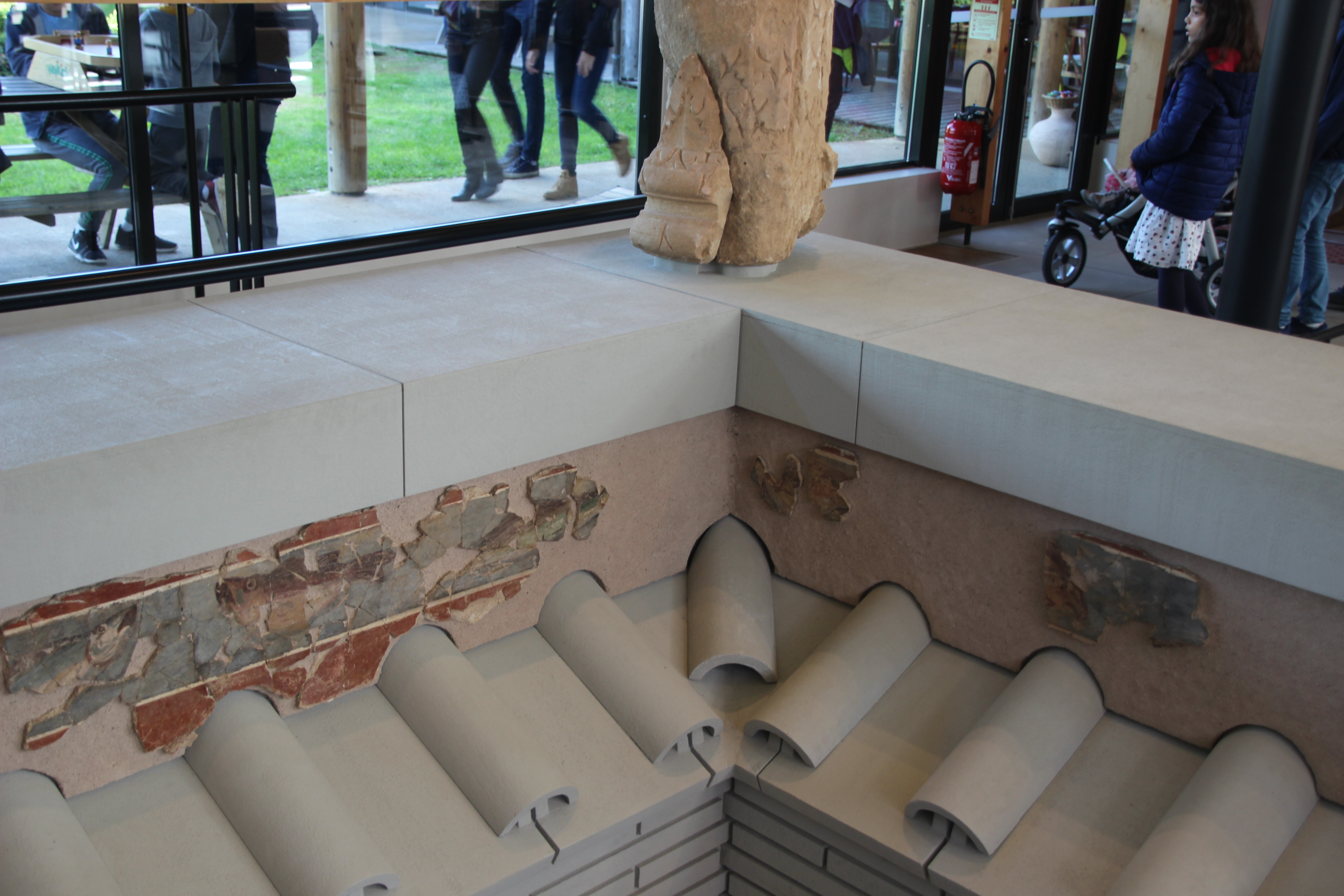
Fresco of the peripheral basin at the Musée archéologique de Vieux-la-Romaine

The excavation did not yield sufficient evidence to identify the plants present in the garden.

A peripheral basin constructed from brick, mortar, and rubble, reminiscent of "late Republican Italic models," was unearthed. It is presumed to have incorporated a system of water jets made of lead pipes. A frieze featuring fish motifs adorns three sides, creating "an illusion of aquatic fauna." Parallels can be drawn with the fish fauna observed in the domus of Bouquets-Vesunna in Périgueux, and an ichthyic fresco was also identified in Lisieux.

A central poly-lobed basin, measuring approximately 2 meters by 3.60 meters, was unearthed and exhibited apses on both the long and short sides. The original height of the structure is unknown. A fountain, likely fed by a conduit placed to the east, was probably located here, following a model known in Pompeian houses (the House of the Great Fountain or that of Meleager). The water supply was located in the northeast. Sculpted fragments of putti and animals may have been connected to the sculpted fountain.

===== Columns of the lararium and the balcony =====
Two pairs of columns were discovered, which the excavators linked to a balcony or gallery on the upper floor. One pair of columns was approximately 3.40 meters high, while the other was approximately 2.40 meters high. The taller columns featured vegetative spirits.

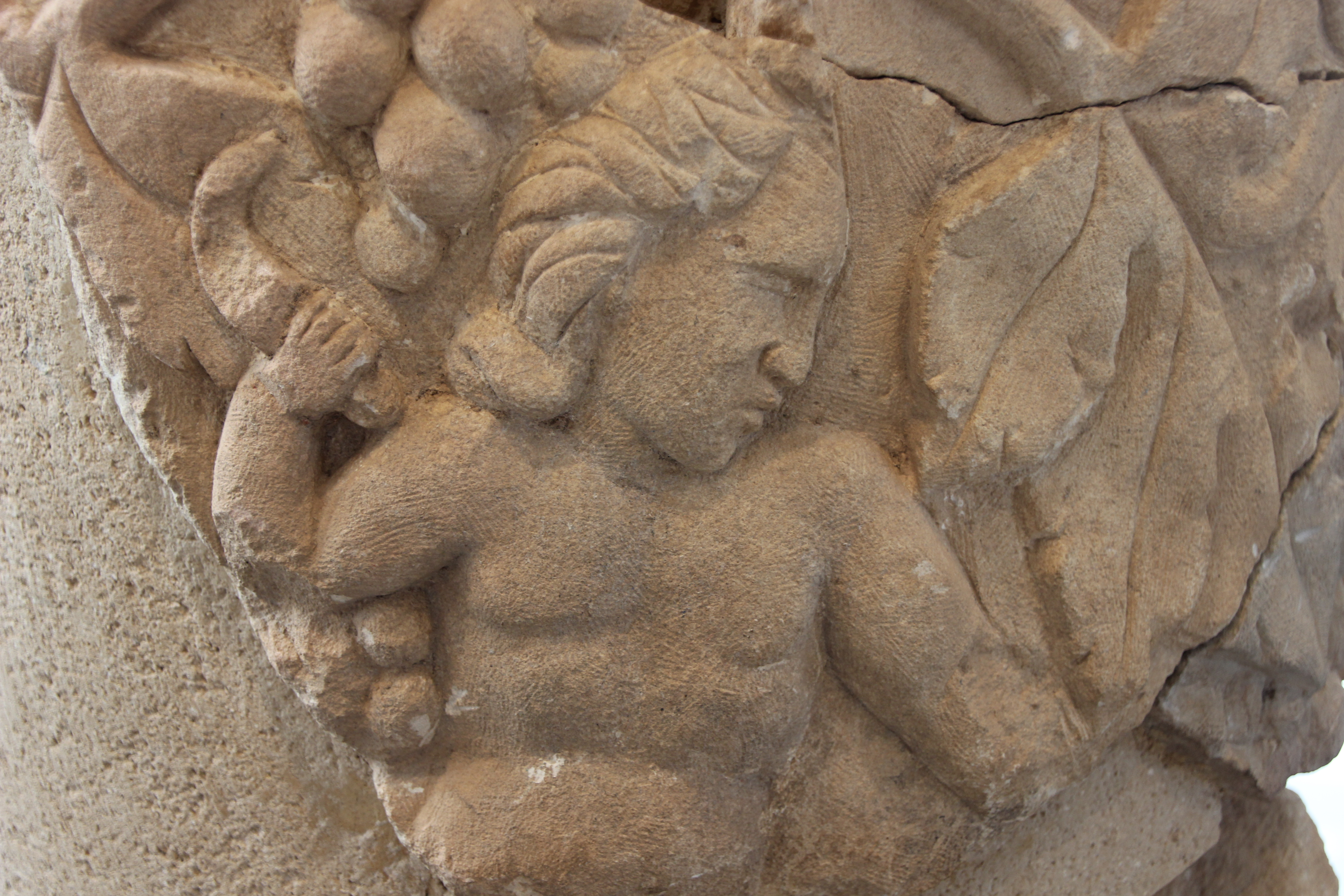
Sculpture of a figure with a winemaker's sickle

The columns are embellished with lavish ornamentation with vine scrolls, animals, and Dionysian figures. These decorations served both an aesthetic purpose and a functional one, as they were also employed in public edifices, temples, and other architectural structures.

One of the columns features a vegetative face with hares and snakes in the hair, set against a background of characters, vine leaves, and grape clusters. Among the figures depicted are a character holding a vine-grower's sickle, a satyr, and Cupid.

The remaining columns, which are of a shorter stature, are of "notably superior quality." They feature two Amazon shields and a vine motif emerging from a kantharos, with characters and birds, as well as three representations of satyrs, one of whom is depicted as Hercules in the garden of the Hesperides, with the serpent Ladon and a vine stem to the right.

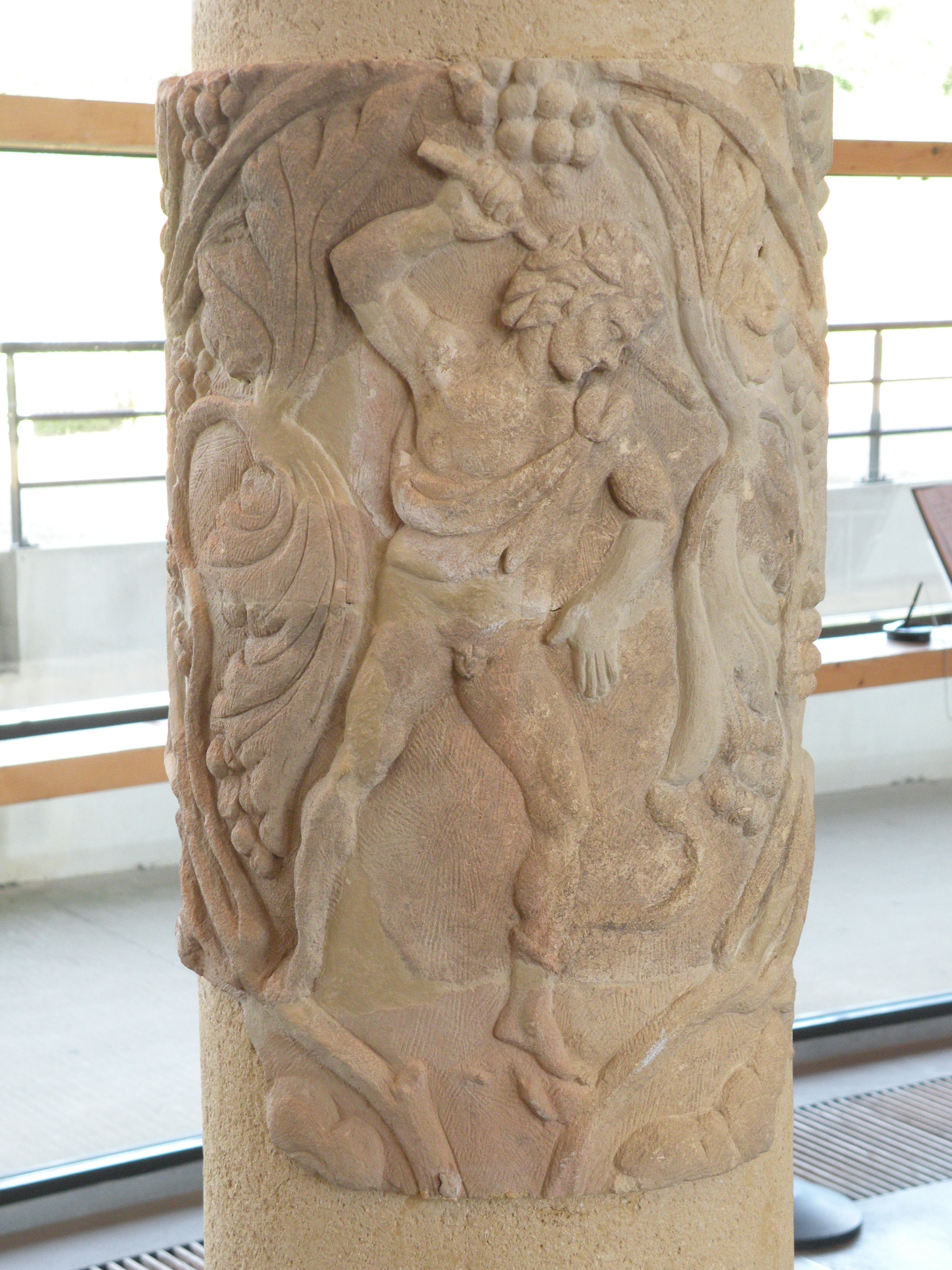
Column depicting Hercules in the Garden of the Hesperides.

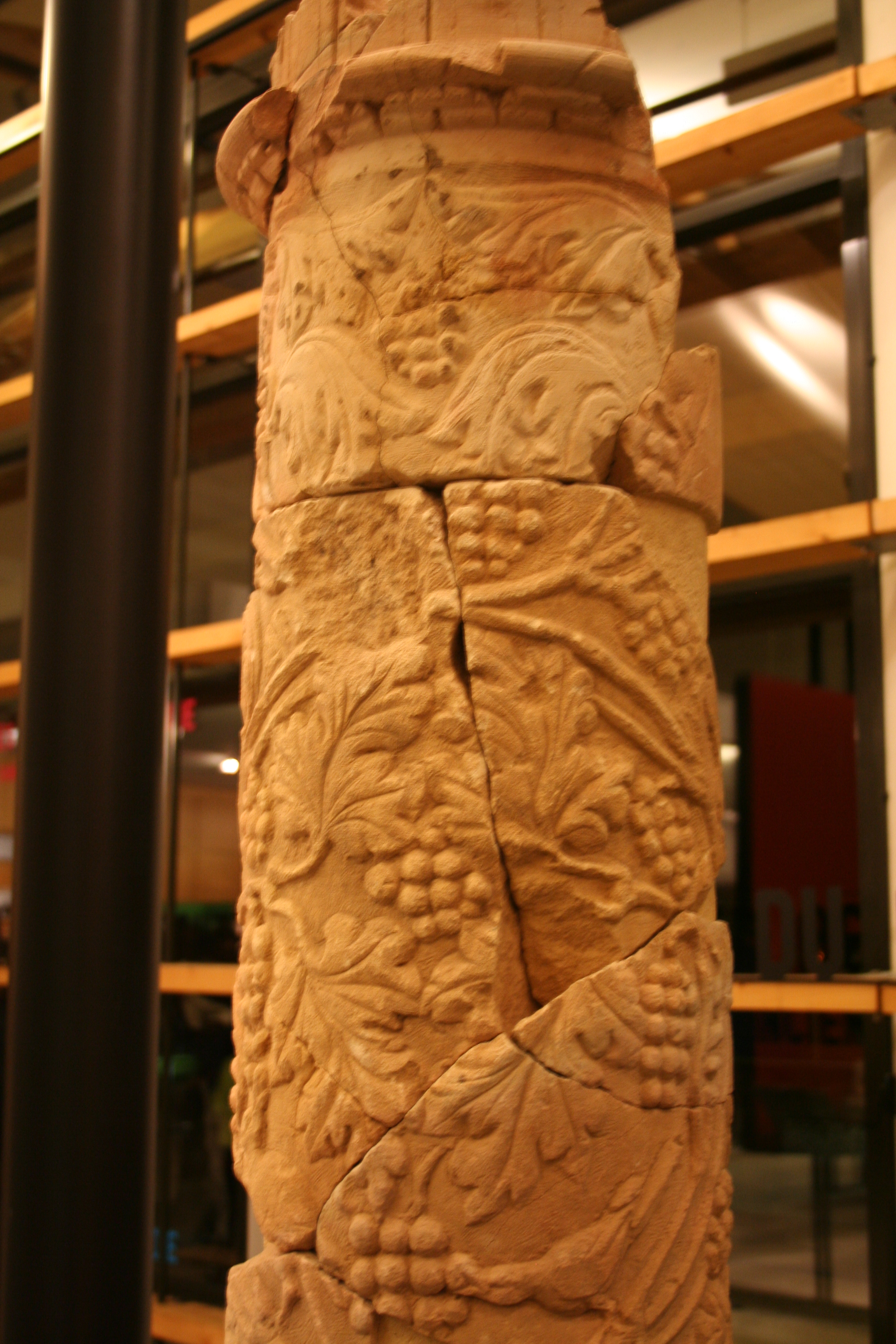
Column with bacchic motifs (vines and grapes), partly reassembled in the Vieux-la-Romaine archaeological museum.

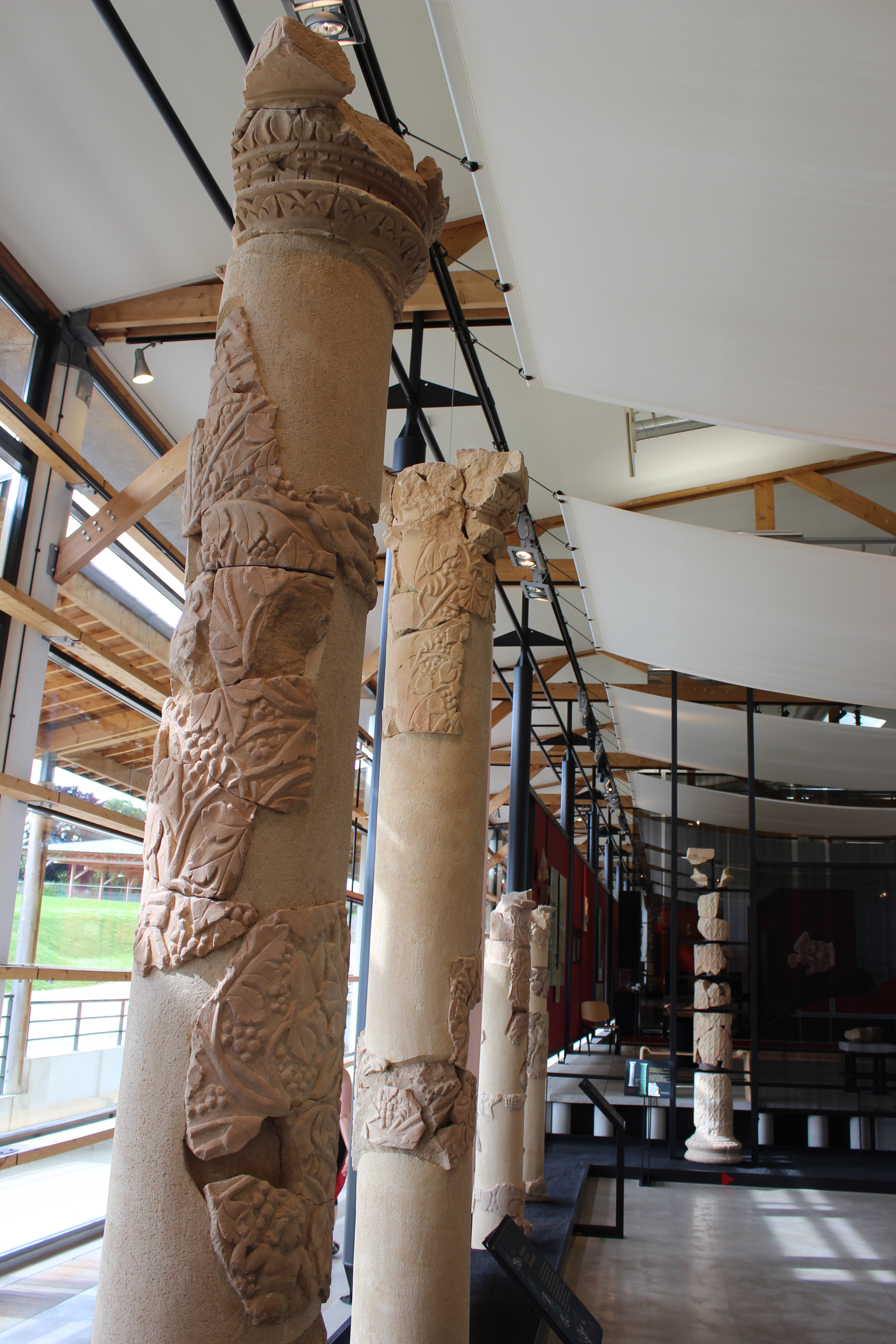
Series of columns with bacchic motifs.

==== Statuary furniture ====
The site has yielded several notable artifacts, including Bacchic reliefs, an exceptional tutelary statue, and a series of more common white terracotta statuettes unearthed during the excavations.

===== Tutela =====
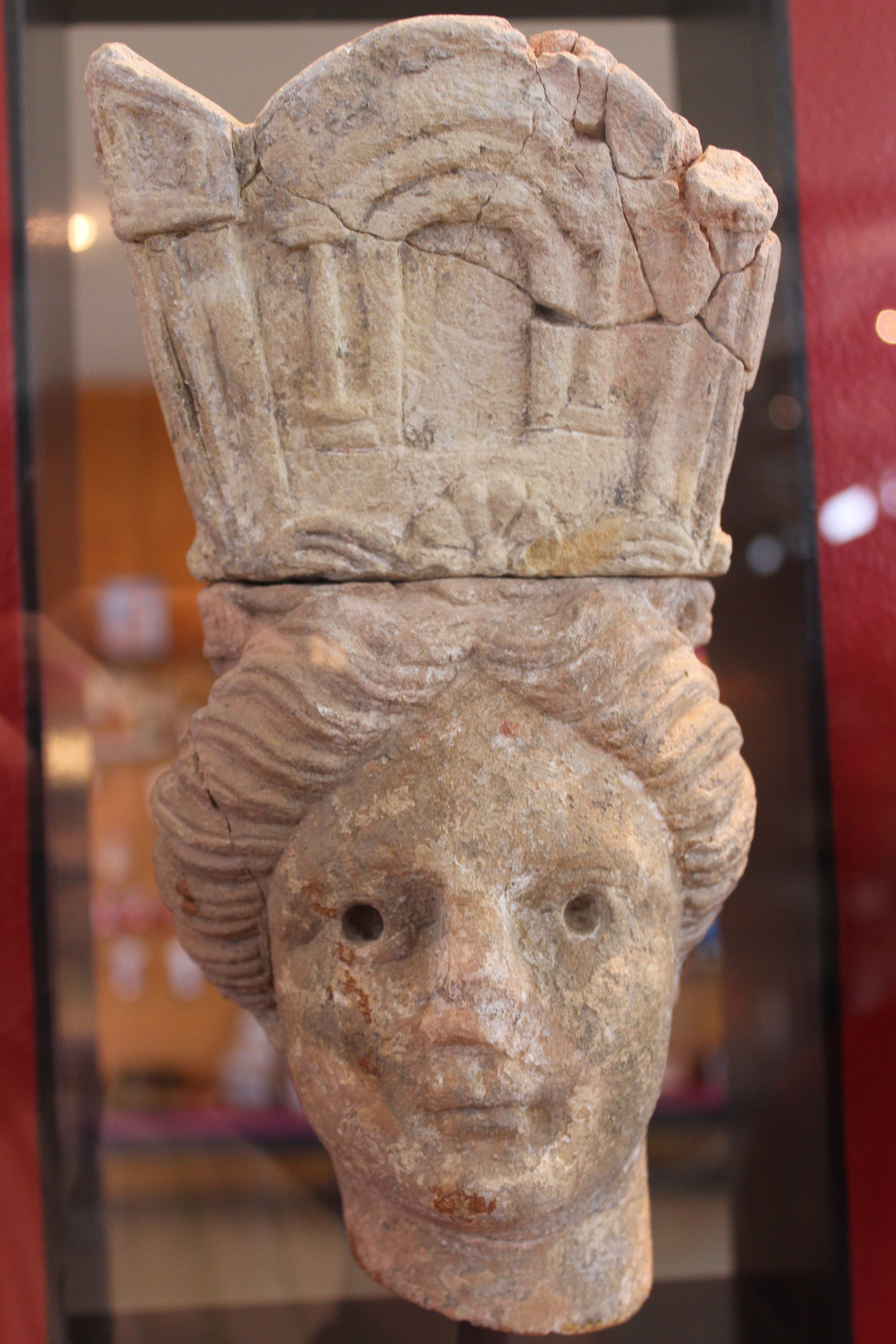
The Tutela of Vieux-la-Romaine, a symbol of the city according to archaeologists, found in the excavations of the residence

The so-called tutela statue was unearthed during the excavation of the reception room situated on the ground floor of the western wing. Six fragments, five of which are identifiable, (Note: Vipard 1990, pp. 251–253) were discovered in a layer corresponding to the fire that destroyed the house at the end of the 3rd century. (Note: Vipard 1990, p. 251) The piece, crafted from local limestone from Caen, (Note: Vipard 1990, pp. 251–255) was approximately 1.10 meters in height and exhibited traces of polychromy on the head. The statue may have been created by the same artists who produced the entry pillars of the house.

The female figure, clothed in a tunic and cloak, grasps a cornucopia in her left hand and a patera in her right. She wears a crown with turrets upon her head, bearing a depiction of a triumphal arch or city gate on the front. Her hairstyle aligns with a style documented during the rule of the Antonines and is discernible on the busts of Faustina the Younger or Bruttia Crispina. (Note: Vipard 1990, p. 253)

Archaeological analysis has identified the statue as representing either Fortuna or Tyche, the genius of the place, or Tutela, the civic deity linked to the imperial cult. The presence of such a representation in the house of a local elite member is deemed to be both natural and plausible, particularly given its location in an official reception room. This implies a public function for the location, thereby substantiating the "officialization of the decor."

===== Other elements =====
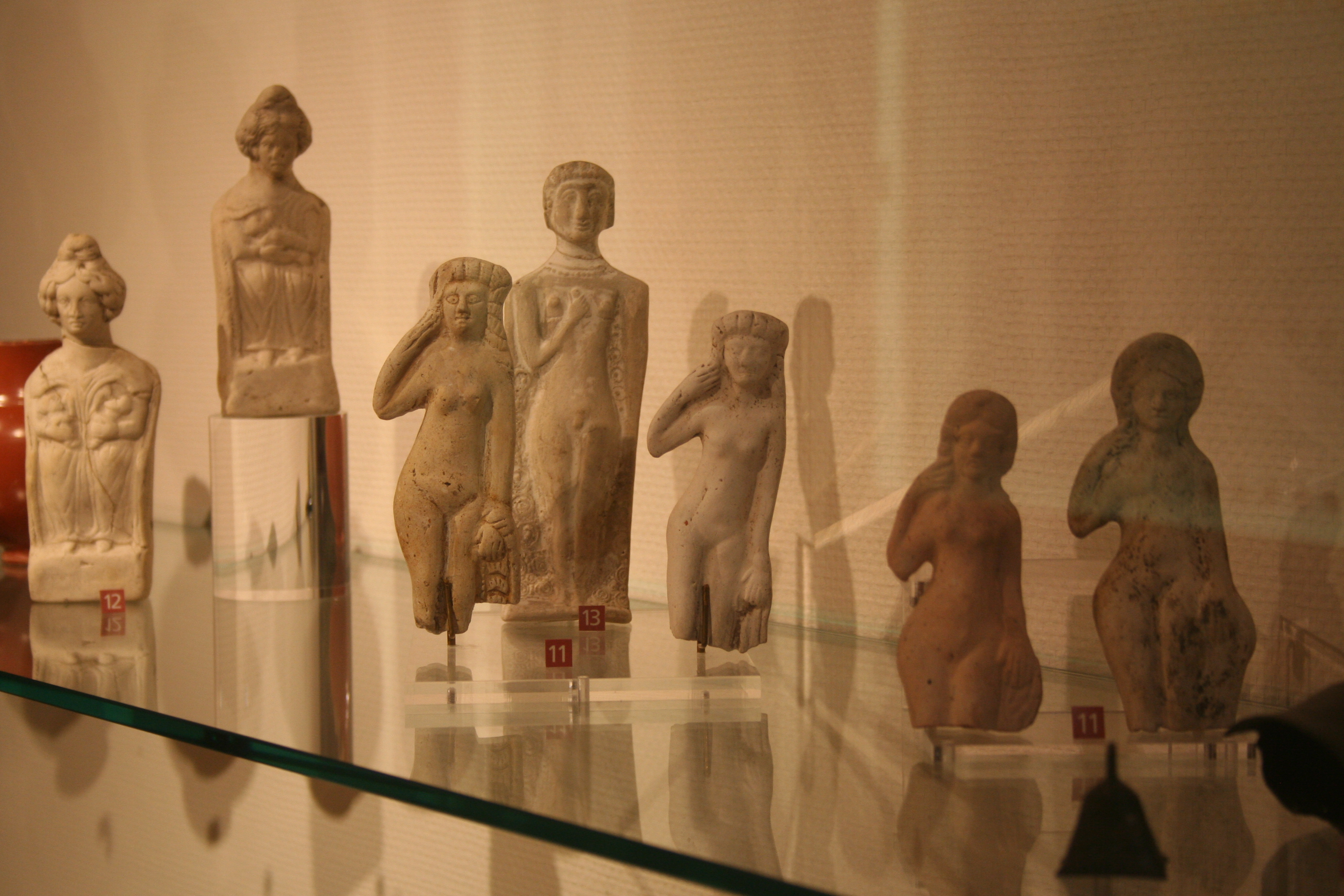
White terracotta statuettes of Venus and Mother Goddesses at the Normandy Museum (illustration)

Archaeological investigations have yielded evidence suggesting the presence of a lararium, a sacred space dedicated to the worship of deities, within the site. The recovered artifacts include terracotta statuettes, a depiction of Venus, and a figure representing a mother goddess.

== Interpretation ==
=== Testimony of the acculturation of local elites ===
==== Testimony of romanization ====
This architectural style, which is not well-suited to certain regions, is rare in this area and linked to the process of Romanization. The house serves as an example of the peristyle type, which was widely used in Gaul. (Note: Vipard et al. 2007, p. 228) Adaptations were made to accommodate (Note: Vipard 1998, p. 108) the specific climatic conditions of the Norman climate. (Note: Rioult & Vipard 1999, pp. 189–190)

The excavations have revealed a typical Mediterranean dwelling, which provides evidence of the assimilation of Roman architectural styles by the northern Gauls and their integration into the upper echelons of Roman society. This process of Romanization resulted in a uniformity of thought and behavior. The dwelling is an indicator of the cultural uniformity that existed at the end of the Antonine period, as well as the brief period of apogee that extended to the Severan dynasty. (Note: Vipard 1998, p. 110)

==== Testimony of a fully excavated non-exceptional habitat ====
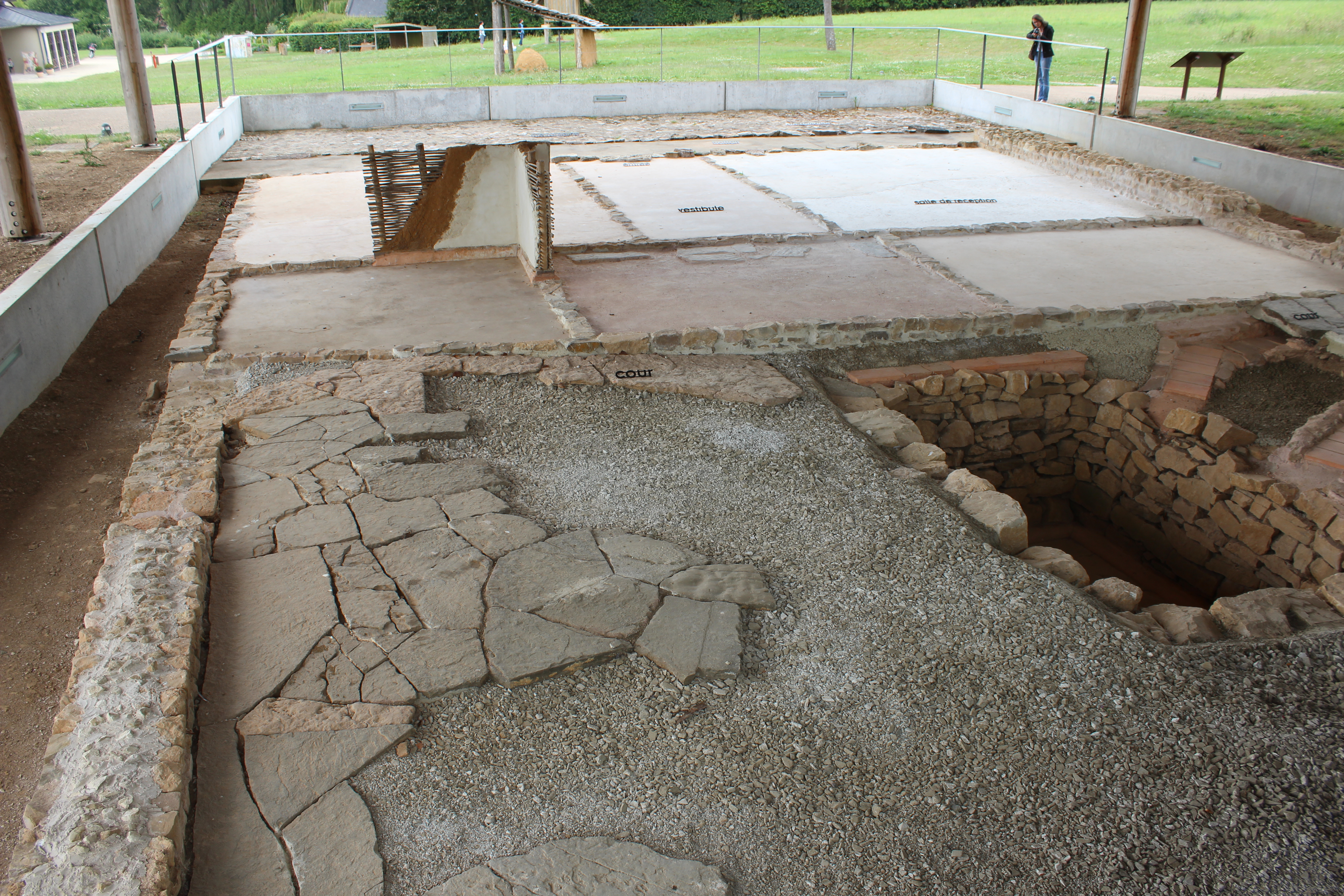
General view of the U-shaped courtyard house, also on the Vieux archaeological site

The building is of a moderate size and architectural style, representative of urban houses in the area. It is similar in design and scale to other dwellings in the region occupied by the local elite. The excavator notes that the building displays a pronounced ostentatious character, typical of large provincial aristocratic dwellings.

The house is not representative of the typical dwellings found on the site, where a more modest architectural style is prevalent. This is exemplified by the U-shaped courtyard house in Vieux-la-Romaine, which was excavated in the 1990s and is situated close to the Vieux-la-Romaine Archaeological Museum.

The domus has been fully excavated, which is exceptional for this type of habitat, especially in northern Gaul. (Note: Vipard 1998, p. 107) The disappearance of the urban character of the site has facilitated the preservation and accessibility of the remains, and the excavation has significantly contributed to the advancement of knowledge regarding the city's history and topography. (Note: Vipard 1998, pp. 110–111)

=== Representation space ===
==== Ostentatious display of the owner's wealth ====
Peristyle houses are primarily situated in the urban cores of cities. This architectural style provides a setting for the lives of the elite, encompassing both otium and negotium. The owner, who occupies "a prominent place in the city," seeks to display ostentation, beginning with the exterior of the house, with the colonnade and entrance arranged like a city gate.

The presence of sculpted decorations, mosaics, marble, and stuccoes, in addition to painted plasters, indicates that the house was constructed with a focus on aesthetic appeal rather than economic efficiency. The decorative style is similar to that seen in Belgic or Lyonnaise Gaul. This richness of decoration may be regarded as a distinctive feature of the Three Gauls, rather than as a universal mode of expression. The identity of the artisans responsible for the decoration remains unknown. However, the analysis of the materials used in the mosaic work has enabled us to determine that they were of Burgundian origin. The stucco reliefs are found in the most important rooms of the house, while some of the less important rooms were decorated to a lesser extent. It is noteworthy that painted plasters with a mythological theme are uncommon in Gaul, and the pigments used in Vieux were expensive.

==== Assertion of a political, cultural, or religious message ====
The house serves to "assert a social status within the private sphere," whereby the owner endeavors to convey to visitors a political, cultural, or religious message.

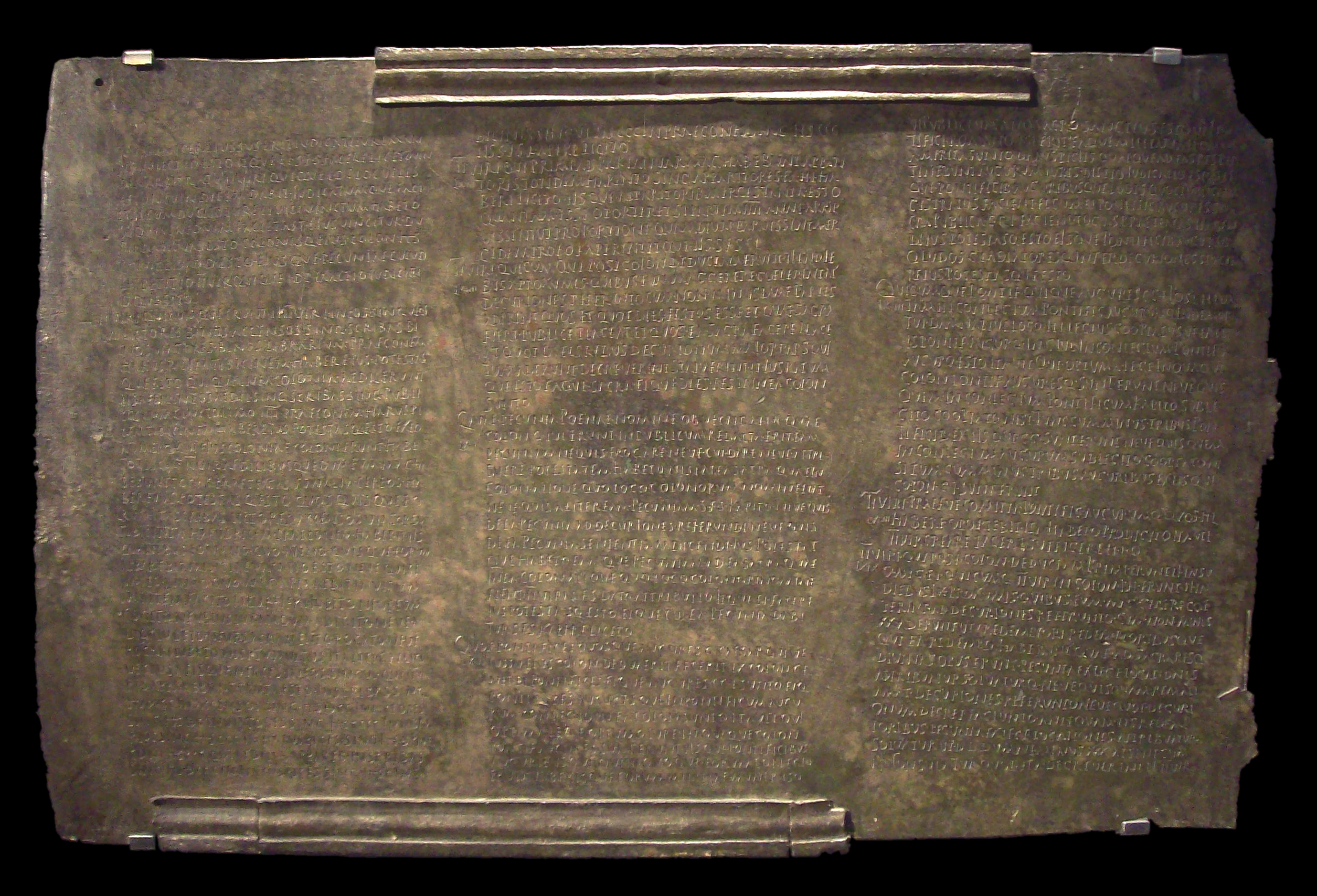
The Lex Ursonensis table at Madrid's National Archaeological Museum

In accordance with the Lex Ursonensis, the decurions were obliged to reside in the capital, regardless of the considerable disparities in wealth that existed within the order. (Note: Vipard et al. 2007, pp. 231–233) The ownership of such a house was regarded as a "manifestation of dignitas," a "conscious form of ostentation," which bestowed access to public functions and generated considerable expenses.

The decorative scheme employed within the domestic setting is not merely an aesthetic consideration; rather, it is intrinsically linked to the expression and exercise of power. Consequently, the aesthetic elements within this context bear a striking resemblance to those observed in public edifices. This aspect is common throughout the Roman Empire, and the use in domestic architecture of official architectural forms or decorations—civil or religious buildings, in public spaces—is a manifestation of "political power." However, the political role of peristyle houses is less well-documented for the Empire than for the late Roman Republic. Nevertheless, the architectural manifestation of power and social rank persists under the Empire, even if the purpose is regional or local power. Consequently, the peristyle house in Vieux had a political purpose, even if it is a late example.

The Dionysian decorations found at the site, situated north of the Loire, are of a high quality, although they remain inferior to those found in Italy. The elaborate decoration of the columns is indicative of a provincial style, with the Bacchic theme primarily serving a symbolic and iconographic function. It seems plausible to suggest that the Dionysian inspiration may be related to a religious or social aspect or both. This is because the Bacchic cult is known as the "religion of the owning class" from the reign of Trajan. Consequently, the theme with its aesthetic appeal enjoys great success in Lyonnaise Gaul. The elements found in Vieux suggest that the site follows "a general trend," and the house presents a decor that is typical of the richest houses.

The building assumes a "grandiose and official character," functioning as "an instrument of power and personal promotion, allowing the display of one's wealth and social and political power." (Note: Vipard 1998, p. 109) The house in Vieux, despite its late dating to the end of the 2nd century, exemplifies the lifestyle of the provincial elites.

== See also ==
- Loupian Roman villa
- Forum of Vieux-la-Romaine
- Tutela de Vieux-la-Romaine
- Archaeological Garden of the Hospital of Lisieux

== Bibliography ==
=== General works or on the future Normandy area ===
- Balmelle, Catherine; Darmon, Jean-Pierre (2017). La mosaïque dans les Gaules romaines (in French). Picard. ISBN 9782708410312.
- Groud-Coudray, Claude (2007). La Normandie gallo-romaine (in French). OREP éditions. ISBN 9782915762181.
- Deniaux, Élisabeth (2002). "La conquête et l'intégration à l'Empire romain". La Normandie avant les Normands (in French). Rennes: Ouest-France. ISBN 9782737311178.
- Vipard, Pascal; Fauduet, Isabelle; Graham, Brian; Odenhardt-Donvez, Isa (2007). "Maison à péristyle et élites urbaines en Gaule sous l'Empire". Gallia (in French). 64 (64): 227–277. doi:10.3406/galia.2007.3312. Archived from the original on August 8, 2024.
- Barbet, Alix (2012). "A la recherche de l'architecture et de son décor en Gaule romaine". Revue archéologique (in French). 2 (54): 297–312. doi:10.3917/arch.122.0297. Archived from the original on August 8, 2024.
- Blanchet, Guillaume (2016). "Vie et survie du petit numéraire dans le nord de la Gaule : l'exemple des découvertes de la domus au Grand péristyle de Vieux-la-romaine (Calvados)". Produktion und Recyceln von Münzen in der Spätantike / Produire et recycler la monnaie au Bas-Empire, 29, Verlag des Römisch-Germanischen Zentralmuseums (in French). RGZM-Tagungen. pp. 83–96. ISBN 9783884672709. Archived from the original on August 8, 2024.

=== Work on the city of Vieux or the house with the grand peristyle ===
- Boislève, Julien (2011). "La Maison au Grand Péristyle à Aregenua (Vieux -Calvados), une relecture du programme décoratif peint et stuqué". Décor des édifices publics civils et religieux en Gaule durant l'antiquité, Ier-IVe siècle : peinture, mosaïque, stuc et décor architectonique, Actes du colloque de Caen, 7–8 avril 2011 (in French). Chauvigny-Caen. pp. 135–154. Archived from the original on August 8, 2024.
- Vipard, Pascal (2004). La cité d'Aregenua (Vieux, Calvados); chef-lieu des Viducasses. état des connaissances (in French). Château-Gonthier. ISBN 9782913993051.
- Vipard, Pascal (1998). La maison du "Bas de Vieux" une riche habitation romaine du quartier des thermes d'Aregenua (Vieux, Calvados) (in French). Caen. ISBN 2950649610.
- Vipard, Pascal (2001). "Le rôle du décor dans les parties officielles d'une domus à péristyle du début du IIIe siècle : le cas de la Maison au Grand Péristyle (Vieux, Calvados)". Revue du Nord (in French). 5 (343): 21–33. doi:10.3917/rdn.343.0021. Archived from the original on August 8, 2024.
- Vipard, Pascal (1990). "Une statue récemment découverte à Vieux (Calvados)". Gallia (in French). 47: 251–255. doi:10.3406/galia.1990.2910. Archived from the original on February 19, 2020.
- Rioult, Michel; Vipard, Pascal (1999). "L'use de la pierre dans la demeure gallo-romaine de Vieux". L'exploitation ancienne des roches dans le Calvados : histoire et archéologie (in French). Caen. pp. 188–203. Archived from the original on August 8, 2024.
- Delaval, Éric (2004). "Vieux / Aregenua (Calvados)". Supplément à la Revue archéologique du centre de la France (in French) (25): 497–500. Archived from the original on April 24, 2024.
