= Marble of Thorigny =

Sandstone statue discovered in Normany, France

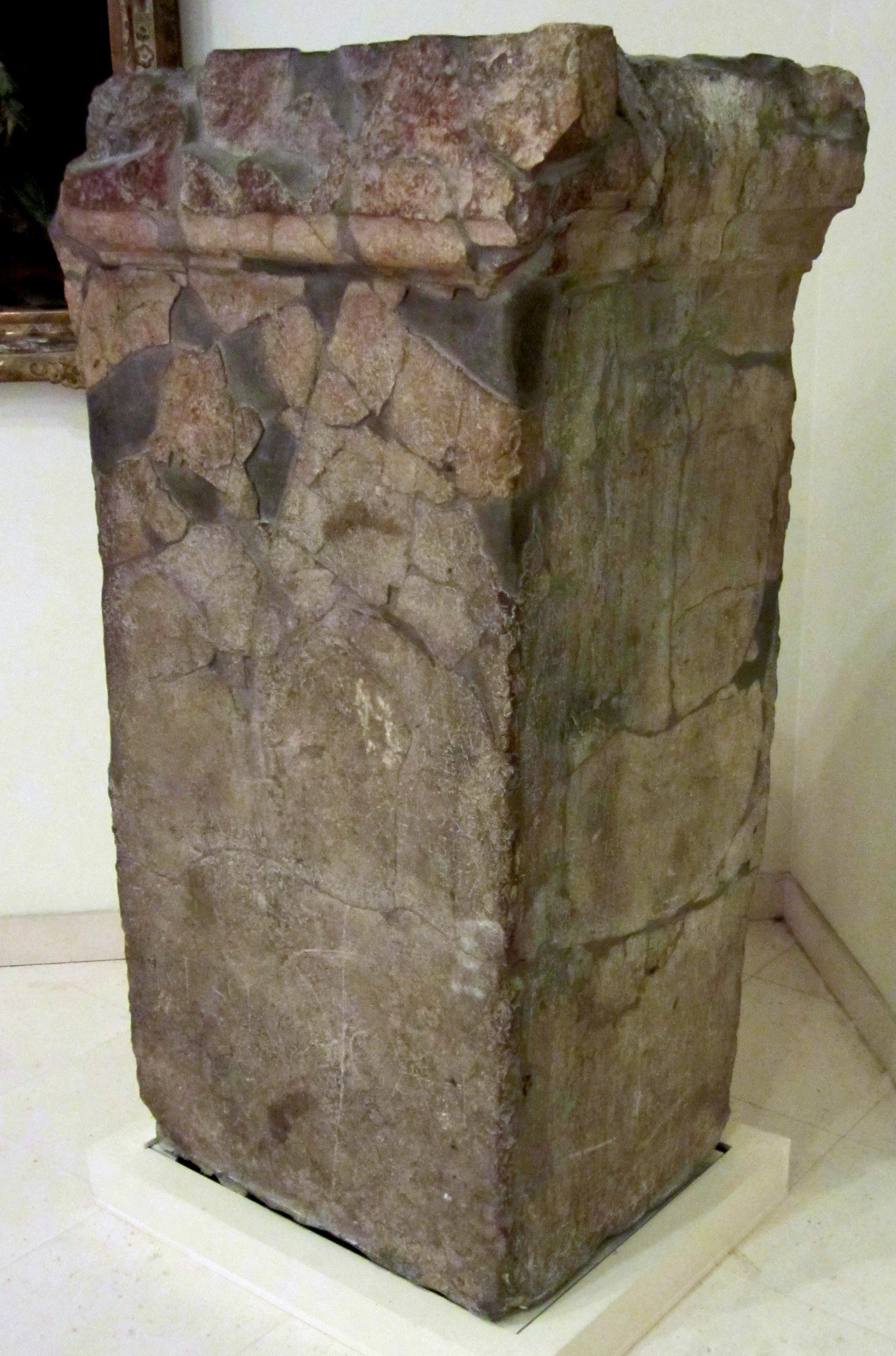
- Year: 238
- Dimensions: 146 × 85 cm
- Designation: French object classified as a historic monument (1922)
- Location: Museum of Art and History, Saint-Lô, France

The Marble of Thorigny is the base of a sandstone statue (not marble) discovered in Vieux (not in Thorigny), located in the Calvados department of Normandy. The inscriptions carved on it describe the political career of a high-ranking Gallo-Roman figure, Titus Sennius Sollemnis, "one of the few notable individuals known in the Armorican part of Gallia Lugdunensis," according to Pascal Vipard. The decision to erect the monument was made by the members of the Council of the Gauls in Lugdunum. The inscriptions on the marble represent "the most extensive text the Council ever had engraved for one of its members." (Note: Vipard 2008, p. 132)

This stone, said by an unreliable tradition to have been discovered in 1580, but more plausibly found in the 17th century, is the most important epigraphic document from Normandy. The monument, transported to the present-day Manche department, was kept at the Château des Matignon, then moved to Saint-Lô, where it was severely damaged during the bombings that destroyed the town in 1944. Transferred to the University of Caen in the 1950s, it returned to Saint-Lô at the end of the 1980s.

Henri Van Effenterre described it as "one of the most beautiful and curious inscriptions of Roman Gaul." The monument's fame is due to the work of Hans-Georg Pflaum in the mid-20th century, following many earlier studies, particularly since the 19th century. The exceptional nature of the Marble of Thorigny provides insight into the life of elites in Gaul during the Roman Empire, from legal and social perspectives, as well as the troubled political circumstances of the 3rd century.

Reproduced by casting several times throughout its history, the original pedestal has been classified as a historic object since June 6, 1922.

== History ==
=== Ancient history ===
==== History of Aregenua from its origins to the 5th century ====
Simplified map of Aregenua.

The current commune of Vieux lies about 10 km southwest of Caen, 20 km from the English Channel, and within the watershed of a stream, the Juine. (Note: Bertin 1977, p. 131)

The city of Aregenua, capital of the Viducasses tribe, was founded in the 1st century and peaked in the 2nd and 3rd centuries under the Severan dynasty, making it contemporaneous with the Marble of Thorigny. (Note: Vipard 2008, p. 146) The city received the status of Latin Rights late—this constitutes a kind of "legal Romanization." (Note: Vipard 2008, p. 148) Romanization ended in the 3rd century. (Note: Bertin 1977, p. 132) The Viducasses are mentioned by Pliny the Elder, and the city is first named in Greek by Ptolemy; the Latin mention is no earlier than the Peutinger Table. (Note: Vipard 2008, p. 140)

The city's baths were built through the benefaction of Titus Sennius Sollemnis's father, probably between 200 and 220 AD. (Note: Vipard 2008, p. 122) Sollemnis's father left the building unfinished. (Note: Vipard 2008, pp. 123–124) These baths were found in the area known as "Champ des Crêtes," and display architectural features comparable to those uncovered in the excavation of the house with a large peristyle. (Note: Vipard 2008, p. 124)

During the crises that afflicted the Roman Empire in the 3rd century, the city was affected, but unlike other nearby cities such as Lisieux, Bayeux, or Évreux, it was not given defensive walls. While the site continued to be inhabited, it lost importance to Bayeux, which became the seat of a bishopric. By the late 3rd and early 4th centuries, the city's decline became even more pronounced. It merged with Bayeux in the early 4th century and disappeared administratively before 400. A large part of the population left the site at that time.

==== Titus Sennius Sollemnis, a notable of the Viducasses ====
General plan of the forum of Aregenua at the end of the 2nd century.

The Marble of Thorigny stood in the forum of Vieux during antiquity.

Titus Sennius Sollemnis, "the most famous of the Viducasses," was likely born around 170 AD during the reign of Marcus Aurelius. (Note: Vipard 2008, p. 121) He came from a wealthy family that played an important role in their city and perhaps in all of Gaul, at least in the case of the last known member, the subject of the inscription. (Note: Vipard 2008, p. 126) He is "the last known representative" of his family.

His father, Sollemninus, commissioned the construction of the city's southern baths, and his generosity extended to providing a sum for their maintenance. His career unfolded under the later Antonines and the Severans. (Note: Vipard 2008, p. 147) He could not complete the thermal complex during his lifetime, and his son had to finish it. Furthermore, a foundation was established to provide income for the structure's operation.

The territory of the Viducasses was wealthy in iron mines, (Note: Vipard 2008, p. 128) and some forty villas have been identified in the Caen plain using aerial photography. The wealth of the Sennii family likely came from the exploitation of these estates and perhaps from the iron mines. (Note: Vipard 2008, pp. 127–128) A property at Touffréville, the villa of La Saussaye, is known to have included both an agricultural operation and an iron mining site with a forge. (Note: Vipard 2008, pp. 130–131) The site of the baths in Vieux yielded an altar to Vulcan dating to the late 2nd or early 3rd century, (Note: Vipard 2008, pp. 131–132) associated with ironwork and blacksmithing.

==== Summary of the career of Titus Sennius Sollemnis ====
Titus Sennius Sollemnis began his career at the end of the 2nd century or the beginning of the 3rd century. He may have become duumvir for the first time at age 28, as it was common to attain this office between the ages of 28 and 31. (Note: Vipard 2008, pp. 121–122) His local magistracy likely occurred during the Severan dynasty.

He was part of the delegation of notables that Gallic cities sent annually to Lugdunum, the provincial capital, to celebrate the imperial cult. Delegates from the various cities chose him as high priest of Rome and Augustus in 220 AD. Pascal Vipard, for his part, prefers the date 219.

He presided over the Council of the Gauls in 219. Sollemnis was a federal priest at Condate and flamen in 219–220, around 50, assuming his career followed a standard pace. He then served under the governor Tiberius Claudius Paulinus. Paulinus was accused after he left the province of Lugdunensis, and when he arrived in Britannia Inferior, possibly in July–August 219. Marcus Aedinius Julianus then arrived in Lugdunensis. (Note: Vipard 2008, p. 119) Julianus belonged to the equestrian order. The accusation against Paulinus came up at the first meeting following the governor's departure, around August 1, 220. Sollemnis then stated that the accusing delegates had no mandate from their cities for such action. He declared that his city had asked for praise for the governor, and Paulinus's enemies were thereby thwarted. The end of the letter is not reproduced on the face of the inscription, likely because it contained formal thanks and held no interest for the political context.

Sollemnis traveled extensively due to patronage ties: he is said to have been in Rome in 223. His presence in Africa to assist the military tribune of the Legio III Augusta is mentioned in the inscription, but cannot be dated. He went to Lower Britain, where Tiberius Claudius Paulinus was governor and commander of the Legio VI Victrix, (Note: Vipard 2008, p. 117) founded by Septimius Severus in 197. The separation of Britain into different provinces was intended by the emperor to limit the risk of revolts by governors. Sollemnis likely departed for Britain in the second half of the year 220 (Note: Vipard 2008, p. 120) to perform the functions of assessor or tribunus sexmenstris. He also went to Africa, possibly between 223 and 238, as assessor to the legion's legate in Lambaesis. These missions took place during the reigns of Alexander Severus and Maximinus.

In 238, he either held or had just finished holding the office of iudex arace ferrariarum, administrator of the Gallic iron mines, for the Three Gauls—a mission whose duration is unknown at the time of the monument's erection. In 238, Sollemnis was nearly 70 years old. On the seventeenth day before the Kalends of January (December 17) in 238, the Council of the Gauls chose to erect a statue in his honor at Aregenua, the city where he was a magistrate, at a location provided by the decuriones. The decision to erect the statue was made in August. (Note: Vipard 2008, p. 138) On three faces of its base were engraved the name of the honored person, his career, and copies of letters sent to him by powerful individuals from the emperor's entourage, likely deceased at the time of the monument's erection, according to Pascal Vipard. (Note: Vipard 2008, p. 134) Hans-Georg Pflaum, on the other hand, believes that Sennius's patrons were still alive and close to Gordian III. The copies of the letters, predating the monument, may have been provided by Titus Sennius Sollemnis himself.

=== Rediscovery and history from the 16th century to World War II ===
Inscriptions found within the area of what would become Normandy are rare. The Thorigny marble is one of fifteen inscriptions recorded by Christian Pilet as discovered at Vieux. According to Henri Van Effenterre, it has known "many misadventures" since its rediscovery.

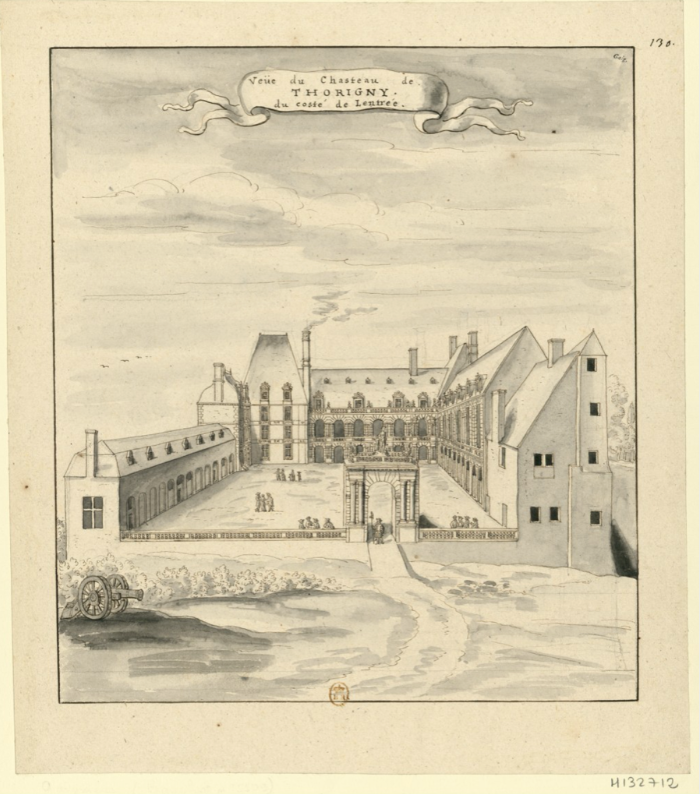
The Matignon Castle at the very end of the 17th century.

The stone, said to have been unearthed in 1580 (Note: Harmand 1965, p. 100) (Note: Bertin 1977, p. 134) according to "poorly supported traditions," was discovered "at an uncertain date" between the 1540s and the 1660s. Maurice Besnier suggests a discovery in 1668. After being lost, it was rediscovered around 1675–1678.

The stone was transported by Jacques de Matignon to his castle in Torigni-sur-Vire, from which it gets its name. The Matignon family was then the governors of Normandy. At the château, the monument was stored in "shacks," then in the orangery, and finally in the vestibule in 1726. During its time at the château, the marble was forgotten and eventually "wrecked by slate cutters." These craftsmen, working outdoors, used the monument in their trade, which nearly erased lines 2 through 14.

From 1814 onward, the stone was kept in Saint-Lô, where it served as the base for the bronze bust of Urbain Le Verrier, (Note: Héron de Villefosse 1889, p. 517) a French astronomer and mathematician specialized in celestial mechanics and the founder of modern French meteorology. In 1814, the owner donated the monument to Pierre Louis Clément, then Secretary-General of the Manche prefecture. He kept it at home before transferring it to the town hall, where it remained for almost a century and a half.

=== Since World War II ===
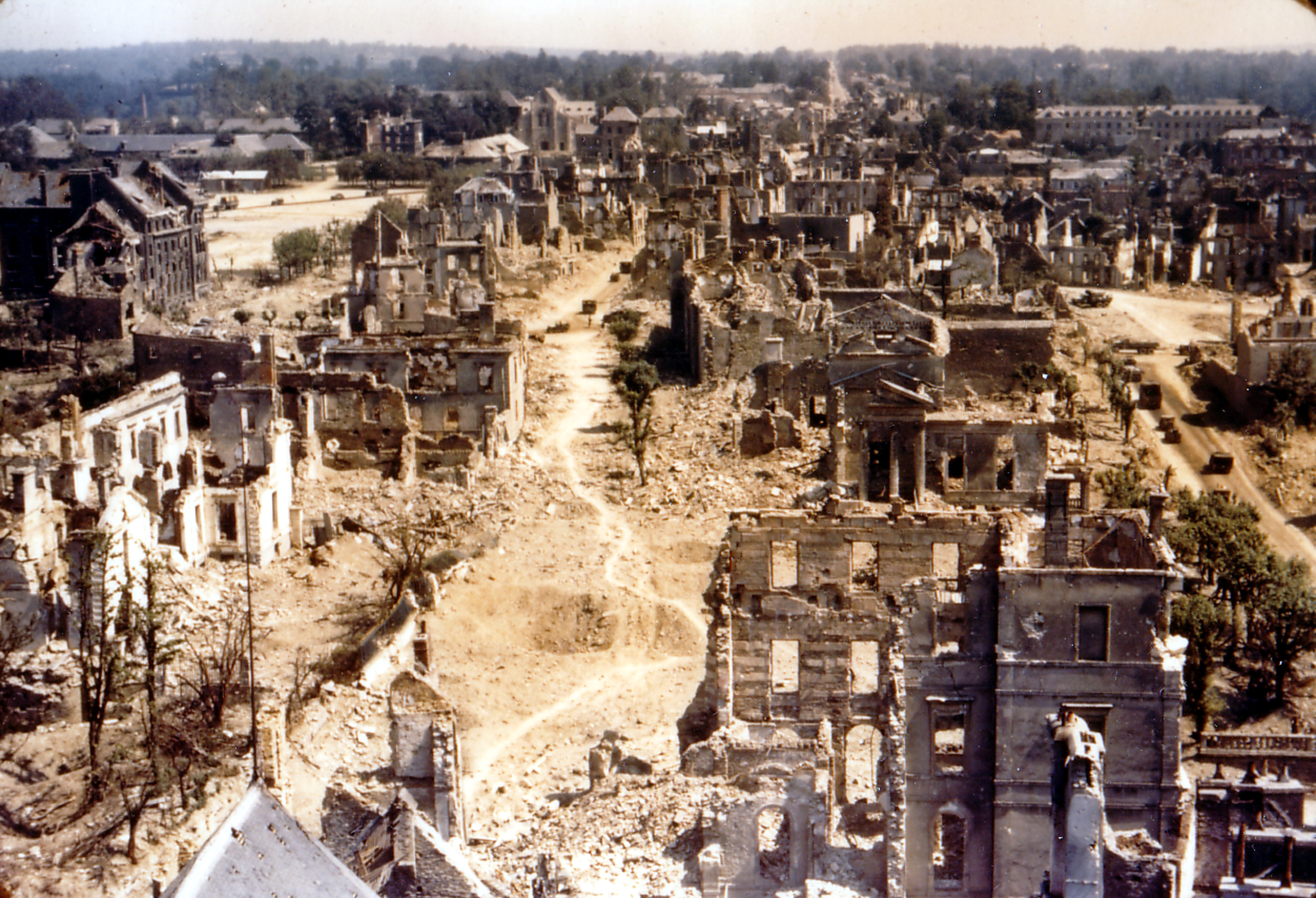
View of Saint-Lô, the “capital of ruins,” after the bombings, with the town hall in the foreground.

The stone was damaged during the American bombing of the city, as it had been kept in the town hall vestibule. This event marked "the greatest disaster in its history," when the ground floor of the building collapsed onto it. The 16th and 17th lines on the main face of the monument were almost completely erased in the fire that followed the bombing. (Note: Harmand 1965, p. 101) After the war, the stone was "cracked by fire, surface-eroded, and internally fissured by the blaze's heat."

René-Norbert Sauvage, of the Society of Antiquaries of Normandy, located the monument among the ruins and entrusted it to the archaeological society of the Manche. It was stored in a damp cellar beneath the Manche prefecture, then used as a cheese-aging room, and ended up "in a thousand pieces." The historian and epigraphist Hans-Georg Pflaum came to study it in 1947.

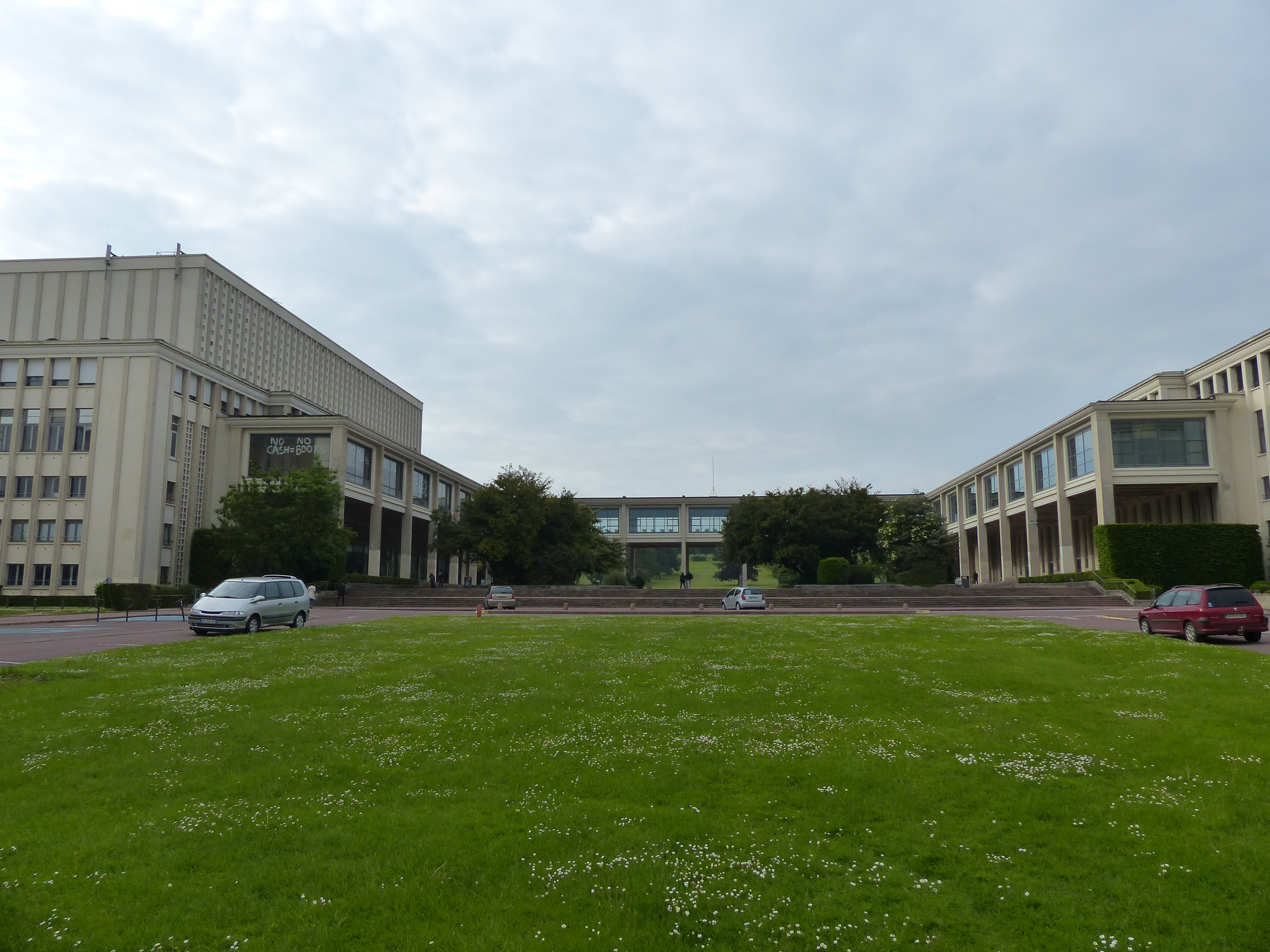
General view of Campus 1 of the University of Caen in 2010, with the Law and Literature building located at the back left.

Later, it was transferred to the University of Caen, to the basement of the Faculty of Letters, in spring 1955, at the request of Pierre Daure and with the agreement of the Saint-Lô municipality. The transport caused additional damage to the fragments. Hans-Georg Pflaum believed that these degradations resulted from the move to the Basse-Normandie capital in spring 1955. Although broken into about 12 fragments, the lower part was in better condition than the upper section. History students sorted the fragments using the stone's veining and the inscriptions. A sculptor, G. Latapie, was then tasked with its restoration. The restorer used a special cement with metallic components. The cornice was not recreated with trompe-l'œil elements to preserve the marble's "battered look."

The marble also suffered an accident on May 28, 1957, according to Louis Harmand, during its installation, which caused it to lose "beginnings and ends of lines." (Note: Harmand 1965, pp. 100–101) It fell from the crane that was supposed to place it on the second floor of the Law and Letters building and bounced down to the ground floor. A new sculptor, M. Delaville, was brought in to care for the monument.

The Thorigny marble was displayed in the entrance hall to the university library, but when the Faculty of Arts and Humanities was relocated, the monument again fell into "relative oblivion." It finally rejoined the collections of the Saint-Lô Museum in September 1989, in a corner of the entrance hall, although the Société des Antiquaires de Normandie was only informed of this new transfer in May 1990.

== Description ==
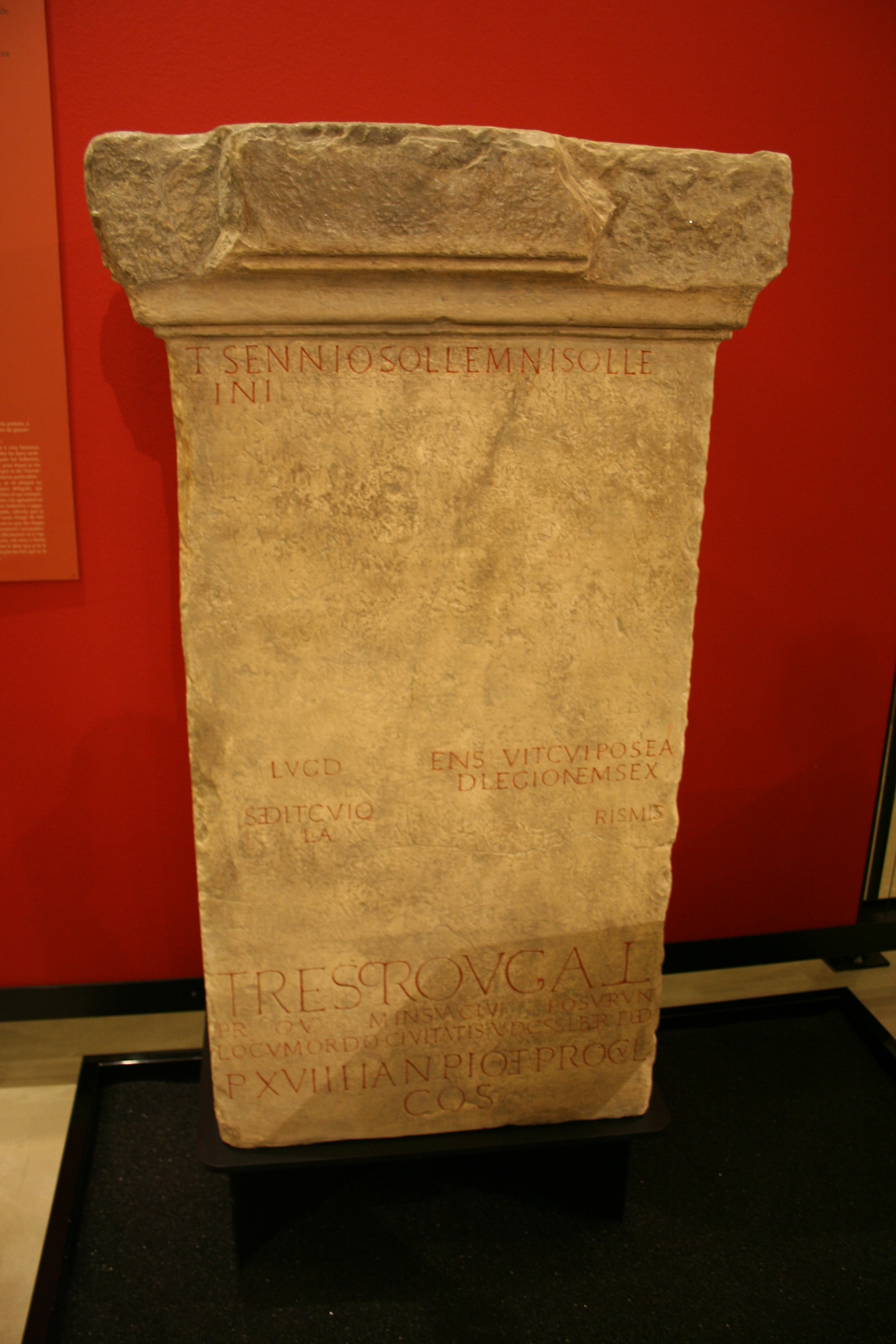
Mold of the main face of the base at the Archaeological Museum of Vieux-la-Romaine.

The Thorigny marble is in a poor state of preservation. No photographs of the monument were taken before the 1944 bombings.

The monument is made of sandstone, Cambrian arkose, which has veining and is therefore fragile. This type of stone was used locally until contemporary times. The monument measures 1.46 meters by approximately 0.85 meters. The sides are 0.56 meters wide. The monument weighs about 1.5 tons.

The marble was the pedestal for a bronze statue, "likely life-sized." There may have been a base, which appears in an 18th-century drawing, but this element is now lost. A cornice is present. The top of the Thorigny marble has holes. The figure likely had its left foot forward. Two holes at the back were meant to fix it to a wall, according to Édouard Lambert.

Only three sides bear inscriptions, the fourth having been placed against a wall according to Antoine Héron de Villefosse. (Note: Héron de Villefosse 1889, p. 518) This last face was not polished and remained in its raw state.

The monument contains 82 lines of text, approximately 390 words. The inscription is shallow, and the stonecutter used ligatures and overlapping letters for decorative effect. The lateral sides were well preserved until 1944, but the condition of the main face differs. Significant portions of the text were already missing by then, particularly the first sixteen lines. These damages were already present in the last quarter of the 18th century.

The main face includes a dedication as well as two letters on the side panels: one addressed around 223 CE by the praetorian prefect Marcus Aedinius Julianus to the governor of Gallia Lugdunensis, Badius Comnianus; the other from the propraetorian legate of Lower Britain, Tiberius Claudius Paulinus, addressed to Titus Sennius Sollemnis. The place of honor is on the right side.

=== Inscription ===
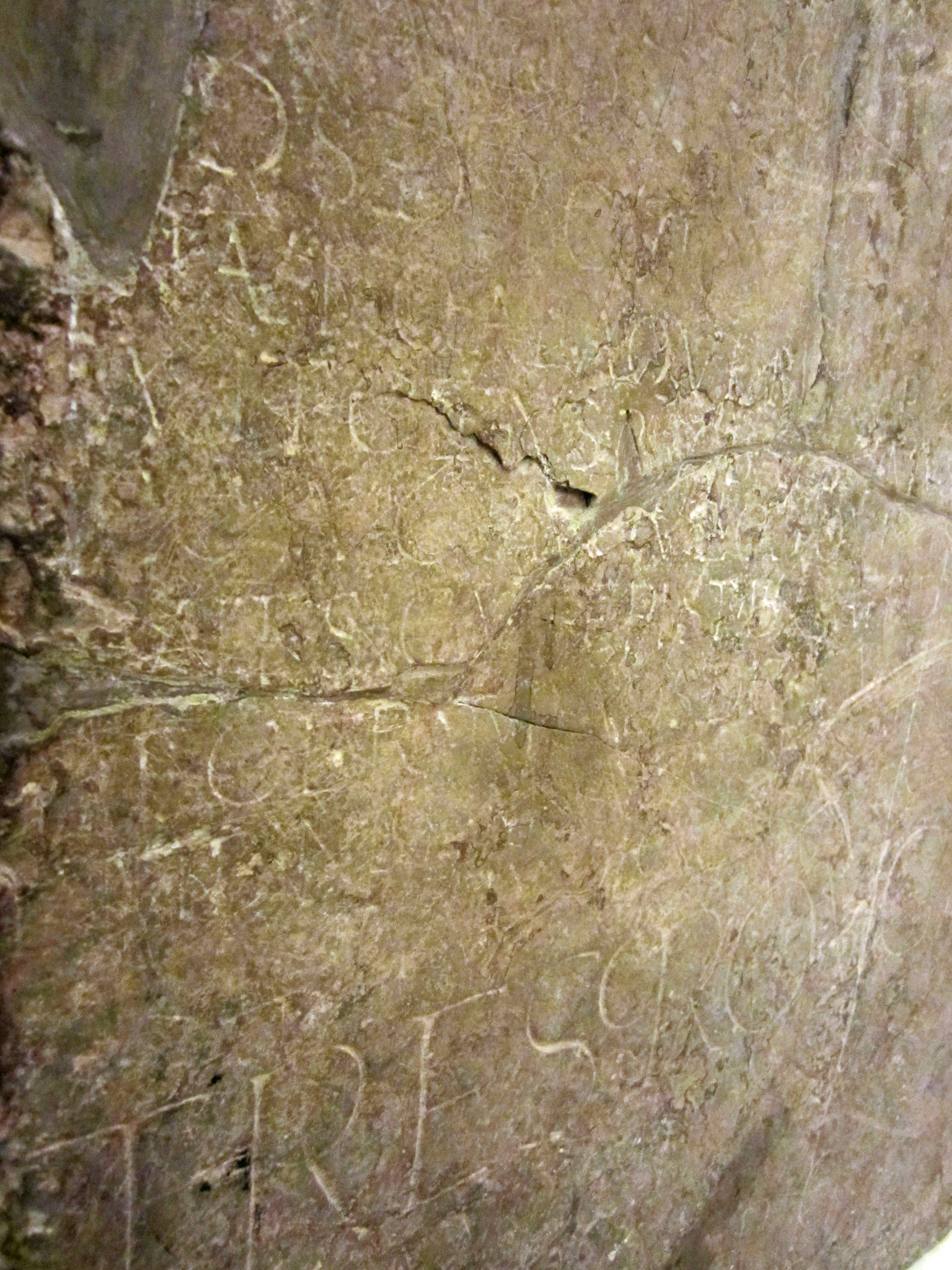
Detail of the inscription, front, second half.

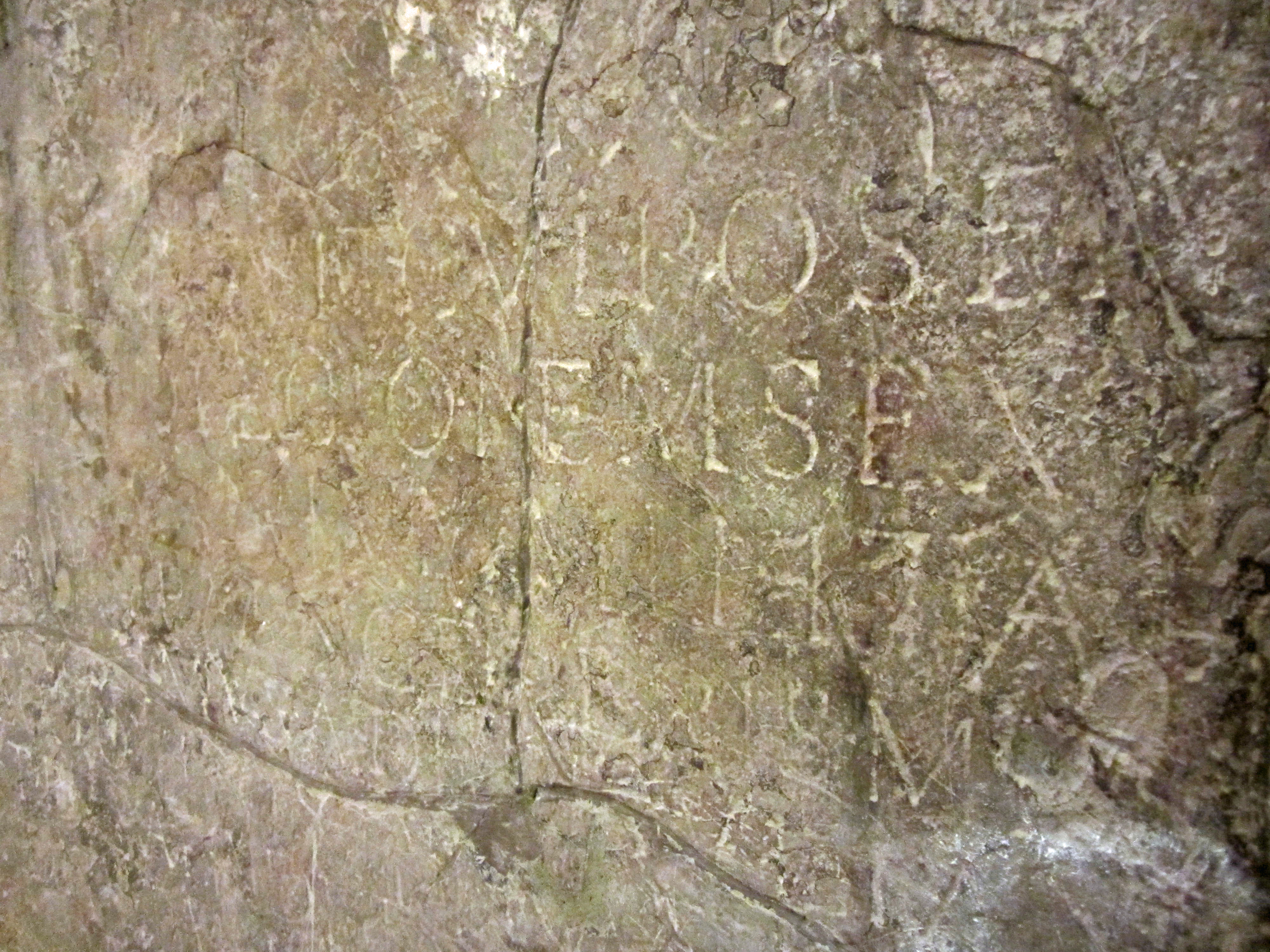
Detail of the inscription, front, top of the second half.

==== Front side ====
T(ito) Sennio Sollemni Sollem
nini fil(io) IIvir(o) sine sorte quater aug(uri)
[o]mnib(us) honorib(us) mun[icipio ---]q(ue) VII
[---]us in
[s]ua c[i]vitate eodemq(ue) tem[po]re sacerdo[s]
R[om]ae [et Augusti ad aram omn]e genus spec
taculorum e[did]it [fu]erunt gladia[to]
r[um c]ertam(ina) n(umero) XXXII ex quibus per quad
riduum [n(umero)] V[III] s[ine] missione edideru[nt]
[bal]neum quod [pop]u[lar]ibus coloniae s[uae]
pr[ofutu]rum S[ollemninus ---]ribus
funda[me]ntis inst[itutis reli]querat
consumm[av]it [item legavit ---] fructum unde
in perpetuum instauraretur is Sollemnis
amicus Tib(eri) Claud(i) Paulini leg(ati) Aug(usti) pro
pr(aetore) pro
vinc(iae) Lugd(unensis) et cliens fuit cui postea
[l]eg(ato) Aug(usti) p(ro) p(raetore) in Brit(annia) ad legio
nem sext[am]
adsedit [q]uique e[i] salarium militiae
in auro aliaque munera longe pluris missi[t]
fuit cliens probatissimus Aedini Iuliani
leg(ati) Aug(usti) prov(inciae) Lugd(unensis) qui postea
praef(ectus) praet(orio)
fuit sicut epistula quae ad latus scripta es[t]
declaratur adsedit etiam in provincia Num[id(ia)]
Lambense M(arco) Valerio Floro trib(uno) mil(itum) leg(ionis) III Aug(ustae)
iudici arcae ferrar(iarum)
tres prov(inciae) Gall(iae)
primo umquam in sua civitate posuerunt
locum ordo civitatis Viducass(ium) libera(e) dedit
p(osita) XVII K(alendas) Ian(uarias) Pio et Proculo co(n)s(ulibus)

==== Side 3 ====
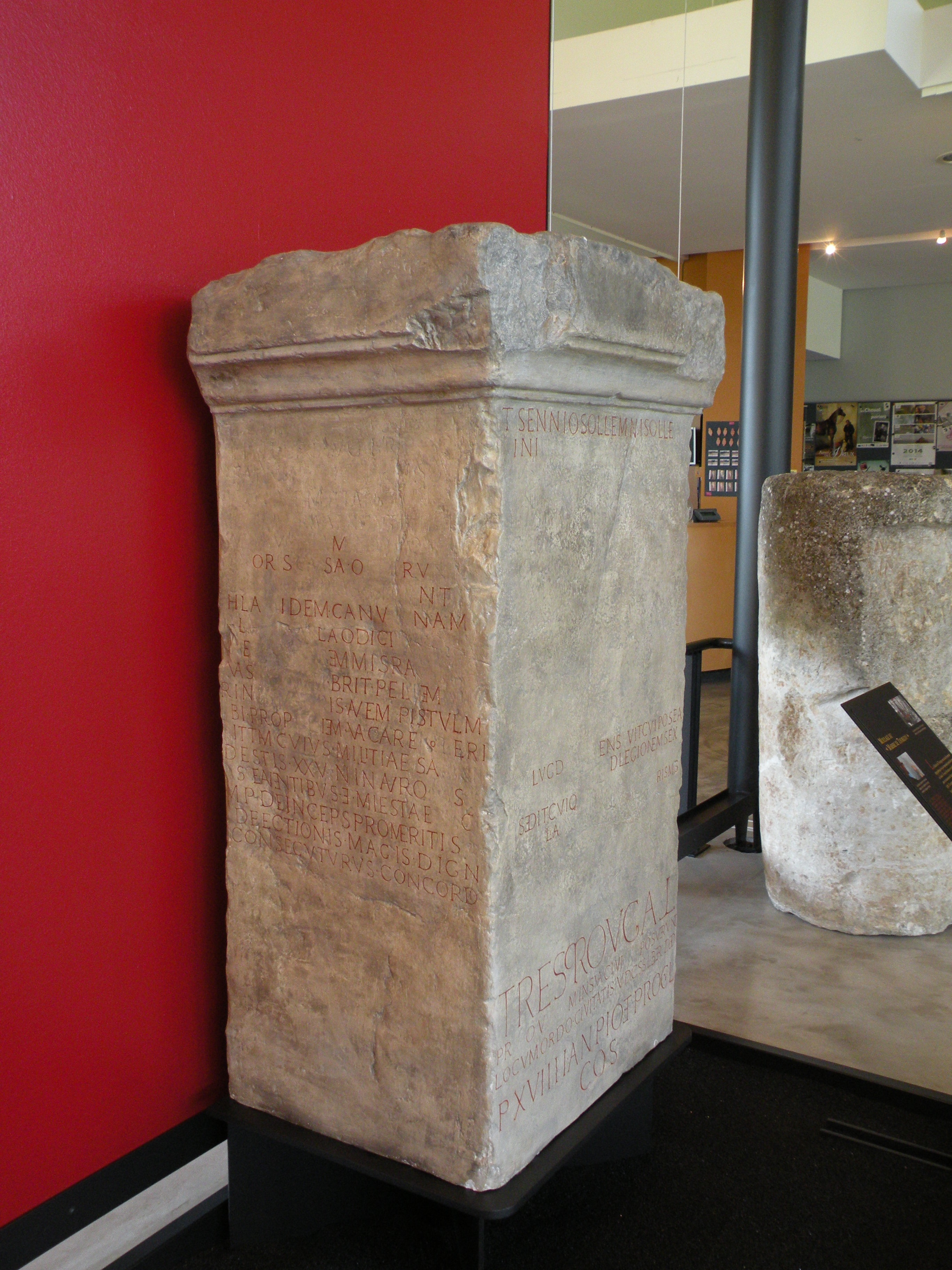
Side 3 of the Thorigny marble slab on the cast in the archaeological museum of Vieux-la-Romaine.

Left side when facing the plate.

[E]xemplum epistulae Cl(audi)
[Pa]ulini leg(ati) Aug(usti) pr(o) pr(aetore) prov(inciae)
[B]ritanniae ad Sennium Sollem
nem a Tampio
licet plura merenti tibi h[aec]
a me pauca tamen quonia[m]
honoris causa offeruntu[r]
velim accipias libente[r]
chlamidem Canusinam
dalmaticam Laodiciam fibulam
auream cum gemmis rachanas
duas tossiam Brit(annicam) pellem vituli
marini semestris autem epistulam
ubi prope diem vacare coeperi[t]
mittam cuius militiae salarium
[i]d est HS XXV(milia) n(ummum) in auro suscip[e]
[d]is faventibus et maiestate sanct[a]
Imp(eratoris) deinceps pro meritis
adfectionis magis digna
consecuturus concordit(er)

==== Side 2 ====
Right side when facing the plate.

Exemplum epistulae Aedin[i]
Iuliani praefecti praet(orio)
ad Badium Comnianum pr[o]
cur(atorem) et vice praesidis agen[t(em)]
Aedinius Iulianus Badio
Comniano sal(utem) in provincia
Lugduness(i!) quinquefascal(is)
cum agerem plerosq(ue) bonos
viros perspexi inter quos
Sollemnem istum oriundum
ex civitate Viduc(assium) sacerdote[m]
quem propter sectam gravitat[em]
et honestos mores amare coep[i]
his accedit quod cum Cl(audio) Paulin[o]
decessori meo in concilio
Galliarum instinctu quorund[am]
qui ab eo propter merita sua laes[i]
videbantur quasi ex consensu provin[c(iarum)]
accussationem instituere temtar[ent]
Sollemnis iste meus proposito eor[um]
restitit provocatione scilicet inte[rpo]
[s]ita quod patria eius cum inter ce[ter(os)]
legatum eum creasset nihil de ac
tione mandassent immo contra laud[as]
[se]nt qua ratione effectum est ut o[mnes]
[a]b accusatione desisterent que[m]
magis magisque amare et compro[bare]
coepi is certus honoris mei er[ga se]
ad videndum me in urbem venit [atq(ue)]
proficiscens petit ut eum tibi [com]
mendarem recte itaque feceris [si]
de[si]d[e]rio illius adnueris et r(eliqua)

Source: CIL XIII, 3162

=== Partial translation ===
The full text and translation are published in the monograph by Hans-Georg Pflaum in 1948 and Christian Pilet's 1984 article, compiling textual and archaeological sources from the archaeological site.

The inscription on the main face begins with the person's name being honored. This face contains the monument's dedication.

On the two lateral sides are preserved letters sent to Sennius by important individuals. The governor of Gallia Lugdunensis writes: "Although you deserve many more gifts, I ask you to kindly accept from me this modest offering... a chlamys from Canusium, a dalmatic from Laodicea, a golden fibula set with precious stones, two cloaks, a Breton garment, and a seal calfskin. As for the brevet for the six-month tribunate, I shall send it to you at the next vacancy; in the meantime, receive the pay for this rank—namely, twenty-five thousand sesterces paid in gold." Aedinius Julianus's letter of recommendation contains several elements: after recalling the circumstances, the author details the services rendered by Sollemnis, then follows with the recommendation proper, and ends with abbreviated thanks. Hans-Georg Pflaum considers the letter to be "an excellent example of the praetorian chancery's craftsmanship." The honorary inscription has a heavy and solemn tone.

== Interpretation ==
=== Historiography ===
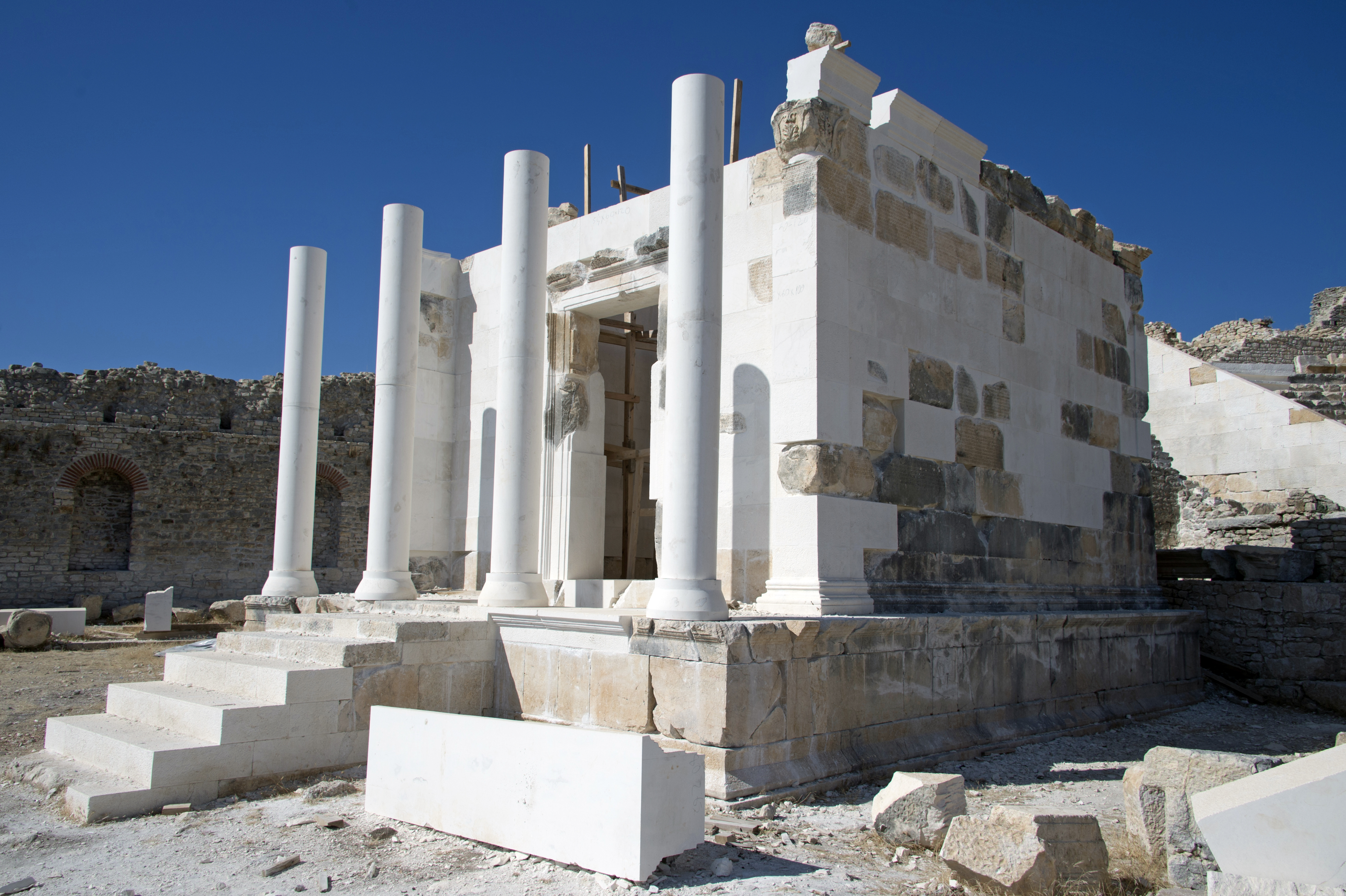
Tomb of Opramoas in Rhodiapolis in 2016.

Only seven statue pedestals for federal officials are known. (Note: Vipard 2008, p. 133) The inclusion of letters on the sides to complete the main inscription is unique in the West, though the practice is known in the East, particularly at Palmyra and at Rhodiapolis in Lycia, with the monument of Opramoas. Two inscriptions dedicated by the assembly of the Confluent to high priests in their cities are known—at Saintes (XIII, 1049) and Clermont-Ferrand (XIII, 1463)—but Sennius is the first iudex arcae ferrariarum to receive such an honor.

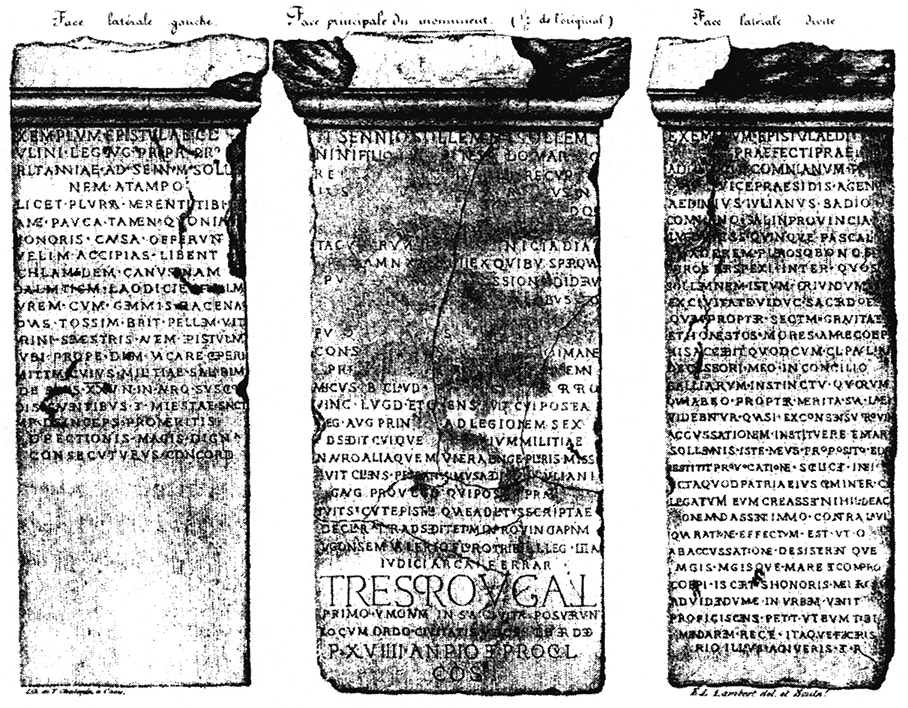
Engraving of the different sides of the Thorigny Marble, by Édouard Lambert, 1833.

The marble was attributed to the city of the Viducasses in the 17th century following debates between Antoine Galland and Daniel Huet. According to Hans-Georg Pflaum and Maurice Besnier, research before the 19th century "no longer holds much scientific interest." The monument was studied in 1826, and a transcription made by Pierre Louis Clément has since disappeared. A rubbing made by Léon Renier in 1852, which entered the library of the Institut de France, has been missing since 1947. One of the faces was published by René Cagnat in 1914. A plaster cast (M.A.N. 18729) was made in 1872 and is kept in the reserves of the National Archaeological Museum in Saint-Germain-en-Laye, only rediscovered in 2003. However, the text of the main face on this cast is fanciful.

The monument is included in the Corpus Inscriptionum Latinarum under the number C.I.L., XIII, 3162, and the text was established by Otto Hirschfeld in 1899. The quality of the work by Otto Hirschfeld and Seymour de Ricci, whose transcription dates to 1914, is still recognized in the early 21st century because it was based on the original monument before the destruction caused by the Second World War.

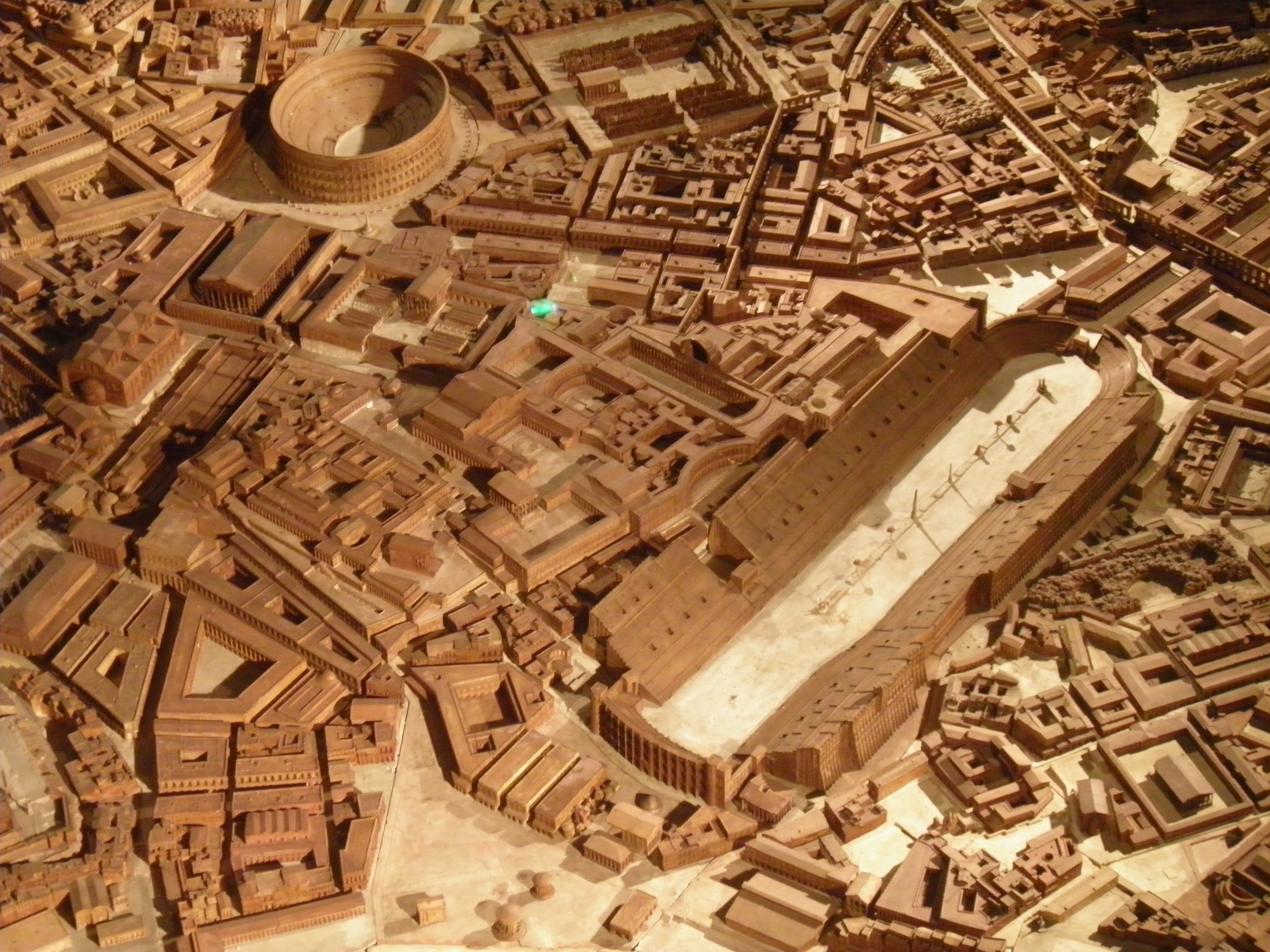
Map of Rome, area of the Circus Maximus and the Colosseum, on Paul Bigot's map exhibited at the University of Caen, displayed at the same time as the cast of Thorigny's marble in Rome in 1911.

A plaster cast sent to Rodolfo Lanciani and exhibited in 1911 at the Mostra archeologica in the Baths of Diocletian is preserved in the Museum of Roman Civilization. This copy was used to create a replica displayed in the archaeological museum of Vieux since May 2, 2004. Paul Bigot, Norman archaeologist and architect, exhibited his plaster model at the same event, which celebrated the 50th anniversary of the proclamation of the Kingdom of Italy on March 17, 1861. The exhibition gathered casts of Roman works from various regions of the Roman Empire.

The works of Maurice Besnier in the 1910s and 1920s helped clarify the history of the monument's discovery. According to Élisabeth Deniaux, the inscription received a "definitive edition" in 1948 by Hans-Georg Pflaum, and it is to this edition that the monument owes its renown. This edition has served as the scientific reference ever since, although it focuses on the historical and political context of the year 238. (Note: Vipard 2008, p. 135) Hans-Georg Pflaum established the text and developed his commentary based on it. Pascal Vipard considers that "with a few details aside, his work retains all its value."

Pascal Vipard, who believes that the tribute paid to Hans-Georg Pflaum is well deserved, wished in 2008 to focus on the person of Titus Sennius Sollemnis, but concluded his book by stating that "we are still far from having resolved all the problems posed by the text and its implications." (Note: Vipard 2008, p. 149) A study day was dedicated to the monument at its place of exhibition on Saturday, June 10, 2017.

=== Trajectory of a member of the Gallo-Roman elite ===
Titus Sennius Sollemnis bears the tria nomina at a time when the praenomen was disappearing. Sennius is formed from the Gaulish word senos (old). Sollemnis derives from the Latin word for "solemn." The figure must have had a certain degree of political and financial importance.

The career of Titus Sennius Sollemnis is not very well known. He held "municipal and provincial positions." Gaps in the text include lines relating to part of Sollemnis's cursus honorum. However, the Thorigny Marble allows us to identify Sollemnis as a member of "the highest spheres of the Gallic municipal elites."

==== Local functions ====
The beginnings of Sollemnis's career are summarized in the phrase "having held all honors." The "minor offices" cannot be reconstructed. Titus Sennius Sollemnis held functions in a municipal and a provincial context; in this regard, he is "a good representative of the municipal aristocracies of Gaul" and also demonstrates the interactions between Gallic elites and the Roman ruling class.

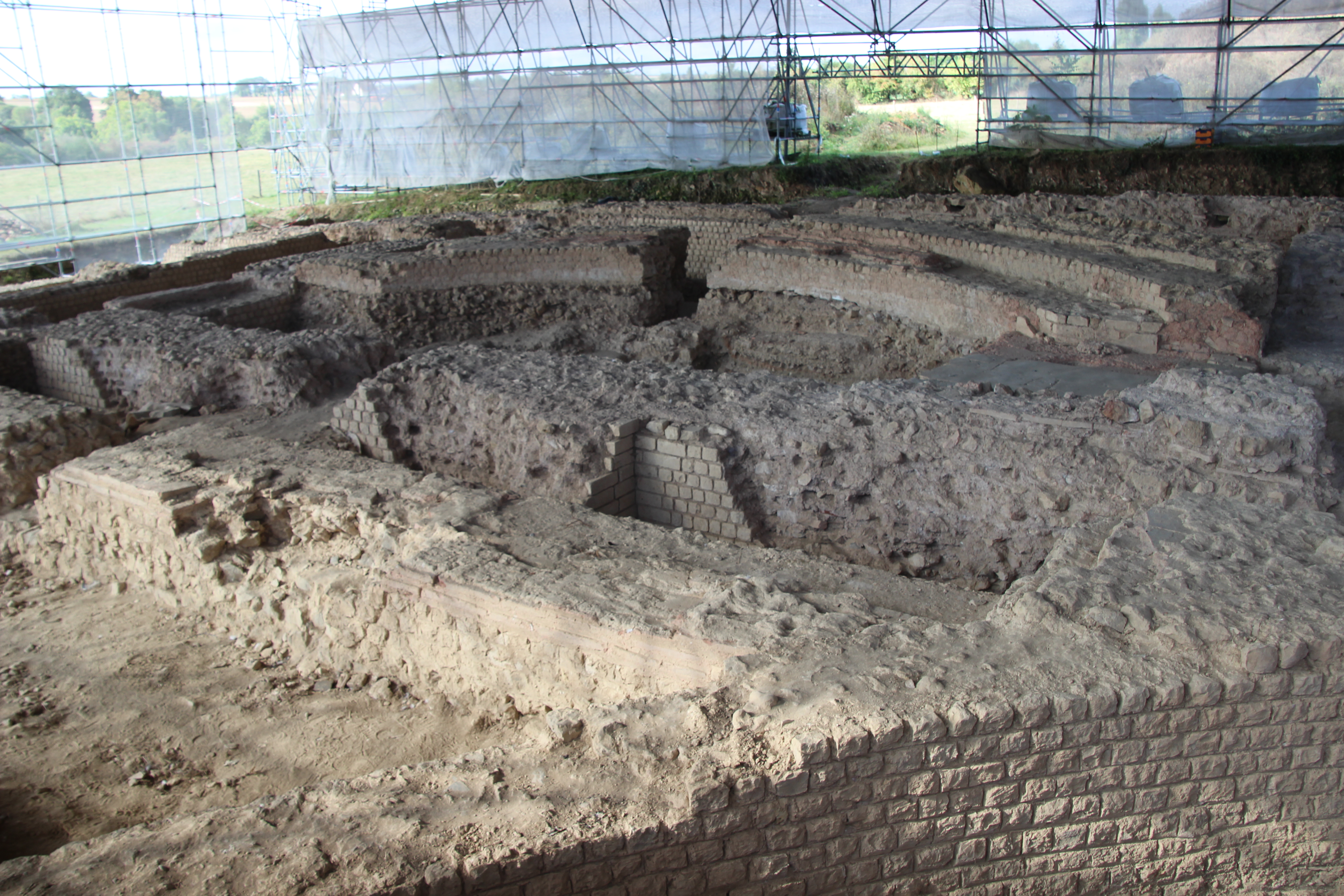
View of the Curia of the forum of Vieux-la-Romaine, seat of local power, in 2016.

He was elected duumvir four times, sine sorte, without drawing lots, by the people beyond the decurions. Titus Sennius Sollemnis always won the majority, which demonstrates the prestige he must have enjoyed, "without any competitor of comparable rank" in a town of modest size. Sollemnis's candidacy may have prevailed even though he did not hold the five-year duumvirate, an office that likely existed in Aregenua.

People had to reach a high level in the cursus honorum before aspiring to religious roles. Only two religious offices are cited; the others are likely included under a general formula in the inscription. He also held religious offices such as augur and flamen of the imperial cult, "the highest and most prestigious level in the city." The office of augur, held collegially and largely honorific in nature, existed in both Narbonese Gaul and Lugdunensis. The city's imperial flamen, responsible for the cult of Augustus and sometimes of Rome, was a former duumvir whose term lasted a year. He was "the most prestigious public priest of the city" and held "the highest rank in the municipal career." Historians debate the role of this office in accessing the federal priesthood—some believe it is unnecessary, others see it as required. Only the city flamines could travel to Lyon to the federal sanctuary, and the Viducassian document is essential for understanding the ambassadorial role played by local representatives.

==== Federal priest ====
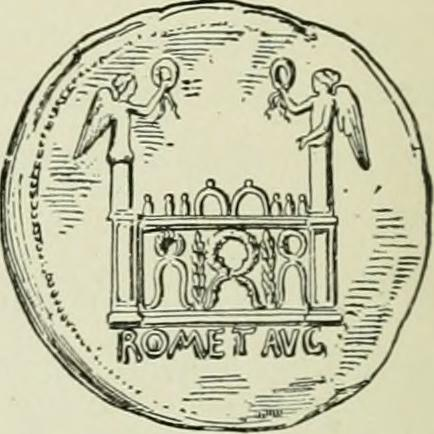
Altar of Rome and Augustus, depicted on a sesterce minted in Lyon during the reign of Augustus.

Sollemnis may have served as high priest of the imperial cult, a "very rare honor," in the cult of Rome and Augustus at the Altar of the Confluence. Only 64 cities were represented on this Council, perhaps by former flamines, though this thesis is not universally accepted. The Council of the Three Gauls functioned from 12 BCE until the 260s CE.

The modest town of Vieux likely rarely had the opportunity to appoint a high priest. The role of high priest was religious and honorific. The two religious functions, local and provincial, could have been held simultaneously, according to one interpretation of the inscription that remains debated. The issue of simultaneity is problematic since presence in the city was required; perhaps there were two flamines, one of whom could fulfill that requirement.

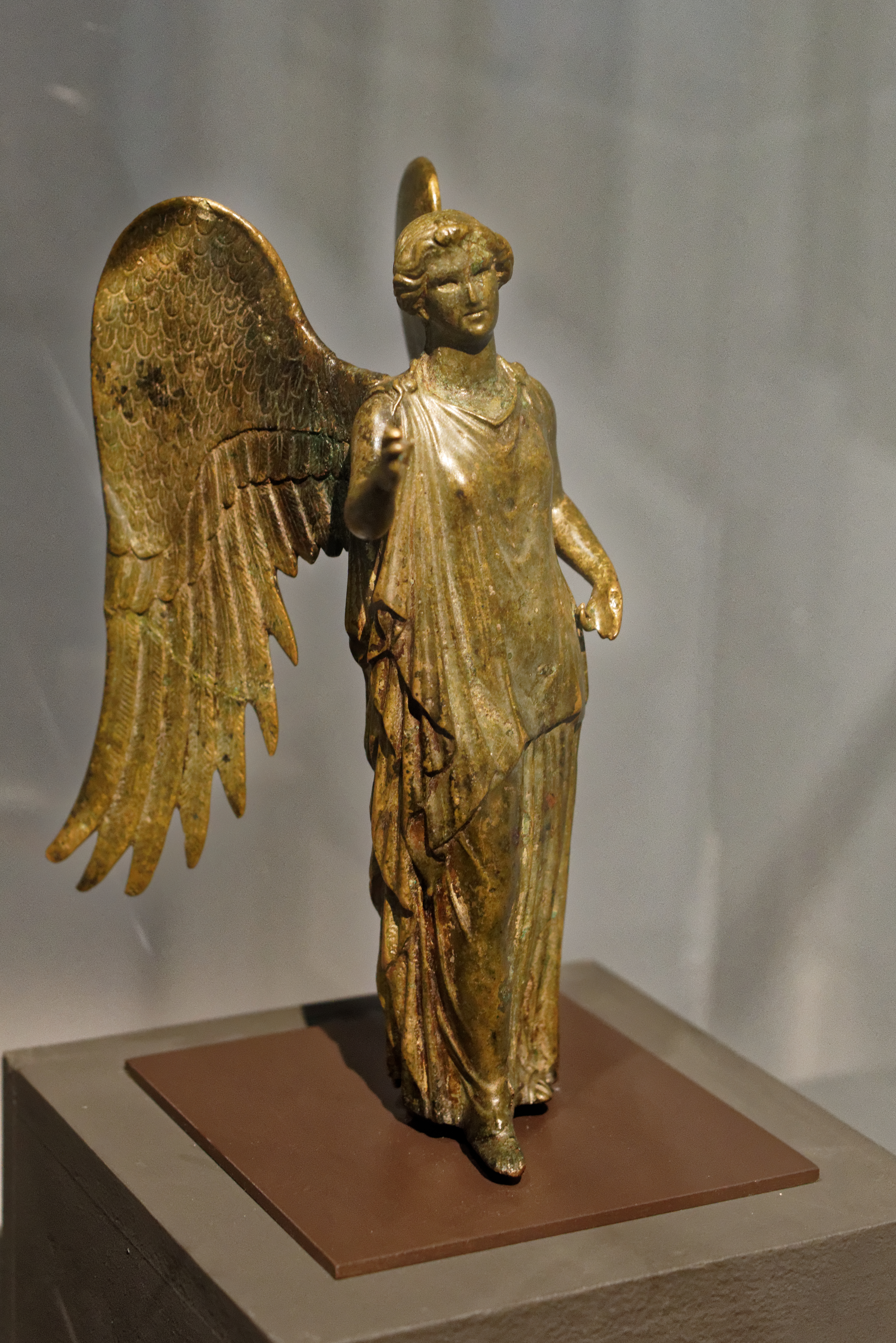
Victory of the Altar of the Three Gauls, kept at the Lugdunum Museum.

Pascal Vipard considers that the high priest may have been chosen from among the previous year's legati, with a role as local priest during the same year. Appointment as flamen may have been sufficient, along with financial capacity to fulfill the obligations of the office. Several hundred legati gathered for the celebration of the cult of Rome and the Emperor in August, and they elected the high priest. (Note: Vipard 2008, p. 116) According to Hans-Georg Pflaum, the delegates from the Viducasses were three in number. Local notables feared election to this office because of the financial burdens it entailed, particularly the amphitheater games to be held at the Confluence.

One office held by Sollemnis is detailed in the letter of Aedinus Julianus (II, 14-16): the legatio, a mission to deliver messages conducted by former decurions. Sollemnis defended the outgoing governor, Tiberius Claudius Paulinus, against a plan to bring charges initiated by some representatives acting for personal motives. Sollemnis defended Paulinus during a meeting with his successor, Julianus, arguing that the proceedings were inadmissible since they were not based on the will of those who had sent the accusing representatives.

==== Military functions ====
Sollemnis carried out a mission with the legate of Lower Britain, as a tribunus semestris. For six months, he commanded a troop of one hundred cavalrymen. The emperor made an appointment to this equestrian-rank post after consultation with or by the governor. According to Hans-Georg Pflaum, Sollemnis did not carry out this mission due to the lack of a post. The situation may also have resulted from a change of governor, according to A. Birley—Tiberius Claudius Paulinus may have died or fallen from grace under the reign of Severus Alexander. This theory does not hold because the governor had already changed before the emperor did, and the hypothesis "is not based on solid grounds." Sollemnis may have been a member of the cohors amicorum or a legal advisor to Paulinus. According to Pascal Vipard, he may have been a legionary tribune, as indicated on face III of the marble.

Sollemnis received his pay and gifts before the appointment: since Hadrian's time, officers designated by the emperor or his local representatives received such provisions. (Note: Vipard 2008, p. 100) His pay was given to him in gold, along with luxury items, including a uniform and all the equipment the officer would need. (Note: Vipard 2008, p. 101) The equipment can be reconstructed from the information in the Thorigny Marble: the officer wore a chlamys from Canusium, red or russet. (Note: Vipard 2008, p. 102) He also wore a dalmatica from Laodicea, a gold fibula adorned with stones to fasten the chlamys on the right shoulder. (Note: Vipard 2008, pp. 102–103) The officer was also provided with two types of blankets: rachanæ and a tossia britannica. (Note: Vipard 2008, pp. 103–104) A seal skin is mentioned, found in the Edict of Diocletian. It was believed to "protect from lightning," and a tent made from this material was recommended. (Note: Vipard 2008, p. 104) The elements described in the marble appear to concern military gifts. (Note: Vipard 2008, pp. 106–107) The gifts received by Sennius have been calculated as exceeding his pay, with a minimum estimate of 33,000 sesterces. The sum of 25,000 sesterces corresponds to the pay of a tribunus semestris.

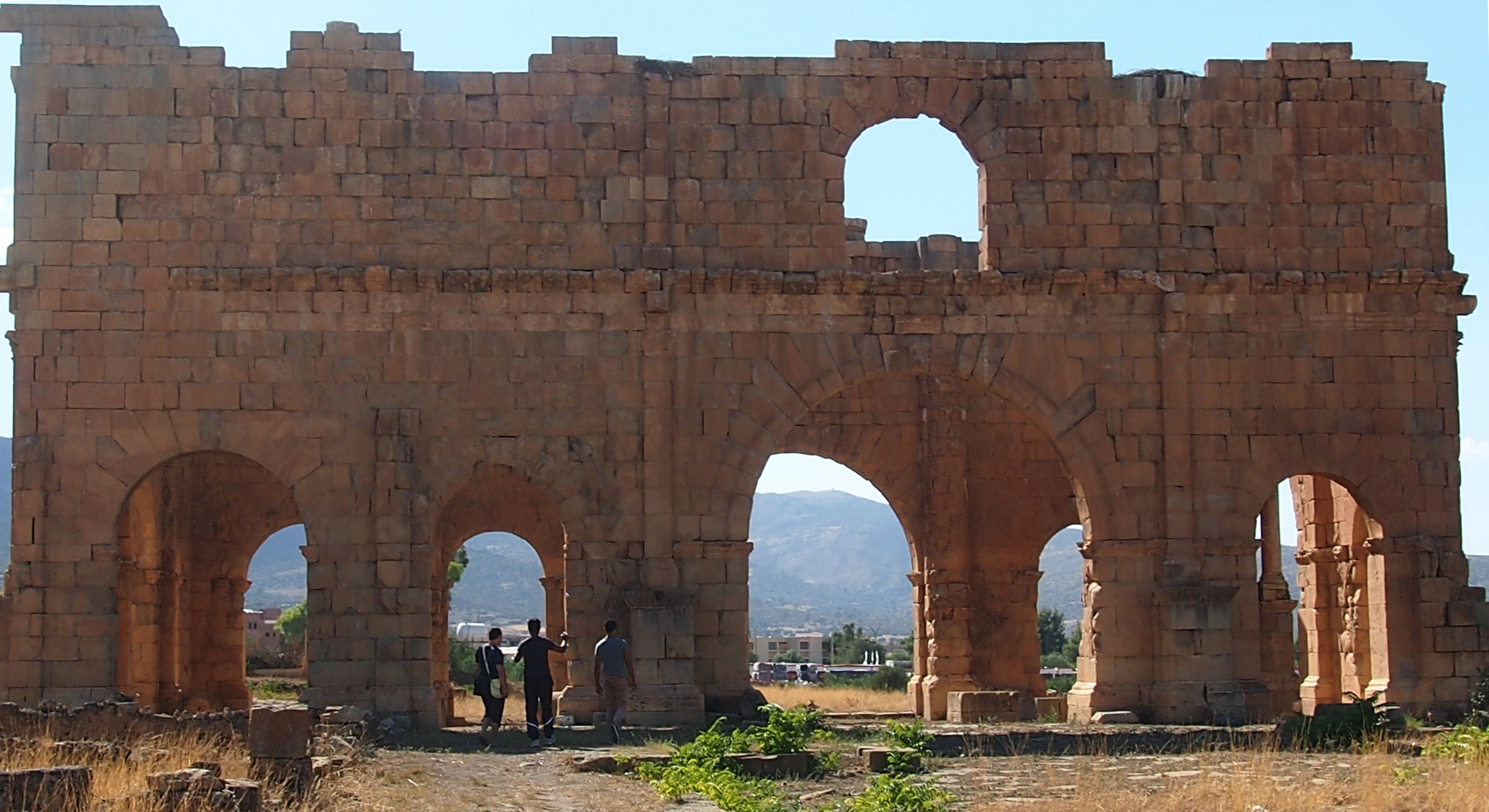
Headquarters of the Legio III Augusta in Lambèse.

After his service in Britain, Sollemnis served Marcus Valerius Florus, military tribune of the Legio III Augusta at Lambaesis in Numidia. This mission is barely described in the inscription. According to Hans-Georg Pflaum, Sollemnis was then a legal assistant, though a military role is also plausible. (Note: Vipard 2008, p. 107) The information may come from a letter by Marcus Valerius Florus, not included due to lack of space or by intention. The scant information about Sollemnis's role within the III Legion may be linked to the legion's role in the fall of Gordian I and II. Loyal to Maximinus, it was shortly thereafter dissolved by the Senate or Gordian III. (Note: Vipard 2008, pp. 137–138)

==== Federal civil function: iudex arcæ ferrariarum ====
The federal administration managed daily affairs. Federal officials are rarely mentioned in epigraphy. Sollemnis held the position of iudex arcae ferrariarum after serving as a priest. The position was under the authority of the Council of the Gauls. Sollemnis served in this role, which had not previously existed, at the time of the statue's erection; his departure from the post served as the pretext. The title appears isolated, just before a line referencing the Tres Provinciae Galliarum in large letters, intended to highlight the sponsors of the statue's erection ostentatiously. (Note: Vipard 2008, pp. 135–136) These functions would not normally justify the erection of a statue, and the text of the marble is the longest inscription ever engraved in honor of an imperial official.

This concerned the management of iron mines, whose organization is poorly known in Gaul. The term iudex in this case corresponds to "officer in charge of a treasury" and would be a transposition of a Gallic title, somewhat like the suffete of the Phoenician and Punic world. He is only the first of the judges of the Iron Mines Treasury. It is unknown whether the position was paid or not. Pascal Vipard seems to favor the idea that it was unpaid, even though remuneration for such a position would have been modest, on the order of 100,000 sesterces annually. Administrative duties were sometimes, however, motivated by financial objectives. Jérôme Carcopino believes that Sollemnis held this office in his city and may have been a "magnate of the old iron industry of the Viducasses." During the exercise of this office, he seems to have been able to conduct personal business, according to some researchers. (Note: Vipard 2008, pp. 128–130)

==== Titus Sennius Sollemnis as benefactor: games at the amphitheater and completion of the baths ====
Benefaction allowed the wealthiest citizens to pursue a political career. By financing the completion of the baths at Aregenua and offering four days of gladiatorial games, Sennius presents himself as a perfect benefactor.

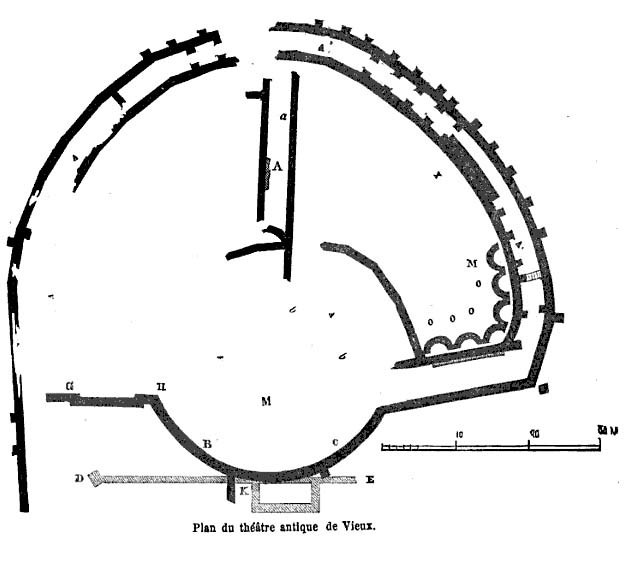
Plan of the theater of Vieux drawn during excavations carried out in the 19th century (north is in the upper left corner of the drawing). This building undoubtedly housed the games given in the city by Titus Sennius Sollemnis.

He funded gladiator combats in Lugdunum and also in his native city. The games held in Lugdunum are more fully detailed in the inscription. These games were mandatory for priests of the imperial cult during the 2nd and 3rd centuries. Thirty-two pairs of gladiators are mentioned for the games held at the Confluence. These games lasted four days, with eight combats held each day. Hans-Georg Pflaum estimated the rental cost at 332,000 sesterces, not including the prizes awarded at the end of the combats. The amount corresponds to a year's income from an estate of 558 hectares, the value of that estate being over 2.2 million sesterces. (Note: Vipard 2008, p. 127) Among these combats, eight were sine missione—meaning with risk and the possibility of a fighter being killed. The benefactor was also expected to offer other morning shows. Total expenses were likely over 500,000 sesterces. Sollemnis also offered shows in Vieux, games which must have been memorable. Games given at the local level were not mandatory.

He financed the completion of the baths and their perpetual maintenance, though the amount is unknown.

With the expenditures linked to the thermal building, the total probably exceeded one million sesterces, without even considering the rest of the benefactions throughout his career or his lifestyle. (Note: Vipard 2008, pp. 125–126)

The fact that the Council erected the monument in his city of origin is unusual, as is the transcription of "two official letters."

=== Evolution of the institutional history of Gaul ===
There was "no standard career in Gaul." Sollemnis was duovir sine sorte, a function attested nowhere else. Vieux is described as a civitas libera, a city with Latin rights. The fact that Sollemnis did not serve as a five-year duumvir may be evidence of the dominance of an oligarchy over certain magistracies or of a monopoly situation resulting from the financial obligations attached to these offices.

The city benefited from Latin rights and tax exemptions. (Note: Vipard 2008, p. 142) Ten cities in Gaul had the status of colony, including Vieux. (Note: Vipard 2008, p. 143) The colony status may have applied to the entire territory of the Viducasses. (Note: Vipard 2008, pp. 143–144) Since Vieux had both colonia and libertas status, the situation was privileged, though the date is unknown. (Note: Vipard 2008, pp. 145–146) The granting of privileges may be linked to an intervention by the family of the Sennii at the end of the 2nd or the beginning of the 3rd century. (Note: Vipard 2008, pp. 146–147) The gift of the baths to the city may coincide with the granting of privileges and may even have a causal relationship, though these hypotheses cannot be substantiated.

==== Accession to the equestrian order ====
The Thorigny marble mentions a benefactor role during the career of Titus Sennius Sollemnis, indicating that he was a man of great wealth. (Note: Vipard 2008, p. 123) The completion of the bath complex may have been driven by a desire to finish the work of his father, who had died prematurely, but it may also be linked to a legal obligation to fulfill pledges since the time of Trajan. The cost of the construction site is unknown. (Note: Vipard 2008, pp. 124–125) Vieux likely had few benefactors, and the Sennii may have been "the dominant clan of Viducassian political life."

Hans-Georg Pflaum does not believe that Sollemnis accessed the equestrian order. Some specialists in the 1970s, however, considered that he did. (Note: Vipard 2008, pp. 107–108) He appears to have had the "financial, political, or social standing" for such access, and the title of knight is not indicated in inscriptions from Gaul or Germania contemporary with Sollemnis. (Note: Vipard 2008, pp. 108–109) The military career was one route to the equestrian rank, but Sollemnis's career is "not well developed." (Note: Vipard 2008, p. 109) Becoming an equestrian officer allowed notables to join the equestrian order—Yann Le Bohec described the appointment as a "soap for commoners." The third face of the marble may perhaps refer to the change of status. Moreover, Paulinus refers to a payment in gold, which may reflect the monetary devaluation of billon coinage.

The knights of Gaul held few administrative roles in the Empire during Sollemnis's time; for some knights "lacking military ambitions," joining the equestrian order granted greater recognition within their province and "a notable mark of social superiority." (Note: Vipard 2008, pp. 109–110)

==== Evidence of patronage relationships ====
The letters transcribed on the Thorigny Marble may have come from Sollemnis's archives or those of the praetorium or the legate of Britannia. (Note: Vipard 2008, p. 137) The Thorigny marble is evidence of patronage and client relationships already present during the last century of the Roman Republic. Sollemnis maintained dependency relationships with Tiberius Claudius Paulinus and Aedinius Julianus, governors of Lyonnaise, and perhaps also with Badius Comnianus and Valerius Florus. (Note: Vipard 2008, pp. 110–111) Aedinius became prefect of Egypt in 223. He was named praetorian prefect the same year and attained the rank of senator at the same time.

Titus Sennius Sollemnis is a friend and client of Paulinus. The question arises as to the evolution of the ties between Sollemnis and Paulinus—from cliens to amicus—which could relate to the dedication seeking to emphasize a relationship of lesser dependence, but also to help rendered by the Viducassian before officially entering his clientele. (Note: Vipard 2008, pp. 111–112)

Sollemnis visits Julianus in Rome, who is prefect of the praetorium, and is likely hosted by him under the rules of hospitium. Subsequently, he is recommended by Julianus to the new governor Comnianus, with the request for recommendation made just before he departed from the Urbs. According to Pascal Vipard, the relationship is "asymmetrical," as Sollemnis is depicted as the petitioner. (Note: Vipard 2008, pp. 112–113) Sollemnis comes to pay homage to his patron and, according to Hans-Georg Pflaum, to congratulate him on his appointment as prefect and his accession to the senatorial class; the gesture also enhances Sollemnis's status and positions him as "one of the most prominent men in Gaul."

Paulinus' letter is familiar and friendly, but without any explicit bond of dependency; the author seems to hold Sollemnis in "high regard." (Note: Vipard 2008, p. 113) On the main face, friendly or patron-client relationships prevailed over hierarchy. Paulinus is presented before Aedinius, and Florus comes last.

The two letters adopt different tones: friendly in Paulinus' case, haughty in Julianus'. This difference is also evident in the way the relationships between the protagonists are presented on the main face of the monument. (Note: Vipard 2008, p. 114) Julianus' letter shows how he came to know Sollemnis for his moral principles and his actions toward Tiberius Claudius Paulinus. (Note: Vipard 2008, pp. 115–116) Julianus' letter is "a magnificent example of a letter of recommendation," a type of letter intended to be made public. (Note: Vipard 2008, pp. 114–115)

Sennius enjoyed "remarkable notoriety." Receiving such recognition as the erection of a monument was quite exceptional, and in this case, the recognition did not come from his city. (Note: Vipard 2008, pp. 132–133) The text also shows just how integrated this Gallic notable was within the Empire. His network of friends (governors, military tribunes) connected him to the Roman ruling class. The inscription attests to the good relations between the sponsor and members of the Roman elite during a time of unrest, as it marked the transition between the reigns of Maximinus and Gordian III.

==== Testimony to a troubled political period ====
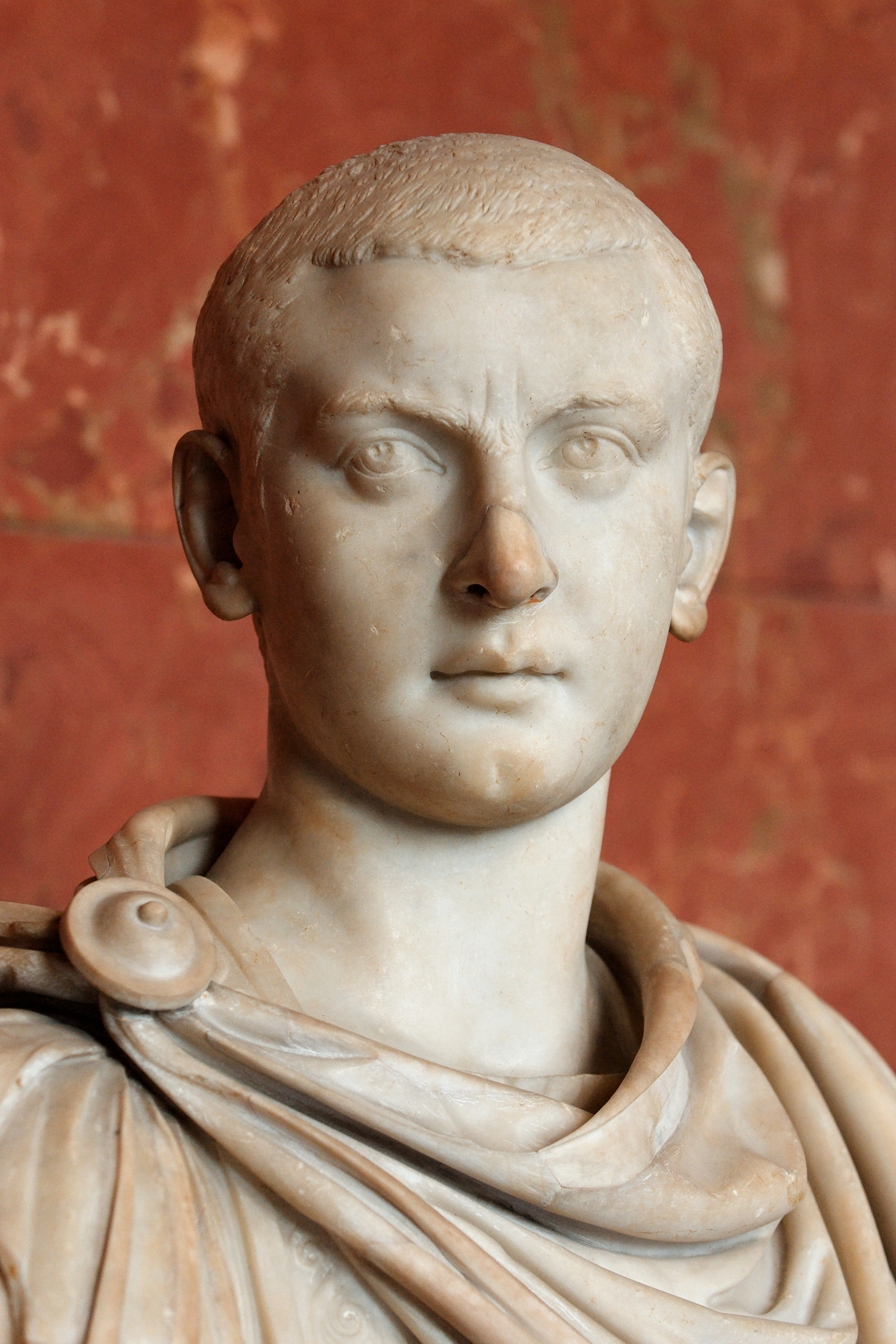
Detail of the bust of Gordian III preserved at the Louvre Museum, Ma1063.

The inscription highlights the relationships of Titus Sennius Sollemnis with individuals close to the Severan dynasty. (Note: Vipard 2008, p. 136) Sollemnis is a known member, due to the Thorigny marble, of an influential group during the reigns of Elagabalus (218–222), Severus Alexander (222–235), and Gordian III (238–244). The erection of the marble monument allowed a rapprochement with the "faithful of the former regime." The assembly decided to build the monument eighteen years after Titus Sennius Sollemnis' tenure as high priest, and the considerable expense was linked to "powerful and urgent political motives." The statue was dedicated on December 16, 238, four months after the annual assembly of August 1, which indicates a very rapid implementation. Because of the political role of the monument, it is assumed that another building must have existed in Condate, where it would have been more visible than in Aregenua. A marble bust, a copy of a bronze, was discovered in 1836 and represents a middle-aged man. The piece, dated between 235 and 244, is said by Pierre Quoniam to represent either Timesitheus or an important notable: an Arvernian, C. Atilius Marcellus, a Mediomatrici, C. Sacconius Adnatus, or the Viducassian Sollemnis. (Note: Vipard 2008, pp. 139–140)

The period of military anarchy began in 235 with the assassination of Alexander Severus. According to Hans-Georg Pflaum, the Council of Gaul had largely supported Maximinus (235–238), and since Sollemnis had not collaborated with him, he was able to become the figurehead for the "rallying of former supporters of Maximinus." At the same time, the authority of Gordian III was being contested, and Spain was in revolt in 239. The supporters of Severus Alexander returned to power, and there was then a fear of reprisals from the Council of Gaul. Sollemnis remained an important figure in this context, even though no further details can be specified. Sennius, friend of Paulinus and client of Aedinius, had remained loyal to them around fifteen years after the recommendation letters were sent, and among Gallic nobles, he was one of those who had "the most influence in Rome." He may have remained the "soul of the resistance" under Maximinus. Sennius is thought to have reported to his patrons the honors he received in Gaul, with the association of their letters to the monument. Pflaum speaks of solidarity between Paulinus and Julianus, two successive governors from different orders (senatorial for one, equestrian for the other), the solidarity of the propertied classes being strong "in the defense of their privileges and positions."

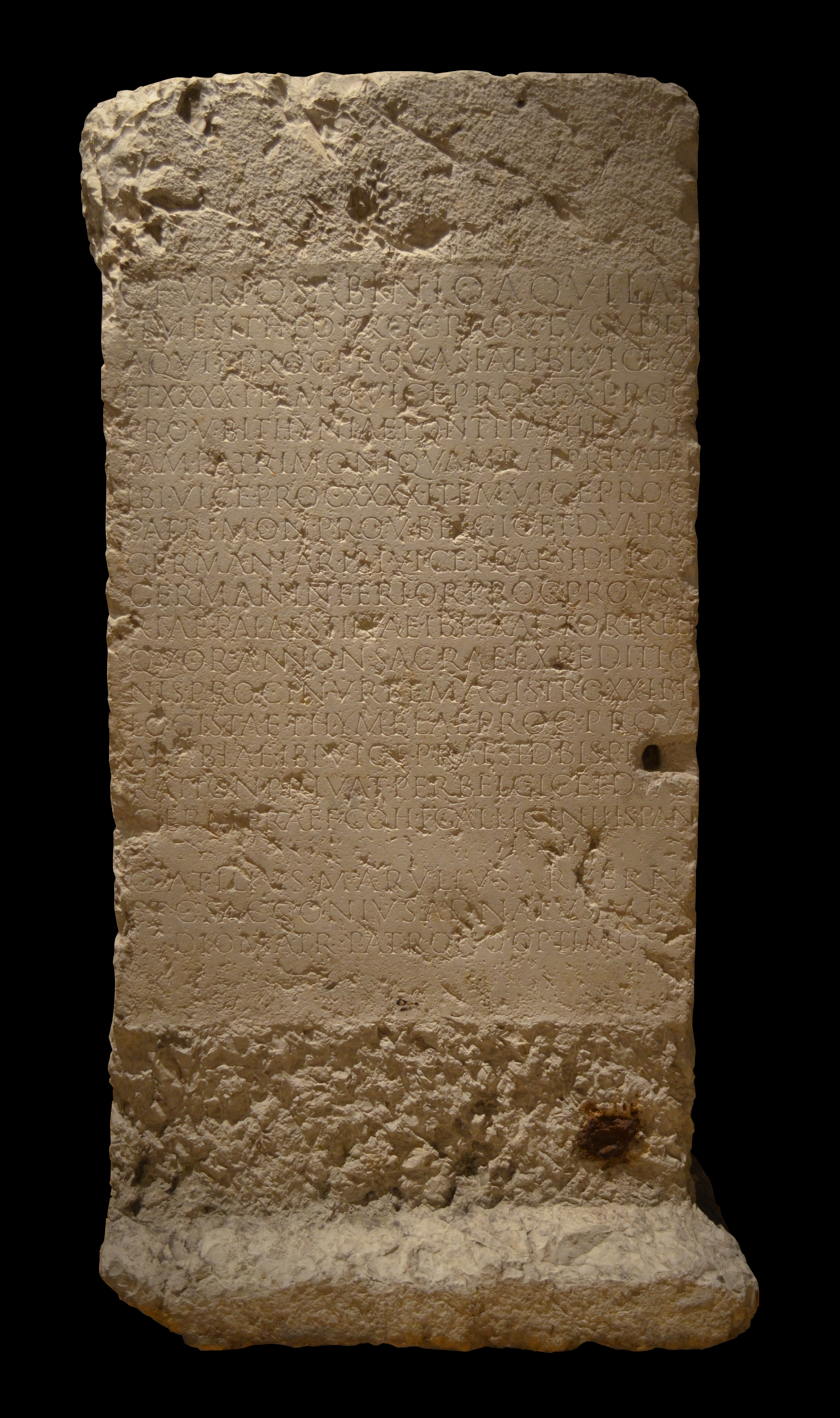
Cursus honorum of Timésithée on a pedestal, the figure is the patron of the Thorigny marble according to Hans-Georg Pflaum. Gallo-Roman Museum of Fourvière in Lyon. CIL XIII, 1807.

According to epigrapher Hans-Georg Pflaum, the sponsor was Timesitheus, procurator of Lugdunensis and Aquitania in 238, who fell into disgrace under Gordian III (238–244) after having served under Severus Alexander and Maximinus. Sollemnis may have helped him due to his contacts in Rome. Timesitheus had excellent relations with the Assembly of the Confluence and maintained excellent relations with the Syrian princesses: Julia Domna (wife of Septimius Severus), Julia Maesa, Julia Soaemias, and Julia Mamaea. He rallied to Maximinus as soon as he could. At the beginning of Gordian III's reign, and at the time of the Thorigny marble, he was in disgrace. In 241, he was appointed Praetorian Prefect and became the emperor's father-in-law when Tranquillina married Gordian. Timesitheus is said to have come to power through the intercession of the Senate and demonstrated in his role a "genius for grand organization" before his sudden death. This theory is not unanimously accepted, as it is fragile and of a "conjectural nature."

The marble was erected in a troubled context of the senatorial party's return to power, with Sollemnis being either a very important person capable of supporting the federal council or someone manipulated in the context of that same council's return to favor. (Note: Vipard 2008, pp. 138–139) Other individuals in Gaul may have played a comparable role, but no conclusive evidence has survived. (Note: Vipard 2008, p. 139) The Thorigny Marble also symbolizes the peace restored after the Civil War.

== See also ==
- Roman Gaul
- Torigni-sur-Vire
- Sandstone
- Battle of Saint-Lô
- Severan dynasty

== Bibliography ==
=== General works or works on Vieux-la-Romaine ===
- Bertin, Dominique (1977). "La topographie de Vieux - Araegenuae (Calvados), capitale de la cité des Viducasses, d'après les fouilles anciennes et les sondages récents" [The topography of Vieux-Araegenuae (Calvados), capital of the Viducasses, based on ancient excavations and recent surveys.]. Annales de Normandie (in French). 27 (27–2): 131–150. doi:10.3406/annor.1977.5222.
- Delacampagne, Florence (1990). Le Calvados. Carte archéologique de la Gaule (in French). Paris: Éditions de la Maison des sciences de l'homme. ISBN 2-87754-011-1.
- Delaval, Éric (2004). "Vieux / Aregenua (Calvados)" [Old / Aregenua (Calvados)]. Capitales éphémères. Des capitales de cités perdent leur statut dans l'Antiquité tardive. Actes du colloque Tours 6-8 mars 2003 [Ephemeral capitals. Capital cities lose their status in late antiquity. Proceedings of the symposium held in Tours on March 6–8, 2003.]. Supplément à la Revue archéologique du Centre de la France (in French). Fédération pour l'édition de la revue archéologique du Centre de la France. pp. 497–500. ISBN 2-913272-10-X.
- Deniaux, Élisabeth (2002). "La Conquête et l'intégration à l'empire romain" [The conquest and integration into the Roman Empire]. La Normandie avant les Normands [Normandy before the Normans] (in French). Rennes: Ouest-France. ISBN 2-7373-1117-9.
- Van Effenterre, Henri (1956). "Restaurations gallo-romaines à l'Université de Caen" [Gallo-Roman restorations at the University of Caen]. Annales de Normandie (in French) (6–1): 41–46.
- Groud-Coudray, Claude (2007). La Normandie gallo-romaine [Gallo-Roman Normandy] (in French). Cully: OREP éditions. ISBN 978-2-915762-18-1.
- Jardel, Karine; Lelièvre, Jean-Yves; Rican, Sidonie (2021). Vieux-la-Romaine (in French). Bayeux: OREP éditions. ISBN 978-2-8151-0620-7.
- Jardel, Karine; Quévillon, Sophie; Germain-Vallée, Cécile; Jeanne, Laurence; Paez-Rézendé, Laurent; Schütz, Grégory (2015). "Le sous-sol des villes antiques de Basse-Normandie exploré par la géophysique : les exemples de Bayeux (14), Fontaine-les-Bassets (61), Valognes (50) et Vieux (14)" [The underground world of ancient towns in Lower Normandy explored using geophysics: examples from Bayeux (14), Fontaine-les-Bassets (61), Valognes (50), and Vieux (14)]. Aremorica. Études sur l'ouest de la Gaule romaine (in French). 7 (7): 7–35. doi:10.3406/aremo.2015.912.
- Pilet, Christian (1984). "Vieux antique (Araegenuae, Viducasses)" [Old antique (Araegenuae, Viducasses)]. Revue archéologique de l'Ouest (in French). 1 (1): 63–84. doi:10.3406/rao.1984.861.
- Royo, Manuel (2006). Rome et l'architecte. Conception et esthétique du plan-relief de Paul Bigot [Rome and the architect. Design and aesthetics of Paul Bigot's relief map] (in French). Caen: Presses universitaires de Caen. ISBN 2-84133-239-X.
- Vipard, Pascal (2002). La cité d'Aregenua (Vieux, Calvados), chef-lieu des Viducasses. État des connaissances [The city of Aregenua (Vieux, Calvados), capital of the Viducasses. Current knowledge] (in French). Château-Gonthier: Exé productions. ISBN 2-913993-05-2.
- Vipard, Pascal (2006). "Un exemple d'échec urbain en Gaule Lyonnaise : Aregenua, chef-lieu des Viducasses (Vieux, Calvados)" [An example of urban failure in Gallia Lyonensis: Aregenua, capital of the Viducasses (Vieux, Calvados)]. Les villes normandes au Moyen Âge [Norman towns in the Middle Ages]. Symposia (in French). Caen: Presses universitaires de Caen. pp. 29–44. ISBN 978-2-84133-810-8.

=== Works on Thorigny marble ===
- Benoist, Stéphane (2006). "Le marbre de Thorigny, une œuvre au clair" [Thorigny marble, a work of clarity]. H.-G. Pflaum. un historien du XXe siècle [H.-G. Pflaum. A historian of the 20th century.]. Hautes études du monde gréco-romain (in French). Geneva: Droz. pp. 285–303. ISBN 2-600-01099-8.
- Besnier, Maurice (1913). Les origines de l'inscription de Torigny [The origins of the Torigny inscription] (in French). BACTH. pp. 21–50.
- Carcopino, Jérôme (1948). "Le marbre de Thorigny" [Thorigny marble]. Revue des Études Anciennes (in French). 50 (27–2): 336–347. doi:10.3406/rea.1948.3410.
- Deniaux, Élisabeth (1999). "Recherches récentes autour du marbre de Thorigny" [Recent research on Thorigny marble]. Annales de Normandie (in French). 49 (1): 81–83. doi:10.3406/annor.1999.1204.
- Harmand, Louis (1965). "La restauration du "marbre" de Thorigny" [Restoration of the "marble" of Thorigny]. Bulletin de la société nationale des antiquaires de France (in French). 1963 (1963): 100–101. doi:10.3406/bsnaf.1965.6932.
- Héron de Villefosse, Antoine (1889). "Le marbre de Vieux" [The marble of Vieux]. Bulletin Monumental (in French). 55: 514–534.
- Lambert, Édouard (1833). "Mémoire sur un piédestal antique en marbre, trouvé dans le XVIe siècle à Vieux près Caen, et connu sous le nom de Marbre de Thorigny" [Memoir on an antique marble pedestal, found in the 16th century in Vieux near Caen, and known as the Thorigny Marble.]. Mémoires de la Société des Antiquaires de Normandie (in French): 320–361.
- Pelletier, André (1993). "Thorigny (marbre dit de)" [Thorigny (marble known as)]. La civilisation gallo-romaine de A à Z [The Gallo-Roman civilization from A to Z]. Galliæ Civitates (in French). Lyon: Presses Universitaires de Lyon. pp. 204–205. ISBN 2-7297-0472-8.
- Pelletier, André (1993a). "Sollemnis". La civilisation gallo-romaine de A à Z [The Gallo-Roman civilization from A to Z]. Galliæ Civitates (in French). Lyon: Presses Universitaires de Lyon. p. 196. ISBN 2-7297-0472-8.
- Pflaum, Hans-Georg (1948). Le marbre de Thorigny [Thorigny marble]. Bibliothèque de l'École des hautes études. Sciences historiques et philologiques, 4e section (in French). Paris: Honoré Champion.
- Stein, Arthur (1957). "Le marbre de Thorigny" [Thorigny marble]. Listy filologické / Folia philologica (in French). 80 (1): 1–7. JSTOR 23460488.
- Vipard, Pascal (2008). Marmor Tauriniacum : le marbre de Thorigny (Vieux, Calvados). La carrière d'un grand notable gaulois au début du troisième siècle ap. J.-C [Marmor Tauriniacum: Thorigny marble (Vieux, Calvados). The quarry of a prominent Gaul in the early third century AD]. Gallia Romana (in French). Paris: De Boccard. ISBN 978-2-7018-0243-5.
