= Legio II Augusta =

Roman legion

Second Legion Augusta
- Legio II Augusta; Legio Secunda Augusta
- Map of the Roman Empire in AD 125, under emperor Hadrian, showing the Legio II Augusta, stationed at Isca Silurum (Caerleon, Wales), in Britannia province, from AD 74 to at least 269
- Active: 43 BC to sometime in the 4th century AD
- Country: Roman Republic and Roman Empire
- Type: Roman legion (Marian)
- Role: Infantry assault (some cavalry support)
- Size: Varied over unit lifetime. Approx. 3,500 fighting men + support at the time of creation.
- Garrison/HQ: Hispania Tarraconensis (25 BC - AD 9); Germania (9 - 17); Argentoratum (17-43); Britannia (43-269); Glevum (66-74); Isca Augusta (Caerleon) (74 - c. 208); Carpow (c. 208-c. 235); Isca Augusta (235 - after 255)
- Nicknames: Augusta, "Augustan" under Augustus; Antonina, "Antoninian" under Caracalla or Elagabalus
- Patron: Augustus
- Mascots: Capricornus, in its sea-goat form the astrological sign of II Augusta's patron, Augustus
- Engagements: Philippi (42 BC); Perugia (41 BC-40 BC); Cantabrian Wars (25 BC-19 BC); Invasion of Britain (43-66); Severus Scottish campaign (208)

Commanders
- Notable commanders: Vespasian (commander); Septimius Severus (campaign); Tiberius Claudius Paulinus

Legio II Augusta (lit. Second Legion "Augustus'") was a legion of the Imperial Roman army that was founded during the late Roman Republic. Its emblems were the Capricornus, Pegasus, and Mars. It may have taken the name "Augusta" from a victory or reorganization that occurred during the reign of Augustus.

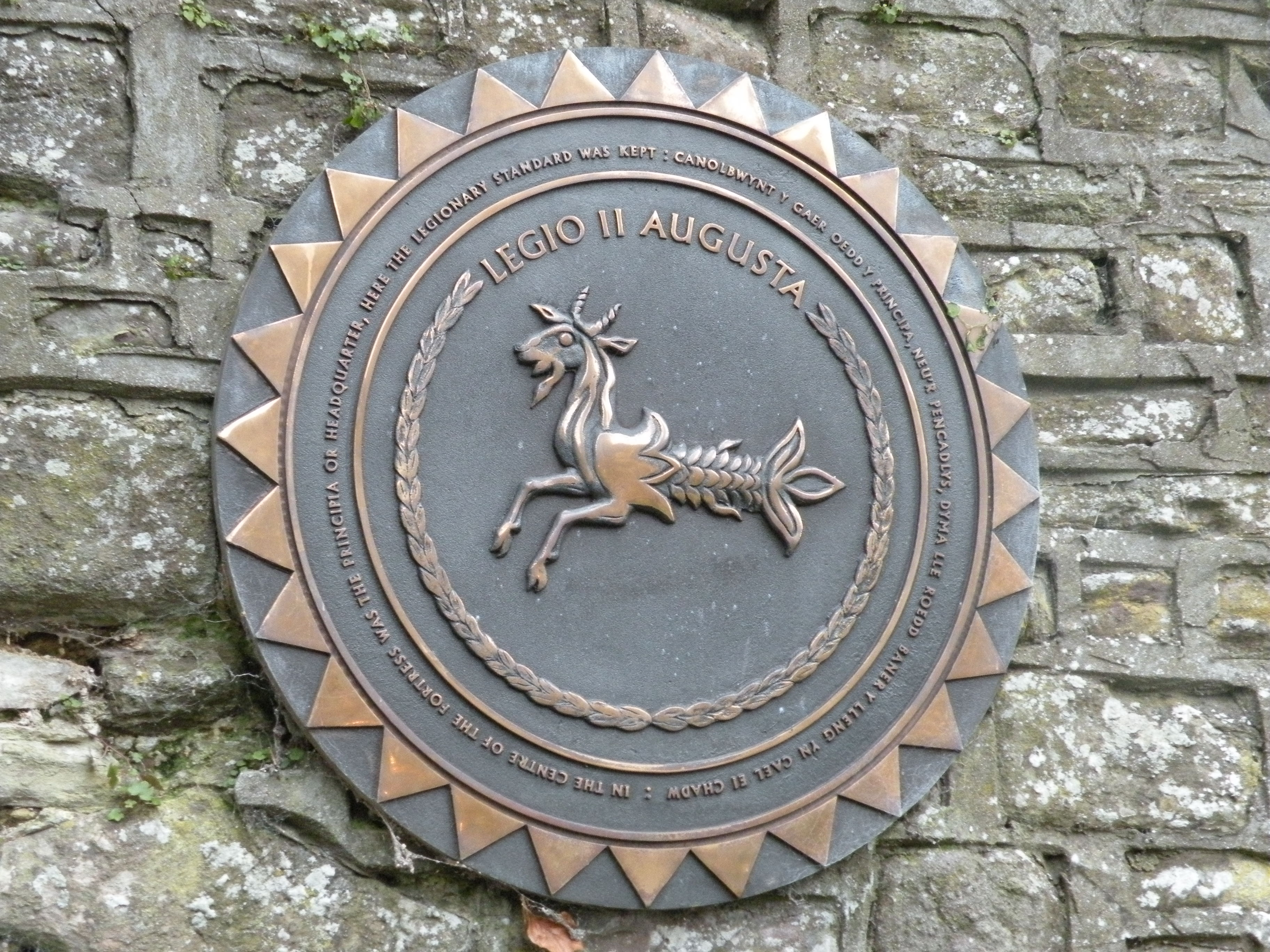
One of the emblems used was the Capricornus

== In Republican service ==
The Legio II, Sabina was a Roman military unit of the late Republican era, which may have been formed by Julius Caesar in the year of the consulate of 48 BC and coincide, in this case, with the Legio II. Enlisted to fight against Pompey, they took part in the subsequent Battle of Munda of 45 BC.

Alternatively it could be the Legio II, formed by the consul, Gaius Vibius Pansa in 43 BC and recruited in Sabina, hence its nickname. If this theory is true, then it probably participated in the subsequent battle of Philippi of 42 BC on the side of the triumvirate, Octavian and Marc Antony.

After the defeat of the Republicans, Legio II swore allegiance to Octavian and with the same remained until the Battle of Actium of 31 BC, after which it seems to have been dissolved in the years between 30 and 14 BC (sent on leave were between 105,000 and 120,000 veterans) and some of its soldiers may have been integrated into the new Legio II Augusta.

== In Imperial service ==
=== Hispania ===
At the beginning of Augustus' rule, in 26 BC, this legion was relocated to a place north of Hispania Tarraconensis, to fight in the Cantabrian Wars. This war would definitively establish Roman power in Hispania. While the legion was in Hispania, they along with the Legio I Germanica helped build the Colonia Acci. They also constructed the city of Cartenna.

=== Germania and Gaul ===
With the annihilation of several legions at the Battle of the Teutoburg Forest, the Legio II Augusta moved to Germania, possibly in the area of Moguntiacum. While in Germania, during the 15 AD the legion would participate in the campaigns of Germanicus against the Germanic tribes. After Germanicus was recalled the legion was stationed at Argentoratum. On its way back from Germania, the legion was drenched in heavy rain and harassed by heavy storms. After Julius Sacrovir and Julius Florus revolted against the Roman Empire in Gaul, the Legio II Augusta, under the command of Gaius Silius would help put down the revolt.

=== Britain ===
==== Invasion of Britannia and Boudica's revolt ====
The legion was one of the four legions used during Claudius's invasion of Britannia. The commander of the Legion at the time was Vespasian. He led the campaign against the Durotriges and Dumnonii tribes. During the campaign the Legion marched across the south of Britain, fighting many battles against the local tribes.

The Legion was first stationed at Alchester and in 49 AD it was probably moved to the Fort at Lake Farm, and then Bradford Abbas. Small forts were established at Hod Hill till AD 50 then Waddon Hill until AD 60. From 55 it was based at Exeter and from 66 it was possibly at Glevum.

During the uprising of queen Boudica, its praefectus castrorum Poenius Postumus, who was then its acting commander (possibly because its legatus and tribunes were with the governor Suetonius Paulinus), contravened Suetonius' orders to join him and so later committed suicide.

==== Year of the Four Emperors ====
In 69 CE, during the Year of the Four Emperors, a vexillation of the Legio II Augusta sided with emperor Otho. After Otho was defeated the vexillation switched sides and served Vitellius. This vexillation possibly took part in Vetellius's march on Rome, and fought in the Battle at Cremona against the legions of Otho. Later these soldiers were defeated by those of Vespasian and returned to Britain in 70. It is possible that the main body of the legion had always been loyal towards Vespasian.

==== Continued service in Britain ====
Julius Frontinus, the governor of Britain from 74 to 78 ordered several campaigns against the Silures tribe and during the war the fortress of Caerleon in Wales was constructed where from 75 the legion was based. The legion remained there, even during Agricola's term as governor of Britain although several vexillations of the Legio II Augusta fought in the Battle of Mons Graupius.

In 139 the Legion helped build the short lived Antonine Wall. During the years 155 and 158 a revolt spread across Britain, the Legio II Augusta was one of those that fought against the revolt. The legions in Britain suffered greatly, causing reinforcements from the Germanic provinces to be brought over.

In 196 Decimus Clodius Albinus, governor of Britain, declared himself emperor and the Legio II Augusta supported his claim. The legions were defeated by the current emperor, Septimus Severus. However, while the legions were absent from Britain, the province was overrun with Pictish tribes. Emperor Severus attempted to conquer Scotland in order to stop the tribes, while Severus was fighting the Picts, Legio II Augusta was stationed at a fort near Carpow. It is unknown when, but the II Augusta received the surname Antonina, which meant that the soldiers were particularly dear to the emperor. This happened either under Caracalla or Heliogabalus,

During Severus Alexanders reign as emperor of Rome, the conquests in Scotland were given up and the Second Legion returned to Caerleon. The legion was still there in 255. The last known mention of the Legion was the Notitia Dignitatum which places the legion at Richborough, suggesting Caerleon was abandoned.

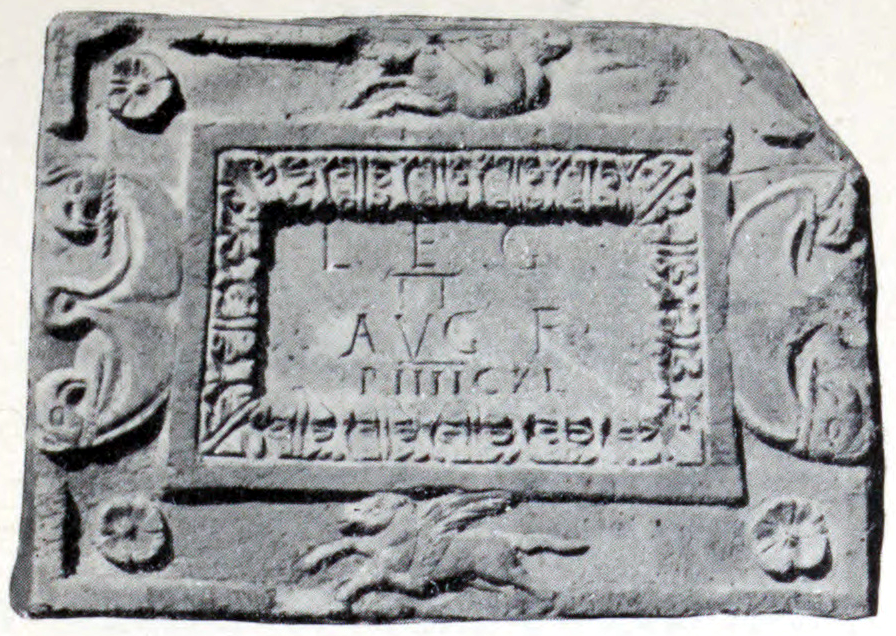
RIB 2203. Distance Slab of the Second Legion found near Duntocher. George MacDonald calls in no. 12 in the 2nd edition of his book The Roman Wall in Scotland. It has been scanned and a video produced.

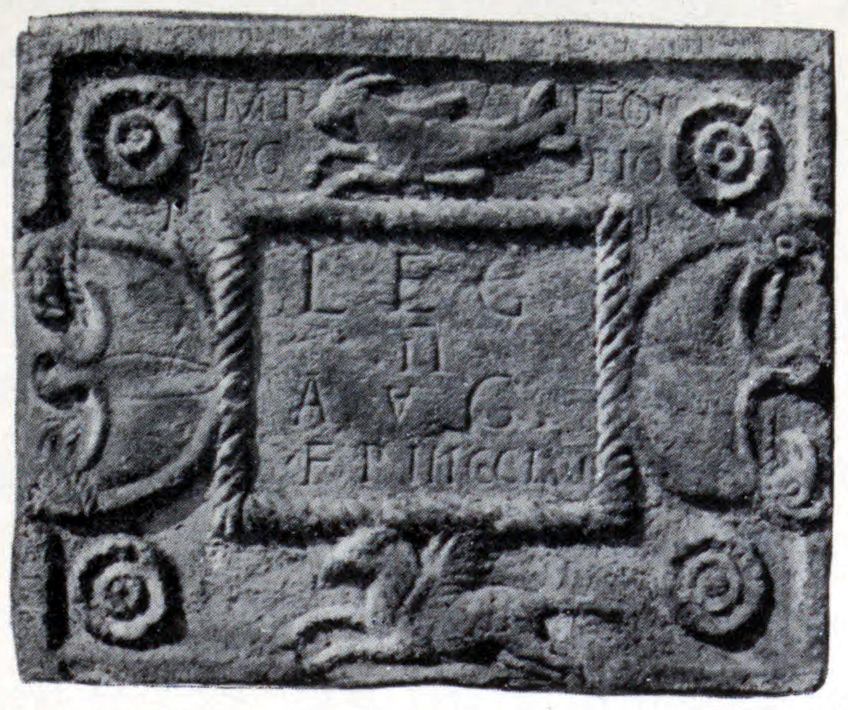
RIB 2204. Distance Slab of the Second Legion George MacDonald calls in no. 14 in the 2nd edition of his book The Roman Wall in Scotland. It has been scanned and a video produced.

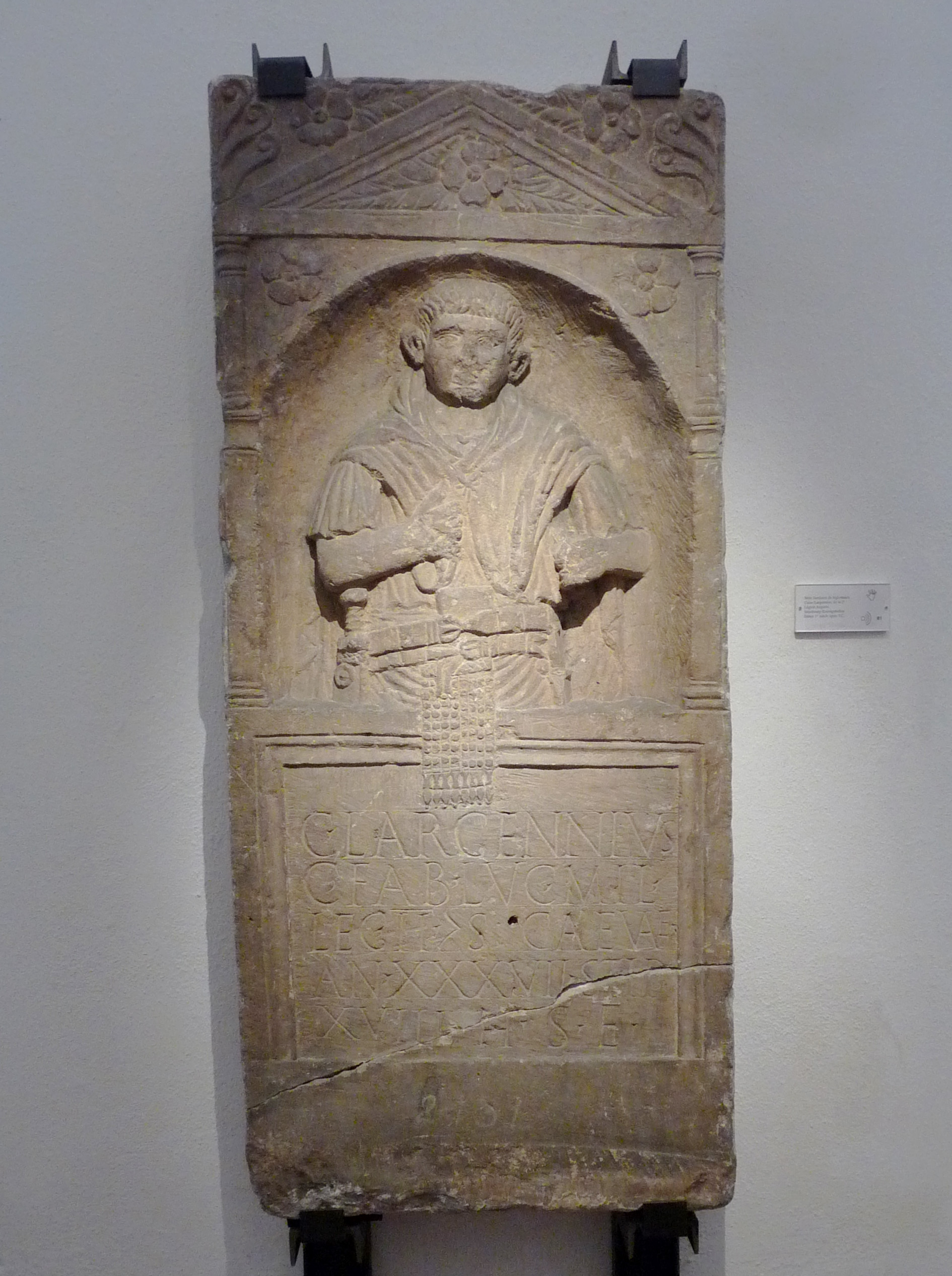
Funerary stele of Caius Largennius a soldier from Lucca, Etruria found in Strasbourg
(Musée archéologique de Strasbourg)

== Attested members ==
Name	Rank	Time frame	Province	Soldier located in	Veteran located in	Source
Caius Largennius	miles	1st century	Germania	Argentoratum ?	Argentoratum	
Gaius Caetronius Miccio	legatus legionis	c. 34–36	Germania Superior			CIL II, 2423
Lucius Antistius Rusticus	tribunus	c. 69	Britannia			AE 1925, 126
Gnaeus Julius Agricola	tribunus	58-61	Britannia			
Gaius Fabius Agrippinus	tribunus	before 140	Britannia			AE 1955, 174
Publius Septimius Geta	tribunus	c. 170s	Britannia			
Julius Marcellinus	centurio	122-300	Britannia	Banna		
Poenius Postumus	praefectus castrorum	AD 60–61	Britannia	Glevum	Committed suicide out of shame following the battle of watling street.	Tacitus The Annals. 4.12; 14.37
Titus Flavius Vespasianus	legatus legionis	AD 42-47	Britannia	Italy	Rome	Suetonius Vesp. 4; Tacitus Hist. III 44; Josephius Bell. Jud. III 12
Aulus Larcius Priscus	legatus legionis	between 97 and 105	Britannia			CIL VIII, 17881
Aulus Claudius Charax	legatus legionis	c. 141-c. 144	Britannia			AE 1961, 320
Fronto Aemilianus Calpurnius Rufilanus	legatus legionis	161/169 or 177/180	Britannia			CIL VII, 98 = RIB 320
Quintus Aurelius Polus Terentianus	legatus legionis	between 185 and 190	Britannia			AE 1965, 240
Lucius Julius Julianus	legatus legionis	end 2nd century	Britannia			CIL XI, 4182,CIL VII, 480
Tiberius Claudius Paulinus	legatus legionis	early 3rd century	Britannia			CIL XIII, 3162
Vitulasius Laetinianus	legatus legionis	between 253 and 259	Britannia			CIL VII, 107
Titus Flavius Postumius Varus	legatus legionis	3rd century	Britannia			CIL VII, 95
Lucius Valerius Geminus		AD 43-66	Britannia		Alchester	
Flavius Quadratus	aquilifer	1st century BCE	Hispania	Olisipo		CIL II, 266 = HEp 11, 2001
Titus Flavius Rufus	centurio	2nd century	Italia, Moesia, Dacia		Dacia	CIL XI, 20 = ILS 2082, CIL III, 00971

== In popular culture ==
- In his fantasy novel Grail, the author Stephen R. Lawhead states that the legion was ensnared by the black magic of the witch Morgan le Fay, doomed to perpetually wander the mists of Lyonesse.
- Lindsey Davis' character Marcus Didius Falco and his best friend Lucius Petronius Longus both served in the legion during Boadicea's Revolt in AD 60/61, while they were teenagers (probably 19–20 years old). Marcus and Lucius only refer to their service in asides, due to the bad memories of the Revolt and the boredom in a cold, unfriendly country. The scenes of carnage and destruction in Londinium left a deep impression on both of them, with neither keen to return to Britannia. Their internal references also hint that their disgraced prefect, Postumius, did not commit suicide, but instead was executed by the legionaries for his refusal to march to Governor Suetonius's aid during the Revolt, but the legionaries swore an oath never to speak of this to outsiders. Novels that most directly refer to their service in Britain are The Silver Pigs, The Iron Hand of Mars, A Body in the Bath House and The Jupiter Myth.
- It is also the Legion in which Optio Quintus Licinius Cato and Centurion Lucius Cornelius Macro serve during the first five books of the Eagles of the Empire series by Simon Scarrow. The books also cover Vespasian's career as commander of the legion and the invasion of Britain.
- The story of the legion's role in Boadicea's Revolt and the subsequent suicide of its acting commander features in Imperial Governor, George Shipway's 1968 novel about Gaius Suetonius Paulinus.
- The II Legion features in Adrian Goldsworthy's novel series, beginning with Vindolanda, about a fictitious centurion of the legion.

== See also ==
- List of Roman legions
- Roman legion
