= Caius Largennius =

Roman legionary

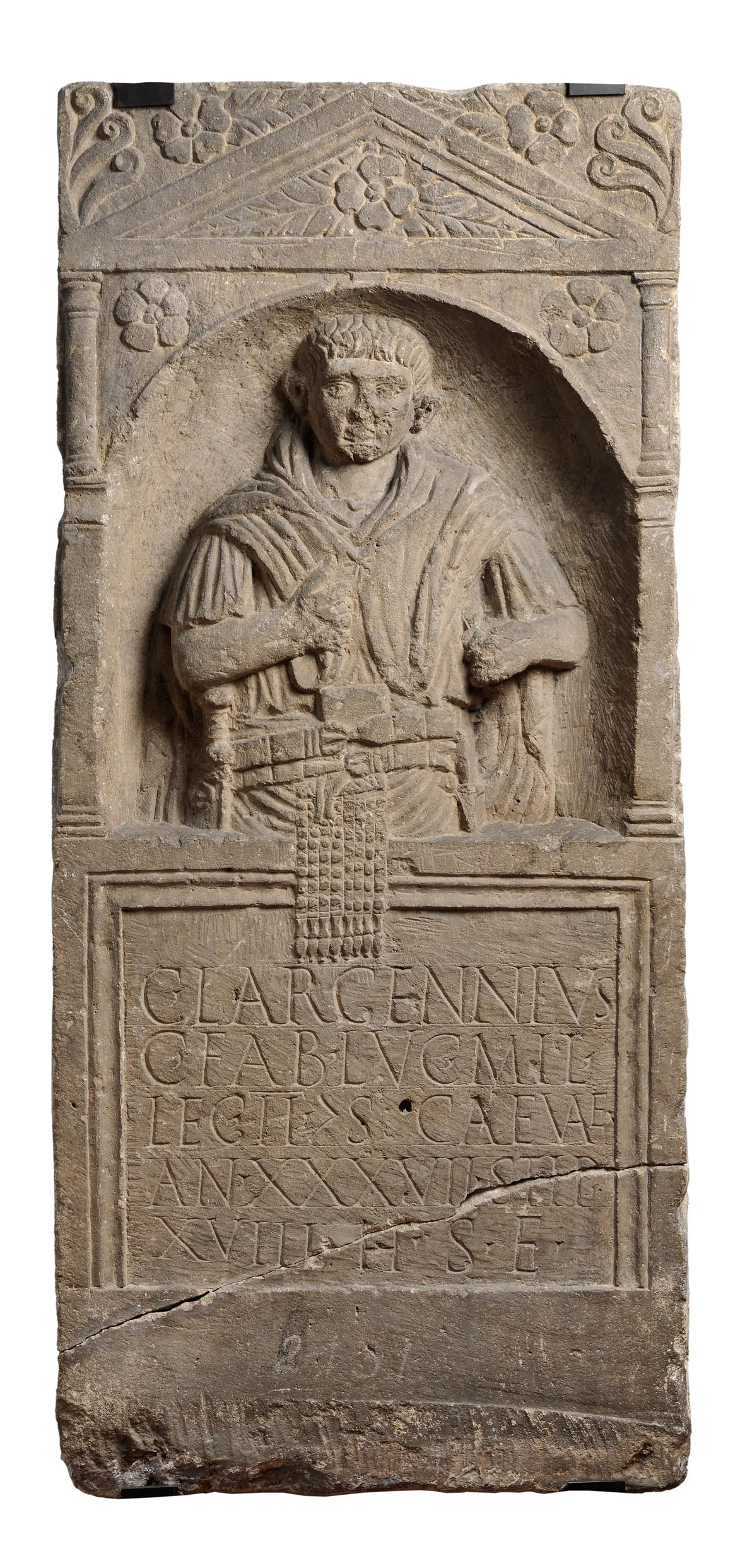
Caius Largennius

Caius Largennius (died c. AD 50) was a legionary of the Legio II Augusta. He was born in Lucca and stationed in Argentoratum. His funerary stele, discovered in 1878 in the Strasbourg district of Koenigshoffen, has been much studied and is well documented. It is now kept in the Musée archéologique de Strasbourg.

== Funerary stele ==
The limestone stele was found at the current address 27–29, route des Romains, 48°34′47″N 7°43′06″E. Its style has been described as "confident and extrovert", the pose of the legionary as "relaxed". The dimensions have been given as:

- height 147 cm (58 in)
- width 67 cm (26 in)
- depth 20 cm (7.9 in)

or, more recently, as:

- height 150 cm (59 in)
- width 67 cm (26 in)
- depth 21 cm (8.3 in)

According to an Italian expert, col. Vittorio Lino Biondi, the "costly" design of the stele and the fact that Largennius is represented only with light armament indicate that he was not a "first line soldier" but a runner, whose importance and reliability must have been considerable. Largennius is indeed depicted only with a gladius (sword) and a pugio (dagger), and his left hand is holding a parchment roll.

The inscription on the stele reads: C. LARGENNIUS/ C. FAB. LUC. MIL./ LEG. II SCAEVAE/ AN. XXXVII STIP./ XVIII H.S.E.; which is transcribed as: Caius Largennius Caii Fabia Luca miles legionis II scaevae annorum XXXVII stipendiorum XVIII hic situs est, i. e. "Caius Largennius, son of Caius, of the roman tribe Fabia from Lucca. A soldier of the Scaeva century of the II legion. He died aged 37 after 18 years of service. His resting place is here."

A replica of the stele has been set up in Strasbourg, on a square inaugurated in 2009 and named after the legionary (Square Caius Largennius). Another replica was unveiled on 24 March 2017 in Lucca, where the "return of the first Lucchese in the world" (Il primo Lucchese nel mondo torna a casa) was greeted with an official ceremony and a public celebration on Piazza San Michele.
