= Poenius Postumus =

1st century AD Roman soldier and legion prefect

Poenius Postumus was praefectus castrorum (camp prefect) of the Roman legion II Augusta, stationed in Britain during the rebellion of Boudica in 61 AD. In this position he would have been in charge of all administrative, training and equipment matters, and would also have been acting commander of the legion in the absence of its two most senior officers: the legate (legatus) and the senior military tribune (tribunus laticlavius).

In the general area of Exeter with his troops, Poenius Postumus ignored the call to join the governor, Gaius Suetonius Paulinus, in putting down the rebellion. Hearing of the Roman defeat of Boudica, and having denied his troops a share in the glory, he fell on his sword.

The II Augusta are known to have been based at Exeter in Devon. The praefectus castrorum or camp prefect was normally promoted from the ranks, and was third-in-command of a legion's command structure. In this case, the decision whether to move the troops to help put down the rebellion fell to Postumus, implying that the legate and the senior tribune were unavailable, possibly in poor health or acting as members of Suetonius Paulinus's staff during the campaign on the island of Anglesey, which preceded the revolt.
