= Alchester =

Roman settlement in England

- Location within Oxfordshire
- 51.877537°N 1.170986°W
- Type: Settlement
- Location: Alchester
- Region: Britannia

Alchester is the site of an ancient Roman town. The site is not included in any ancient references; hence, the Roman name is not known. However, Eilert Ekwall contended that it appears as Alavna in the Ravenna Cosmography, with the addition of the Old English ceaster to signify a Roman fort. It lies about 2 miles (3 km) south of Bicester, in the northwest corner of the civil parish of Wendlebury in the English county of Oxfordshire.

Alchester had a strategic location in Roman Britain at a crossroads on the Silchester–Dorchester on Thames–Towcester road and the Cirencester–St Albans road (Akeman Street). Recent excavations have shown that it was the site of one of the earliest legionary fortresses in Roman Britain after the invasion of 43 AD.

The site has been the subject of investigation since 1996, firstly under the auspices of Oxford University Archaeological Society, then under those of the University of Leicester and the University of Edinburgh.

== History ==
Archaeology has revealed that there was an Iron Age settlement close to the later Roman town, and that Roman occupation of the site began in the Claudian period in the form of a fort soon after the invasion of Britain in 43 AD.

=== Military phase ===
From the time of the Roman invasion Alchester was in a strategic position in the border region of the Catuvellauni and Dobunni tribes, and in an ideal position to exercise control over wide areas.

During the first few years after the invasion, a large legionary fortress of the Legio II Augusta commanded by Vespasian was built here. Alchester was situated behind the early military front line of the Fosse Way in an ideal position as a supply base.

After the conquest of most of the rest of Roman Britain, the legion moved to Exeter before AD 68 and abandoned the fortress.

=== Civilian era ===
The town continued to grow, helped by its location at a road junction. Walls were built around the town during the turbulent times of the late 3rd century.

After the 5th century the place was deserted.

== Archaeology ==
=== The Legionary Fortress ===
Playing-card-shaped enclosures with ditches were shown on aerial photographs taken in 1943–45. Excavations in 1990 focussed initially on the Roman military enclosure near and under the later Roman town, and then on its fortified annex. This proved that the larger enclosure was surrounded by an army-style V-shaped ditch, characteristic of a fort.

The spread in time and frequency of early objects and the buildings shows that the fort was more substantial than a vexillation camp, and existed for a longer time than a temporary camp for use only during the invasion.

Investigation of the gate of the annex revealed two wooden gateposts preserved in waterlogged conditions; dendrochronology gives each of them a felling date of between October AD 44 and March AD 45. The main fortress must have been built earlier, probably in the year of invasion, 43 AD.

The smaller enclosure, with its U-shaped ditch and square corners was atypical for Roman forts, and was interpreted as a parade ground. Parallels for this have been found associated with legionary fortress of Lambaesis (Algeria), as well as at Tomen y Mur (Gwynedd). The presence of this would also support the idea of a fairly permanent military base.

The discovery in 2003 of smashed fragments of the tombstone of Lucius Valerius Geminus, a veteran of the Legio II Augusta is significant in that it shows he retired from the legion while stationed at Alchester even though he came from north-west Italy and lived in the vicinity until his death. The fortress must have been well-established and probably associated with a nearby vicus.

The inscription reads:

Dis Manibus/ L(ucius) Val(erius) L(uci filius) Pol(lia tribu) Gemi/nus For(o) ♠Germ(anorum)/ vet(eranus) Leg(ionis) [I]I Aug(ustae)/ an(norum) L h(ic) s(itus) e(st)/ he(res) c(uravit)/ e(x) t(estamento)

"To the souls of the departed: Lucius Valerius Geminus, the son of Lucius, of the Pollia voting tribe, from Forum Germanorum, veteran of the Second Augustan Legion, aged 50(?), lies here. His heir had this set up in accordance with his will."

The size of the fort at 14-15ha including the annex is larger than that estimated for the previous fortress of Legio II Augusta at Strasbourg. Other finds also support the conclusion that this was its legionary fortress soon after invasion of Britain and before it moved to Exeter, and that its commander Vespasian was located here rather than in southern England at this time.

Evidence from coins found at the site suggest abandonment was likely to have taken place before the death of Emperor Nero in AD 68.

=== The Town ===
Outside the western defences, excavation in 1766 of what was then a prominent mound known as the Castle uncovered a sizable Roman bath.

Excavations in 2003 of the town wall near the west gate showed this had been robbed of building stone in post-Roman times, except for two stones that were found in situ and the wall's rubble foundations.

The area bounded by defences, about 10 hectares (25 acres), is almost square, with the earliest defences consisting of a gravel rampart and one or more ditches; later, a stone wall was added to the rampart. The dating of these two phases is obscure.

The planning of streets approaches a rectangular grid, uncommon in smaller Romano-British towns. Along the main street, aerial archaeology has revealed a number of narrow, rectangular strip buildings. Near the centre of the town lay a building with a central court, surrounded by a portico on three sides.
