= Lucius Julius Julianus =

Roman Praetor

Lucius Julius Julianus was a legatus legionis of the Legio II Augusta and a Roman praetor.

== Biography ==
Lucius Julius Julianus most likely became a legatus two years after he became a praetor. During his commission he fought the Picts in Britain. Julianus was also a proconsul of Achaea between 198 and 211. Sometime after 212 CE he would become governor of Aquitania. Very little of his personal life is known. He lived in Interamna or possibly Oriculum.
