= Gaius Caetronius Miccio =

Roman senator

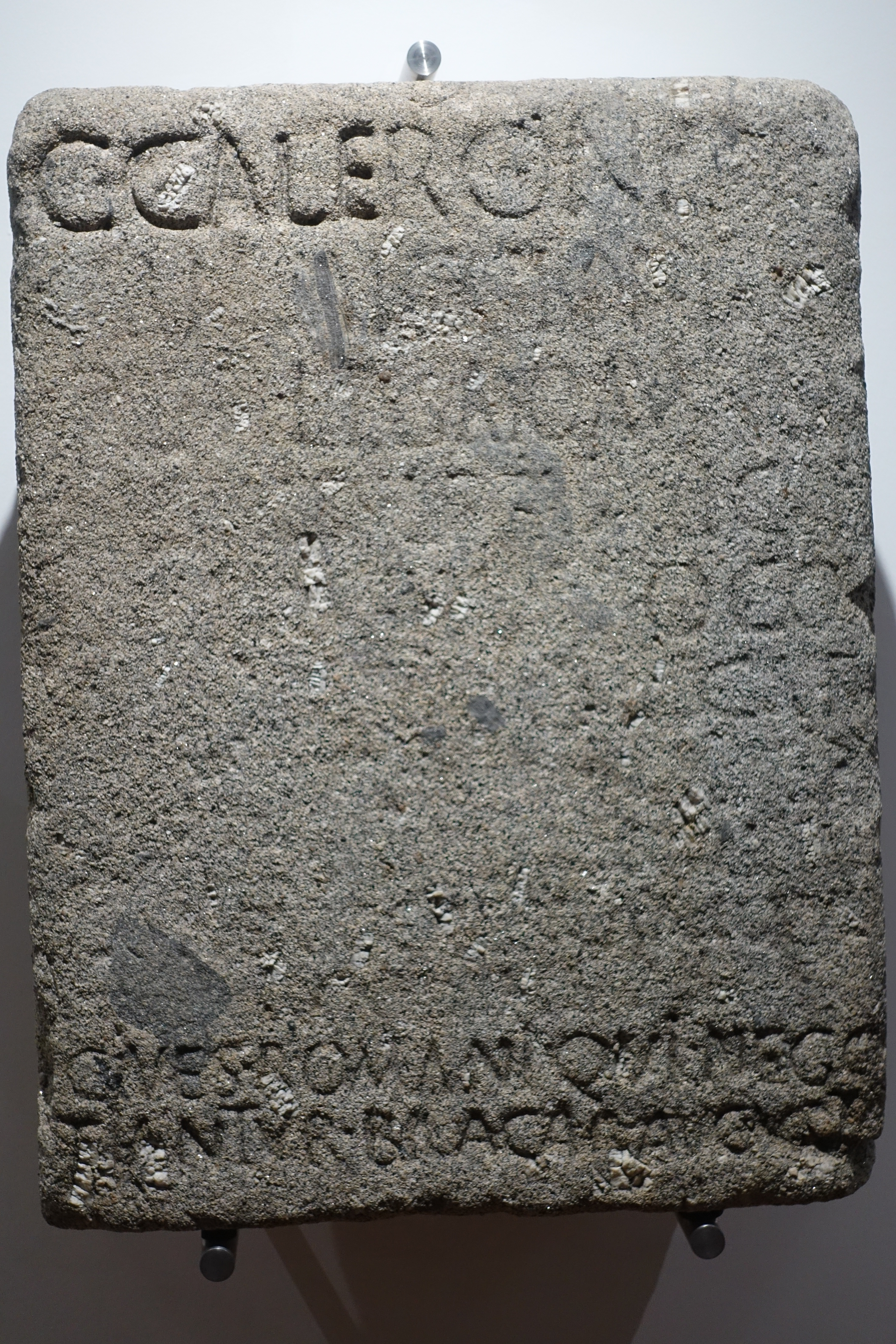
- Honorific inscription CIL II, 2423

Roman senator

Gaius Caetronius Miccio was a Roman senator who flourished during the first century AD. His career up to the point he may have become consul is outlined in an inscription at Braga, Portugal.

== Biography ==
The name Caetronius (emended from 'Caleronius', as it appears on the stone, by Hübner and Alföldy) is Etruscan and the surname Miccio is Celtic, both attested in Italy. His voting tribe was the 'Camilia', a tribe which is attested as associated with only a few towns in Italy. Géza Alföldy thus concludes that Gaius Caetronius Miccio most probably came from Suasa, a town in Umbria inhabited by the Gallic Senones.

Most likely, Gaius Caetronius Miccio was born during the time of Augustus and his career spanned the reigns of Tiberius, Caligula and Claudius. The inscription omits the lower offices of the cursus honorum, such as quaestor and military tribune, that a Senator normally held before the office of plebeian tribune at Rome. This suggests he was probably adlected to the Senate. Mireille Corbier notes that Augustus initiated a measure in AD 12 allowing equites to become candidates for plebeian tribune; she further notes that one Gaius Caetronius was legate of Legio I Germanica in AD 14; while she doubts this Caetronius was his father, she believes he was a close relative who facilitated Miccio's entry into the Senate. Miccio then went on to serve as the emperor's judicial administrator in the province of Hispania Citerior. He afterwards served as commander (legate) of the Legio II Augusta in Germania Superior; Corbier dates this commission to around 35. This was followed as proconsul of the public province of Hispania Baetica; Corbier dates this office to 37/38. Under Caligula, Miccio was appointed prefect of the aerarium militare (military treasury); Corbier, noting this position was usually held for three years, dates his tenure in this appointment as running from 39 to 41. The latest office recorded in this inscription was praefectus reliquorum demandendorum populi Romani, one of three senators that Claudius selected in AD 42 to supervise collection of arrears due to the treasury due from subject peoples of the empire.

Alföldy notes that he may have held further offices, perhaps even the consulship, though the inscription does not record any. Corbier notes that, at the time of her writing, "the consular records are incomplete for the years 44 and 45."
