= Tiberius Claudius Paulinus =

Roman Senator

Tiberius Claudius Paulinus was a was Roman senator of the early third century.

Several inscriptions in Britain preserve details of his cursus honorum. An inscription at Caerwent provides an account of his career. The earliest office Paulinus held was legatus or commander of Legio II Augusta at Caerleon. After an unknown period of time, he was proconsular governor of Gallia Narbonensis for the term 216/217; this was followed by legatus Augusti pro praetor, or governorship of the imperial province of Gallia Lugdunensis around 218. He returned to Roman Britain where he served as legatus Augusti pro praetor of Britannia Inferior in 220.

Anthony Birley notes he is "the only governor Lower Britain recorded outside the province": an official monument, the Marble of Thorigny includes a letter he addressed to his client, Titus Sennius Sollemnis. By October 221, Marius Valerianus succeeded him as governor.
