= Édouard Lambert =

French sports shooter

Personal information
- Born: 1 January 1906 Paris, France
- Died: 18 June 1963 (aged 57)

Sport
- Sport: Sports shooting

Édouard Lambert (1 January 1906 – 18 June 1963) was a French sports shooter. He competed in the 25 m pistol event at the 1936 Summer Olympics.
