= Musée archéologique (Strasbourg) =

Museum in Strasbourg, France

Coordinates: 48°34′52″N 7°45′08″E

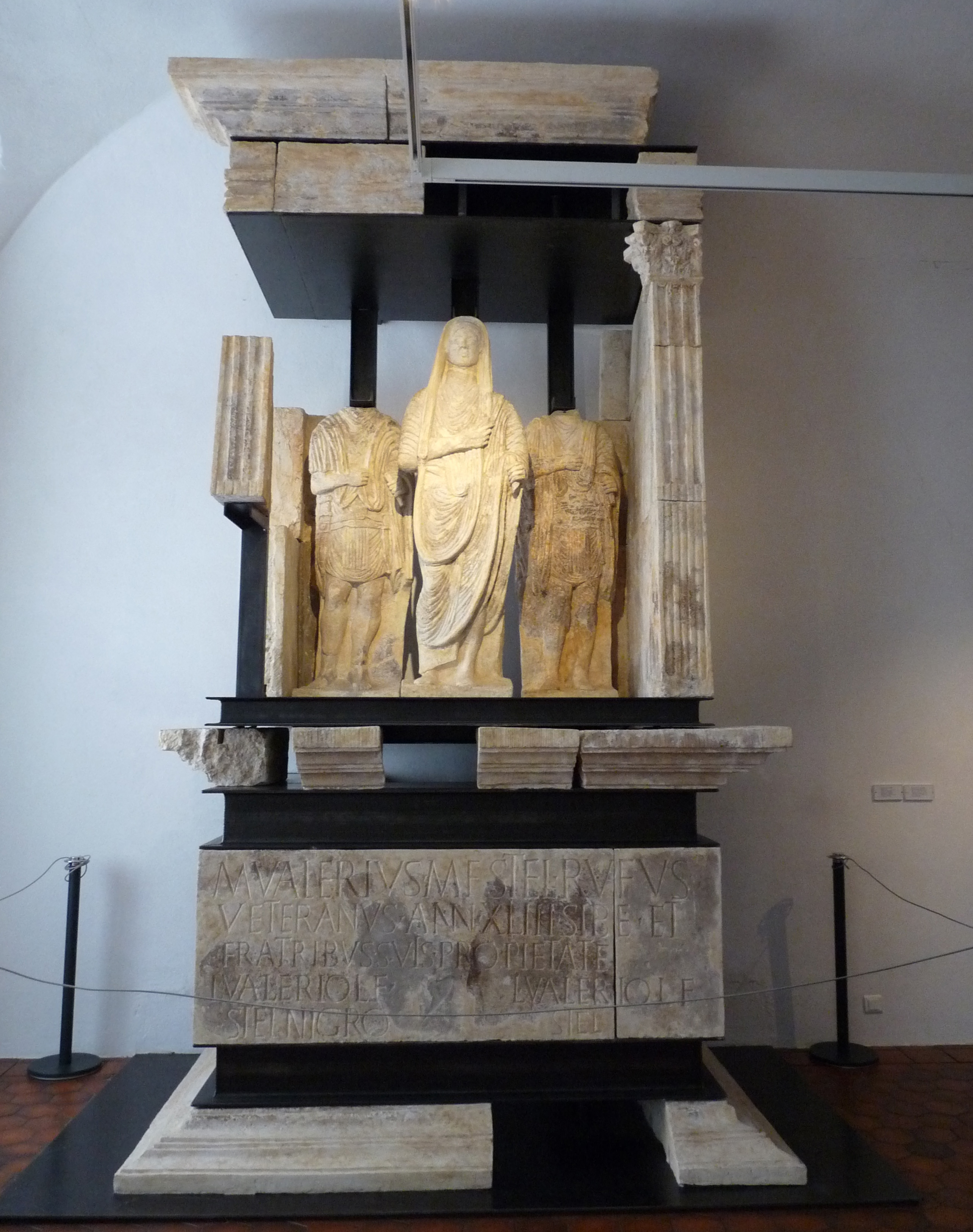
Mausoleum of veteran Marcus Valerius Rufus and his brothers, the legionaries Lucius Valerius Niger and Lucius Valerius (1st century)

The Musée archéologique of Strasbourg, France is the largest of the numerous Alsacian museums displaying regional archeological findings from Prehistory to the Merovingian dynasty. It is located in the basement of the Palais Rohan.

The museum goes back to the legacy of the historian Johann Daniel Schöpflin (1694–1771), who bequeathed his collection to the city of Strasbourg. The Société pour la conservation des monuments historiques d’Alsace (Society for the Conservation of the Historical Monuments of Alsace), founded in 1855, expanded and publicly displayed the municipal collections, of which a large number was however destroyed in 1870, during the Franco-Prussian War. The museum has been located in the basement of the Rohan Castle in Strasbourg since 1889. During the reconstruction of the city and its museums, the musée archéologique moved to the premises that are still currently its own. In the 20th century, longtime directors Robert Forrer and Jean-Jacques Hatt worked on the systematic study of the Alsatian ground and the substantial enlargement of the collection. Between 1988 and 1992, the musée was thoroughly renovated. Its collections continue to grow steadily due to the numerous excavations made in and around Strasbourg since the beginning of the construction of the new Tramway network.

The museum presents an overview of the human habitat in the region beginning with the earliest traces of Human dwelling and settling. A special focus is put on Argentoratum and its outposts along the Rhine like Seltz (Saliso). One of the museums most famous objects is the much studied stele of the legionary Caius Largennius. The museum also displays findings from the Gallo-Roman sanctuaries on the Mont Donon and in Mackwiller, as well as Merovingian findings made around Erstein.
