= Forum of Vieux-la-Romaine =

Archaeological site of the ancient Aregenua in France

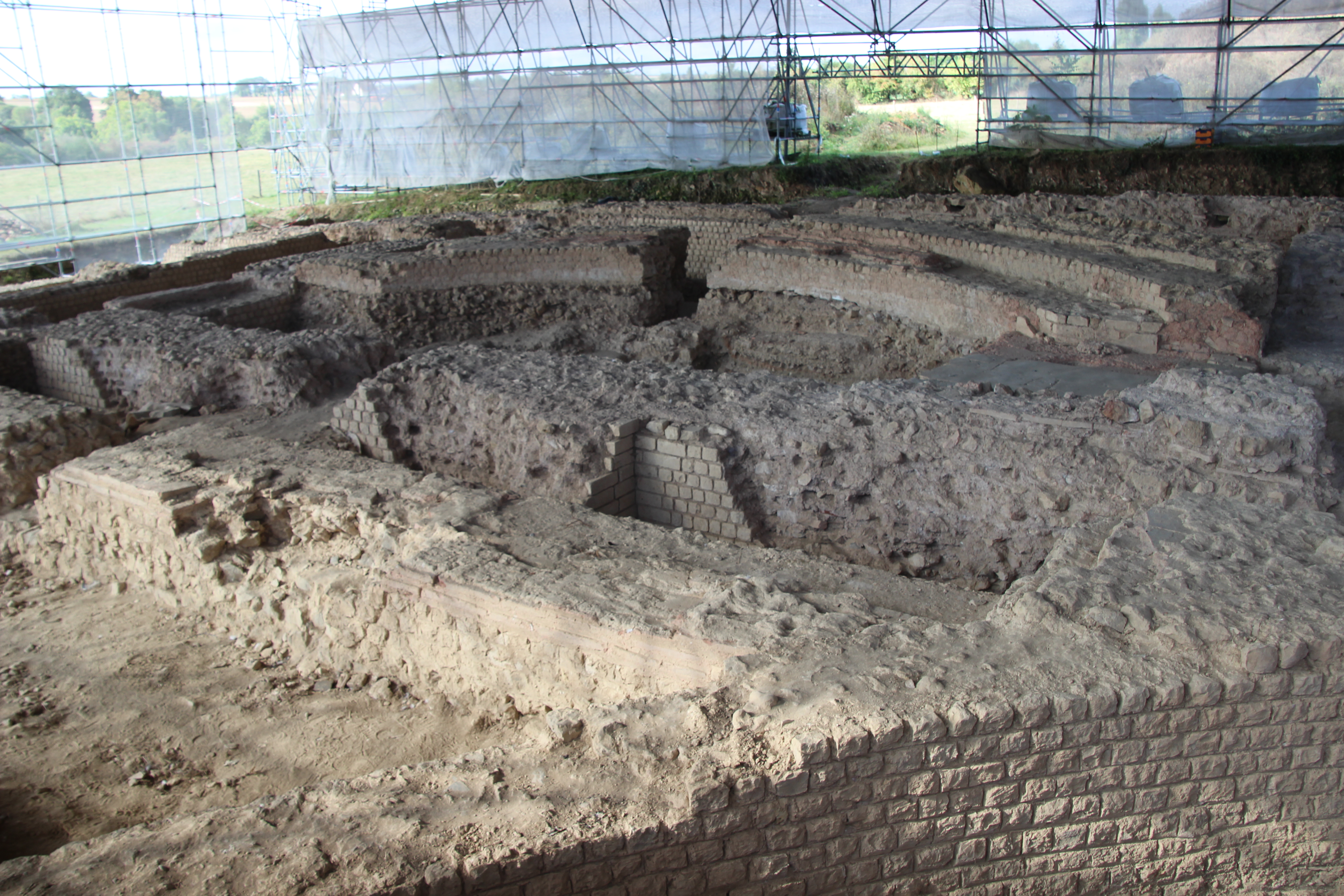
- Remains of the forum of Vieux presented during the 2016 European Heritage Days.
- Interactive map of Forum of Vieux-la-Romaine
- Coordinates: 49°07′40″N 0°25′22″W
- Type: Archaeological site
- Material: Opus sectile in various colors, plaster location=Vieux, Calvados, France
- Width: 115 m × 51.50 m
- Beginning date: Early 2nd century
- Dedicated to: Ancient Rome civilization
- Website: www.vieuxlaromaine.fr

The Gallo-Roman forum of Vieux-la-Romaine belongs to the archaeological site of the ancient Aregenua, situated approximately 11 km (6.8 miles) south of Caen.

As a symbol of a Roman city in Gallia Lugdunensis, the forum was a key site showcasing the process of Romanization. It served as a hub for administrative, judicial, and religious functions, reaching its peak in the 2nd and early 3rd centuries. (Note: Bertin 1977, p. 140) However, the city began to decline in the Crisis of the Third Century due to invasions and the lack of protective walls. (Note: Fichet de Clairefontaine et al. 2004, p. 145) The administrative reorganization of the Western Roman Empire in the early 5th century led to Aregenua losing its status as the capital city, which was transferred to Bayeux.

The forum site has been the focus of archaeological excavations since the 17th century, initiated by the Society of Antiquaries of Normandy. (Note: Jardel, Lelièvre & Mazure 2014, p. 163) The exact location of the forum was a subject of debate until recent research in the late 20th and early 21st centuries confirmed its position. Excavations at Vieux resumed, and, through modern research techniques and traditional archaeological digs spanning nine years, the eastern part of the complex was uncovered.

== Location ==
Location of various Roman buildings in the city of Rome.

The town of Vieux-la-Romaine is situated approximately 11 km (6.8 mi) southwest of Caen and 20 km (12 mi) from the Channel. It is located in the Orne valley and bordered by the La Guigne.

Vieux-la-Romaine is located at the site of the ancient city of Aregenua, a thriving urban center spanning over 2,300 km^{2} (890 square miles) and inhabited by the Viducasses. At the start of this era, the area was densely forested and home to a large population of wild boars. It boasted rich natural resources such as chalk, sandstone, and shale, ideal for construction purposes.

The "Champ des Crêtes" site covers an area of 4 hectares (9.9 acres). In this densely populated area, the dwellings were connected by a "system of streets with facade galleries" and a network of roads dating back to the 2nd century. Two thermae were discovered in the Forum district, with one located just 60 m (200 ft) northeast of the building excavated during the initial dig. One notable domus is the House with the Grand Peristyle.

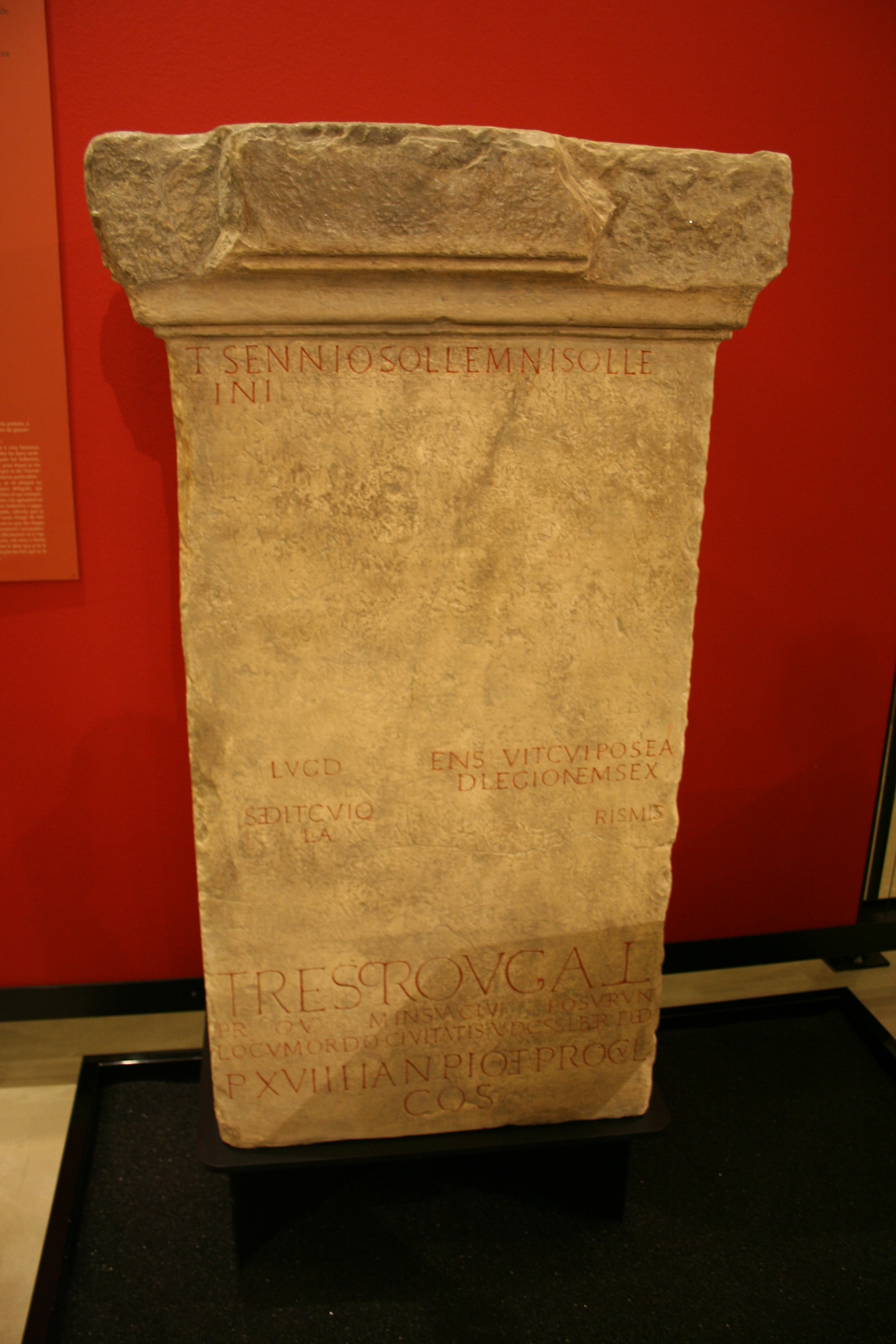
Replica of the marbre de Thorigny plinth at the Vieux-la-Romaine Archaeological Museum, depicting the achievements and philanthropy of Titus Sennius Solemnis.

Not far away is another therma, which was excavated in the 18th and 19th centuries. (Note: Bertin 1977, p. 135) This building, measuring about 90 by 50 m (300 by 160 ft), appears to have been divided between men and women. The baths were donated to the city by the will of Sollemninus at the end of the 2nd century or the beginning of the 3rd century. Sollemninus laid the foundations of the baths, and his son Titus Sennius Solemnis completed the construction in 234 before bequeathing revenues to the city. These baths featured all the amenities of the time, including alternating hot, warm, and cold rooms, gyms, hypocausts, and pools.

Dominique Bertin-Halbout proposed locating the forum between the Church of Saint-Laurent de Vieux and the remains of the baths, at the intersection of the Cardo Maximus and the Decumanus Maximus. (Note: Bertin 1977, p. 138) This hypothesis is supported by archaeological excavations conducted between April and September 1982, which revealed a portion of the forum.

== History ==
=== History of the city ===
Reproduction of an early Christian funerary inscription discovered at Vieux-la-Romaine, dating back to the 5th or 7th centuries. (Note: Fichet de Clairefontaine et al. 2004, pp. 148–149)

The first artifacts found on the site date back to the 1st century BC. The city of Aregenua was founded in the 1st century, likely during the Augustan age, and served as the seat of the Viducasses. (Note: Fichet de Clairefontaine et al. 2004, p. 143) The city flourished under the rule of Roman emperors Tiberius and Claudius, reaching its peak in the 2nd and 3rd centuries. Roman-style public buildings began to appear around 120-140 AD. At its height, the city covered an area of between 30 and 37 hectares (74 and 91 acres), most likely 35 hectares (86 acres), with a population estimated at 5,000. Aregenua enjoyed certain privileges, such as exemption from the land tax owed to Rome (tributum soli) and the granting of the jus Italicum (Latin law), which facilitated its growth. During this period, the city acquired monuments including theaters and thermal baths; domus were also built, such as the House with the Grand Peristyle, dating from the time of the Severan dynasty. (Note: Fichet de Clairefontaine et al. 2004, pp. 145–146) In the 2nd century, the city changed its name to Civitas Viducassium.

A significant turning point in the city's history was its incorporation into the Gallic Empire, as evidenced by the discovery of two dedications to consuls of Postumus, found on an altar dedicated to Mars anf dated to between 263 and 267. In crisis of the Third Century, the city entered a period of decline, with Bayeux gaining prominence. (Note: Fichet de Clairefontaine et al. 2004, p. 142) Just like Jublains, the city did not have a protective wall, which neighboring cities such as Lisieux, Bayeux, and Évreux did. By the mid-3rd century, several districts of the city were abandoned, although some artisans, such as mosaicists, tablet makers, and glassmakers, continued to operate. Archaeological excavations indicate that no new construction took place towards the end of the 3rd century. (Note: Fichet de Clairefontaine et al. 2004, p. 146) In the early 4th century, metallurgical workshops replaced houses near the House with a Grand Peristyle, and roads were renovated and expanded, with a new street cutting through the House with a Grand Peristyle. (Note: Fichet de Clairefontaine et al. 2004, p. 147) The city lost its status as the regional capital around 400, as documented by historical sources.

Between the 5th and 7th centuries, there is limited information available about the city, except for the establishment of Christianity, supported by the discovery of four early Christian funeral inscriptions. (Note: Fichet de Clairefontaine et al. 2004, p. 148) During this time, the city became more ruralized.

During the Merovingian dynasty, the city saw a resurgence, evidenced by the discovery of numerous tombs dating back to the 7th and 8th centuries. However, there was another decline in the Middle Ages, leading to the relocation of inhabitants to a more northern site. Despite continuous habitation, the city did not become a bishopric seat like Bayeux.

Vieux-la-Romaine, capital of the Viducasses people during the High Roman Empire.

Vieux-la-Romaine is no longer the capital of the Viducasses people during the Lower Roman Empire. The city is integrated into the Civitas Baiocassium.

Map of the dioceses of the ecclesiastical province of Rouen in the Early Middle Ages. Aregenua does not appear in this list.

=== History of the forum ===
The forum was constructed in the early 2nd century, underwent modifications in the same century, and further enhancements in the first third of the 3rd century. (Note: Boislève & Jardel 2010, p. 631) During the early 3rd century, the forum decoration was enriched, reflecting "the peak period experienced by the capital".

After a political and administrative shift, the forum was repurposed as a butcher's shop at the end of the 3rd century. (Note: Jardel, Lelièvre & Mazure 2014, p. 185) The territory of the Viducasses' city was partially absorbed by Bayeux.

== Rediscovery ==
=== 16th – 19th centuries ===
The first discoveries on this site date back to the 16th century with the unveiling of the Thorigny Marble. (Note: Jardel, Lelièvre & Mazure 2014, p. 164)

The "Champ des Crêtes" site, spanning 4,000 m^{2} (43,000 square feet)^{(Note: Delaval 2006, p. 217)} and situated near the forum, has undergone multiple excavations. (Note: Bertin 1977, p. 133) The first excavation took place in the 17th century in the southern part of the village, leading to the discovery of ancient and medieval remnants. Subsequently, in 1703, Nicolas-Joseph Foucault, the intendant of the generalité of Caen, conducted further excavations in the area. (Note: Bertin 1977, p. 134)

Subsequent excavations were carried out during various periods between 1839 and 1861, notably by Arcisse de Caumont and Antoine Charma. In 1828, C-A Gervais explored the same area as Intendant Foucault, revealing the baths and the gymnasium. In February and March 1840, François Besongnet and Charles Gervais continued C-A Gervais' work, determining that the forum was situated in another part of the site. Arcisse de Caumont arrived at the site on March 19, 1840, to create plans of the uncovered walls, and discovered the three rows of steps of the Curia. The excavations conducted by the Society of Antiquaries of Normandy under Antoine Charma in 1859 focused on previously excavated buildings, providing precise plans and detailed descriptions of the marble decorations used in the forum. (Note: Jardel, Lelièvre & Mazure 2014, p. 165) However, Antoine Charma's excavations did involve some incorrect interpretations, as he mistakenly identified the decorative frescoes as belonging to the baths rather than a senate building or basilica. A plan was drafted by Georges-Aimar Lavalley-Duperroux at that time, which was only rediscovered in the Calvados departmental archives in 1991.

=== 20th century ===
In the early 20th century, Maurice Besnier, in his book Histoire des fouilles de Vieux, attempted to pinpoint the forum location by analyzing excavations conducted by the Society of Antiquaries of Normandy in the previous century. (Note: Jardel, Lelièvre & Mazure 2014, p. 166)

In 1972, a new archaeological excavation campaign commenced. Two probes measuring 2 by 1 m (6 ft 7 in by 3 ft 3 in) were conducted to analyze the site stratigraphy. These excavations unearthed artifacts dating from the 1st century, during the reigns of Roman emperors Tiberius and Nero, up to the mid-4th century.

In 1977, Christian Pilet continued Maurice Besnier's research and identified two distinct groups of baths, locating the forum in a different area on the site. (Note: Jardel, Lelièvre & Mazure 2014, pp. 166–167) Aerial photographs taken in 1987 and 1989 provided further clarity on the layout of the walls. (Note: Jardel, Lelièvre & Mazure 2014, p. 167) In 1991, Lavalley-Duperroux's plan was discovered in the Calvados departmental archives, enhancing the interpretation of archaeological findings.

=== 21st century ===
In 2005, towed electrical prospecting surveys were conducted to pinpoint the forum location and generate three interpretation maps. (Note: Jardel, Lelièvre & Mazure 2014, pp. 167 and 169)

The Council of Calvados acquired the parcel of Champ des Crêtes shortly before 2006, turning it into an archaeological reserve. (Note: Delaval 2006, p. 220) Subsequent archaeological excavations, organized by the archaeological service of the Calvados General Council in 2007, led to the development of an overall plan for the forum. In the same year, two research phases were conducted, focusing on the houses and urban layout of the city. The first phase, carried out in June and July 2007, through sondages, helped create the forum plan and pinpoint the location of the Curia. These excavations revealed part of the central square of the forum and, with the help of two perpendicular trenches, revealed stones and blocks of Vieux marble. The second phase commenced in 2008 and extended over several years. (Note: Jardel, Lelièvre & Mazure 2014, p. 168)

== Architecture ==
=== Layout of Aregenua ===
Simplified Aregenua map.

Aregenua was constructed following the tripartite plan typical of many western cities in the Roman Empire. The administrative buildings were clustered together to create a central hub consisting of the basilica, the Curia, and other municipal structures. This hub was established in the early 2nd century and underwent further enhancements towards the end of the century. (Note: Jardel, Lelièvre & Mazure 2014, p. 174) By the 3rd century, the construction projects were largely finished, but a gradual architectural decline set in. During this period, some public buildings were replaced by a butcher's shop, which primarily catered to the trade of cattle and pigs until the 4th century. (Note: Jardel, Lelièvre & Mazure 2014, pp. 174–175 and 185)

In theory, the forum is situated at the intersection of the Cardo and Decumanus. However, in reality, only the Decumanus is visible at this site, with several cardinales also evident. The forum, positioned on a south-facing slope, combined political, religious, judicial, and commercial functions.

The building located northeast of the Champ des Crêtes baths features marble floors and an apse. (Note: Jardel, Lelièvre & Mazure 2014, p. 183) Electrical prospecting has revealed a square area measuring 85 by 50 m (279 by 164 ft), with a portico and shops on the southern side. Another structure, possibly a temple, measuring 27 by 14 m (89 by 46 ft) has been identified. As early as 2005, it was suggested that these functions, including "organs of civic and religious life," indicate the presence of a forum. (Note: Delaval 2006, pp. 217–218) Additionally, the existence of a basilica, serving as a center for commerce and justice, was also under consideration.

The location of the complex is a reflection of the city's history. The nucleus of the colony may be situated beneath this complex, as the blocks in this area are smaller, at 50 by 60 m (160 by 200 ft), than the larger peripheral blocks, which were 90 by 90 m (300 by 300 ft). The forum likely stayed in its original location, which means it is not positioned at the geometric center of the Viducasses' city. (Note: Delaval 2006, pp. 219–220)

==== Archaeological reconstruction ====
Archaeological excavations have made it possible to reconstruct a detailed picture of Aregenua, particularly because no modern settlement has been built over the Gallo-Roman remains. This type of preservation is quite exceptional for an ancient capital city, similar to the case of Jublains. The first discovery, the Thorigny Marble, dates back to 1580, and systematic excavations began at the site in 1697, 45 years before those at Pompeii.

The Vieux-la-Romaine archeological museum, opened in 2002, displays the finds, while the restored remains of the House with the Grand Peristyle are freely accessible.

Based on plans created by the Society of Antiquaries of Normandy, recent aerial and geophysical surveys have confirmed the presence of the town's forum and various public buildings, including thermal baths, a curia and likely a civil basilica, in the area known as the "Champ des Crêtes". A new excavation campaign began in 2007, intending to further explore these public buildings, which remained poorly understood in the context of the ancient city of Aregenua.

All the archaeological remains found in the Bas de Vieux area are included in the supplementary inventory of historic monuments (ISMH, June 27, 1988). The ruins of the Gallo-Roman theatre are protected under two classifications: the remains in the Jardin Poulain area are listed (CLMH, 04/21/1980), while those in the School area are only registered in the supplementary inventory (ISMH, Feb 6, 1980).

=== Notable buildings ===
==== Forum ====
The rectangular forum of Vieux measures 115 by 51.5 m (377 by 169 ft), a modest size similar to that of an insula. Two decumani provide access to it from the longer sides. It is situated at the edge of a plateau overlooking the La Guigne valley, surrounded by various streets, two decumani (G and H), and a cardo (C). (Note: Jardel, Lelièvre & Mazure 2014, p. 171)

The central square measures 68 by 21 m (223 by 69 ft) and appears to be divided into two distinct zones: a sacred area, with a temple, to the west and a public area to the east. Surrounding the square are shops of standard dimensions, ranging from 5.9 to 6.2 m (19 to 20 ft). Porticos separate the square from the shops.

North of the central square, archaeology reveals the presence of shops and portico galleries that underwent modifications over the centuries. The shops to the south of the square remained relatively unchanged. The therma discovered in the 19th century was further to the north. (Note: Jardel, Lelièvre & Mazure 2014, p. 170) Traces to the west of the square suggest potential developments, but their exact nature remains undetermined.

The porticos and shops are situated on the longest sides. In the western part of the north-south axis, two shops measuring 8 m^{2} (86 square feet) each were uncovered during the archaeological excavations of 1982. These shops were separated by a wattle wall and a wooden partition. One of the shops is believed to have belonged to a grain and pottery seller, while the other was a pottery shop, equipped with clay and a potter's kiln. In front of the two shops, a gutter and a sidewalk were also discovered. Unfortunately, these two shops were destroyed at the end of the 3rd century.

==== Temple and sacred area ====
In antiquity, religious and civic life were closely intertwined. (Note: Jardel, Lelièvre & Mazure 2014, p. 173) Archaeological evidence shows that no roads passed through the sacred area, indicating the likely presence of a porticus triplex. The temple, believed to have been constructed in the latter half of the 2nd century, appears to be 12.5 by 11 m (41 by 36 ft), with a wall thickness of 1.25 m (4.1 ft); the east wall was made of Vieux marble.

Archaeologists suggest that this temple could have been dedicated to deities such as Mercury, Sucellus, and Vulcan, or an imperial cult, all of which were revered in the city. A fragment of an altar referencing the cult of Vulcan and the imperial cult was uncovered during the excavations. Vulcan, a deity highly esteemed in the Viducasses territory due to its abundant iron deposits, may have been particularly significant. Additionally, two molds from the 3rd century, which were used by coroplasts for creating images of Mercury and Sucellus, were found in a marble workshop.

==== Curia ====
===== Construction and evolution =====
General layout of the forum in the late 2nd century.

Development of the eastern section of the forum from its inception to the close of the 2nd century.

The local curia was constructed in two phases. The initial phase involved building a significant room, measuring 12.4 by 9.1 m (41 by 30 ft), which was later expanded and enhanced at the end of the 2nd century. (Note: Boislève & Jardel 2010, pp. 631–632) This phase continued until the second half of the 3rd century, (Note: Boislève & Jardel 2010, p. 632) with the room growing to 12.15 by 14.6 m (39.9 by 47.9 ft). During this period, the painting and marble work were redone. Subsequently, the eastern facade was shifted by 1.5 m (4.9 ft), resulting in a curia measuring 14.8 by 14.6 m (49 by 48 ft). The old eastern wall was repurposed to create a podium, which was covered with limestone slabs joined by ceramic shards, and featured three rows of steps arranged in a semi-circle.

The building is surrounded by an imposing wall, reinforced by buttresses in the eastern part. In the second half of the 2nd century, the eastern wall was lowered, and a new wall was built further away. These adjustments allowed for an extension of the aula (courtyard) and an enlargement of the building by about 3 m (9.8 ft). The old eastern wall was repurposed as a platform, and niches were created to accommodate statues of various deities.

The western facade features a stylobate made of Caen stone.

===== Decoration =====
Origins of the different decorative stones used in the forum.

In the backfills from 19th-century excavations conducted by the Society of Antiquaries of Normandy, plaster fragments have been discovered. These fragments have allowed for the recreation of marbled decor, although many are too small for a detailed study. The various fragments suggest the presence of a multi-colored opus sectile dating to the 2nd century: one on a red background resembling red porphyry, another with various shades of yellow in imitation of Chemtou marble, a third on a pink background, and a fourth on a green background which imitates antique green marble. (Note: Boislève & Jardel 2010, pp. 632–633) Among the depicted elements are the shadow of a candelabra base, an unknown figure's garment, and a panther's skin. (Note: Boislève & Jardel 2010, p. 633) However, most of the decorations have been lost due to the 19th-century excavations and subsequent site abandonment. Archaeological findings have uncovered 36,280 fragments dating from the second half of the 2nd century, primarily attributed to the Curia.

The materials used for decoration are diverse and sourced from various regions of the Roman Empire. These include marble from the Greek island of Skyros, Allier in Gaul, Chemtou in the Roman province of Africa (currently Tunisia), and Phrygia. Additionally, oil shale from the Autun region and limestone from the Pyrenees were also utilized.

==== "Salle IV" ====
North of the Curia, "Salle IV" also features a stylobate made of Caen stone. A 12-metre (39-foot)-long and 0.66-metre (2.2-foot)-high mural painting adorned the top of the facade, serving as a decorative element for the room's gallery. Unfortunately, only the lower part of the painting survives, as the upper part was destroyed in a fire during the mid-3rd century. This incident led to the reorganization of the gallery to the west of the Curia.

The quality of the plaster conservation varies greatly: some areas are nearly undetectable, especially in the upper part. The lower section is better preserved, showing a beige and khaki baseboard topped with a white strip, measuring between 25 and 27 cm (9.8 and 10.6 in) in height. Above the base, there are imitations of rocks in diamond- and disc-shaped compartments. (Note: Boislève & Jardel 2010, p. 634) These rocks are made of yellow marble from Chemtou, red porphyry, and green marble. The shapes are not perfectly geometric: the diamonds are irregular, and the discs are not always centered.

==== Vestibule ====
The vestibule is situated to the west of the forum and south of the Curia. (Note: Jardel, Lelièvre & Mazure 2014, p. 175) It serves as a connection between these two public spaces, measuring 9 by 5.9 m (30 by 19 ft). The room appears to have experienced significant ground subsidence, leading to severe deterioration of the floor. Extensive renovations, including the installation of a new floor, appear to have been carried out in the latter part of the 2nd century.

In the late 2nd or early 3rd century, the vestibulum was enhanced with a grand entrance made of local marble, measuring 4.1 m (13 ft). (Note: Jardel, Lelièvre & Mazure 2014, p. 177) This entrance leads to the Curia, which is in the shape of a hemicycle and features three rows of steps and a podium. The floor of the Curia is constructed of concrete made from gravel mortar. The southern and western walls were originally intended to have frescoes, but their interpretation remains unclear.

==== Archive room ====
To the south, a passage measuring 9 by 4 m (30 by 13 ft), with a floor made of pink mortar, connects the Curia to another room (Note: Jardel, Lelièvre & Mazure 2014, p. 176) This room, with its sole access from the Curia, is believed by archaeologists to have served as a tabularium, a space used for storing public records.

==== Statue ====
Archaeologists believe that a statue of Titus Sennius Solemnis, a prominent political figure of the city, likely adorned the forum in the 3rd century, due to the discovery of the Thorigny Marble.

== See also ==
- U-shaped courtyard house in Vieux-la-Romaine
- House with the Grand Peristyle in Vieux-la-Romaine

== Annexes ==
=== Bibliography ===
==== General books and articles on the city ====
- Bertin, Dominique (1977). "La topographie de Vieux - Araegenuae (Calvados), capitale de la cité des Viducasses, d'après les fouilles anciennes et les sondages récents". Annales de Normandie (in French). 27 (27/2): 131–150. doi:10.3406/annor.1977.5222.
- Bouet, Pierre; Neveux, François (2006). "Un exemple d'échec urbain en Gaule Lyonnaise: Aregenua, chef-lieu des Viducasses (Vieux, Calvados)". Les Villes Normandes Au Moyen Ge (in French): 29–44. ISBN 978-2-84133-810-8.
- Delaval, Éric (2004). "Vieux/Aregenua (Calvados)". Supplément à la Revue archéologique du centre de la France (in French) (25): 497–500. ISBN 2-913272-10-X. ISSN 1159-7151.
- Delaval, Éric (2006). "Vieux, antique Aregenua: actualité de la recherche". Revue archéologique (in French) (1): 215–220. JSTOR 41933768.
- Deniaux, Élisabeth (2002). "La conquête et l'intégration à l'Empire romain". La Normandie Avant les Normands (in French). Rennes: Ouest-France. ISBN 2737311179.
- Fichet de Clairefontaine, François; Delaval, Eric; Hincker, Vincent; le Maho, Jacques (2004). "Capitales déchues de la Normandie antique. État de la question". Capitales éphémères (in French) (25). Supplément à la Revue archéologique du centre de la France: 141–155.
- Groud-Coudray, Claude (2007). La Normandie gallo-romaine (in French). Cully: OREP éditions. ISBN 978-2-915762-18-1.
- Pilet, Christian (1984). "Vieux antique (Araegenuae, Viducasses)". Revue archéologique de l'ouest (in French). 1 (1): 63–84. doi:10.3406/rao.1984.861.
- Service départemental d'archéologie (September 2015). "Vieux-la-Romaine, nouvelles découvertes et reconstitutions". Archéologia (in French) (535): 62–67. ISSN 0570-6270.
- Vipard, Pascal (1998). La maison du "Bas de Vieux" une riche habitation romaine du quartier des thermes d'Aregenua (Vieux, Calvados) (in French). Caen: Service départemental d'archéologie du Calvados. ISBN 2-9506496-1-0.
- Vipard, Pascal (2004). La cité d'Aregenua (Vieux, Calvados); chef-lieu des Viducasses. état des connaissances (in French). Château-Gonthier: Errance. ISBN 978-2-913993-05-1.

==== Books on the forum ====
- Boislève, Julien; Jardel, Karine (2010). "Imitations de marbres du forum de Vieux (Calvados, France), quelques particularités de la seconde moitié du IIe s. ap. J.-C". Antike Malerei Zwischen Lokalstil und Zeitstil, Akten des XI. Internationalen Kolloquiums der AIPMA (in French): 631–637.
- Jardel, Karine; Lelièvre, Jean-Yves; Schütz, Grégory (2007). "Vieux – Le Champ des Crêtes". ADLFI. Archéologie de la France - Informations (in French). doi:10.4000/adlfi.7329.
- Jardel, Karine; Boislève, Julien; Tendron, Graziella (2012). "Aménagement et décor de la curie du forum d'Aregenua (Vieux, Calvados)". Décor des édifices publics, civils et religieux en Gaule durant l'Antiquité (in French). Association des Publications Chauvinoises: 91–110.
- Jardel, Karine; Lelièvre, Jean-Yves; Mazure, Pierre (2014). "Le forum et la curie d'Aregenua (Vieux, Calvados): Bilan sur les découvertes anciennes et les recherches récentes" [The forum and curia of Aregenua (Vieux, Calvados): a review of ancient discoveries and recent research]. Gallia - Archéologie de la France antique (in French). 71 (2): 163–188. doi:10.4000/11q1b.
- Jardel, Karine; Lelièvre, Jean-Yves; Mazure, Pierre (2016). "Vieux – Le forum". ADLFI. Archéologie de la France - Informations (in French). doi:10.4000/adlfi.17069.
- Jardel, Karine; Tendron, Graziella; Lelièvre, Jean-Yves (2017). "Les décors d'applique de la curie du forum d'Aregenua (Vieux, Calvados)". Décor et architecture en Gaule entre l'Antiquité et le haut Moyen ge (in French): 451–461.
- Lacroix, Aurore (2013). "La vaisselle en verre du forum de Vieux (Calvados)". Bulletin de l'Association Française pour l'Archéologie du Verre (in French): 48–52.
- Tendron, Graziella; Germain-Vallée, Cécile; Jardel, Karine (2012). "Un atelier de marbrier dans la curie du forum d'Aregenua (Vieux, Calvados)". Décor des édifices publics civils et religieux en Gaule durant l'Antiquité, Ier - IVe siècle: Peinture, mosaïque, stuc et décor architectonique (in French): 111–134.
