= Vieux-la-Romaine Archaeological Museum =

Archaeological museum in Vieux, France

Archaeological Museum of Vieux-la-Romaine
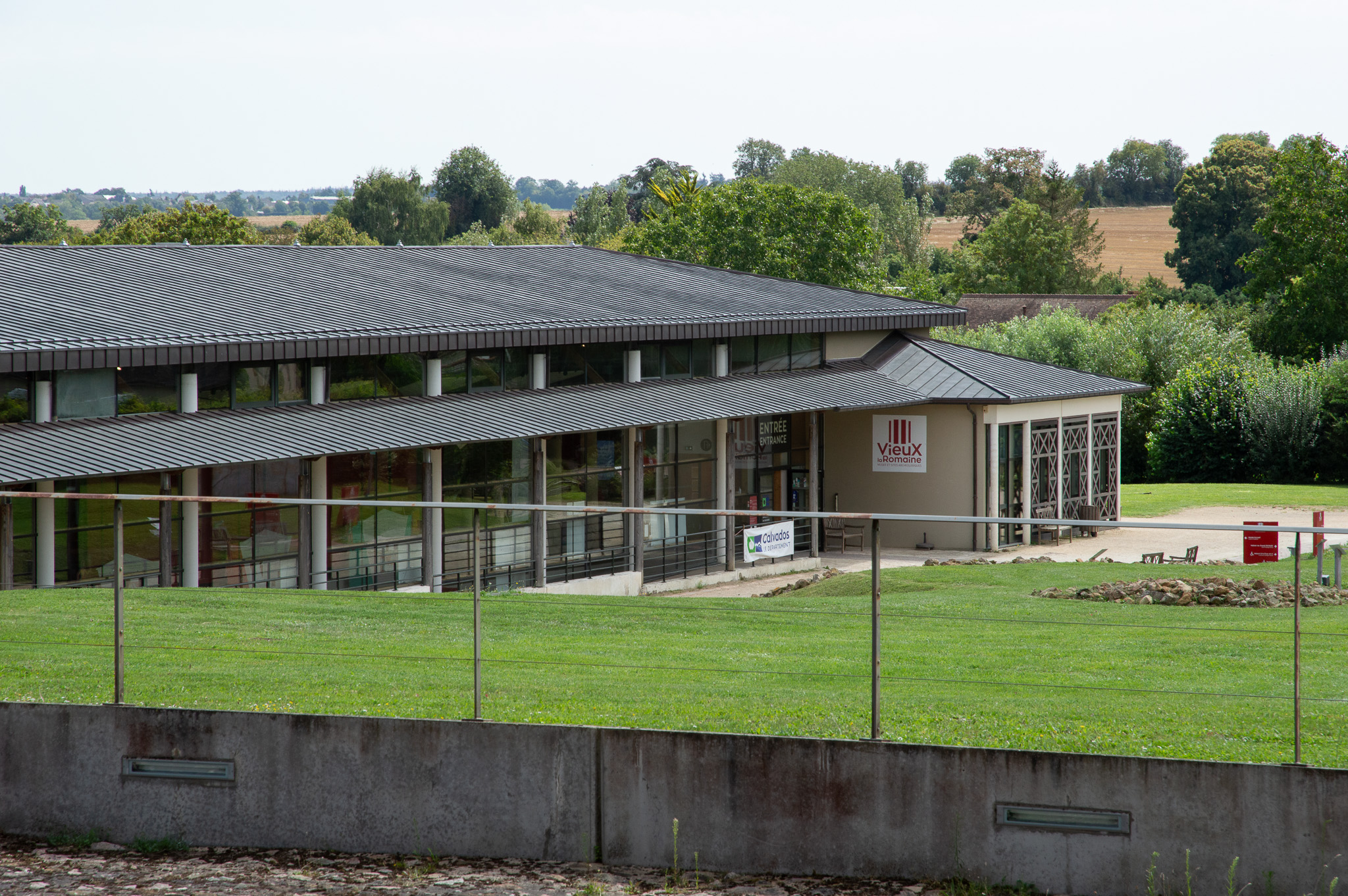
- Main entrance in 2023
- Established: 2002
- Location: 13, chemin Haussé; 14930 Vieux, Calvados; France
- Coordinates: 49°06′22″N 0°25′47″W
- Type: Archaeology museum
- Collections: Roman archaeological collections
- Collection size: 4,000
- Visitors: 21,433 (2019)
- Executive director: Xavier Savary

The Vieux-la-Romaine Archaeological Museum is an archaeological museum located in the municipality of Vieux. It was inaugurated on 21 February 2002.

The museum is situated near the remains of the Roman city of Aregenua, the capital of the civitas of the Viducasses. The archaeological site includes a Gallo-Roman theater of Vieux, a forum, a house with a U-shaped courtyard, and a house with the large peristyle.

== History ==
=== Foundation and peak during Antiquity ===
The museum is located on the site of the Roman city of Aregenua, which was founded in the 1st century, likely during the reign of Emperor Augustus. The city developed under his successors, Tiberius and Claudius, and reached its peak in the 2nd and 3rd centuries, with an estimated population of around 5,000 over 30–37 hectares. The first Roman-style buildings appeared around 120–140, and the house with the large peristyle dates from the Severan period. In the 3rd century, the city became known as Civitas Viducassium (Note: Jardel, Lelièvre & Mazure 2014, p. 163) and joined the Gallic Empire under Postumus during the Crisis of the Third Century. Decline began in the mid-3rd century, with the abandonment of several districts. Around 400, Aregenua lost its status as a civitas capital to Augustodurum and experienced a significant population decrease.

Aregenua was the capital of the Viducasses, whose territory covered approximately 2,300 km². The city was granted Latin rights, and its inhabitants were exempt from the tributum soli, the land tax owed to Rome. The administrative complex included buildings such as the basilica and the curia.

=== Christianization and ruralization in the Middle Ages ===
Christianity became established in the settlement between the 5th and 7th centuries, during a period of increasing ruralization. In the Merovingian period, the site experienced renewed development before the population gradually relocated to a more northerly area.

=== Rediscovery in the modern and contemporary periods ===
Excavations at the site of Aregenua began in the 17th century in the southern part of the village and continued in 1703 under the supervision of Nicolas-Joseph Foucault, intendant of the Généralité of Caen. Excavations gained particular significance in the 19th century under the direction of the Society of Antiquaries of Normandy.

After the Allied bombings of Normandy during the Second World War, the village of Vieux was rebuilt without prior archaeological investigations. Archaeological programs in the Vieux-la-Romaine area were initiated in the 1980s by the Calvados Department Archaeological Service, established in 1982. Permanent excavations began in 1988, with the long-term goal of creating an archaeological center featuring site restoration and public access. A museum project was planned contingent on the discovery of significant and well-preserved artifacts.

=== Musealization in the 21st century ===
The discovery of the house with the large peristyle between 1988 and 1991, notable for its rich decoration, prompted the Departmental Council of Calvados to develop the site as a center of cultural tourism. The gardens of the house were opened to the public in 1993. The decision to construct a museum was made in 1998, and the foundation stone was laid in 2000.

Excavations conducted during the construction of the museum revealed a complex comprising several small temples. The creation of the parking area in 2001 led to the rediscovery of an entertainment building previously identified between 1952 and 1954. The museum was inaugurated on 21 February 2002 by Anne d'Ornano. In 2005, the General Council of Calvados acquired the plot known as the "Champ des Crêtes" to establish an archaeological reserve and prevent residential development.

== Museum complex ==
=== Forum ===
The forum was constructed at the beginning of the 2nd century and underwent two modifications: at the end of the 2nd century and during the first third of the 3rd century. Excavations at the forum site began in 1703 under the supervision of Nicolas-Joseph Foucault. Between 1839 and 1861, Arcisse de Caumont and Antoine Charma continued the work. On 19 March 1840, de Caumont cleared the walls and part of the seating of the Curia. (Note: Jardel, Lelièvre & Mazure 2014, p. 164) In 1859, Charma and the Société des Antiquaires de Normandie produced plans of the building and documented recently revealed marble decorations. (Note: Jardel, Lelièvre & Mazure 2014, p. 165) The Society of Antiquaries of Normandy continued excavations through the second half of the 19th century. (Note: Jardel, Lelièvre & Mazure 2014, p. 166) A new archaeological campaign began in 1972, uncovering remains from the reigns of Tiberius and Nero through the 4th century. Electrical surveys were conducted in 2005, (Note: Jardel, Lelièvre & Mazure 2014, pp. 167, 169) followed by additional excavations in 2007 and 2008. (Note: Jardel, Lelièvre & Mazure 2014, pp. 167–168)

The forum is rectangular, measuring 115 m by 51.5 m, and is situated off-center on a plateau overlooking the La Guigne valley. (Note: Jardel, Lelièvre & Mazure 2014, p. 171) It is accessed via two decumani and one cardo, and is surrounded by shops. In the western part of the site, a temple and a sacred area have been identified, although the deity of the temple remains unspecified. (Note: Jardel, Lelièvre & Mazure 2014, p. 174) Archaeologists have recovered 36,280 fragments, which have helped reconstruct part of the building's decoration.

Forum of Vieux-la-Romaine

General plan of the forum at the end of the 2nd century.

Origin of the various decorative stones used in the forum.

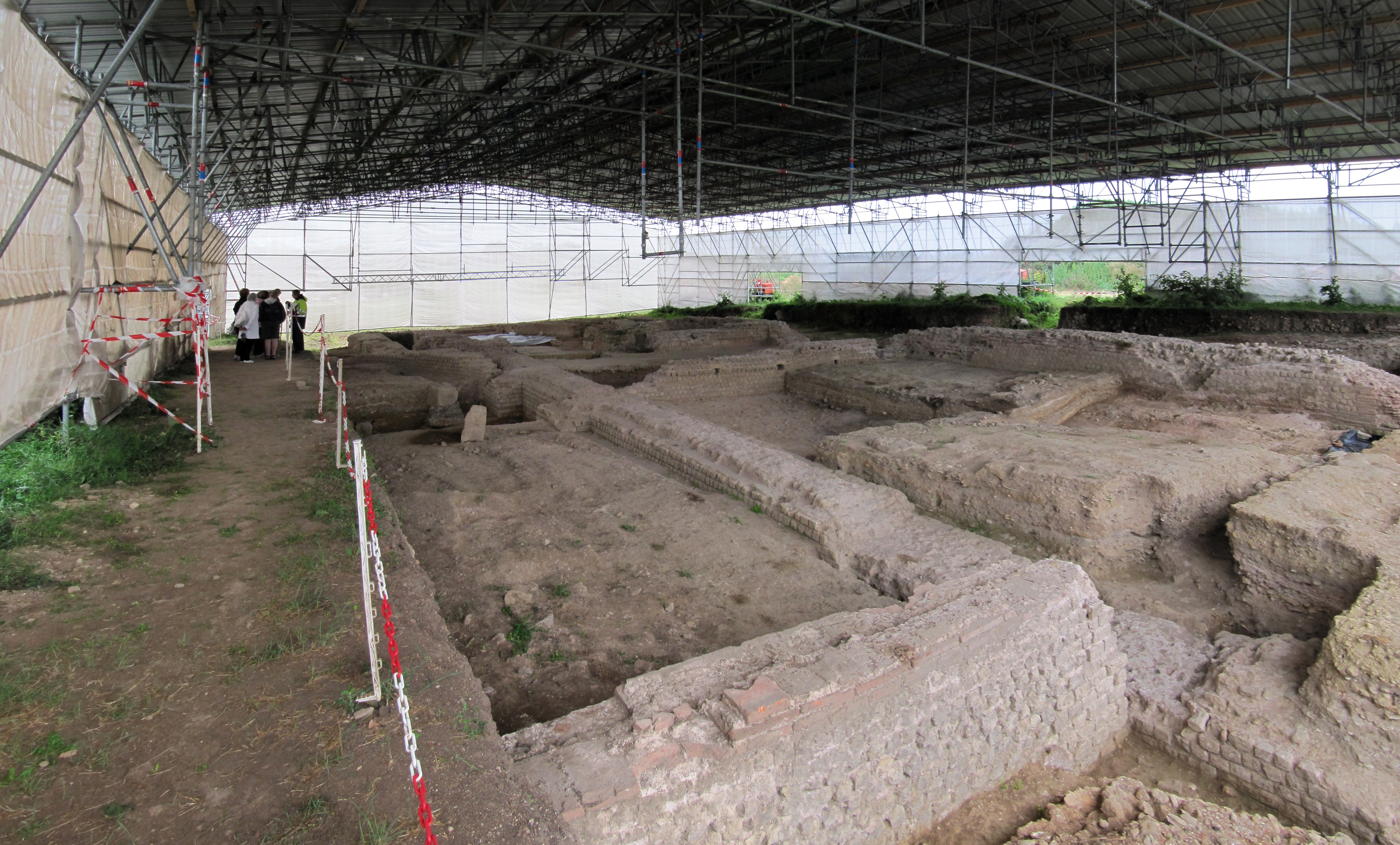
Overview of the excavations.

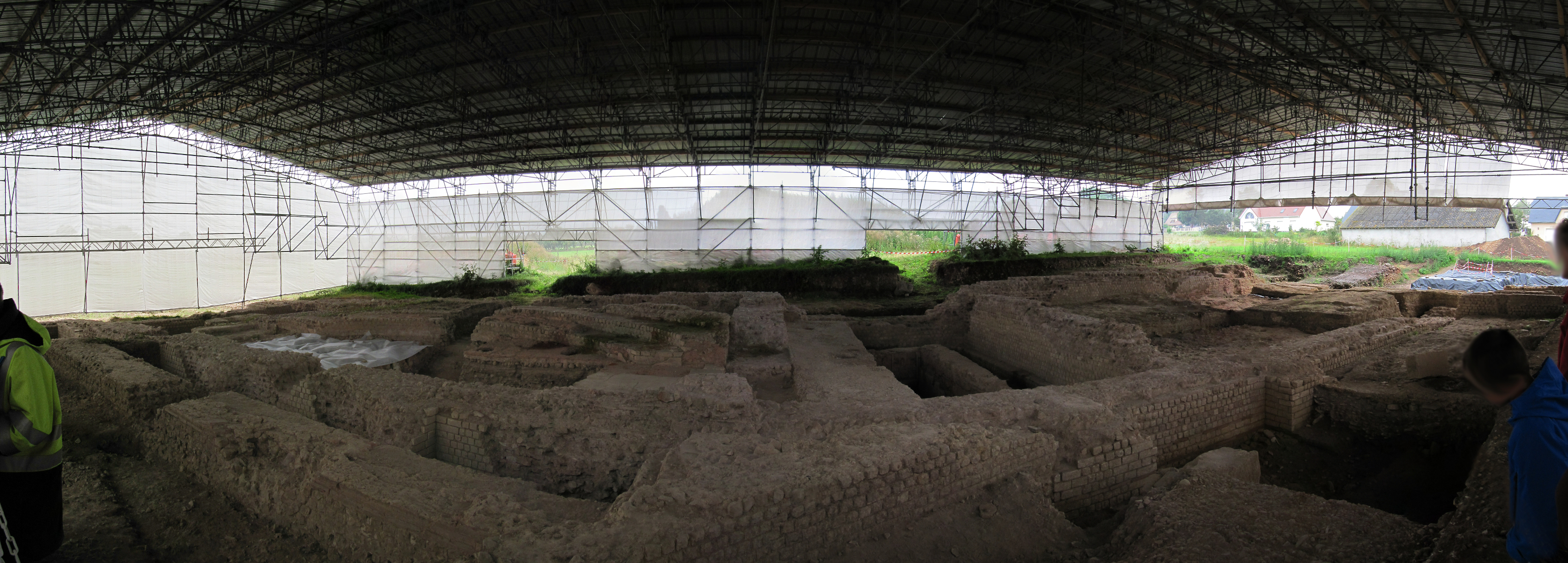
Panoramic view of the excavations.

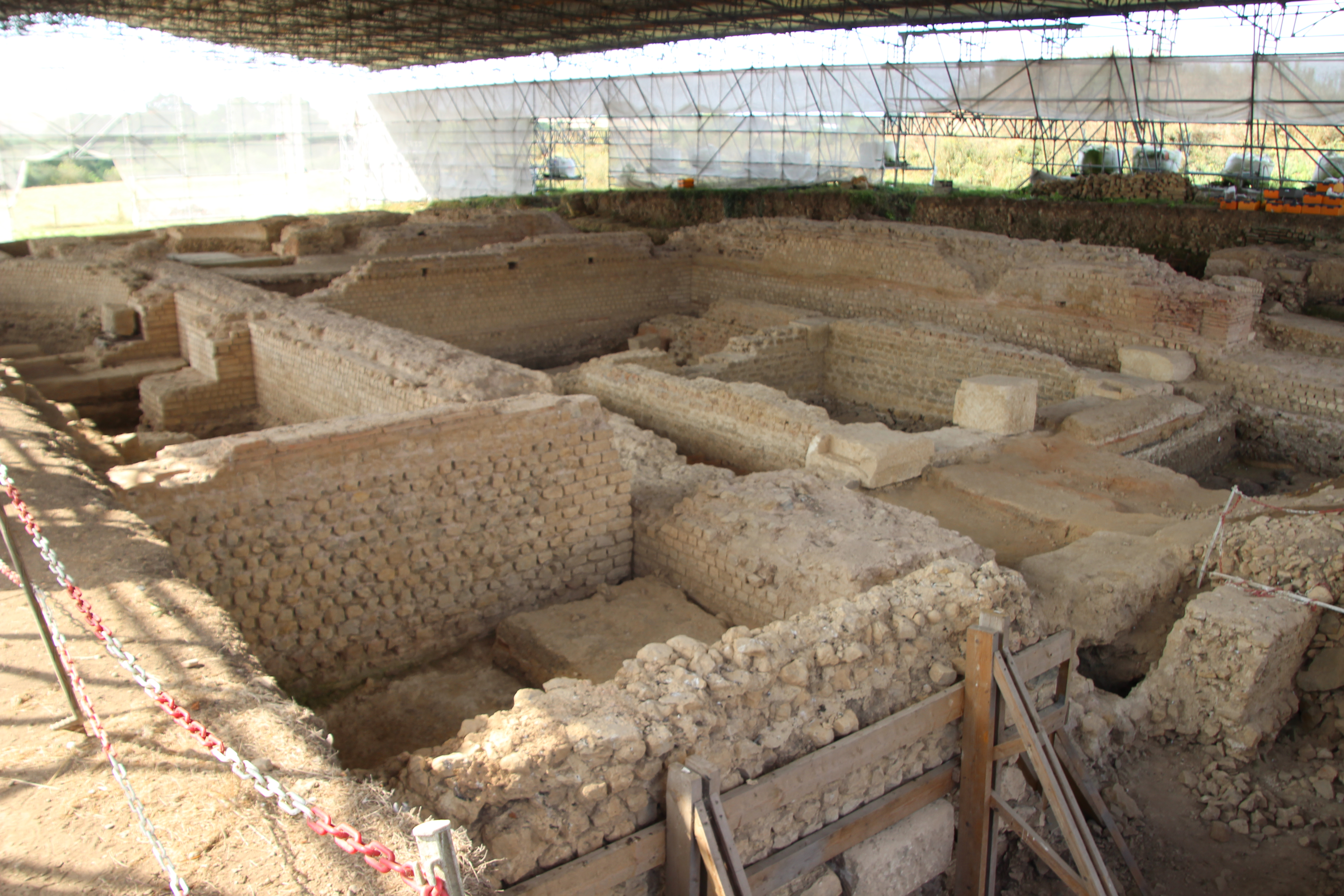
Foundations of part of the forum.

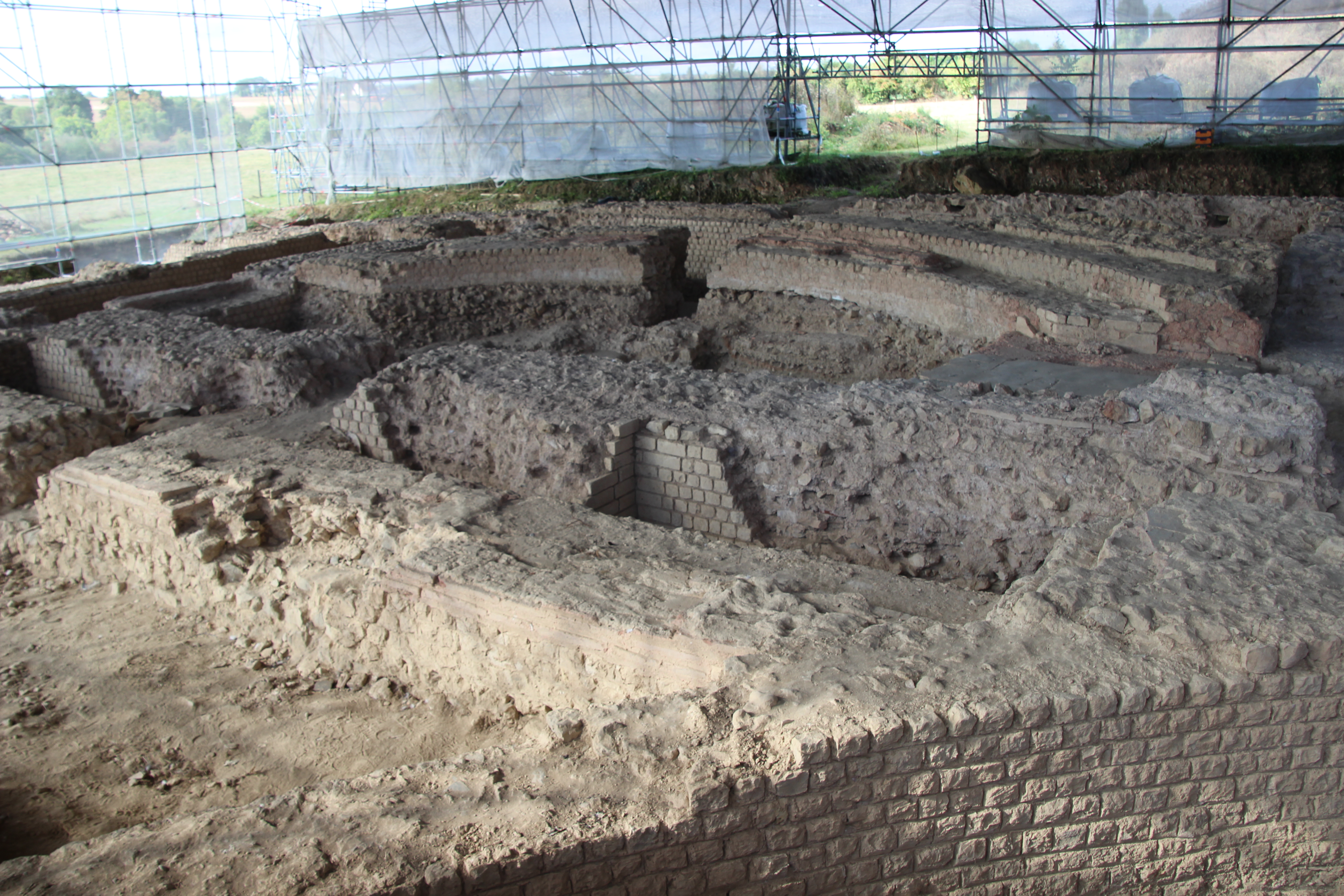
Remains of the Curia.

=== House with the U-shaped courtyard ===
The construction of the house is generally dated to the late 1st century or early 2nd century, although some evidence suggests it may date to the second half of the 2nd century or early 3rd century. Toward the end of the Roman period, the house likely housed an artisan working with bone. The original cellar was filled in during this time. The house was abandoned from the second half of the 3rd century onward, and the Roman remains suffered degradation during the medieval period due to exposure to the elements.

Excavations at the house began in the 1990s, and a shelter was constructed in 2008 as part of site enhancements. Archaeological investigations revealed part of a Tuscan-order column, as well as human and animal remains, including a child aged eight to ten and a horse.The house is located approximately 100 meters from the museum and has a total area of 197 m², including an 85 m² courtyard. The floor is constructed of tuileau concrete. The residential section contains five rooms, and the 13.5 m² cellar likely functioned as a storage area. The house was connected to the period's sewer network. Its inhabitants were probably of a lower social status than those of the house with the large peristyle.

U-shaped courtyard house

Plan of the house.

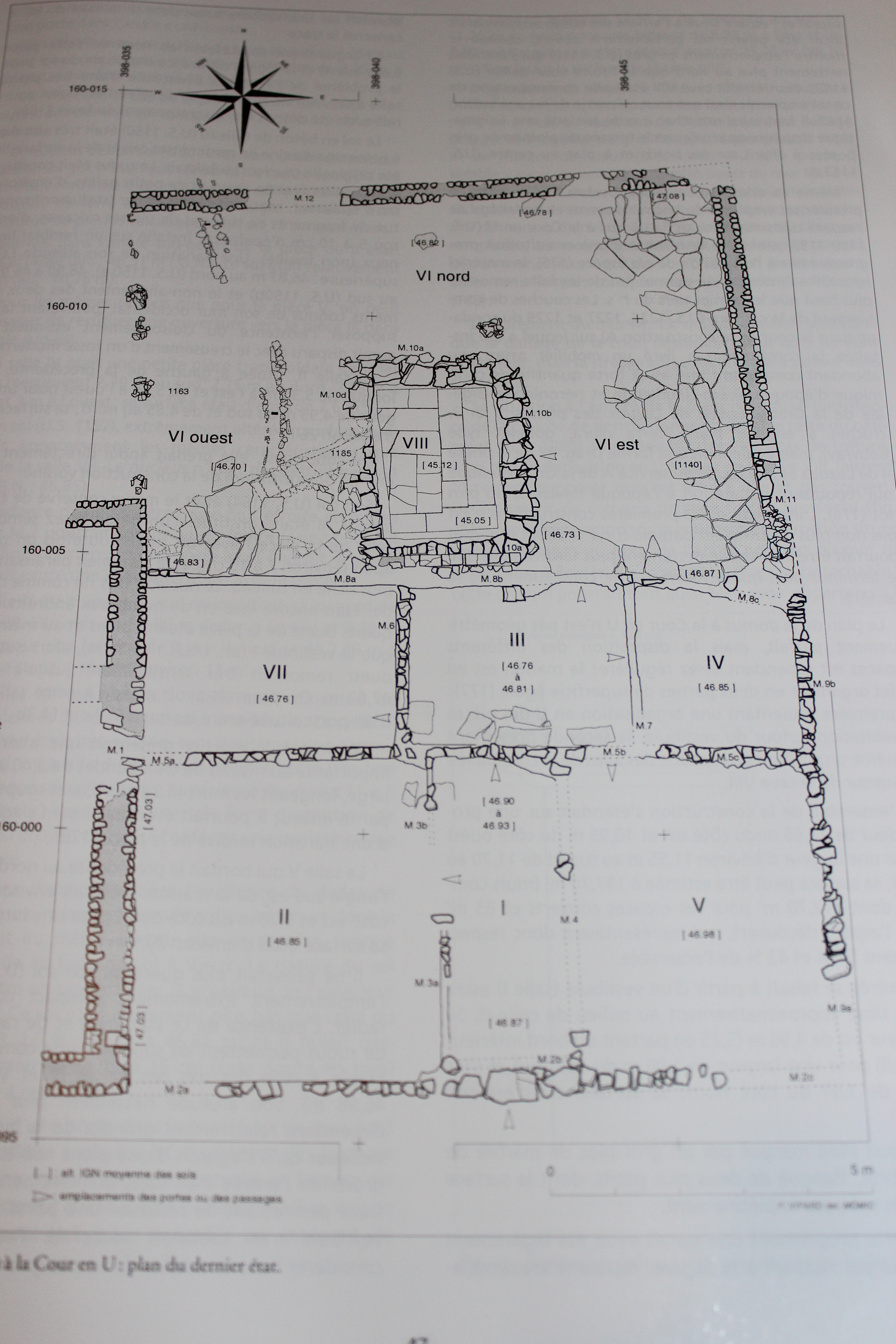
Plan based on an excavation report.

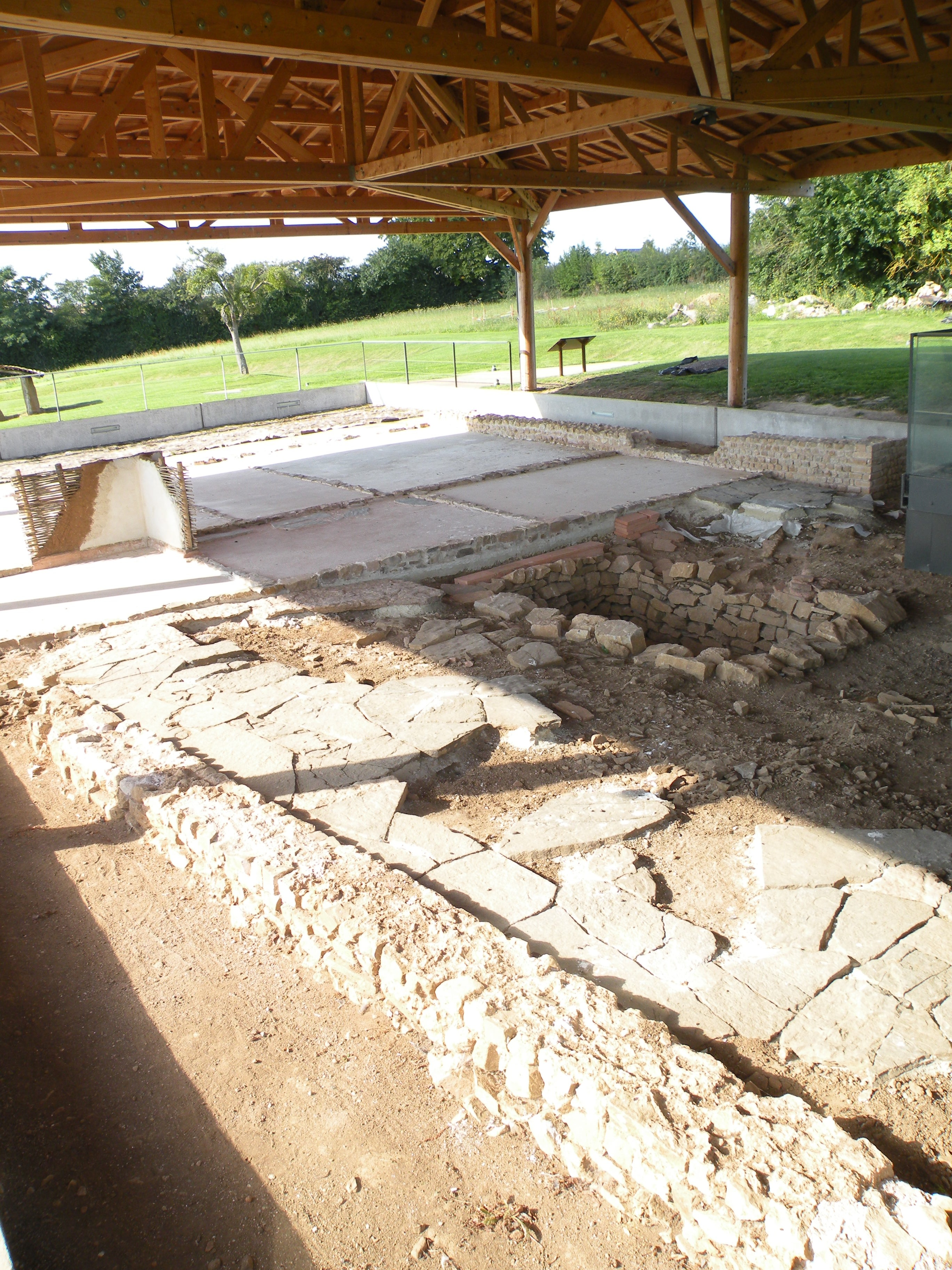
Courtyard protecting the remains of the house.

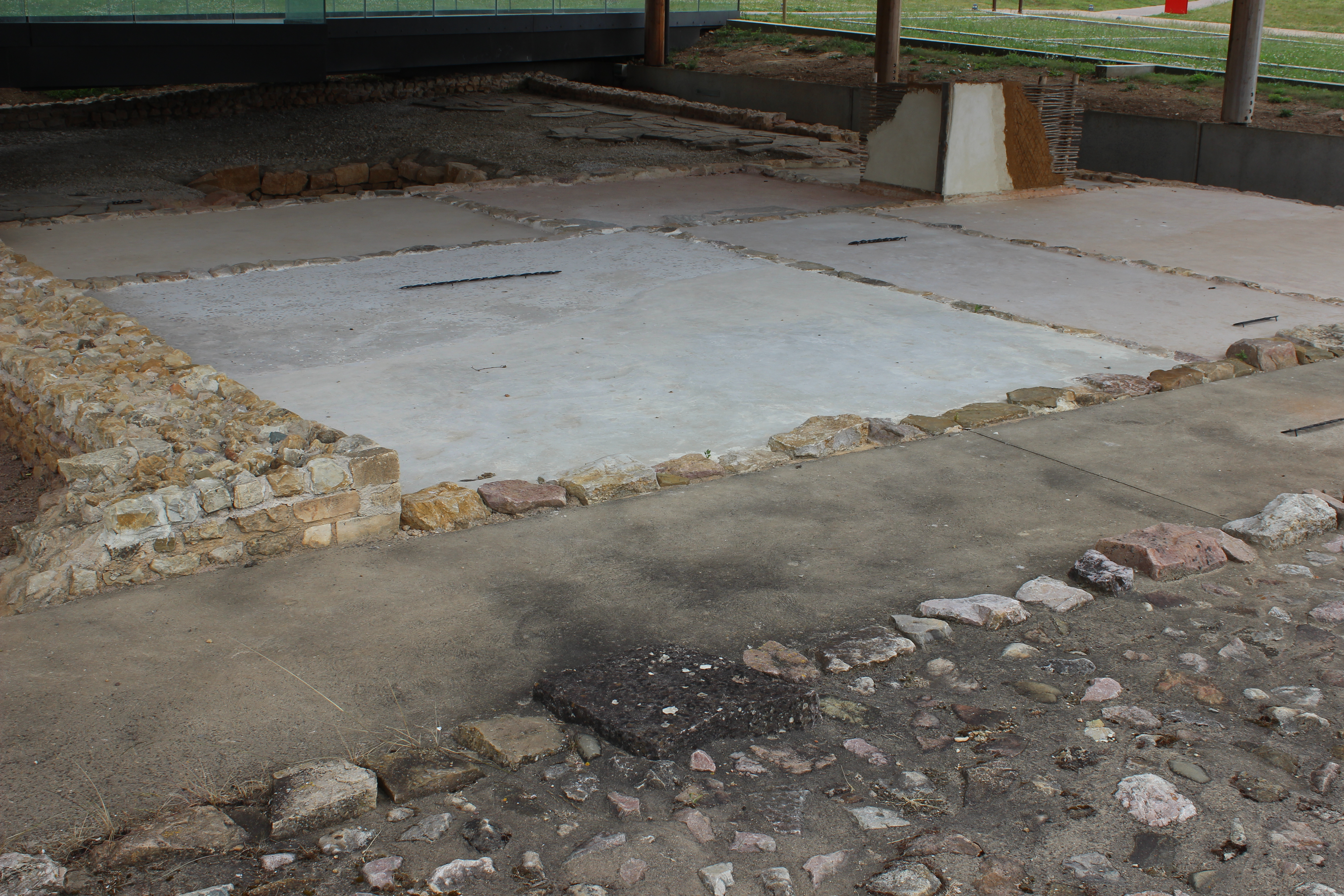
General view of the layout of the rooms of the house from the street.

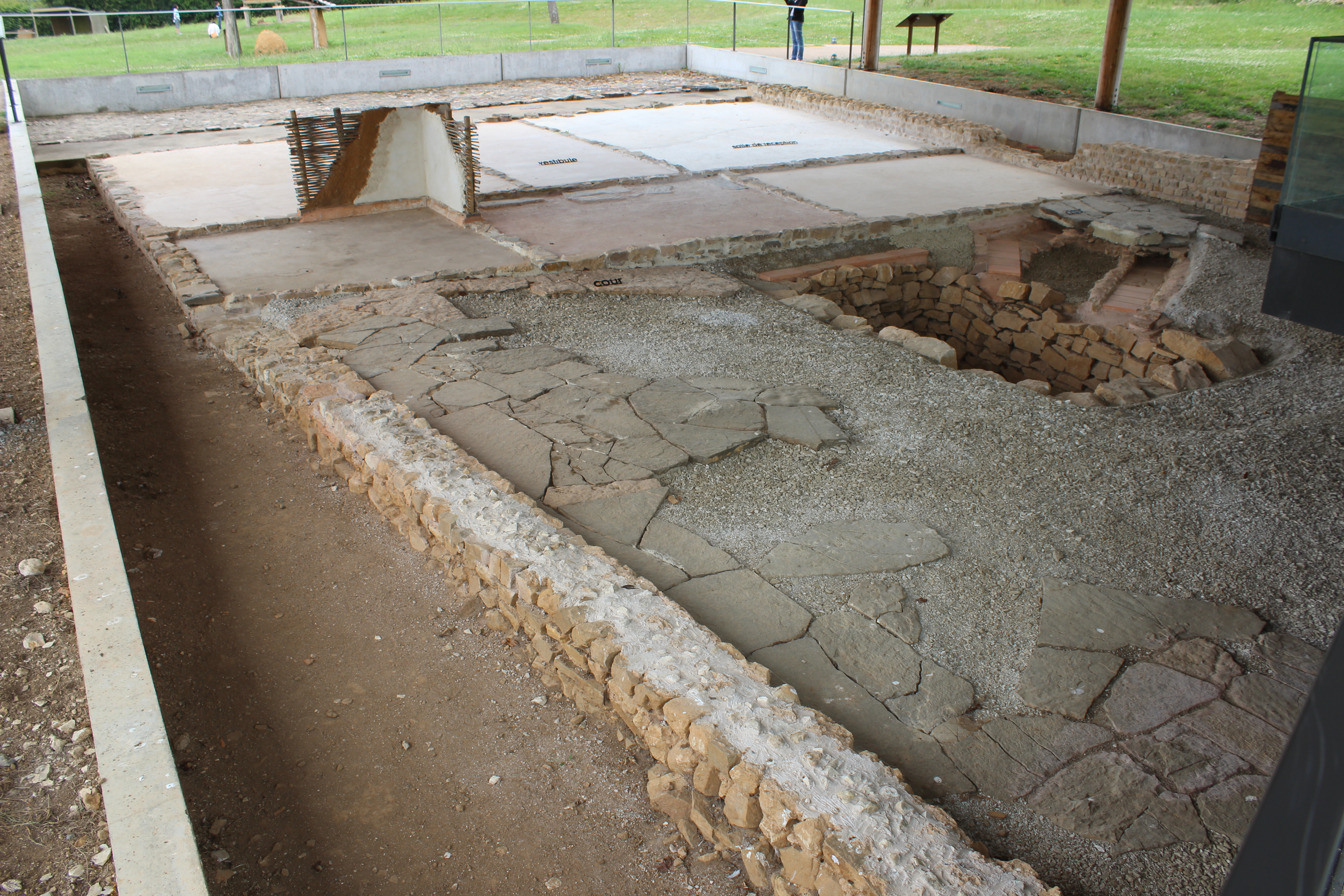
General view of the house from the courtyard.

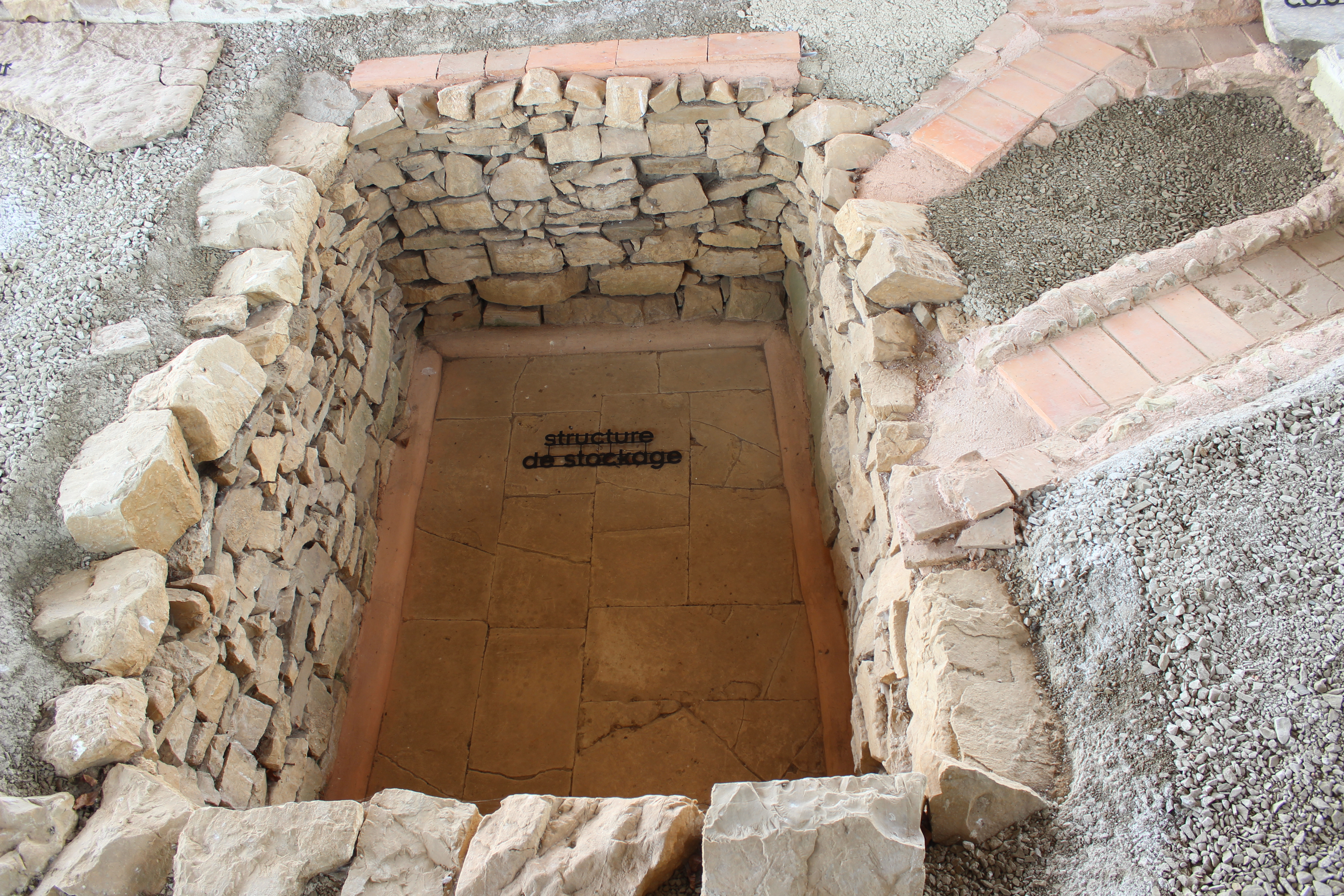
Storage space.

=== House with the large peristyle ===
Before the construction of the house, the site contained light wooden structures during the 1st and 2nd centuries. In the mid-2nd century, a stone insula was built, which was later replaced by two houses, one of which in the western part was quickly demolished. Around 170–180, a house with a small peristyle was constructed. At the end of the 2nd century or the beginning of the 3rd century, the house was expanded into the house with the large peristyle. Following a fire, it was abandoned at the end of the 3rd century. (Note: Vipard 1998, p. 100) After another fire in the early 4th century, the building was used for material recovery and reuse. (Note: Vipard 1998, p. 102) By the 18th century, the site was completely covered with soil and converted into cultivated land. (Note: Vipard 1998, p. 104)

The first discovery at the site, a mosaic, was made in 1812. In 1826, the Society of Antiquaries of Normandy initiated excavations. Systematic archaeological work on the house took place from 1988 to 1991 under the direction of Pascal Vipard. (Note: Vipard 1998, p. 113) The tutela of Vieux-la-Romaine was discovered in August 1988. The house was prepared for public access starting in September 1992 and opened in July 1993, with its gardens also opening that year. It is the only Roman-period building open to visitors in Lower Normandy and the only peristyle house accessible in northern France.

House with large peristyle in Vieux-la-Romaine

Plan at the height of the house.

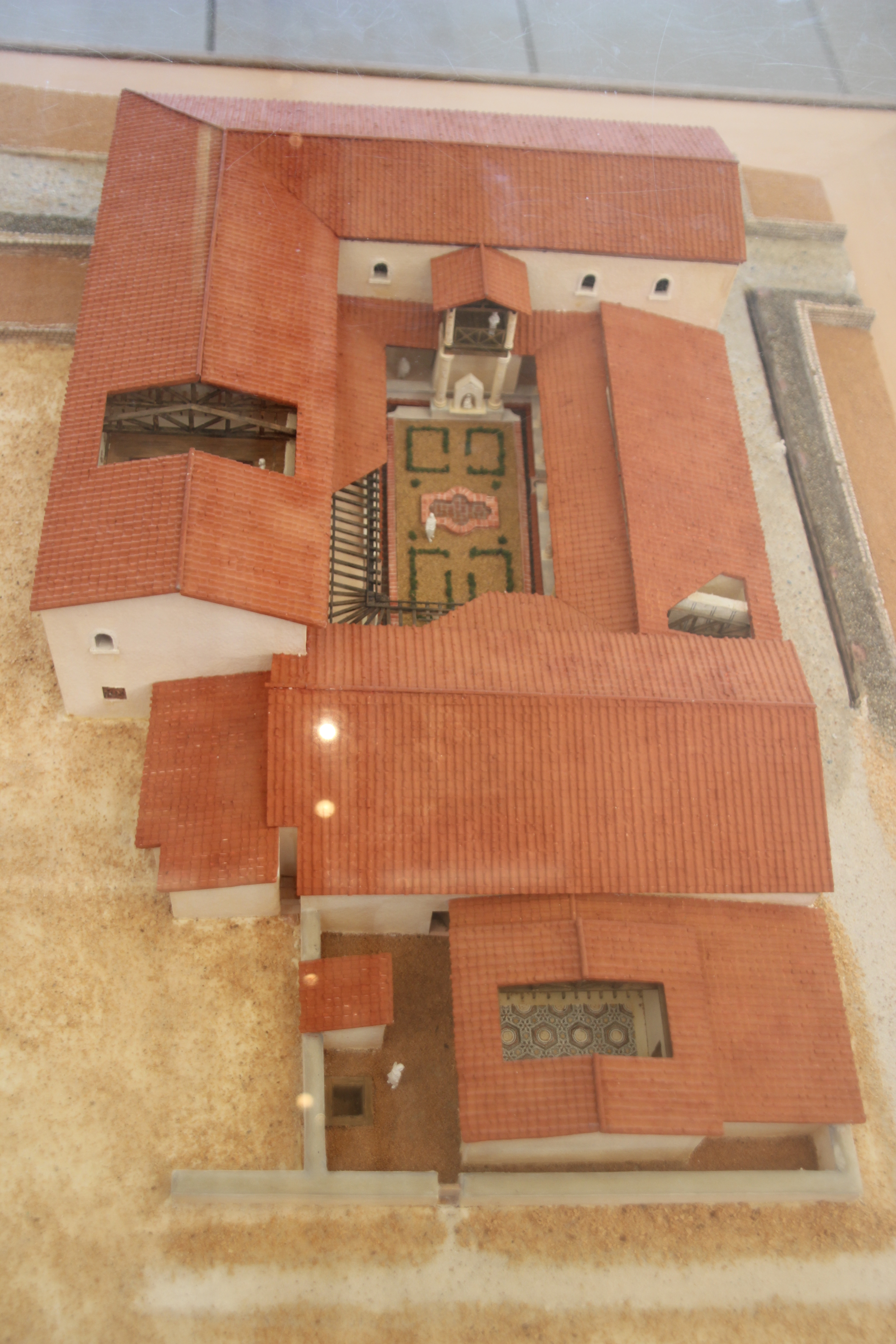
Model reconstruction of the house in the 3rd century.

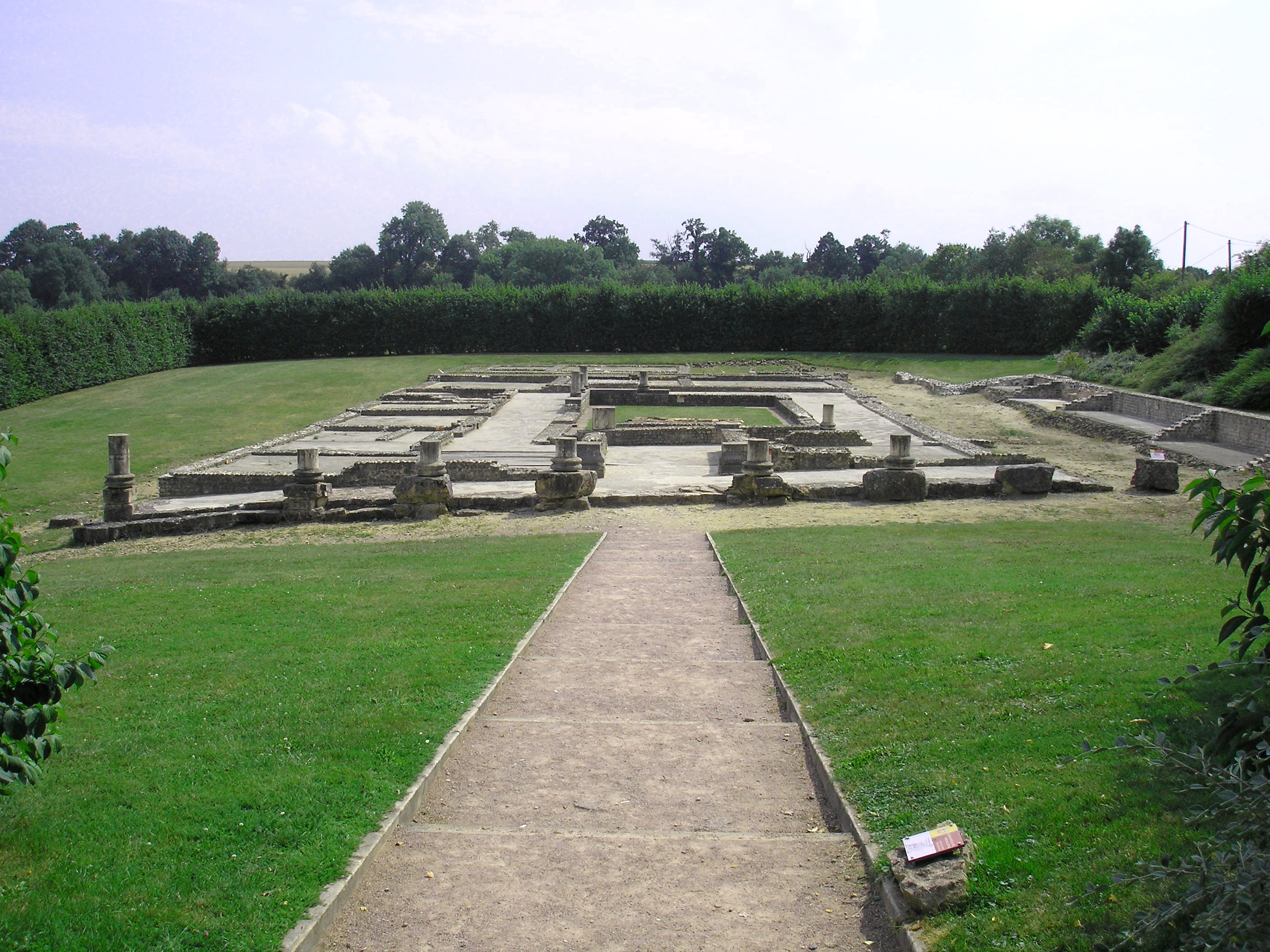
General view of the main facade.

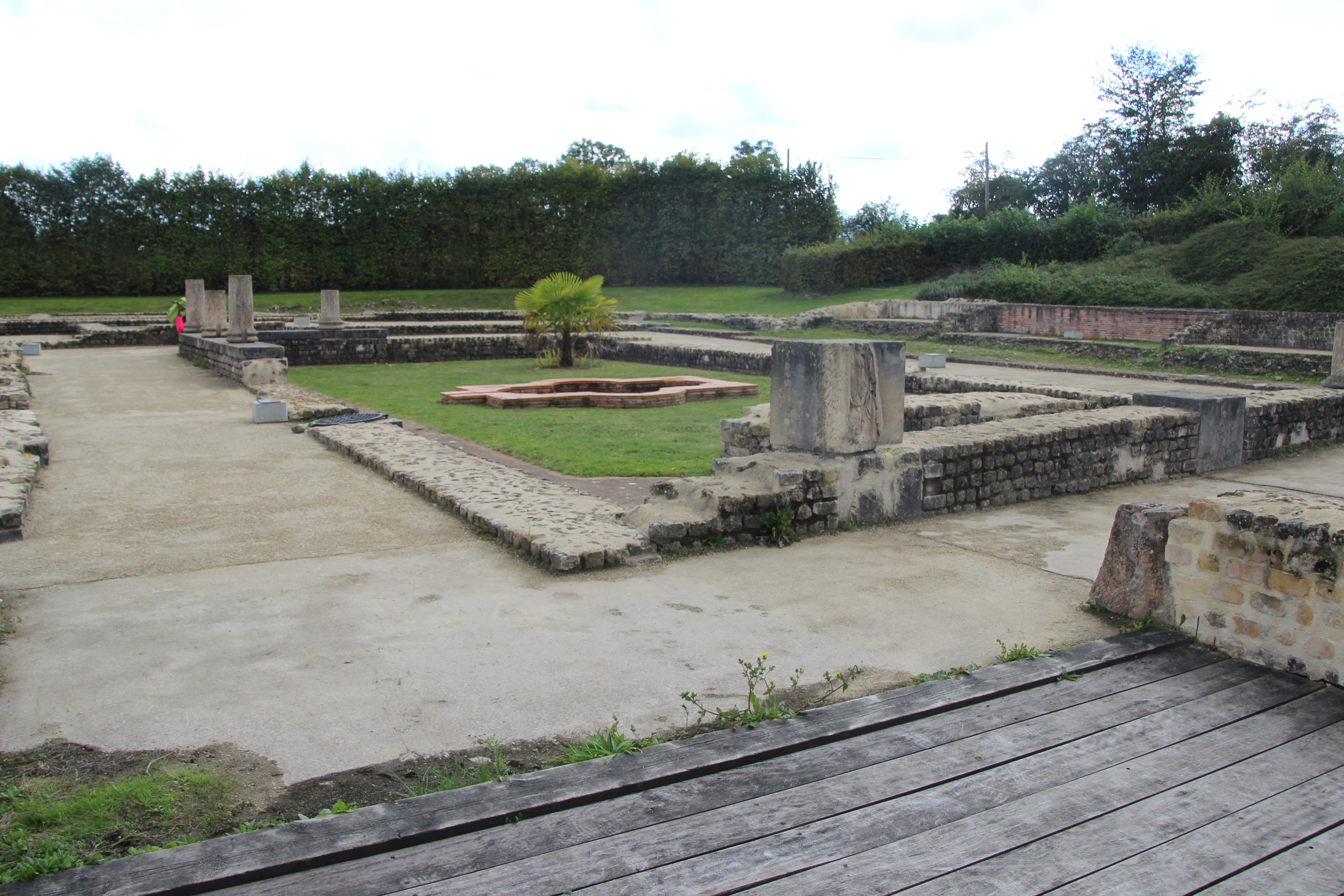
View of the west wing and the pool from a utility room.

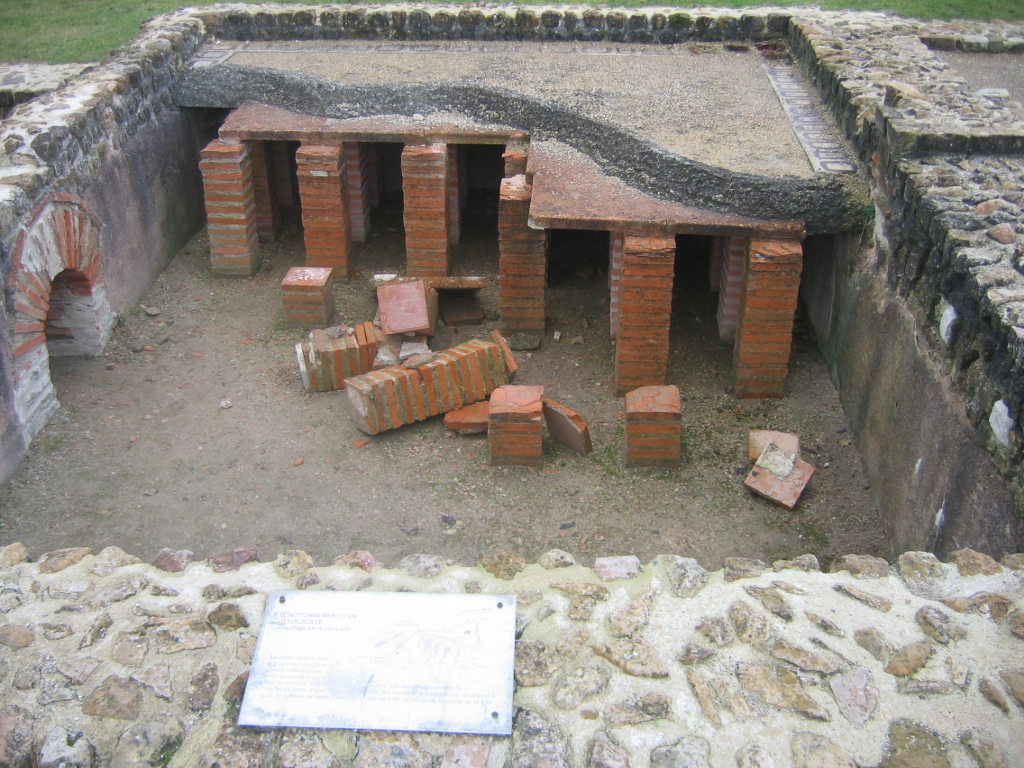
Hypocaust.

=== Theatre ===
The entertainment monument was initially constructed as a theatre and was transformed into an arena during the 2nd century.The structure was first cleared between 1852 and 1854, but was covered again shortly afterward. In 2001, it was uncovered once more during work carried out for the creation of the museum's parking area.

=== Baths and gymnasium ===
The baths are situated in the southern part of the Roman city.Initial elements of the baths and the gymnasium were uncovered in the 18th century by Nicolas-Joseph Foucault. Excavations on the baths continued into the 19th century, (Note: Jardel, Lelièvre & Mazure 2014, p. 170) after which the site was reburied.

== Description ==
Modern map of the entire site of Vieux-la-Romaine.

The museum includes two restored Gallo-Roman villas: the house with the U-shaped courtyard and the house with the large peristyle.

The main building has a contemporary design, featuring colonnades and wooden claustras that reference the Roman period. Portions of the façade incorporate glass and concrete to reflect modern architectural elements. Pompeian-style gardens are located adjacent to the building. The museum comprises several rooms, with the permanent exhibition covering 650 m².

The first room focuses on the development and layout of the ancient city of Aregenua. It features a model reconstructing the city during the Roman period, the decorated columns from the house with the large peristyle, and a Gallo-Roman statue known as the tutela.

The second room presents the decoration of the house with the large peristyle and the various rooms of the domus. Exhibits include wall paintings, such as a panel depicting Achilles receiving his weapons from the Nereid Thetis, and a fresco featuring fish.

Other rooms display a stratigraphic section of the excavations and objects from daily life, including well-preserved ceramics. A reconstruction of a Carolingian-period farm is also included.

The museum employs a variety of methods to present the Roman period to visitors, including models, staged displays, handling and restored objects, investigative trails, and reconstructions. Most exhibits are accompanied by English translations.

Following its inauguration, the museum was directed by Béatrice Labat and subsequently by Xavier Savary. It receives approximately 25,000 visitors annually.

Items on display in the various rooms

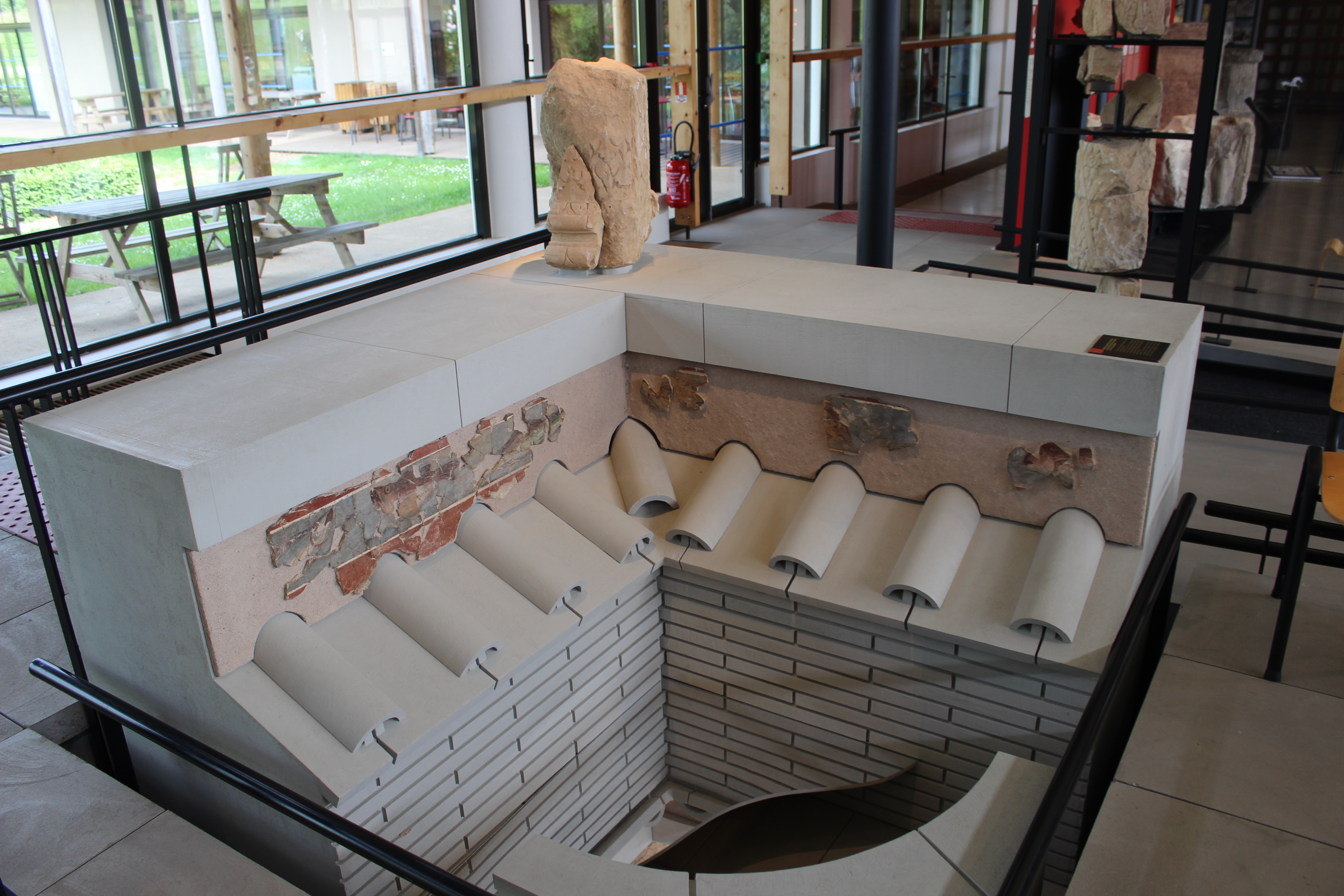
Partial reconstruction of the fish fresco based on archaeological discoveries.

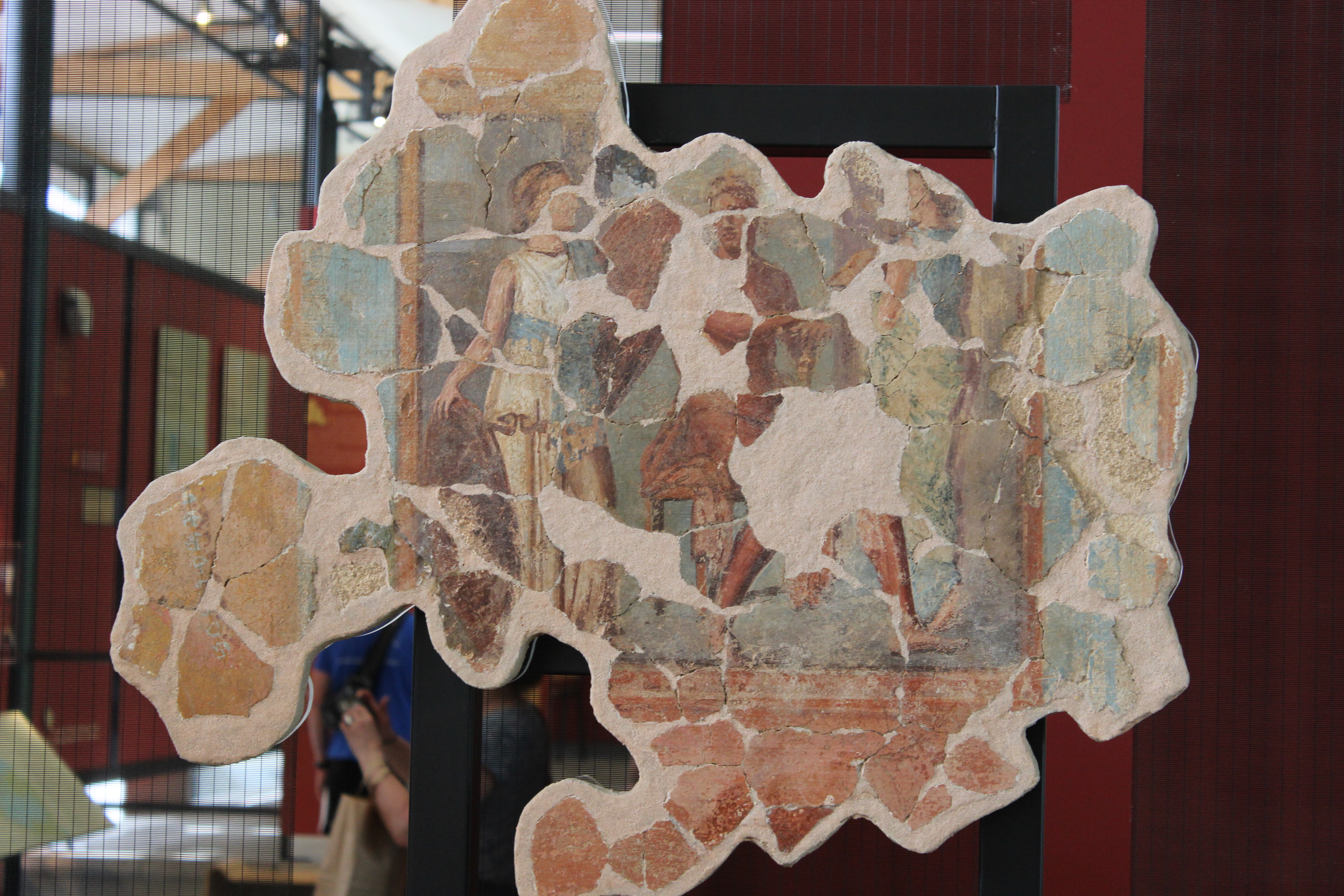
Greek mythological fresco showing the Nereid Thetis on the left giving her weapons to Achilles on the right.

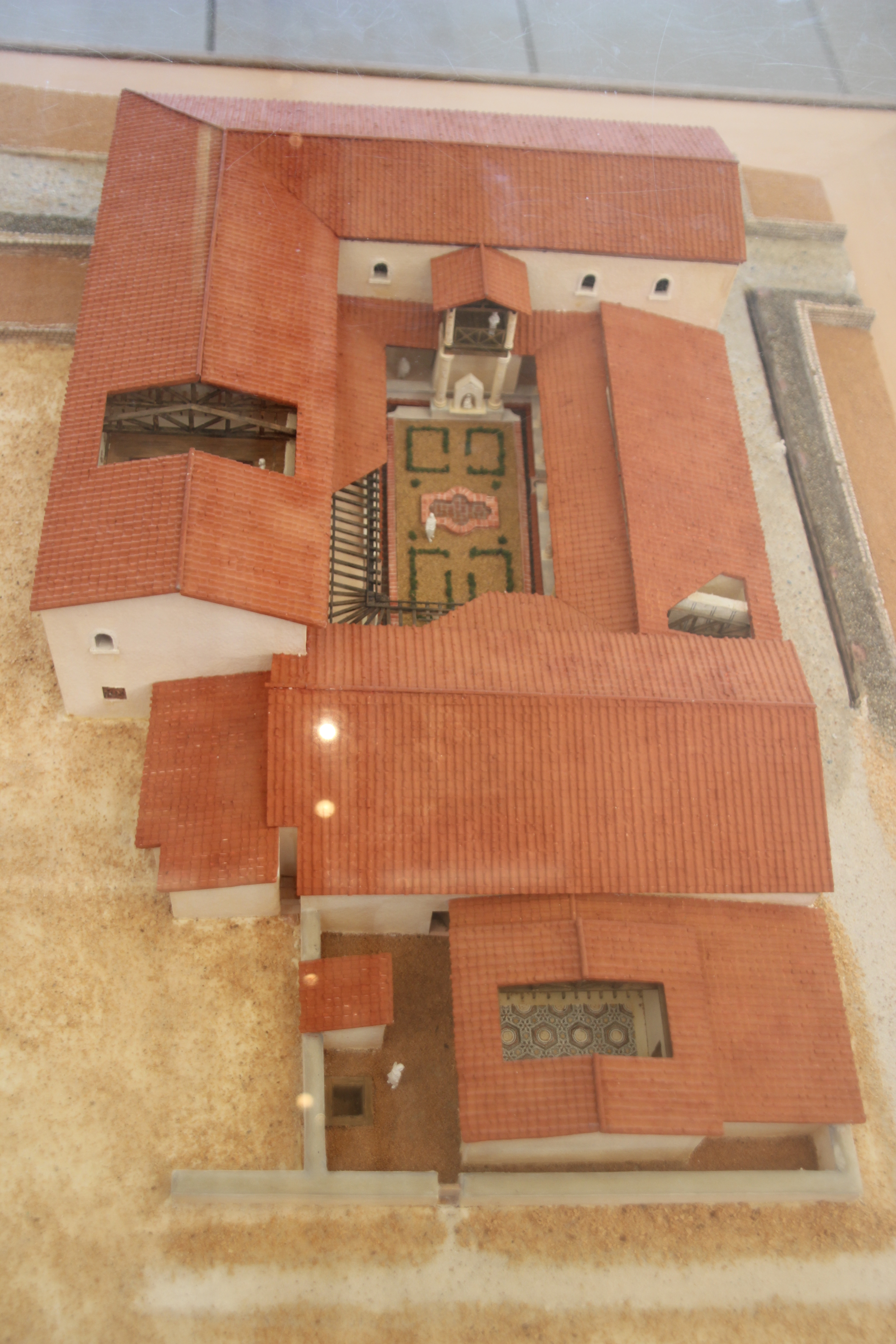
Model reconstructing the house with a large peristyle.

=== Collections ===
In 2022, the museum housed more than 4,000 objects, including around 1,000 items in storage and 3,580 lapidary elements illustrating the history of the settlement and its inhabitants. The collections focus on daily life and include reconstructed colonnades, as well as paintings and mosaics.

==== Notable elements ====
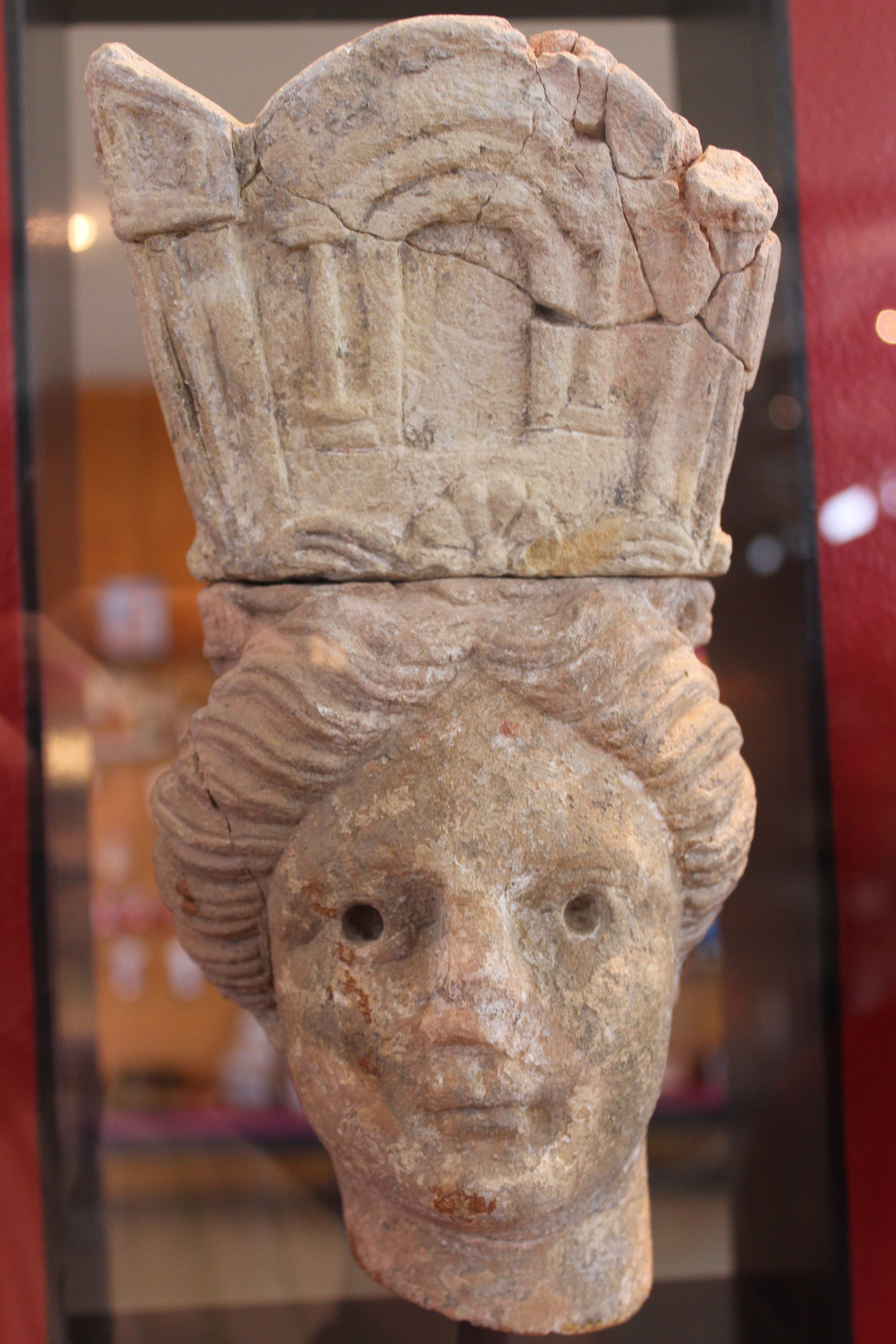
The Tutela of Vieux-la-Romaine, symbol of the city according to archaeologists, found during excavations of the villa with the large peristyle

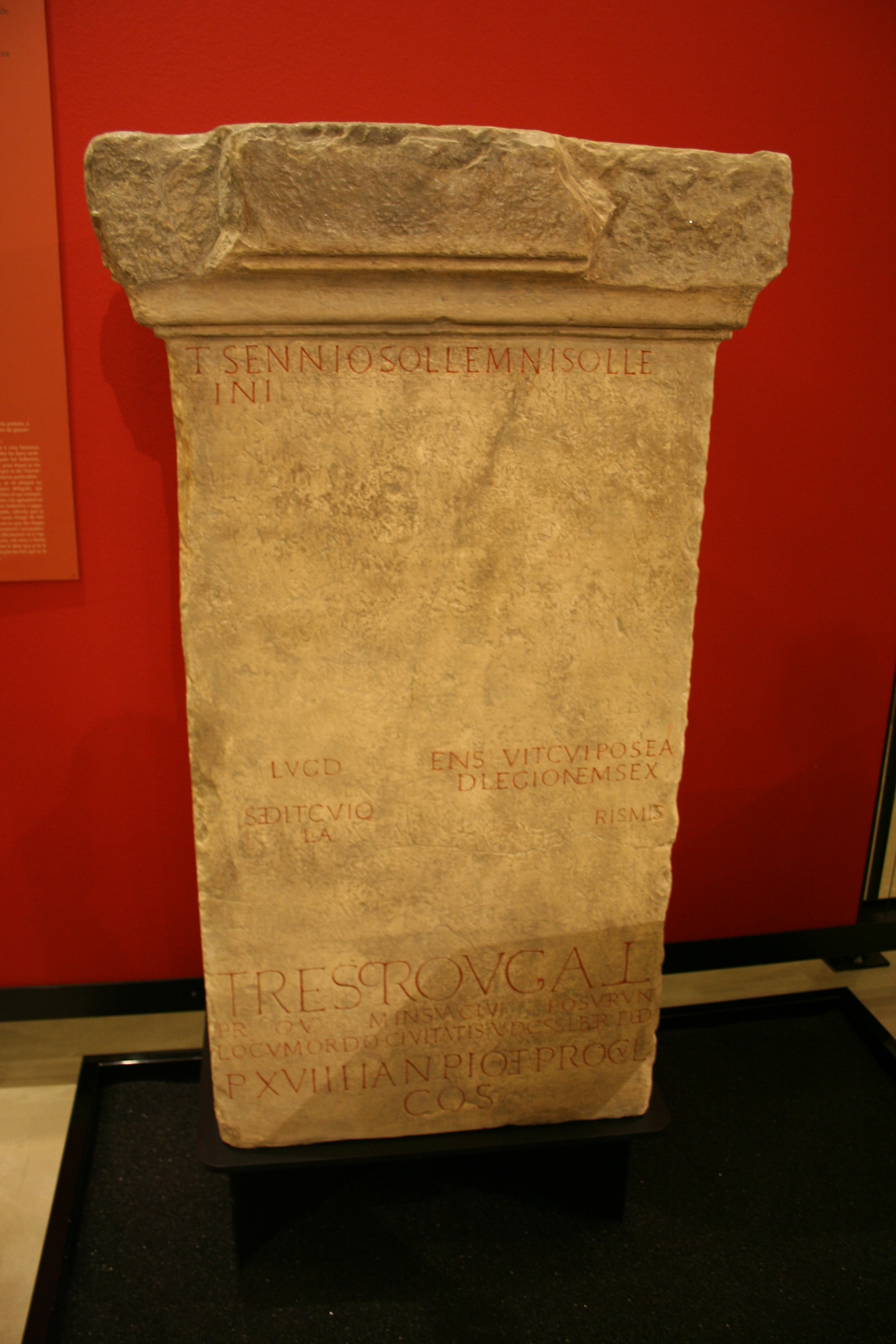
Copy of the Thorigny Marble

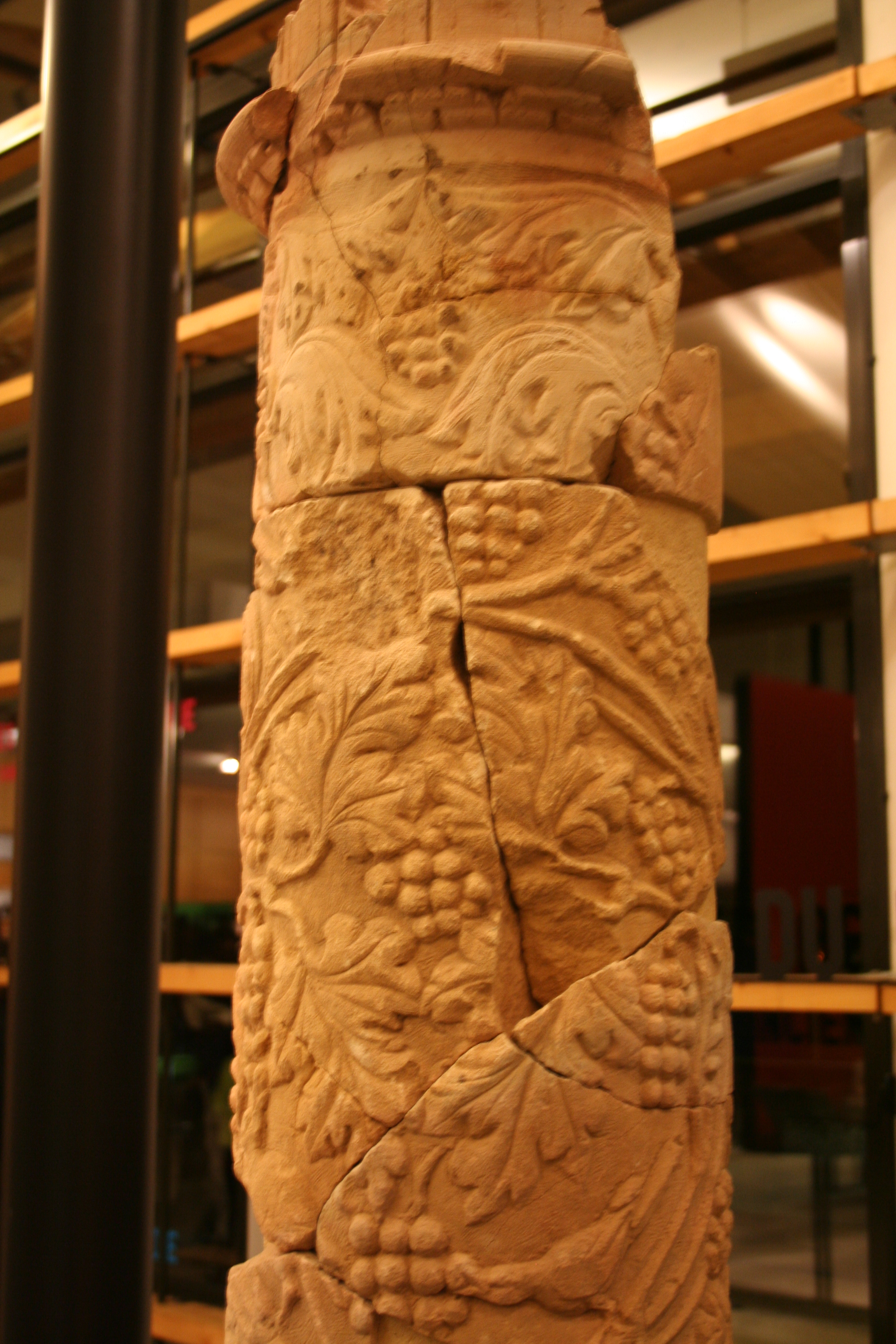
One of the columns of the villa with the large peristyle

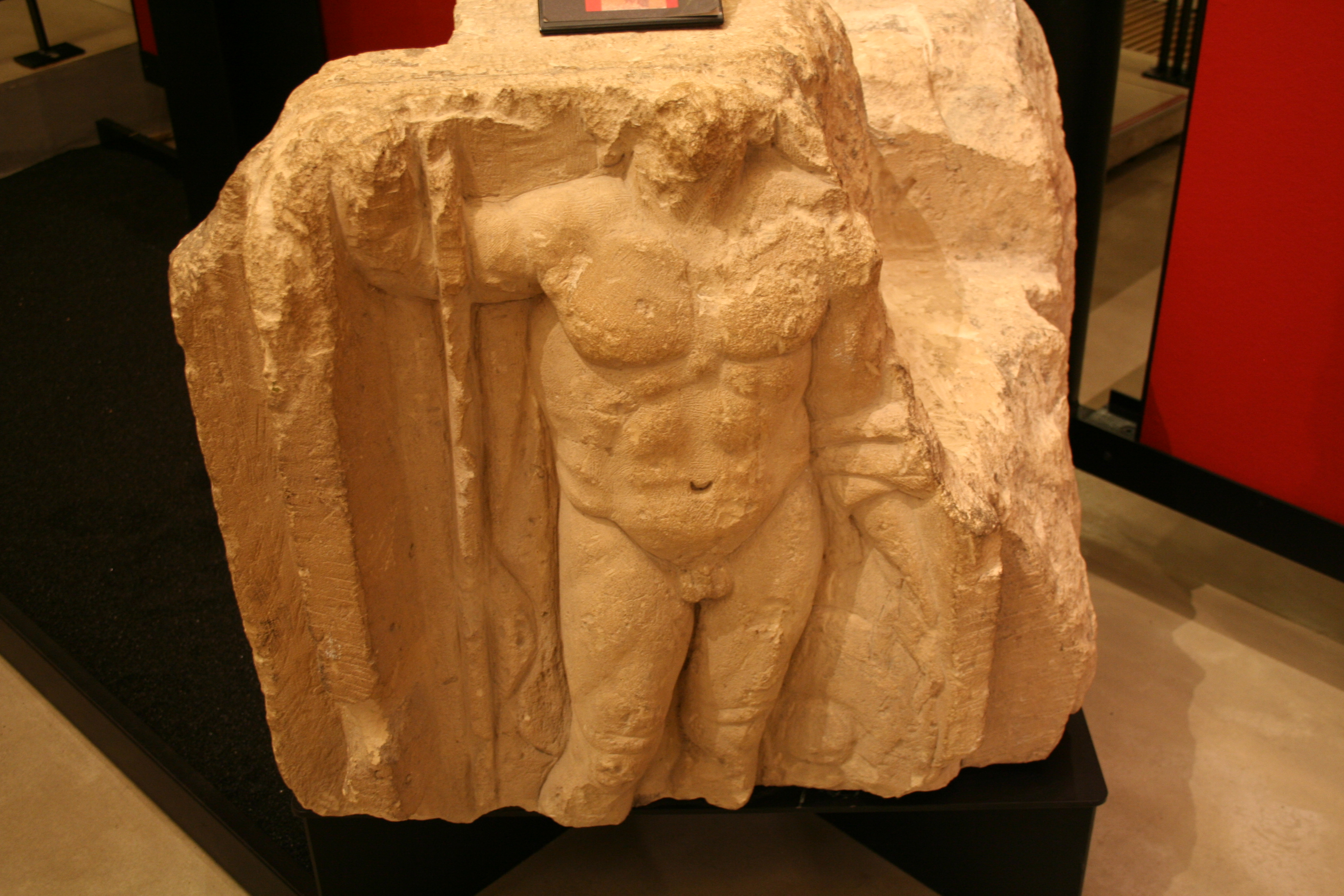
Mars

==== Columns of the house with the large peristyle ====
The sculpted columns from the house with the large peristyle are exhibited in Room 1 of the museum.

==== Thorigny marble ====
The Thorigny marble was uncovered in 1580. It commemorates the career of the city magistrate Titus Sennius Sollemnis and his associates.A copy of the Thorigny marble is exhibited in Room 1 of the Vieux Museum, while the original is held by the Saint-Lô Museum.

==== Tripod ====
The Giberville tripod was discovered either in 1812 in a garden near the public fountain or in 1829 near the Church of Saint-Martin, Giberville. It was acquired by Gervais de La Rue for the Society of Antiquaries of Normandy and moved to Caen, where it was kept in the Pavilion of learned societies. Following the establishment of the Museum of Antique Dealers of Normandy, the tripod was transferred there in 1864, catalogued as inventory number 242, and displayed in the "tripod room" on the first floor. On 12 September 1983, it was moved to the Museum of Normandy in Caen under inventory number D.S.A.N. 83-759. In 2024, it was deposited at the Vieux Archaeological Museum.

The tripod measures 0.93 m in height and is designed to be foldable and portable. Its legs feature cross-bracing forming isosceles triangles. The basin at the top of the tripod is a modern reconstruction.

Giberville tripod

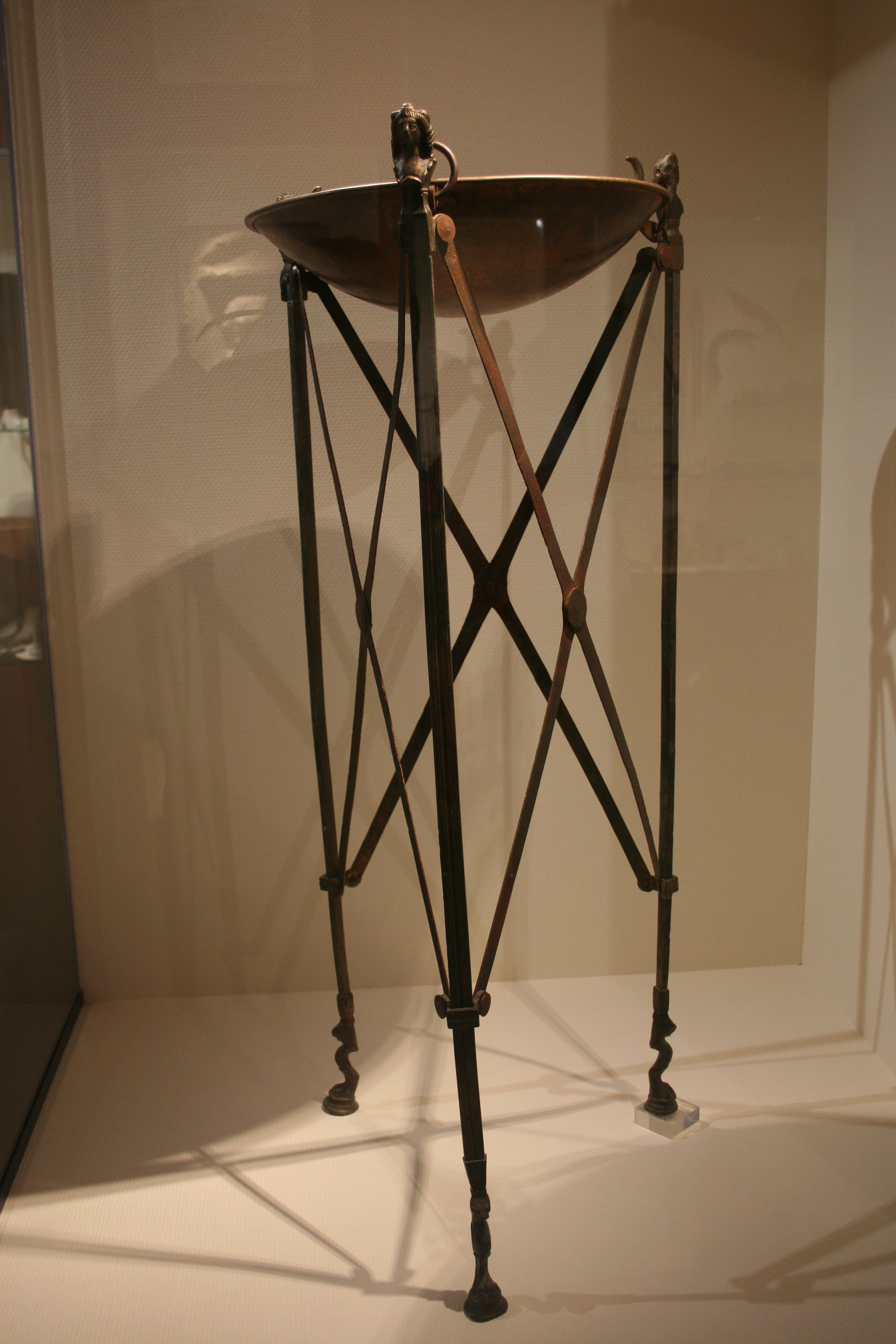
Exhibited at the Normandy Museum between September 12, 1983, and early 2024.

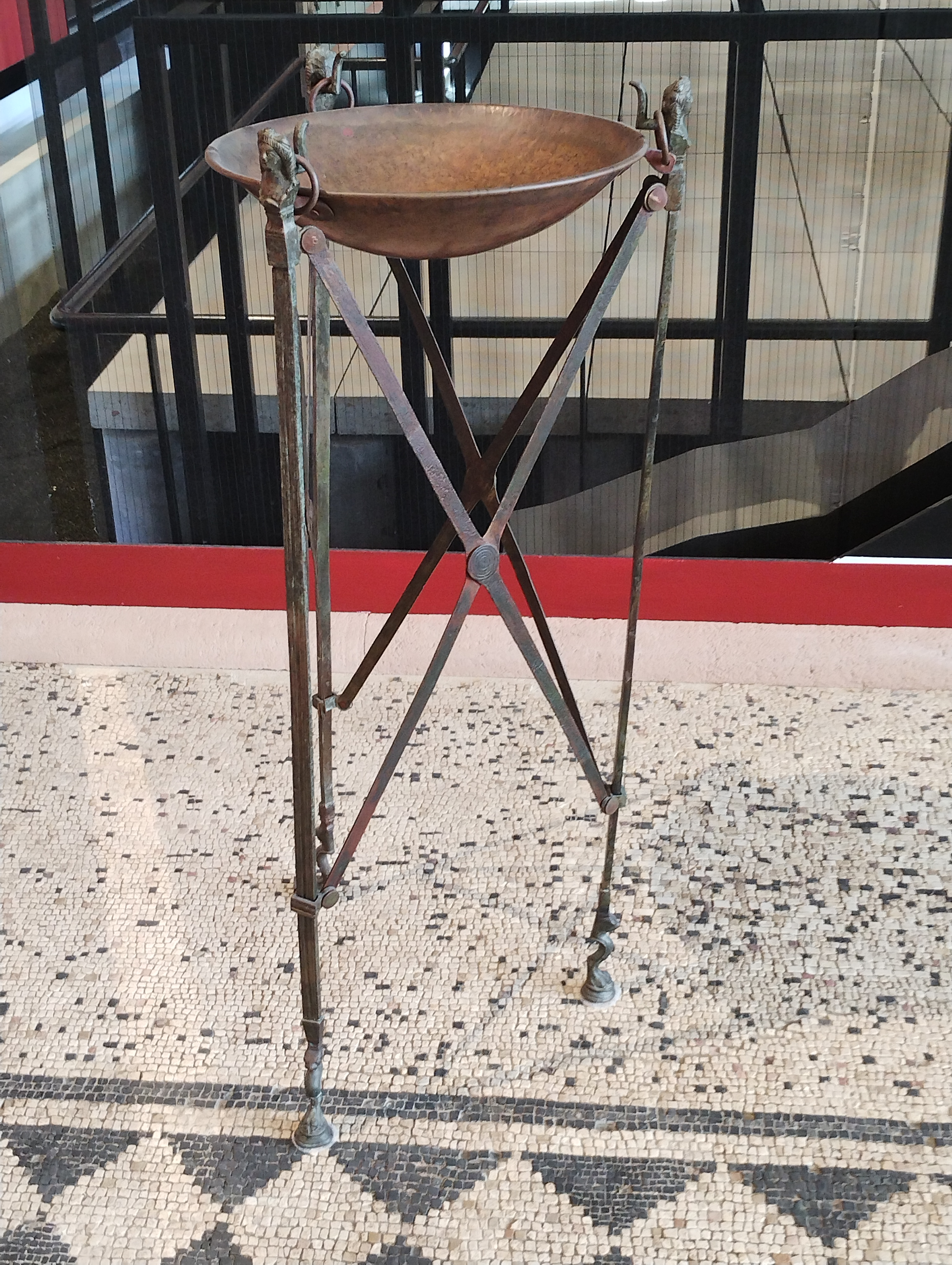
Exhibited at the Vieux Museum since 2024.

Diagram.

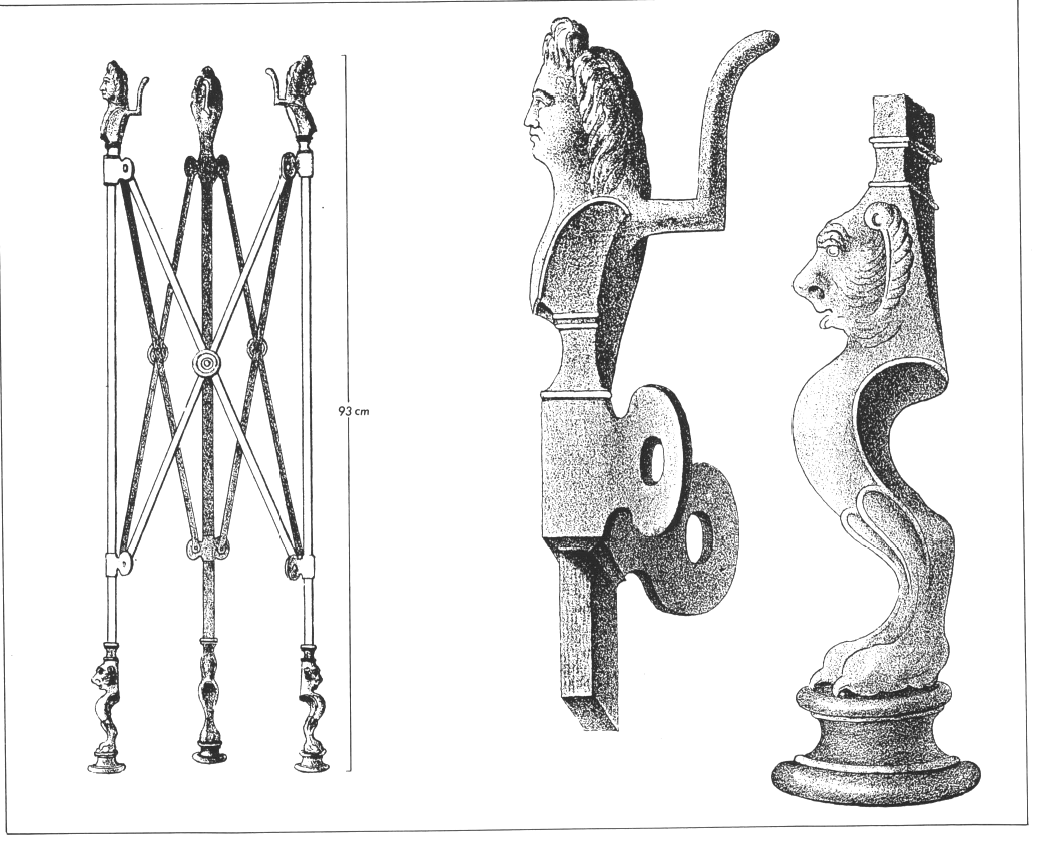
Engraving by Amédée Léchaudé d'Anisy in the 19th century.

==== Tutela ====
A Gallo-Roman statue, known as a tutela, is displayed in Room 1 of the museum. It originates from the reception room of the house with the large peristyle.

== See also ==
- History of Normandy
- Viducasses
- Forum of Vieux-la-Romaine
- U-shaped courtyard house in Vieux-la-Romaine
- List of museums in Upper Normandy

== Bibliography ==
=== Bibliography on the locality ===
- Bertin, Dominique (1977). "La topographie de Vieux - Araegenuae (Calvados), capitale de la cité des Viducasses, d'après les fouilles anciennes et les sondages récents" [The topography of Vieux-Araegenuae (Calvados), capital of the Viducasses tribe, based on ancient excavations and recent surveys]. Annales de Normandie (in French) (27/2): 131–150.
- Bouet, Pierre; Neveux, François (2006). "Un exemple d'échec urbain en Gaule Lyonnaise : Aregenua, chef-lieu des Viducasses (Vieux, Calvados)" [An example of urban failure in Gallia Lugdunensis: Aregenua, capital of the Viducasses (Vieux, Calvados)]. Les Villes normandes au Moyen Âge (in French): 29–44.
- Delaval, Éric (2004). "Vieux / Aregenua (Calvados)". Capitales éphémères. Des Capitales de cités perdent leur statut dans l'Antiquité tardive, Actes du colloque Tours 6-8 mars 2003 [Ephemeral capitals. City capitals lose their status in late antiquity, Proceedings of the symposium held in Tours on March 6-8, 2003] (in French).
- Delaval, Éric (2006). "Vieux, antique Aregenua : actualité de la recherche" [Old, ancient Aregenua: current research]. Revue archéologique (in French) (1): 215–220.
- Fichet de Clairefontaine, François; Delaval, Éric; Hincker, Vincent; Le Maho, Jacques (2004). "Capitales déchues de la Normandie antique. État de la question" [Fallen capitals of ancient Normandy. Current status]. Capitales éphémères (in French) (25): 141–155.
- Jardel, Karine; Lelièvre, Jean-Yves; Mazure, Pierre (2014). "Le forum et la curie d'Aregenua (Vieux, Calvados): Bilan sur les découvertes anciennes et les recherches récentes" [The forum and curia of Aregenua (Vieux, Calvados): Review of ancient discoveries and recent research]. Gallia (in French). 71 (2): 163–188.
- Jardel, Karine; Lelièvre, Jean-Yves; Schütz, Grégory (2007). "Vieux – Le Champ des Crêtes" [Old – The Field of Ridges]. ADLFI. Archéologie de la France (in French).
- Jardel, Karine; Boislève, Julien; Tendron, Graziella (2012). "Aménagement et décor de la curie du forum d'Aregenua (Vieux, Calvados)" [Layout and decor of the curia of the Aregenua forum (Vieux, Calvados)]. Décor des édifices publics, civils et religieux en Gaule durant l'Antiquité (in French). Association des Publications Chauvinoises: 91–110.
- Pilet, Christian (1984). "Vieux antique (Araegenuae, Viducasses)" [Ancient old (Araegenuae, Viducasses)]. Revue archéologique de l'ouest (in French). 1 (1): 63–84. doi:10.3406/rao.1984.861.
- Departmental Archaeology Service (2015). "Vieux-la-Romaine, nouvelles découvertes et reconstitutions Viducasses)" [Vieux-la-Romaine, new discoveries and reconstructions]. Archéologia (in French) (535): 62–67. ISSN 0570-6270.
- Vipard, Pascal (1998). La maison du « Bas de Vieux » une riche habitation romaine du quartier des thermes d'Aregenua (Vieux, Calvados) [The house of "Bas de Vieux," a rich Roman residence in the Aregenua thermal baths district (Vieux, Calvados)] (in French). ISBN 2950649610.
- Vipard, Pascal (2002). La cité d'Aregenua (Vieux, Calvados); chef-lieu des Viducasses. État des connaissances [The city of Aregenua (Vieux, Calvados); capital of the Viducasses. State of knowledge] (in French). ISBN 9782913993051.

=== Bibliography on the museum ===
- Fresnais, Marianne; Charroux, Honorine (2022). Le musée départemental de Vieux-la-Romaine a 20 ans ! [The Vieux-la-Romaine departmental museum is 20 years old!] (in French). Conseil Départemental du Calvados.
- Kerébel, Hervé (2000). Fouille de sauvetage programmée à l'emplacement du musée départemental d'archéologie du Calvados, Vieux, parcelles AE 44 et 156 [Rescue excavation planned at the site of the Calvados Departmental Museum of Archaeology, Vieux, plots AE 44 and 156] (in French). Service Départemental d'Archéologique du Calvados.
- Calvados Departmental Archaeology Service (2006). Vieux-la-Romaine : musée et sites archéologiques [Vieux-la-Romaine: museum and archaeological sites] (in French).
- SFAC (2006). "Excursion à Vieux (Calvados) 18 juin 2005" [Excursion to Vieux (Calvados) June 18, 2005]. Revue Archéologique (in French): 214. ISSN 0035-0737. JSTOR 41933767.
- "Un musée archéologique unique en son genre : le site de Vieux-la-Romaine a ouvert ses portes" [A unique archaeological museum: the Vieux-la-Romaine site has opened its doors]. Le Journal du Calvados (in French) (65): 17–19. 2002.
- "Vieux-la-Romaine : le musée et sites archéologiques" [Vieux-la-Romaine: the museum and archaeological sites]. Patrimoine normand (in French) (74). 2010.

=== Temporary exhibitions and events ===
- Baudry, Anna; Barbier-Pain, Delphine; Neveu, Elsa; Granai, Salomé; Beauchamp, Axel (2016). Exposition Pays'Âges : La Plaine de Caen à travers les âges [Pays'Âges Exhibition: The Caen Plain through the ages] (in French). Vieux-la-Romaine: Musée de Vieux-la-Romaine.
- Boislève, Julien (2011). Haut en couleur ! La fresque à l'époque romaine [Colorful! Frescoes in Roman times] (in French).
- Dasen, Véronique (2017). 13-14 octobre 2017. Caen (Mémorial/Vieux la Romaine) : Regards croisés sur le jeu à travers les âges et les civilisations : de l'objet à la pratique [October 13-14, 2017. Caen (Memorial/Vieux la Romaine): Different perspectives on games through the ages and civilizations: from objects to practices] (in French).
- Girod, Virginie (2015). La cuisine dans l'Antiquité romaine, conférence dégustation [Cooking in Ancient Rome, tasting lecture] (in French).
- Collectif (2013). "Expositions et animations" [Exhibitions and events]. Bulletin de la Société préhistorique française (in French). 110 (2): 378–379.

=== Others ===
- de Caumont, Arcisse (1850). Statistique monumentale du Calvados [Monumental statistics for Calvados] (in French). Vol. II.
- Delacampagne, Florence (1990). Carte archéologique de la Gaule [Archeological map of Gaul] (in French). Vol. 14: Le Calvados. Paris: Éd. de la Maison des sciences de l'homme. ISBN 2-87754-011-1.
- Gervais, Charles (1864). Musée de la société des antiquaires de Normandie : catalogue et description des objets d'art de l'antiquité, du Moyen Âge, de la Renaissance et des temps modernes exposés au musée [Museum of the Society of Antiquarians of Normandy: catalog and description of antique, medieval, Renaissance, and modern art objects on display at the museum] (in French).
- de La Rue, Gervais (1833). "Note sur des objets antiques découverts dans la commune de Giberville près Caen" [Note on ancient objects discovered in the municipality of Giberville near Caen]. Mémoires de la Société des Antiquaires de Normandie (in French). VI: 362–365.
- Marin, Jean-Yves (1987). "Les collections de la Société des Antiquaires de Normandie au Musée de Normandie de Caen" [The collections of the Society of Antiquaries of Normandy at the Normandy Museum in Caen]. Revue archéologique de l'Ouest (in French) (4–4): 153–155.
- Marin, Jean-Yves (2001). Musée de Normandie Caen : guide [Normandy Museum Caen: guide] (in French). Genève and Milan: Skira and Seuil. ISBN 88-8118-913-5. OCLC 491340818.
- Musset, Lucien (1965). "Historique sommaire du Musée des antiquaires (1824-1963)" [Brief history of the Museum of Antiquities (1824–1963)]. B.S.A.N. (in French). 57. Archived from the original on January 7, 2016.
- Pilet, Christian; Alduc-Le Bagousse, Armelle; Blondiaux, Joël; Buchet, Luc; Grévin, Gilles; Pilet-Lemière, Jacqueline (1990). "Les nécropoles de Giberville (Calvados) fin du Ve siècle - fin du VIIe siècle ap. J.C." [The necropolises of Giberville (Calvados) late 5th century - late 7th century AD.]. Archéologie médiévale (in French) (20): 3–140.
- Rioult, Michel; Vipard, Pascal (1999). "L'utilisation de la pierre dans la demeure gallo-romaine de Vieux" [The use of stone in the Gallo-Roman residence of Vieux]. L'exploitation ancienne des roches dans le Calvados : histoire et archéologie [The ancient exploitation of rocks in Calvados: history and archaeology] (in French). pp. 188–203.
- Vipard, Pascal (1990). "Une statue récemment découverte à Vieux (Calvados)" [A statue recently discovered in Vieux (Calvados)]. Gallia (in French). 47: 251–255. doi:10.3406/galia.1990.2910. Archived from the original on January 7, 2016.
