= Gallo-Roman theater of Vieux =

Gallo-Roman theatre of Vieux
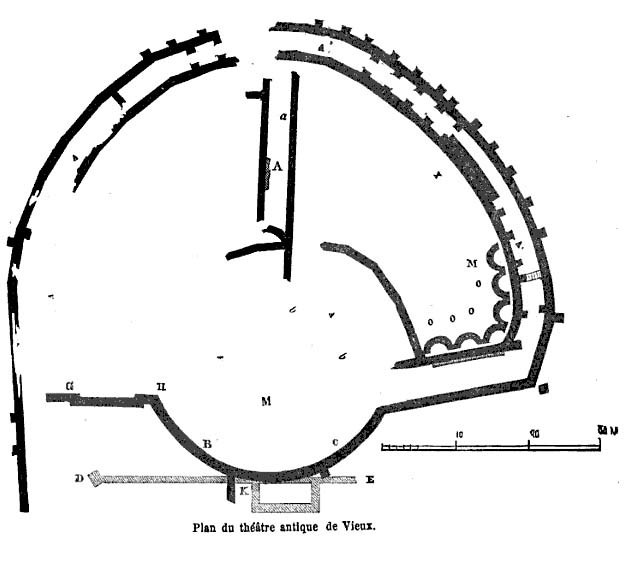
- Plan of the theatre drawn during excavations carried out in the 19th century (north is in the upper-left corner of the drawing).
- Location: Vieux, Calvados, Normandy, France

Monument historique
- Type: Registered and classified
- Designated: 1980

The Gallo-Roman theatre of Vieux is an entertainment building located within the archaeological site of Vieux-la-Romaine, ancient Aregenua, situated about 10 kilometres (6.2 mi) south of Caen, in the French department of Calvados, Normandy.

The site of Vieux has been the subject of organized archaeological excavations since the late 17th century. However, as early as the late 16th century, the famous statue base known as the marble of Thorigny was discovered there. Excavations confirmed that the site was indeed the Roman city of Aregenua, capital of the Viducasses, founded in the 1st century and reached its peak during the 2nd and 3rd centuries. During this period, the city acquired monumental architecture, including an entertainment building, reflecting the adoption of the Roman way of life by the local population.

The city declined rapidly, losing its status as an administrative capital at an unknown date prior to the beginning of the 5th century. A process of ruralization gradually erased distinctions between the former city and other settlements in the Caen plain before the end of the Merovingian dynasty.

Excavated in the mid-19th century by the Société des antiquaires de Normandie, the structure was rediscovered during excavations in the early 21st century, but these later investigations were superficial and did not significantly improve upon the findings of the 19th century, which remain the basis of current knowledge about the monument. Although not visible today, the remains lie at a very shallow depth, and a mound marks their presence near the visitor parking area of the site museum.

== Location ==
Simplified plan of Aregenua.

The present-day commune of Vieux lies approximately 10 kilometres (6.2 mi) southwest of Caen, (Note: Pascal Vipard, 2006, p. 29.) and 20 kilometres (12 mi) from the English Channel, (Note: Delacampagne, 1990, p. 79.) on the slope of the northern bank of the Guigne, a tributary of the Orne. (Note: Jardel, Quévillon, Germain-Vallée, Jeanne, Paez-Rezende and Schütz, 2015, p. 8 (Ar7).)

The entertainment building, located in the northwestern part of the ancient city on “a gently southward-sloping hillside”, (Note: Vipard, 2002, p. 31.) stands 150 metres (490 ft) from the present-day locality known as Le Jardin Poulain (Note: Delacampagne, 1990, p. 82.) and east of the Château de la Palue. (Note: Bertin, 1977, p. 133.) The area corresponded to plots 343 and 346 in section B during the mid-19th-century excavations. (Note: Charma, 1855, p. 22.) According to Antoine Charma, (Note: Charma, 1855, p. 28.) this sector formed part of the northeastern suburb of the ancient city, a view also supported by Dominique Bertin. (Note: Bertin, 1977, p. 135.)

In the same sector of the ancient city stands the House with a U-shaped courtyard, an urban residence more modest than the very wealthy House with the Grand Peristyle in Vieux-la-Romaine, and which has been carefully presented following excavation. The house with a U-shaped courtyard included both a workshop and shops facing the street. (Note: Delaval, 2004, p. 498.)

== History ==
=== Early history of the site ===
==== City of the Viducasses ====
Map of Roman cities and civic capitals in northwestern present-day France during the Early Roman Empire.

Aregenua, capital of the Viducasses, one of the peoples of Gallia Lugdunensis, occupying the present-day Caen Plain, was founded in the 1st century. The territory of the Viducasses has been estimated at 2,300 square kilometres (890 sq mi). (Note: Hincker, 2007, p. 4.) The presence of the Gallic sanctuary of Baron-sur-Odon may have influenced the choice of the site. According to historian and archaeologist Dominique Bertin (1948–1986), “the assimilation of the Viducasses into the Empire was rather slow”. (Note: Bertin, 1977, p. 132.) The city experienced major monumental development around 120–140, notably with a public building at the Champ des Crêtes and possibly the theatre, alongside improvements in the quality of private housing. (Note: Vipard, 2006, p. 32.) The city may have benefited from the privilege of immunitas, exempting it from land tax, as well as the status of a Latin-right municipality, a “privileged status” and a sign of the “success of Romanization,” according to Pascal Vipard, giving it “a prominent place” among neighboring communities.

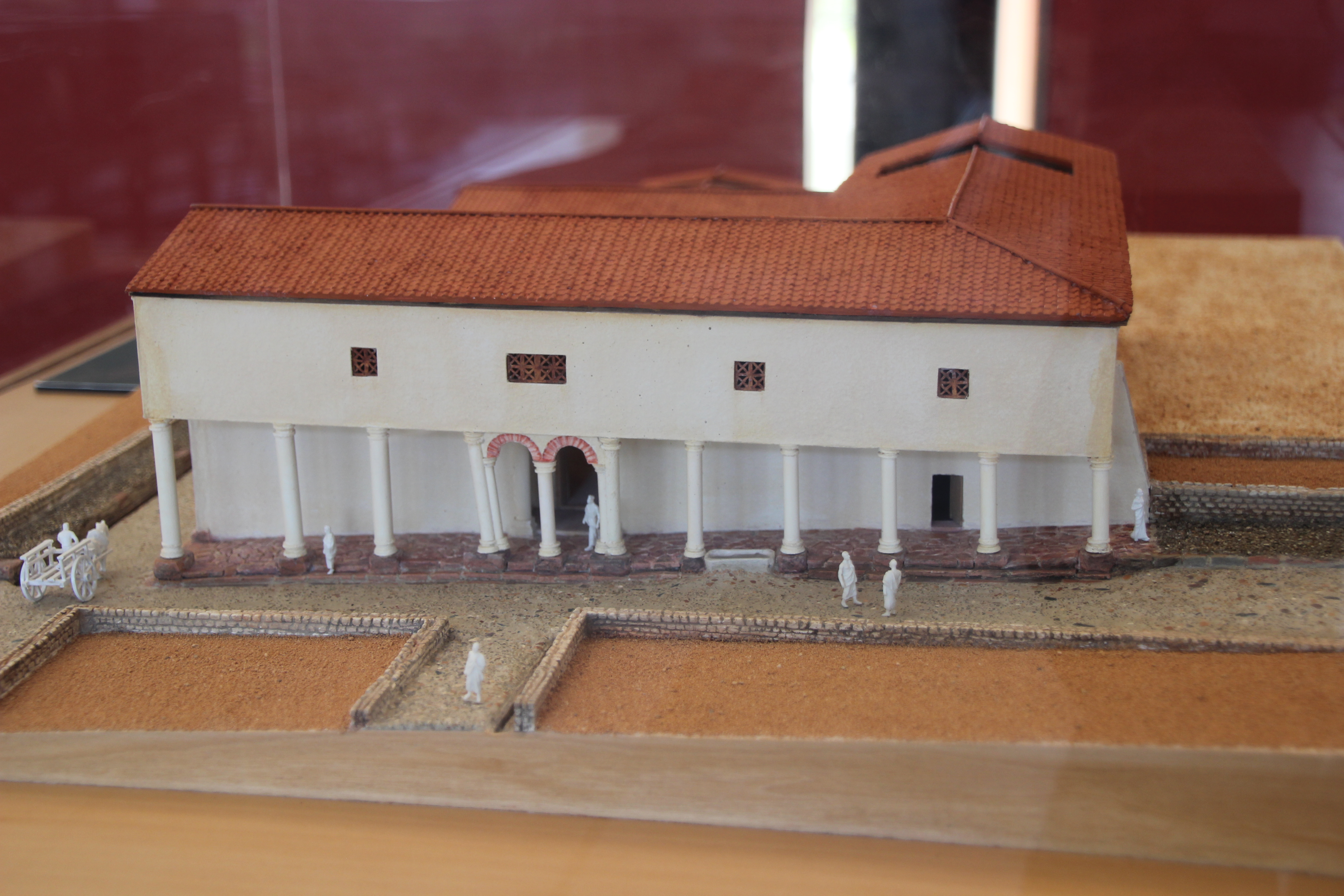
Model of the colonnade and front gallery of the House with the Grand Peristyle, viewed from the north.

The city expanded during the 2nd century with the development of a suburb. After reaching its peak in the 2nd and 3rd centuries, especially under the Severan dynasty, it was heavily affected by the crises that struck the Roman Empire during the 3rd century. Its zenith may be dated from the last of the Antonines to the reigns of the Gordians. Housing mainly consisted of wattle-and-daub and timber structures, except for more luxurious residences such as the House with the Grand Peristyle at Vieux-la-Romaine. (Note: Hincker, 2007, p. 5.)

Decline began in the early 3rd century. New construction ceased, reflecting “financial exhaustion” among local elites and possibly demographic decline. (Note: Vipard, 2006, p. 33.) Signs of euergetism by the ruling class disappeared. By the 3rd century, the city was known as Civitas Viducassium, according to the inscription on the Thorigny marble, (Note: Delaval, 2004, pp. 497–498.) discovered in 1588 and catalogued as CIL XIII, 3162. (Note: Matter, 1992, p. 32.) At its peak, the city covered 35 hectares (86 acres) and may have had a population of 5,000 to 6,000 inhabitants. T. Sennius Solemnis held civic and religious offices there for about twenty years between 220 and 238, including service as “delegate to the Council of the Gauls and high priest of Rome and Augustus”. Archaeological evidence also attests to the city’s integration into the short-lived Gallic Empire: an altar to Mars dedicated between 263 and 267.

Map of cities during the Late Roman Empire.

The eastern sector of the city was no longer active by the end of the 3rd century, reflecting “major disorganization”. Peripheral districts were no longer restored. An industry producing worked bone objects nevertheless survived, though archaeology indicates a more modest standard of living at the site of the domus of Bas de Vieux in the early 4th century. After the destruction, the city recovered somewhat in the early 4th century (Note: Delaval, 2004, p. 498.) under local authority, (Note: Vipard, 2006, pp. 33–34.) but unlike sites such as Jublains or Corseul, it was not fortified with defensive walls. Road works were nevertheless carried out within the city. The “recovery” of 289–325 corresponded to a “restoration of Roman power in the Empire” accompanied by “relative security”. (Note: Vipard, 2006, p. 34.) The city merged with Bayeux and disappeared “administratively” around 400. (Note: Delaval, 2004, p. 497.) Pascal Vipard suggests that it lost this status during the 4th century, although administrative records still mention it around 400; he links the loss of status to the administrative reforms of Diocletian. (Note: Vipard, 2006, pp. 34–36.) The event may also date to the creation of Lugdunensis Secunda between 364 and 388. (Note: Vipard, 2006, p. 42.) The merger may have been driven by a desire for “administrative efficiency”. (Note: Vipard, 2006, p. 37.) According to Vipard, the absence of city walls may also be related to this administrative transformation. Bayeux subsequently became a bishopric.

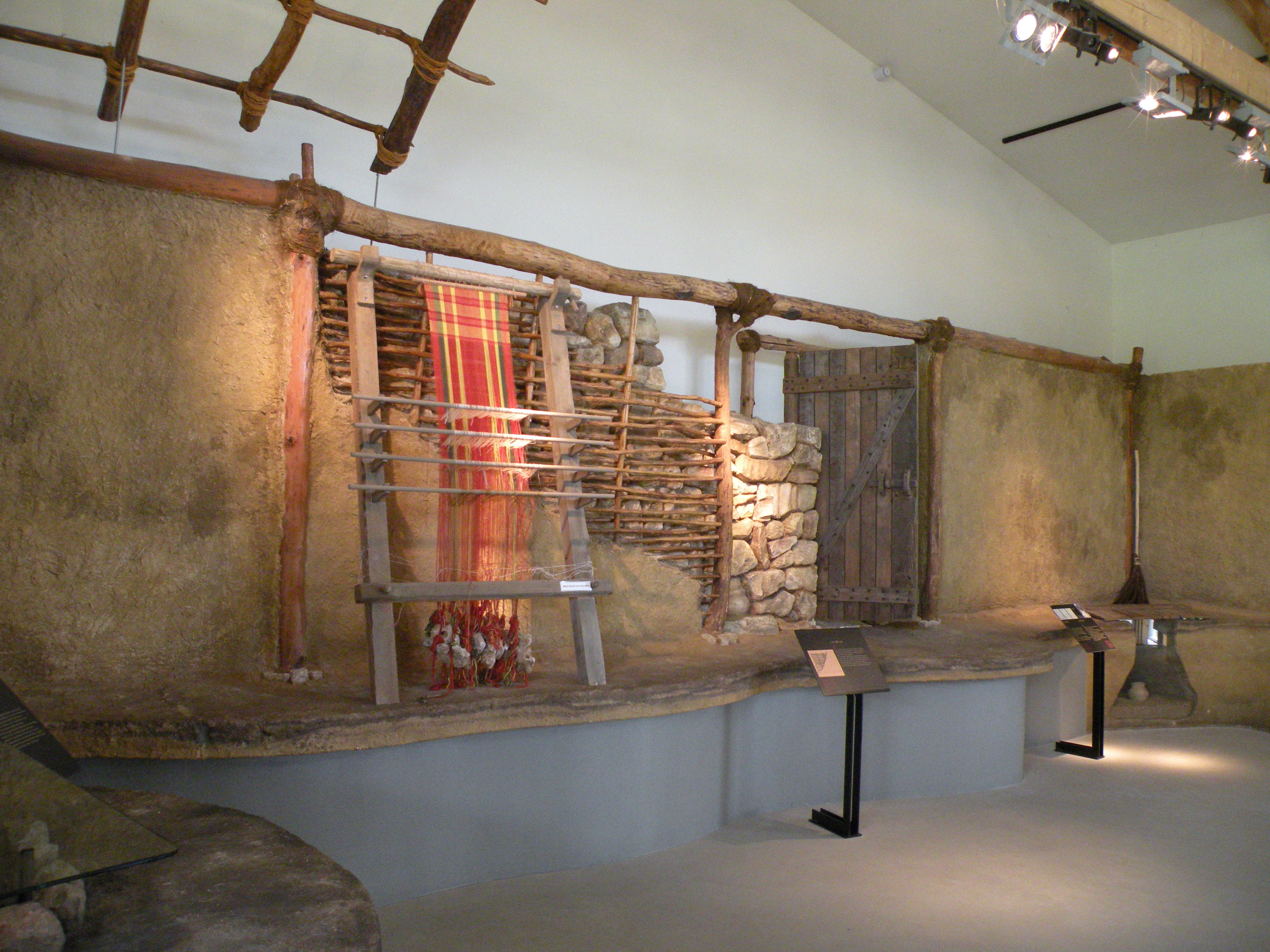
Reconstruction of a Carolingian-period dwelling excavated at Vieux, displayed in the site museum.

Although the city site remained occupied, a significant portion of the population appears to have moved to other urban centers or rural estates. Depopulation in favor of Bayeux or rural domains was offset by continued occupation during the 6th and 7th centuries. (Note: Vipard, 2006, p. 38.) Necropolises excavated near Vieux reveal population growth, possibly linked to the abandonment of the central site. (Note: Vipard, 2006, pp. 38–39.) The site nevertheless remained inhabited, and Christianity became established there in the 5th and 6th centuries; (Note: Vipard, 1998, p. 8.) (Note: Vipard, 2006, p. 39.) rare early Christian epigraphic remains have been discovered there. (Note: Hincker, 2007, pp. 25–26.) From the 12th century onward, the village developed around two places of worship dating from the Merovingian period, for a total of three churches, (Note: Hincker, 2007, p. 6.) originally established between the 7th and 8th centuries. (Note: Hincker, 2007, p. 7.) By the end of the 7th century, nothing distinguished the site of the former Roman city from other known rural settlements in the region. (Note: Hincker, 2007, p. 25.)

==== History of the Theatre District ====
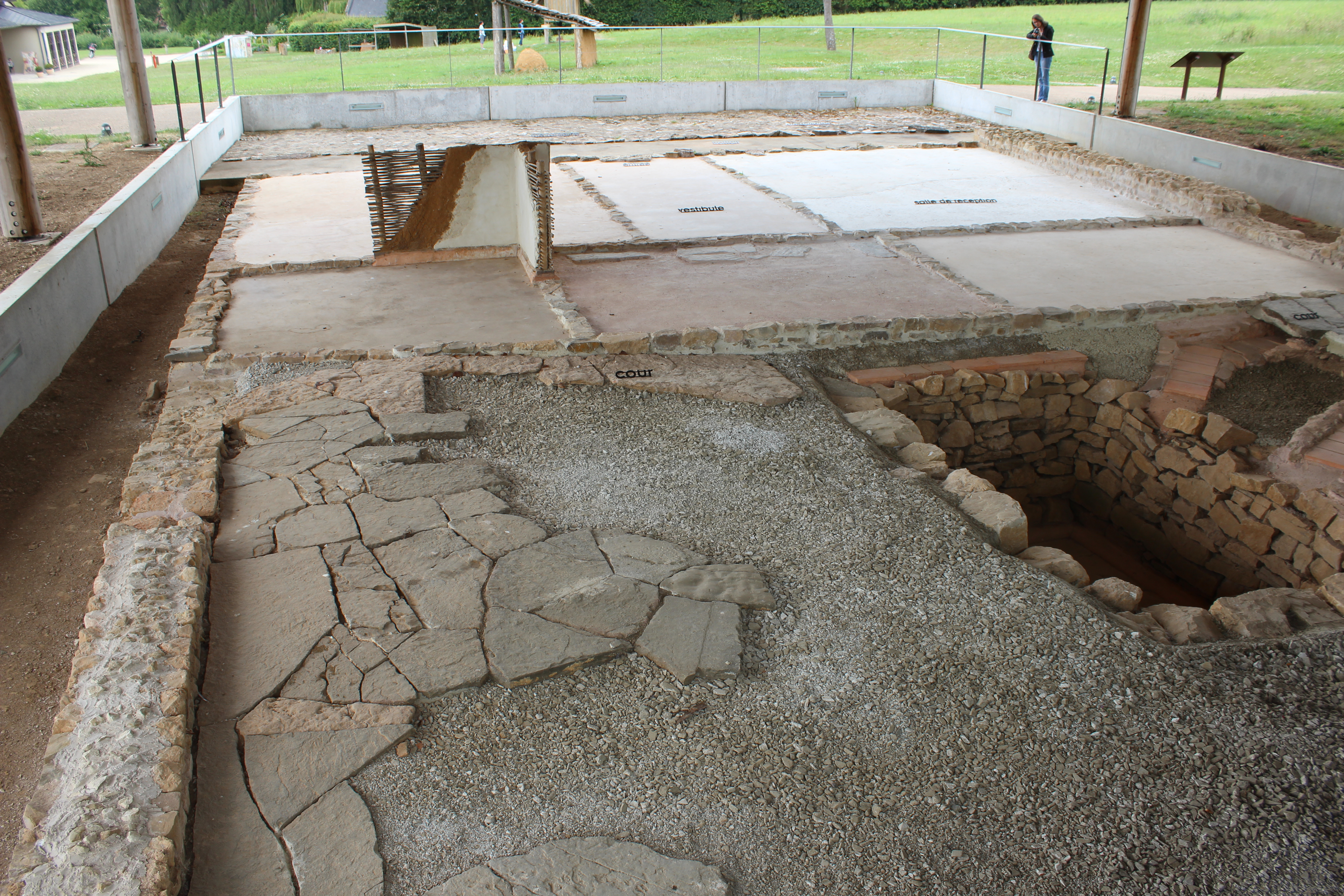
House with a U-shaped courtyard, in the ancient theatre district.

The theatre district remained poorly understood at the beginning of the 21st century. (Note: Vipard, 2002, p. 33.) This peripheral quarter of the city was the district of artisans; it is also where the ruins of the theatre were found. (Note: Jardel, Lelièvre and Rican, 2021, p. 36.) The area was mainly occupied by timber-framed buildings. (Note: Vipard, 2002, p. 30.)

A first entertainment building was constructed at the end of the 1st century or the beginning of the 2nd century. The theatre may have been built during the construction phase of the years 120–140. A few decades later, it was transformed into an arena building to accommodate amphitheatrical performances. A semicircular extension was added to the orchestra. (Note: Deniaux, Lorren, Bauduin and Jarry, 2002, p. 113.)

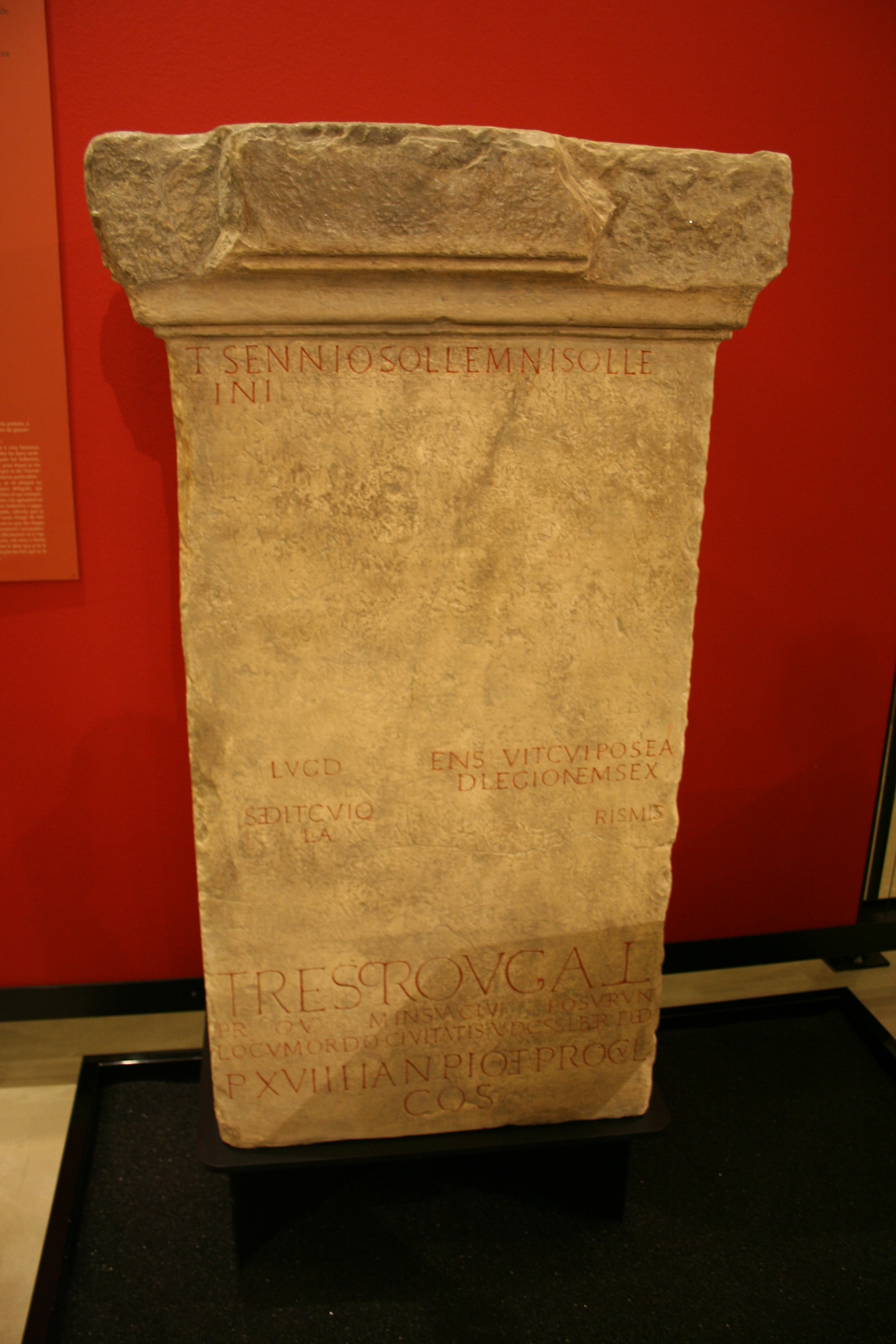
Replica of the pedestal in the Vieux-la-Romaine Archaeological Museum.

This transformation may have occurred in the middle (Note: Sear, 2006, p. 223.) or at the end of the 2nd century. Pascal Vipard places the conversion between the second and last quarter of the 2nd century. The modifications erased most of the structures of the original theatre. The arena sector may also have been altered, as a wall testifies to structural changes. These modifications may have been intended to enable the site to host munera. (Note: Ferreira, 2017, p. 69.)

The theatre is attested by “irrefutable evidence” in the largest inscription discovered at the site. (Note: de Caumont, 1854, p. 550.) Titus Sennius Solemnis, priest of Diana, Mars, and Mercury, mentioned on the inscription known as the marble of Thorigny, spent 25,000 sesterces in 238 on four days of spectacles. (Note: Pilet, 1984, p. 71.) Gladiatorial combats are mentioned for Vieux, while other spectacles were held at the amphitheatre of the Three Gauls. In 1855, Antoine Charma remained very cautious regarding the reconstruction of the inscription. (Note: Charma, 1855, p. 24.)

==== History of the site since Late Antiquity ====
The theatre was abandoned at the end of the 3rd century, possibly following a fire. Excavations uncovered charred wood at the location of the seating as well as nails. The fire may have occurred after the building had already been abandoned. (Note: Vipard, 2002, pp. 31–32.)

Based on numismatic discoveries, Pascal Vipard argues for “probable use until the end of the 3rd century” and notes the absence of coins from the 4th century, except for one coin of Valentinian I. (Note: Vipard, 2002, p. 32.)

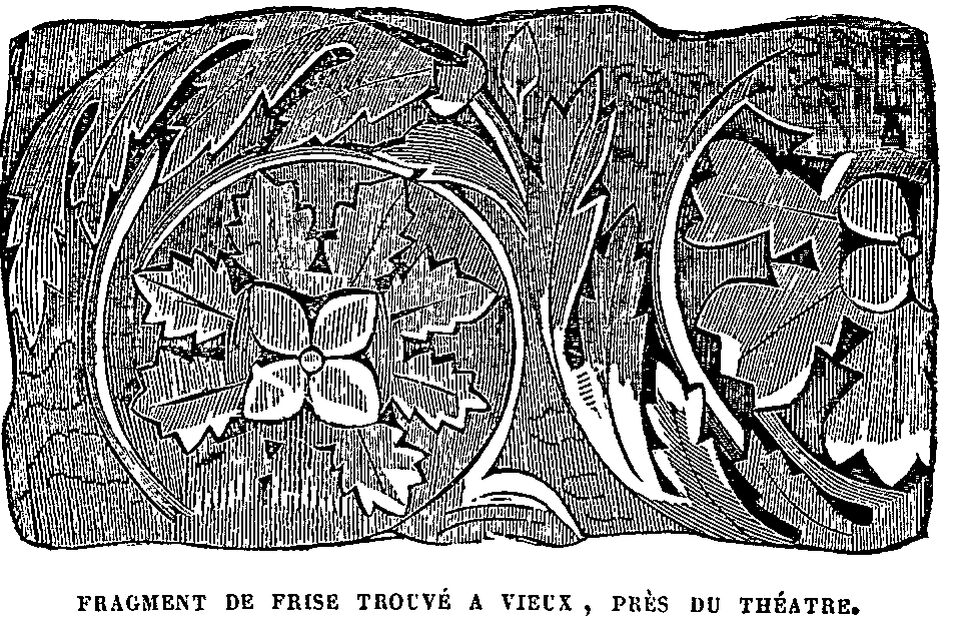
Fragment of the theatre frieze, engraving from the mid-19th century.

The ruins were then used as a source of building material, and a lime kiln was installed. (Note: Jardel, Lelièvre and Rican, 2021, p. 37.) Stone elements associated with the entertainment building, including frieze fragments carved into sarcophagi, were uncovered during excavations of the Frankish-era necropolis at Grand Champ in the 19th century. (Note: Vipard, 2002, p. 34.) This reuse of decorative fragments from the theatre as sarcophagus lids or basins probably dates to the 7th century. (Note: Vipard, 2006, p. 41.) Decorative columns and entablature elements were indeed reused in the necropolis. A Roman milestone of Constantine was also reused as a sarcophagus lid. From this period onward began the “physical disappearance of the Roman city”.

The theatre continued to be used as a quarry during the 7th and 8th centuries. Seven medieval billon coins were found by excavators. Nevertheless, the ruins of the structure remained visible in the landscape for a long time.

=== Rediscovery of the site ===
Modern map of the entire Vieux-la-Romaine site.

==== Discovery of the theatre in the 19th century ====
The archaeological site of Vieux was first excavated in 1702 by Nicolas-Joseph Foucault and Antoine Galland; at that time, the southern baths were explored. Other baths in the city were excavated around the 1730s. Around 1840, Arcisse de Caumont believed that the theatre was located southwest of the city, at the site known as the Champ des Crêtes.

The theatre was excavated in the 19th century, specifically between 1852 and 1854, by Antoine Charma of the Société des antiquaires de Normandie. In addition to the theatre excavations, this learned society carried out three other major excavations at the archaeological site: Arcisse de Caumont excavated the baths of the Champ des Crêtes between 1839 and 1841, and another bath complex on the same plot was excavated between 1859 and 1864.

Local residents had noticed the poor vegetation growth on the site, and the Société des antiquaires de Normandie took advantage of a change in ownership to negotiate—“at a somewhat high price”—the right to conduct archaeological investigations there. (Note: Charma, 1855, pp. 22–23.) The learned society founded by Arcisse de Caumont voted a subsidy of 100 francs for this research, followed by an additional 500 francs. (Note: de Caumont, 1854, p. 548.) According to Antoine Charma, the total amount spent by the society reached 1,700 francs. (Note: Charma, 1855, p. 6.) Members of the local population, described as “needy,” were employed on the excavation works. (Note: Charma, 1855, p. 7.) According to Christian Pilet, the structure was “quite well described and documented for its time”.

After the excavations made it possible to draw a plan of the building, the exposed remains were reburied. The precise location of the structure was gradually forgotten, and its exact location remained problematic for a long time. The difficulty stemmed from the vague description given by the original discoverers, who placed it “at the locality known as Le Jardin Poulain, east of the manor of the knight of La Palue”.

==== Protection of the remains and work since the late 20th century ====
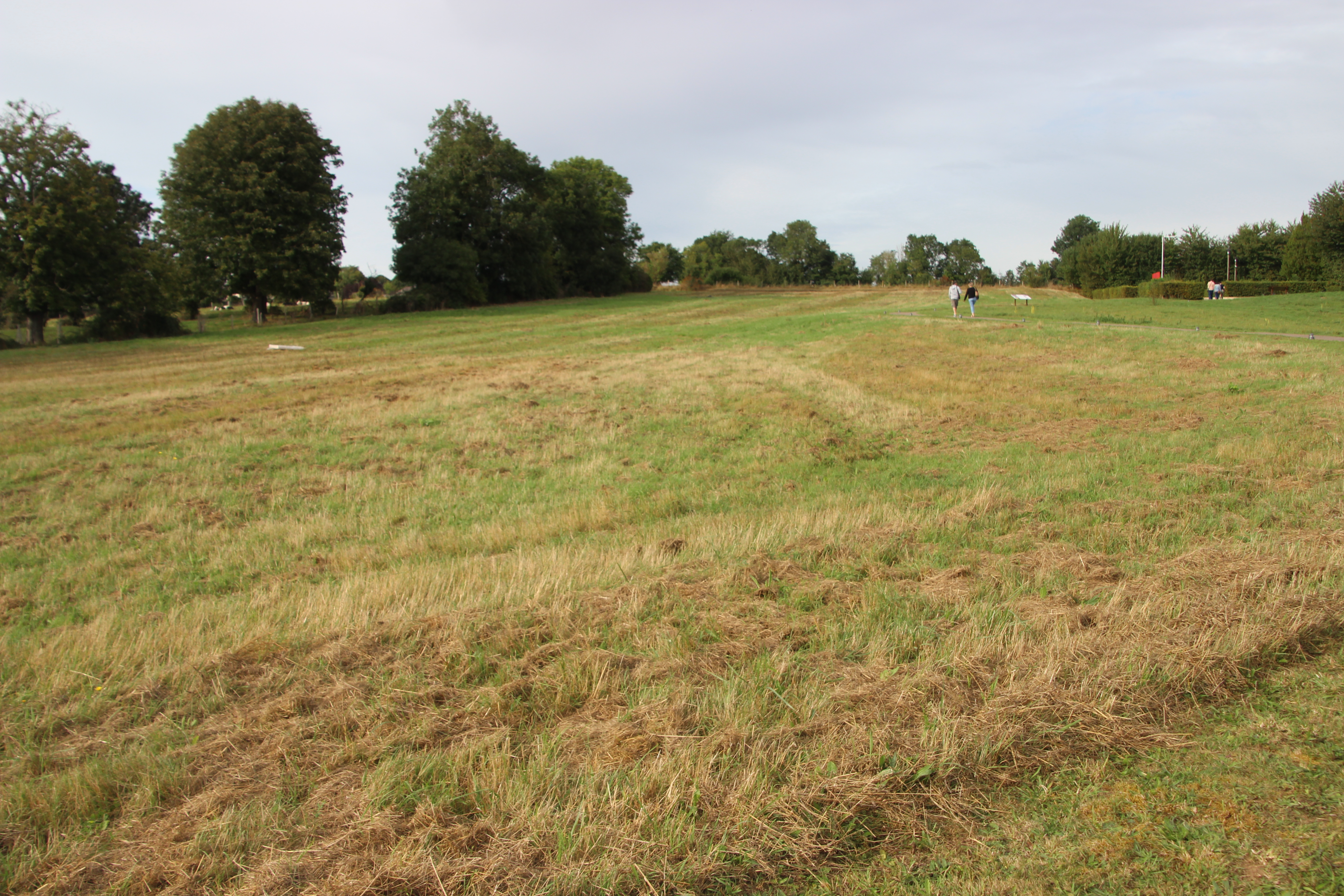
Site of the theatre in 2021: it is located directly opposite the parking area at the upper right.

An aerial photograph was taken by the IGN in 1947. (Note: Pilet, 1984, pp. 71–73.) However, a series of test excavations carried out in Jardin Poulain in 1972 failed to locate the theatre “with certainty”. (Note: Bertin, 1977, p. 139.)

A magnetic survey conducted by archaeologist Christian Pilet in March 1982 provided clues to its location. (Note: Pilet, 1984, p. 68.) This location was refined following excavations in 1995. In the same year, a quarry-pit used as a refuse dump was uncovered in the area by Pascal Vipard. Excavation of this feature yielded, in addition to glassware fragments, nearly 15,000 pottery sherds dating from the late 2nd century and the first half of the 3rd century. (Note: Demarest, Lacroix and Thierry, 2018, pp. 39–40.) The foundations of the structure were rediscovered during excavations in the early 21st century.

The ruins of the Gallo-Roman theatre benefit from two levels of legal protection: the remains located at Jardin Poulain were classified as a Monument historique on 21 April 1980, while those found at L'École were listed on 6 February 1980.

== Description ==
Excavators, including Antoine Charma, identified two construction phases of the structure. (Note: Ferreira, 2017, p. 65.) It contains “the usual elements of a classical theatre”. The building is of “a type common in Gaul, a hybrid monument, either a theatre with an arena or an amphitheatre with a stage”.

=== First structure ===
The first structure remains poorly understood because it was almost entirely destroyed during later alterations.

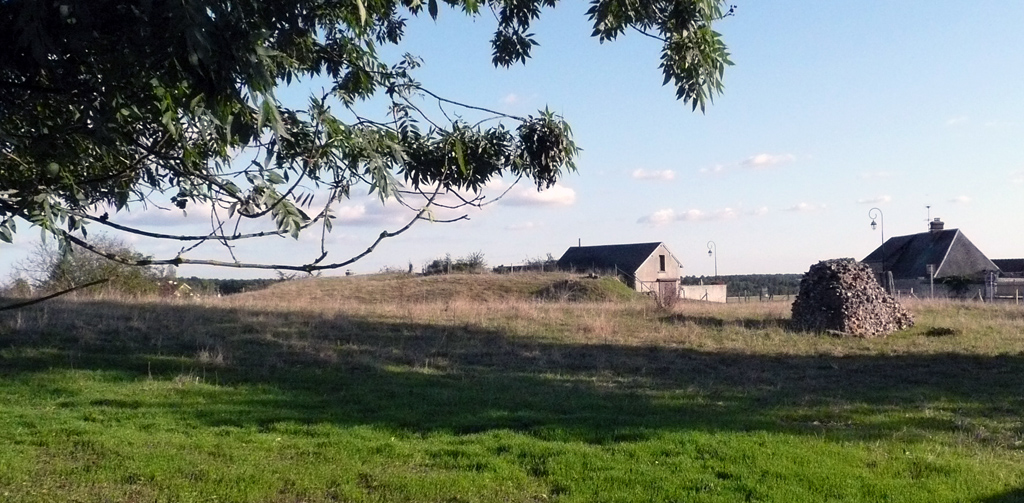
The cavea of the theatre at Gisacum, current state.

Excavations uncovered the façade wall and the postscaenium of the first theatre. The building identified as the stage structure measured 7.40 metres (24.3 ft) in length and 2.80 metres (9.2 ft) in width, and its remains are made of May sandstone. The plan of the building, consisting of an overextended semicircular arc, is similar to the structures at Sanxay and Vieil-Évreux. The seating tiers were made of wood. The cavea of the first structure had a diameter of 67 metres (220 ft). It included a stage with an area of 50 square metres (540 sq ft).

=== Arena theatre ===
The plan of the second theatre is not fully known due to the incomplete nature of the early excavations: the internal circulation routes, service rooms, and the southeastern corner remain unknown. The stage may have been destroyed, and one of the perimeter walls was enlarged outward from the building. (Note: Ferreira, 2017, p. 65.) In its second phase, the structure included seating and an arena covering 610 square metres (6,600 sq ft). The building was constructed with wooden seating, along with limestone and Vieux marble. In 1977, Dominique Bertin suggested the presence of a wooden superstructure. (Note: Bertin, 1977, pp. 135–138.)

The seating tiers were “certainly” made of wood and oriented toward the south. Excavators discovered a large quantity of charred timber. (Note: Charma, 1855, p. 43.) Christian Pilet proposed that the first row of seating, intended for the most prominent members of the city, was made of stone.

The diameter of the cavea was then 80 metres (260 ft), by 67 metres (220 ft). The Viducassan structure, far smaller than the theatre of Lillebonne with its diameter of 148 metres (486 ft), belongs to the category of medium-sized structures, comparable to those at Valognes, Lyons-la-Forêt, or Saint-André-sur-Cailly. (Note: Deniaux, Lorren, Bauduin and Jarry, 2002, pp. 111–112.) The cavea formed an asymmetrical arc. Twenty buttresses have been identified. (Note: de Caumont, 1854, pp. 548–550.) The façade likely measured between 66 metres (217 ft) and 70 metres (230 ft) in length. The wall of the cavea was irregular, with a thickness ranging from 0.65 metres (2.1 ft) to 1.30 metres (4.3 ft). In Gallo-Roman theatres, seating was partly supported by vaults because the structures often took advantage of natural slopes. (Note: Deniaux, Lorren, Bauduin and Jarry, 2002, p. 112.) At Vieux, excavations uncovered six semicircular exedrae in the southeastern corner serving this supporting function, comparable to those at Augst, Fréjus, and Lutetia. (Note: Deniaux, Lorren, Bauduin and Jarry, 2002, pp. 113–114.)

The stage building measured 14 metres (46 ft) in length with a depth of 6 to 7.5 metres (20 to 25 ft), covering an area of 50 square metres (540 sq ft). Michel Matter instead describes a small stage measuring 4 metres (13 ft) by 8.9 metres (29 ft).

The arena was a “false ellipse” measuring 29 or 31 metres (95 or 102 ft) by 25 metres (82 ft), with an area of approximately 610 square metres (6,600 sq ft). This shape gave it an “irregular appearance”. Michel Matter gives the arena dimensions as 35 metres (115 ft) by 30 metres (98 ft).

A circulation gallery between 3 and 3.5 metres (9.8 and 11.5 ft) wide surrounded the theatre. It included two corridors, one 3.10 metres (10.2 ft) wide on the east side and another 3.80 metres (12.5 ft) wide on the west side.

Estimates of the theatre’s capacity have varied since the 19th century. The earliest excavators, including Antoine Charma, estimated capacity at 3,500 seats, or 3,550 seats. (Note: Charma, 1855, pp. 45–46.) Christian Pilet adopted a similar estimate. The theatre has also been described as containing 6,000 seated spectators. In 2021, the capacity was re-estimated at between 5,700 and 7,600 people using a new calculation method.

== Interpretation ==
=== Specific features of the Gallo-Roman theatre ===
The distinctive character of buildings combining elements of both theatre and amphitheatre was already noted in the 18th and 19th centuries. (Note: Matter, 1992, p. 29.) The Gallo-Roman theatre is a “hybrid structure” capable of hosting both theatrical performances and amphitheatrical games. No buildings of this type are found in Gallia Narbonensis. (Note: Golvin, 2013, p. 87.) Theatres of this type were associated with sanctuaries. (Note: Golvin, 2013, p. 95.) Such buildings were constructed between the end of the 1st century and the middle of the 2nd century. (Note: Golvin, 2013, p. 89.)

The form of the Gallo-Roman theatre was defined by François Dumasy in the mid-1970s, although later typological studies refined the understanding of its development. (Note: Ferreira, 2017, p. 57.) The corpus of known structures is heterogeneous; (Note: Ferreira, 2017, p. 58.) around sixty such buildings were known in the territory of Gallia Lugdunensis in the early 1980s, and only about a quarter had been studied, often through outdated research. (Note: Matter, 1992, p. 31.) The concept remains unclear in its “geographical, architectural and functional characteristics”. (Note: Ferreira, 2017, p. 71.)

According to Élisabeth Deniaux, Gaul witnessed “the invention of a new theatrical space”: the structure, which was very costly, served as “a prestige monument, an ostentatious construction.” Considerable materials and labor were required, and these buildings were often built against hillsides. (Note: Deniaux, Lorren, Bauduin and Jarry, 2002, pp. 110–111.) Jean-Claude Golvin emphasizes the “relatively economical architecture” of the Gallo-Roman theatre, while Michel Matter refers to “simplicity in the means employed” and “rusticity in execution.” The extensive use of wood has created preservation challenges for archaeological remains. Theatre buildings, even in small communities, were rarely modest in scale.

These theatres testify to the Romanization of Gaul and adaptation to local conditions. (Note: Deniaux, Lorren, Bauduin and Jarry, 2002, p. 110.) The addition of an arena depended on funding and on “the specific desires of each community concerned”. (Note: Ferreira, 2017, p. 59.) Written sources are extremely scarce, making archaeology the principal source for their study. The theatre was closely linked to religious festivals, (Note: Deniaux, Lorren, Bauduin and Jarry, 2002, p. 111.) giving these buildings a significance beyond that of simple leisure venues. Around sixty theatres are known in the region of Gallia Comata.

=== Entertainment buildings in the region of present-day Normandy ===
The theatre held an essential role in ancient Rome and in the territory of present-day Normandy, (Note: Deniaux, Lorren, Bauduin and Jarry, 2002, p. 109.) and all members of society could attend performances. These spectacles were varied and appreciated by the population as a whole. (Note: Matter, 1992, p. 33.) Cities possessed several entertainment buildings, and theatres in particular were widespread, serving as an “essential place for accommodating crowds”. (Note: Golvin, 2013, pp. 94–95.)

Theatres provided settings for tragedies, comedies, mime, and pantomime, while amphitheatres hosted gladiatorial combats and animal hunts. Chariot racing was also popular, but no Roman circus—the usual venue for such spectacles—has been found in present-day Normandy. Evidence of gladiatorial games survives notably in a statuette from Lillebonne, preserved at the Museum of Antiquities in Rouen, while a bowl discovered at Trouville-en-Caux depicts a chariot race. These objects are products of “long-distance trade”. The performances held in Gallo-Roman theatres were not identical to those staged in larger venues; they may have been “a reduced or adapted version” or altogether different. (Note: Golvin, 2013, pp. 96–97.)

Performances took place in the afternoon, and spectators could also visit shops or craft workshops located in the surrounding district. Spectators sat on the stepped seating of the cavea, with the best seats near the stage reserved for local notables.

Entertainment buildings were also major venues for displays of euergetism, whether through the financing of spectacles or through construction and renovation works; such initiatives were a “source of prestige”. (Note: Ferreira, 2017, p. 70.) These structures also contributed to the Romanization of rural Gaul. The theatre was one of the instruments through which this Romanization spread. Such buildings helped create ties between local elites, the broader population, and political authority. Amphitheatres were generally favored in civic capitals, while secondary settlements appear to have preferred theatres that were later adapted into arena theatres. (Note: Ferreira, 2017, pp. 69–70.) “A multipurpose monument avoided the need to construct a new costly building”. (Note: Golvin, 2013, p. 96.)

=== Specific features of the theatre at Vieux ===
The structure at Vieux is unusual: it is the only known example to possess both a complete arena and a stage. The theatre appears to prioritize amphitheatrical performances over stage productions intended for theatrical performances. Pascal Vipard notes that “nothing rules out the possibility of a removable wooden stage”. The identified stage is very small, with an area of 35 square metres (380 sq ft), and lies 30 metres (98 ft) from the first row of seating and nearly twice that distance from the top of the cavea.

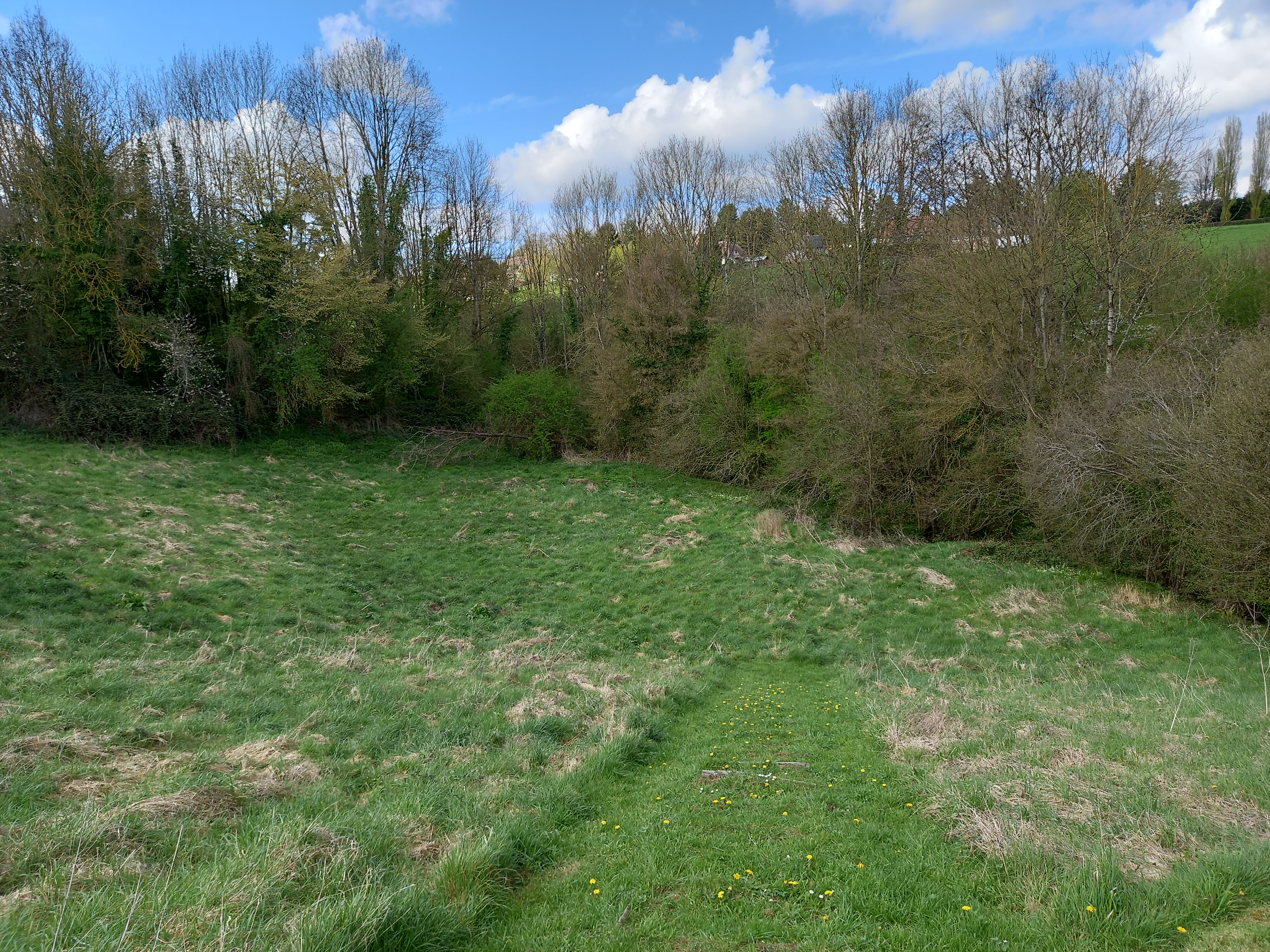
The cavea descending toward the orchestra of the theatre of Lisieux in 2022.

Unlike other similar structures, the theatre of Vieux underwent “a profound reworking of the entire building” rather than a simple adaptation. In its second phase, the theatre of Vieux, like that of Lillebonne, may represent a variant of the Arènes de Lutèce, in which the “required acoustic and visual qualities” mattered less than adherence to conventional architectural forms. (Note: Ferreira, 2017, p. 66.) The irregular shape of the cavea reflects limited resources and construction entrusted to less skilled builders. The plan of the theatre at Vieux closely resembles that of the theatre of Lillebonne, with an “elliptical flat area”. According to Pierre Jeanjean, it also “strikingly recalls” the theatre of Lisieux. (Note: Jeanjean, 1971, p. 26.)

== See also ==
- List of Roman theatres
- House with the Grand Peristyle in Vieux-la-Romaine
- U-shaped courtyard house in Vieux-la-Romaine

== Bibliography ==
=== General works or works on other sites ===
- Delacampagne, Florence (1990). Carte archéologique de la Gaule, 14. Le Calvados. Paris: Éd. de la Maison des sciences de l'homme. ISBN 2-87754-011-1.
- Deniaux, Elisabeth; Lorren, Claude; Bauduin, Pierre; Jarry, Thomas (2002). La Normandie avant les Normands, de la conquête romaine à l'arrivée des Vikings. Rennes: Ouest-France.
- Ferreira, Filipe (2017). "Les édifices de spectacle à arène dans le nord-ouest des Gaules" [Entertainment buildings with arenas in northwestern Gaul]. Aremorica. 8: 57–71.
- Golvin, Jean-Claude (2013). Le théâtre romain et ses spectacles [The Roman theatre and its spectacles]. Lacapelle-Marival: Archéologie nouvelle. ISBN 979-10-91458-06-1.
- Groud-Coudray, Claude (2007). La Normandie gallo-romaine. Cully: OREP éditions. p. 31. ISBN 978-2-915762-18-1.
- Jeanjean, Pierre (1971). "Le théâtre romain de Lisieux". Le Pays d'Auge. February (2): 22–26.
- Matter, Michel (1989). "Théâtres-amphithéâtres et théâtres ruraux" [Theatre-amphitheatres and rural theatres]. Dossiers Histoire et Archéologie (134): 46–49.
- Matter, Michel (1992). "Particularités architecturales des édifices de spectacles en Gaule Lyonnaise" [Architectural characteristics of entertainment buildings in Gallia Lugdunensis]. Spectacula 2: 29–36.
- Sear, Frank (2006). Roman theatres. Oxford: Oxford University Press. ISBN 978-0-19-814469-4.

=== Works on Vieux archaeological site or the theatre ===
- Bertin, Dominique (1977). "La topographie de Vieux - Araegenuae (Calvados), capitale de la cité des Viducasses, d'après les fouilles anciennes et les sondages récents" [The topography of Vieux-Araegenuae (Calvados), capital of the Viducasses]. Annales de Normandie. 27 (2): 131–150.
- de Caumont, Arcisse (1854). "[untitled]". Bulletin monumental: 548–556.
- Charma, Antoine (1855). "Rapport sur les fouilles pratiquées au village de Vieux près Caen (Calvados) pendant les années 1852, 1853 et 1854" [Report on excavations carried out at Vieux near Caen]. Mémoires de la société des antiquaires de Normandie.
- Delaval, Éric (2004). "Vieux / Aregenua (Calvados)". Capitales éphémères. Des capitales de cités perdent leur statut dans l'Antiquité tardive, Actes du colloque de Tours, 6–8 mars 2003. pp. 497–500.
- Delaval, Éric (2006). "Vieux, antique Aregenua : actualité de la recherche". Revue archéologique (1): 215–220.
- Demarest, Mélanie; Lacroix, Aurore; Thierry, Marc-Antoine (2018). "Un dépotoir du IIIe siècle apr. J.-C. dans le quartier du théâtre à Vieux (Calvados)" [A 3rd-century refuse dump in the theatre district of Vieux]. Aremorica. 9: 39–70.
- Hincker, Vincent (2007). "De la ville antique au village médiéval. Déclin de la capitale de la cité des Viducasses, Vieux (Calvados) du IVe siècle à l'an Mil" [From the ancient city to the medieval village: the decline of the capital of the Viducasses, Vieux (Calvados) from the 4th century to the year 1000]. Annales de Normandie (57-1-2): 3–26.
- Jardel, Karine; Lelièvre, Jean-Yves; Rican, Sidonie (2021). Vieux-la-Romaine Aregenua. Bayeux: OREP éditions. ISBN 978-2-8151-0620-7.
- Jardel, Karine; Quévillon, Sophie; Germain-Vallée, Cécile; Jeanne, Laurence; Paez-Rézendé, Laurent; Schütz, Grégory (2015). "Le sous-sol des villes antiques de Basse-Normandie exploré par la géophysique : les exemples de Bayeux (14), Fontaine-les-Bassets (61), Valognes (50) et Vieux (14)" [The subsoil of ancient towns in Basse-Normandie explored by geophysics: the examples of Bayeux, Fontaine-les-Bassets, Valognes and Vieux]. Aremorica. 7: 7–35.
- Pilet, Christian (1984). "Vieux antique (Araegenuae, Viducasses)". Revue archéologique de l'Ouest (1984–1): 63–84.
- Service archéologie du département du Calvados (2015). "Vieux-la-Romaine, nouvelles découvertes et reconstitutions". Archéologia. 535: 62–67.
- Vipard, Pascal (2002). La cité d'Aregenua (Vieux, Calvados) ; chef-lieu des Viducasses. état des connaissances [The city of Aregenua (Vieux, Calvados), capital of the Viducasses: state of knowledge]. Château-Gonthier. ISBN 9782913993051.
- Vipard, Pascal (1998). La maison du « Bas de Vieux » une riche habitation romaine du quartier des thermes d'Aregenua (Vieux, Calvados) [The house of “Bas de Vieux”, a rich Roman residence in the baths district of Aregenua (Vieux, Calvados)]. Caen. p. 125. ISBN 2950649610.
- Vipard, Pascal (2006). "Un exemple d'échec urbain en Gaule Lyonnaise : Aregenua, chef-lieu des Viducasses (Vieux, Calvados)". In Bouet, Pierre; Neveux, François (eds.). Les villes normandes au Moyen Âge, Actes du colloque de Cerisy-la-Salle (9–12 October 2003). Symposia. Caen: Presses universitaires de Caen. pp. 29–44.
