= U-shaped courtyard house in Vieux-la-Romaine =

Gallo-Roman house.

U-shaped Courtyard House
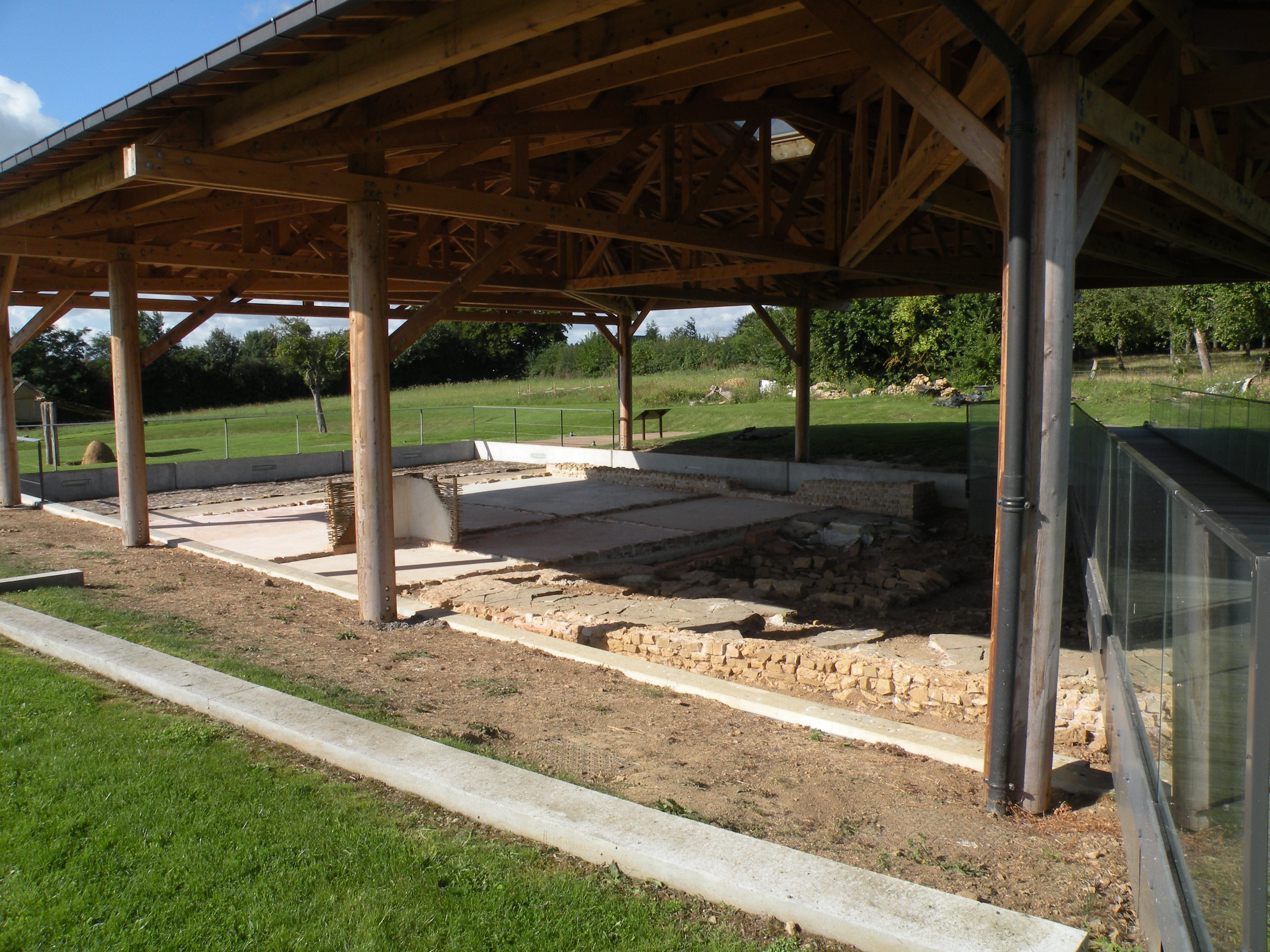
- General view of the domus.
- Interactive map of U-shaped Courtyard House
- Location: Vieux, Calvados, France
- Coordinates: 49°06′25″N 0°25′49″W
- Material: Tile, limestone, sandstone and Caen stone
- Width: 19 m^{2}
- Dedicated to: Ancient Rome
- Website: www.vieuxlaromaine.fr/accueil/1-musee--3-sites/la-maison-a-la-cour-en-u.html

The U-shaped Courtyard House is a Gallo-Roman house located in the archaeological site of Vieux-la-Romaine, the ancient Aregenua, approximately 10 kilometers south of Caen in Normandy. Although it is less opulent than the grand peristyle house of Vieux-la-Romaine, which is regarded as the most impressive private building on the site at the beginning of the 21st century, this discovery is nevertheless noteworthy insofar as it sheds light on the diversity within the society of a small Gallo-Roman town.

In consequence of the aforementioned discovery, a resolution was reached to augment the remains with a view to rekindling interest in the site as a local tourist attraction. The enhancement project for the remains also constituted an occasion for the participation of building and social integration training organisations in the operation.

== Location ==
Simplified map of Aregenua.

The commune of Vieux-la-Romaine is situated approximately 10 km southwest of Caen. It encompasses the site of the ancient town of Aregenua, the urban center of the Gallic Viducasses people, whose territory extended over an area of approximately 2,300 km².

The peripheral district of the town where the house is located was historically the artisans' quarter and is also the place where the ruins of an entertainment building were found. The U-shaped Courtyard House, as it is known to archaeologists, is located close to the Vieux-la-Romaine Archaeological Museum, which was inaugurated in 2002, and to the Gallo-Roman theater of Vieux, (Note: Delaval 2004, p. 498) excavated in the 19th century but whose remains remain buried.

== History ==
=== History of the ancient town ===
Map of cities and capitals in present-day Normandy during the High Roman Empire.

Aregenua, the capital of the Viducasses, one of the peoples of Roman Gaul, was founded in the 1st century. Following a period of prosperity during the 2nd and 3rd centuries under the Severan dynasty, the city was significantly impacted by the plundering at the end of the 3rd century, which has traditionally been attributed to the first barbarian invasions. Its fate, however, was "more or less similar to that of many other towns in Gaul."

Following the devastation, the city was rebuilt in the early 4th century. The territory of Vieux was incorporated into Bayeux during the initial stages (Note: Delaval 2004, p. 497) of the 4th century and was not fortified, in contrast to the sites of Jublains or Corseul. Nevertheless, the site retained its population, and Christianity took root there during the 5th and 6th centuries.

=== Chronology of the House ===
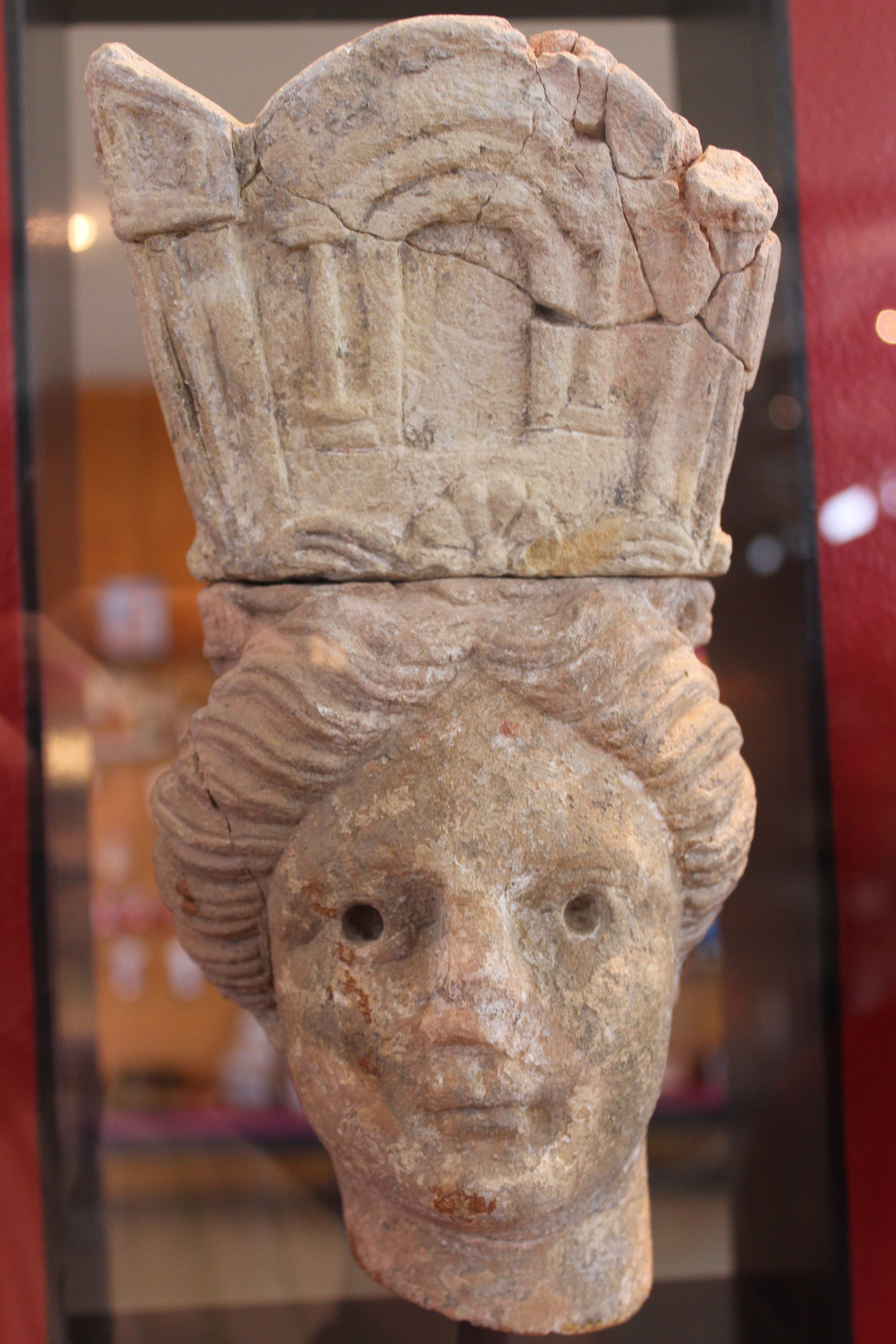
The tutela of Vieux-la-Romaine, a symbol of the city according to archaeologists, found in the excavations of the house with the great peristyle.

The archaeological excavations of the house site revealed the presence of remains dating to the last third of the 1st century. The initial construction of the site may date to the late 1st and early 2nd centuries, although this is contingent upon the interpretation of the remains as solely fill elements. The construction is based on a building that may date from the second half of the 2nd century or the early 3rd century. Therefore, this interpretation would suggest a very late date for the house. The pottery fragments recovered from the backfill of the courtyard construction provide further evidence to support this dating hypothesis. Additionally, the discovery of a tile that was broken in the cellar and bears resemblance to those unearthed during the excavations of the inner portico of the large peristyle villa, dated to approximately 200 CE, lends further support to this conclusion.

Upon the conclusion of the building’s utilization, it is plausible that the structure was employed by an artisan engaged in the manipulation of bone, particularly in the posterior section of the building. The cellar may have been inundated due to the prevalence of moisture-related issues stemming from the deactivation of the drainage system.

The archaeological excavations at the museum site have revealed the remains of a complex of buildings intended for worship, as well as workshops and shops. (Note: Delaval 2004, pp. 498–499)

The conclusion of the house's tenure can be traced to the third quarter of the 3rd century. However, the discovery of subsequent coins may be indicative of a mere recovery of construction materials, rather than a definitive conclusion to the house's occupation. In the same area, buildings were abandoned from the 2nd century onwards. According to Pascal Vipard, this was accompanied by gradual desertion of the district, with life continuing among the abandoned buildings, which were likely in varying states of ruin. However, the district was affected by the resurfacing of the decumanus road at the end of the 3rd century.

During the archaeological excavation, a fragment of a Tuscan-style column was unearthed. This column may have formed part of the decumanus colonnade or a neighboring house.

The site's occupation from the Middle Ages and during the modern era resulted in the degradation of Roman remains exposed to the elements. Additionally, excavations revealed the burial of a child aged 8 to 10 years, as well as that of a horse without its legs. However, the date of these burials could not be determined. The site was covered with arable land.

=== Excavations, enhancement, and dissemination of knowledge ===
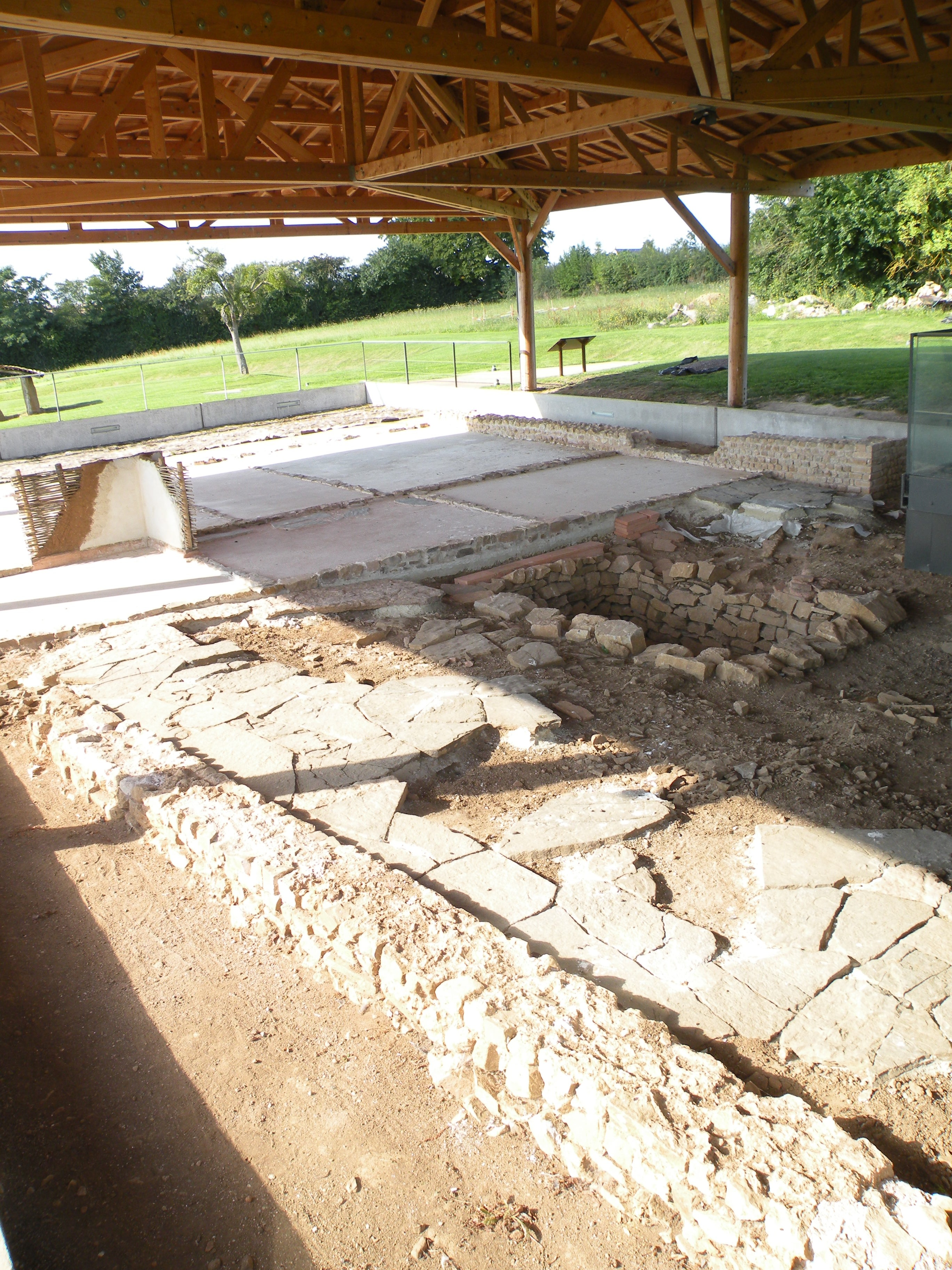
View of the structure protecting the remains.

Modern plan of the entire Vieux-la-Romaine site.

Excavations at Vieux commenced in 1702 and continued into the nineteenth century. The application of modern scientific methods to archaeological investigation began in the 1970s. By the end of the twentieth century, Pascal Vipard had concluded that "a coherent picture of the town's organization remains elusive." Permanent excavations commenced in 1988.

The peripheral district of the town, where the building is located, was subjected to archaeological excavation between 1995 and 2004. The house was excavated in the 1990s by a team comprising archaeologists and individuals participating in social reintegration programs. It is the second domus to be enhanced on the site.

The exposed remains, which have been relatively flattened, have been enhanced for the benefit of visitors and are now protected by a shelter. The enhancement work commenced in 2008 with the construction of the covered structure and a walkway allowing visitors to view the remains optimally. The walkway, measuring 24 meters in length, was installed on January 19, 2011. This enhancement has stimulated renewed interest in the archaeological site and the museum, which opened in the early 2000s.

Restoration work was conducted between September 2011 and 2013 by trainees dispatched by social reintegration organizations and training organizations (including GRETA). The trainees' focus was on the remains themselves. Three hundred trainees in construction participated in the project, which aimed to restore the floors and walls to the last state of the building, dating to the 3rd century.

The virtual reconstruction of the house was completed in 2013 with two primary objectives: to attract a broad audience and to disseminate the latest work on the site. The reconstructions, which were completed after nine months of work, were posted online on the website at the end of 2014.

== Description ==
=== General description of the remains ===
Plan of the U-shaped courtyard house. The red arrows indicate the direction of circulation between rooms.

The house has an approximate total area of 197 m², comprising 112 m² of living space and 85 m² of a service courtyard arranged in a U-shaped configuration around a storage area.

The house's layout is not geometrically perfect; however, the spaces are distributed evenly between two parts. The part of the house dedicated to living space has preserved five rooms, with access to the vestibule that opens onto the street. The existence of an upper floor is a possibility, as the floor is made of tile concrete.

The vestibule has a surface area of 9.50 m², and the threshold is constructed from Vieux marble. The room situated in the front left section of the building measures 26 square meters. The room located in the southeast corner of the house has an area of 20.5 m^{2}. One of the rooms at the rear has an area of 12.9 m², while the other two measure 7.6 m² and 11 m², respectively. The latter is notably smaller than the other two and requires a step to access it. It also has a door leading to the courtyard and schist sandstone slabs on the floor. The courtyard has an area of approximately 75 m² without the central cellar or 86.7 m² if the cellar is included.

A courtyard surrounds an area whose function remains uncertain. However, the walls and floor are meticulously crafted, featuring grayish sandstone and Vieux marble. On the western side, toward the north, a palisade is evident, with post sockets discovered in its vicinity. This palisade was subsequently replaced by a rudimentary wall constructed with repurposed materials.

The dimensions of the cellar are 4.20 × 3.20 meters, which equates to approximately 13.5 m², with a depth of 1.50 meters and a volume of 11.2 m³. The dry-stone walls, which possess technical qualities enabling them to withstand the pressure of the soil, are constructed from Vieux marble or Laize limestone marble, yet their aesthetic appeal is limited. In contrast, the flooring is considered exceptionally quality, crafted from Caen stone and meticulously laid.

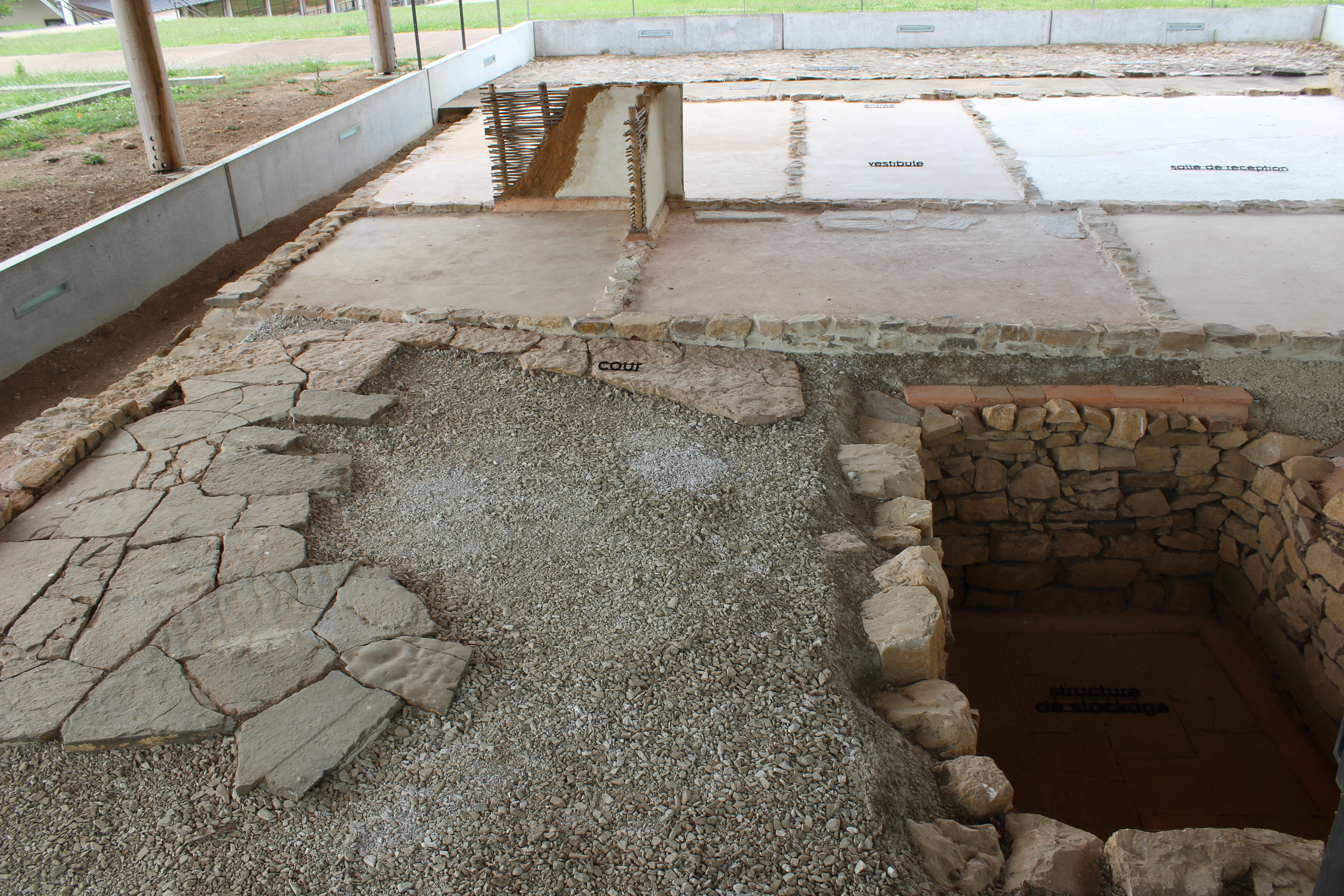
General view of the house from the courtyard.

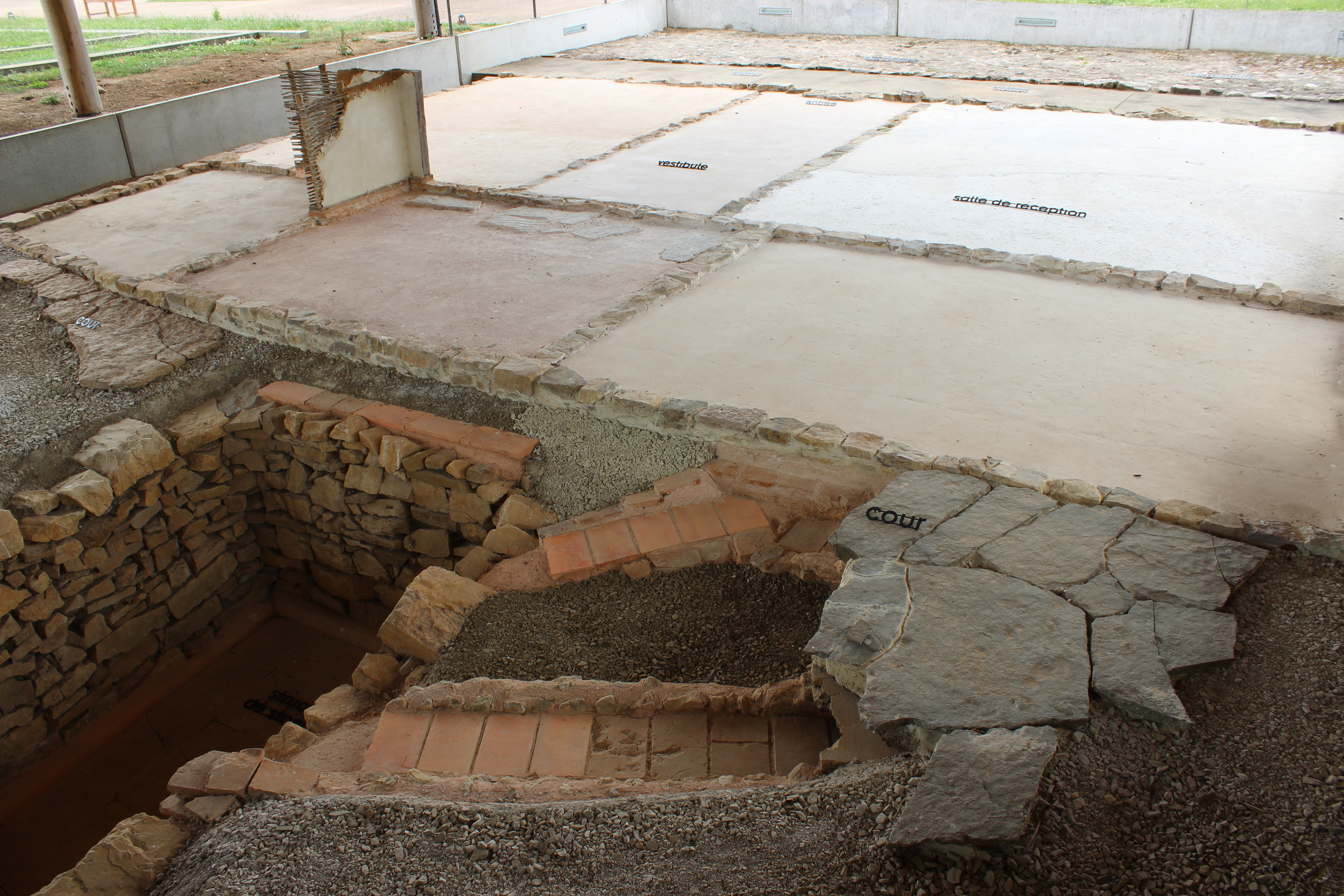
View of the living rooms from the courtyard.

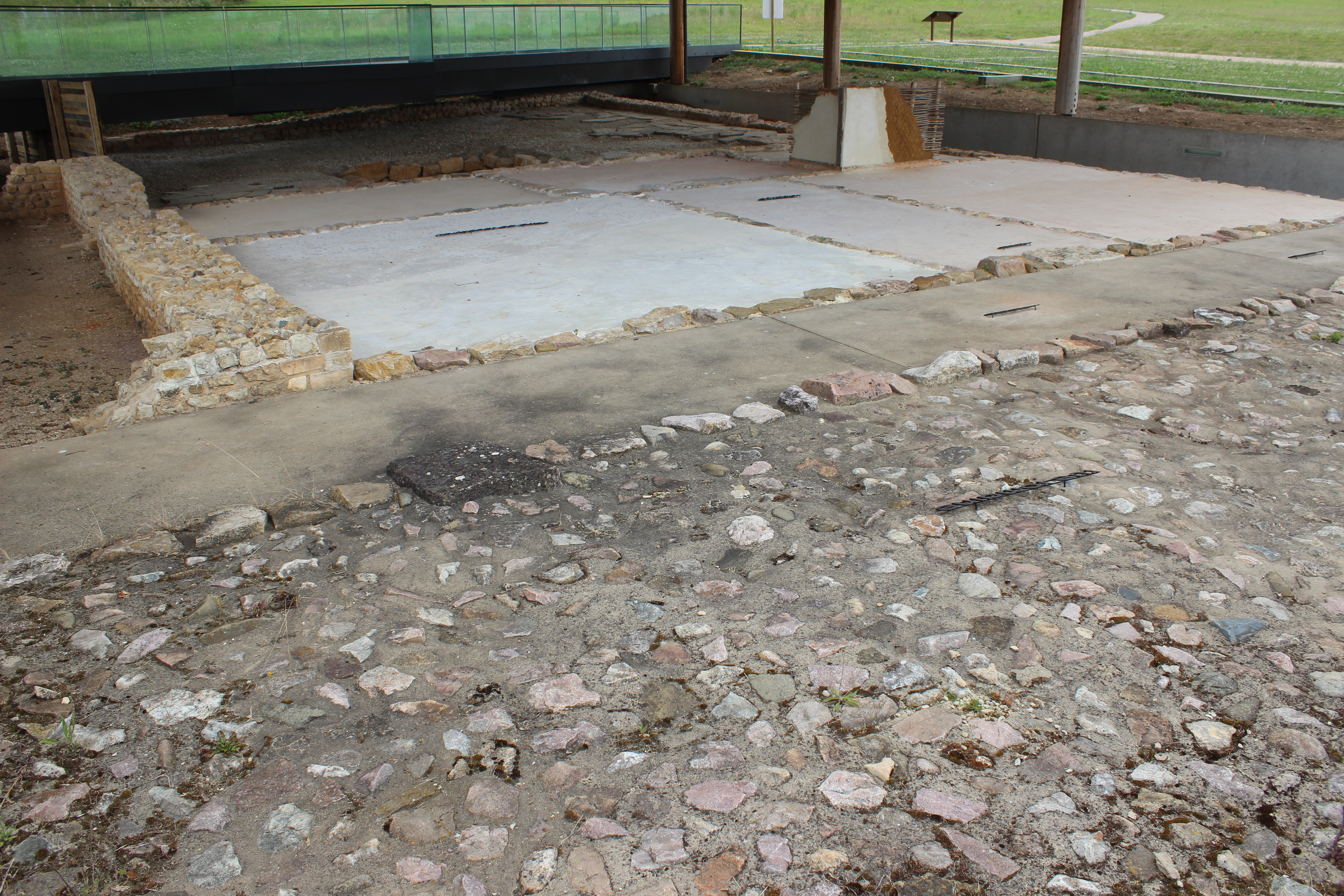
General view from the street.

=== Knowledge of the building and installations ===
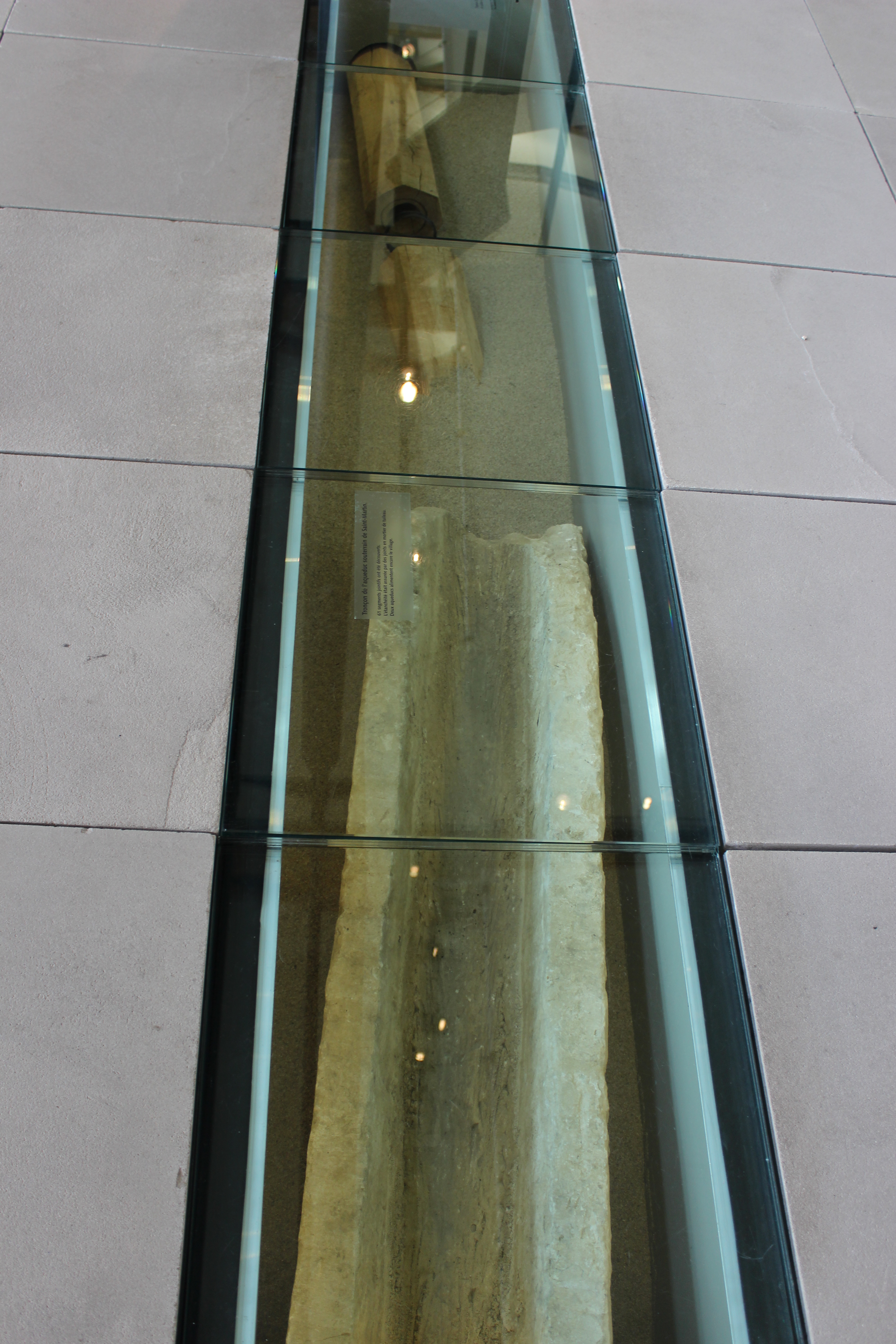
Remains of water pipes preserved in the Musée de Vieux.

The knowledge of the pre-3rd century states is incomplete, and thus they remain under study as of September 2015. The space north of the house may have belonged to the same structure before the property was divided at an unknown time. However, the levels below the uncovered remains could not be excavated, which makes the dating of the house uncertain.

The house was connected to the sewer system via a pipe located beneath the decumanus. Archaeological excavations revealed the presence of pipes made of bricks and tile within the excavated area. However, the starting and ending points of wooden pipes, which could have provided insight into the communication between these installations, remain unknown. The incomplete nature of the excavation has resulted in numerous uncertainties regarding the plumbing network.

Two elements were linked similarly to that observed in another house, namely the villa with the small peristyle. In this instance, oak wood pipes were used for the water supply and brick pipes for the drainage. It may be the case that the brick system was employed to maintain the cellar in a dry state, while the wooden pipe may have been used to supply a fountain installed in the courtyard.

=== Uncertainty about the courtyard storage area ===
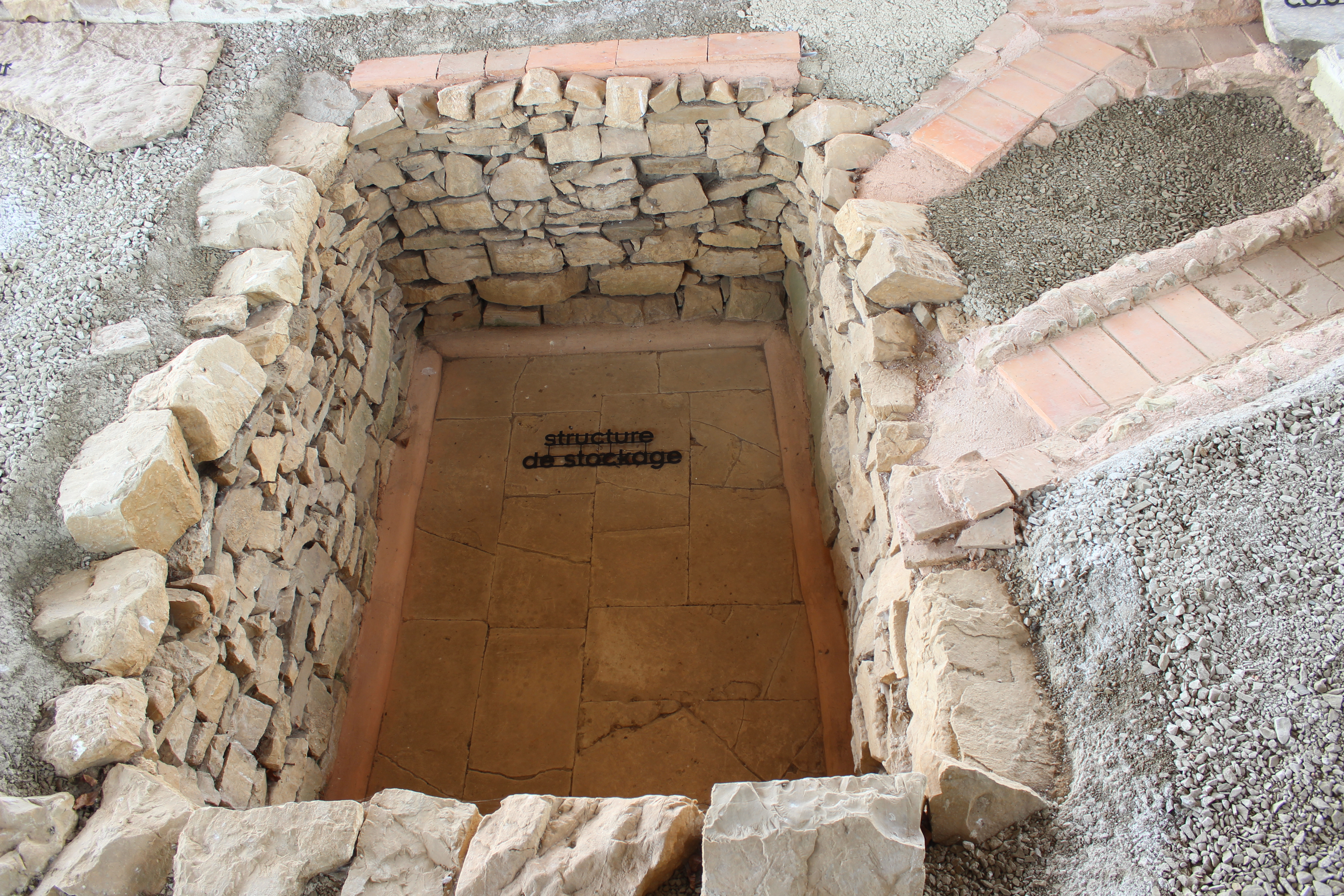
View of the storage area in the courtyard, with brick ducts.

Archaeologists have put forth many hypotheses regarding the reconstruction of the elevation of the storage structure. However, the excavations have not yet determined whether the central element was a cellar or a cistern, nor have they determined whether the courtyard was open-air or covered.

A variety of proposals have been put forth for consideration. The archaeological site's website presents two hypotheses for reconstructing the exterior. One hypothesis posits that the courtyard was covered with a central basin. However, there is no evidence that the floor and walls were waterproof, and preserved elements indicate that the area was designed to drain rather than store water. The alternative hypothesis suggests a courtyard with a cellar covered by a superstructure, including a floor. The walls may have been constructed of wattle and daub, from which the clay remains found during excavations and the tiles may have originated. The absence of a destruction layer, found elsewhere in the excavation, supports this hypothesis.

== Interpretation issues of the house ==
=== Modest habitat reflecting social diversity in a small Gallo-Roman town ===
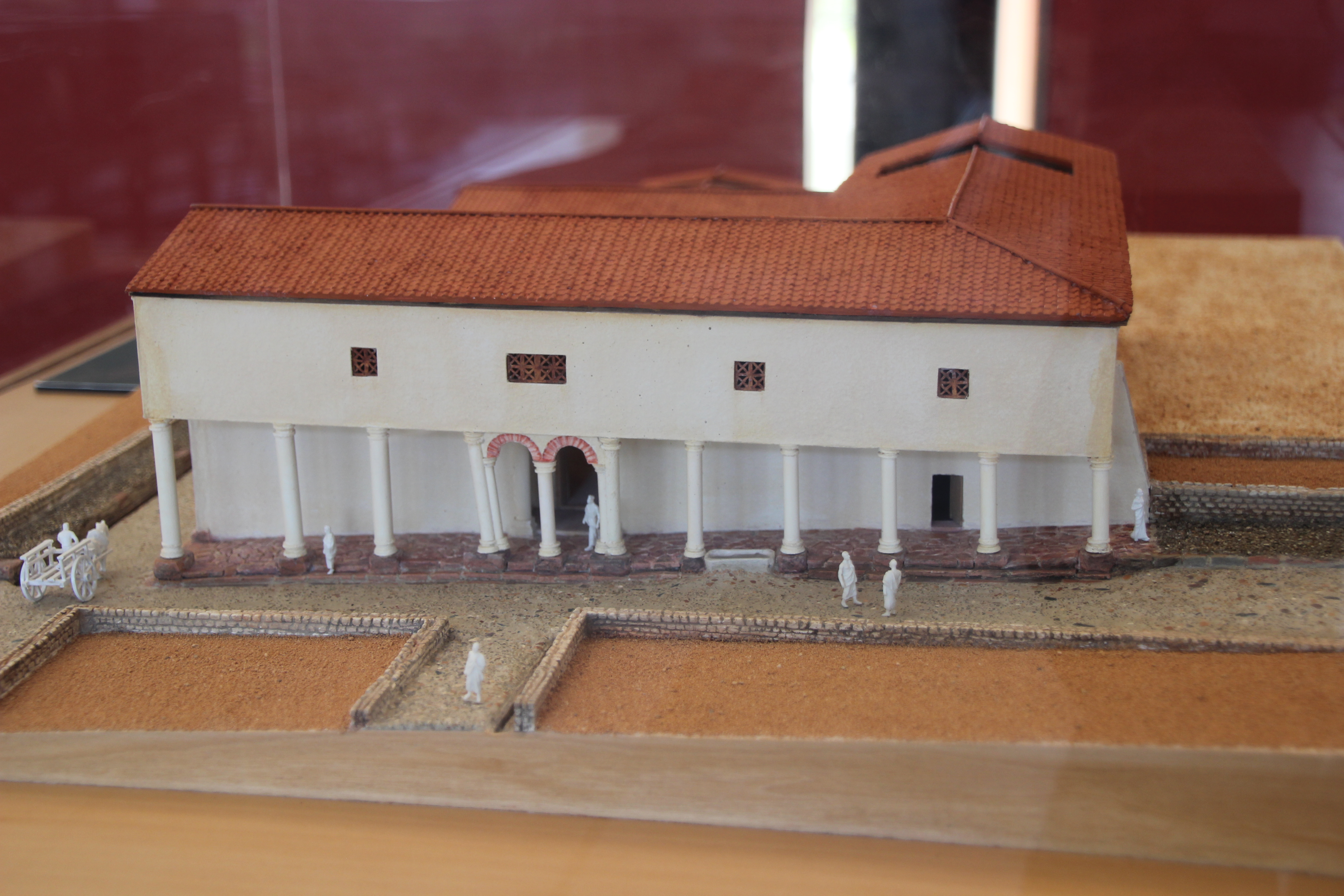
Model of the colonnade and front gallery of the house with the grand peristyle, seen from the north.

Houses serve as a reflection of the social categories and the hierarchy that existed during the Roman Empire.

The Mediterranean-style house type is believed to have spread in Gaul in the mid-1st century. It is thought that most inhabitants' urban houses were located along streets and had shops on the façade facing these thoroughfares. It is further postulated that the living spaces were located at the rear or in rooms upstairs.

The plots were of a greater depth than width, and the street width was a multiple of the pace, thus allowing the spaces facing the street to be utilized by merchants and artisans.

The habitation is more modest than the House with the Grand Peristyle, which allows for an understanding of the different districts of the town and the social classes that inhabited the city of the Viducasses.

The Romanization process impacted significantly the architectural style of even modest houses. This is evident in the construction techniques employed and the comfort elements incorporated, as illustrated by the excavations of the house with the U-shaped courtyard. The clients' actions demonstrate a clear imitation of the elite lifestyle.

=== Example of the versatility of functions of Roman houses? ===
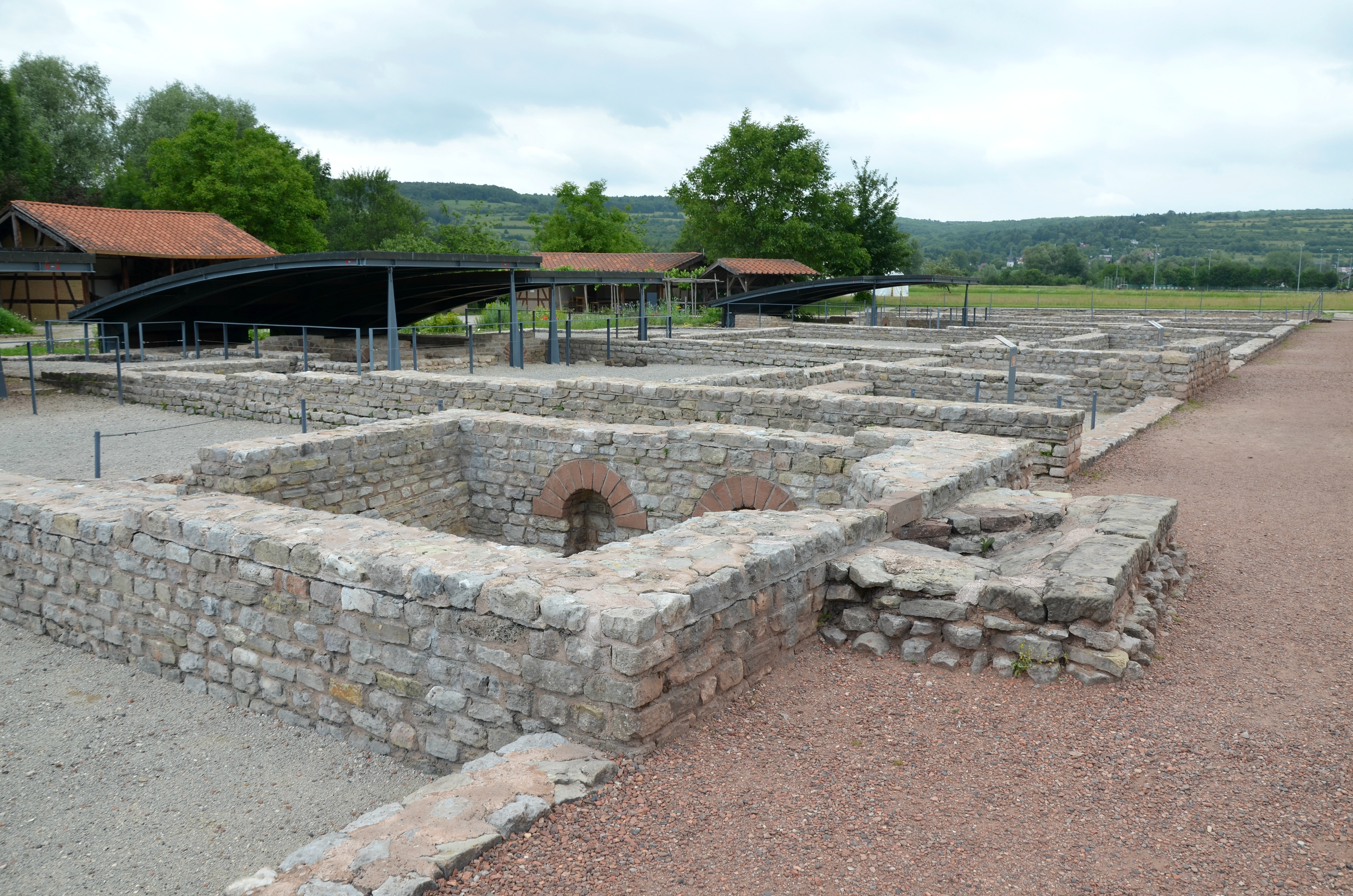
View of the western quarter of the vicus of the Bliesbruck-Reinheim European Archaeological Park, occupied until the third quarter of the 3rd century.

In urban contexts, houses were multifunctional, encompassing residential and productive spaces but also dedicated areas for ritual and spiritual activities. The rear of the Roman house, in particular, was often dedicated to the accommodation of living quarters and production facilities.

The residences of the prominent figures served a public function, particularly in the reception areas and gardens, as exemplified by the House with the grand peristyle. Artisans and merchants held significant economic and social influence. These houses, including those of the artisan merchants, provided accommodation for the owner’s extended family, comprising slaves and free persons at his service. The rooms were adaptable, with the sparse furniture capable of being rearranged to suit multiple functions throughout the day.

The U-shaped courtyard of the house did not yield any archaeological evidence of artisanal or commercial activities. The rooms at the front of the house are identified on the site as living spaces. This particular structure does not exemplify the versatility of Roman houses. The rear of the house revealed the remnants of activities related to bone craftsmanship.

The Vieux site has yielded several examples of these cellars, located inside houses or annexes. Other examples have been found in sites in northern France, such as Villedieu-sur-Indre, Reims, Besançon, and Paris. These served as storage for perishable goods. In Paris, ceramics intended for storage were discovered in one of these installations. In Vieux, the house's cellar with the U-shaped courtyard likely had the "classic storage function."

== See also ==
- House with the Grand Peristyle in Vieux-la-Romaine
- European Archaeological Park of Bliesbruck-Reinheim

== Bibliography ==
=== General books and articles ===
- Kasprzyk, Michel; Monteil, Martial (2017). "Agglomérations, vici et castra du Nord de la Gaule (IIIe-VIe s. apr. J.-C.) : esquisse d'un bilan". Gallia (in French). 74–1: 1–12. doi:10.4000/gallia.2328. Archived from the original on June 24, 2024.
- Petit, Jean-Paul; Santoro-Bianchi, Sara (2007). De Pompéi à Bliesbruck-Reiheim : Vivre en Europe romaine (in French). Errance.

=== Books and articles about the Vieux site ===
- Delaval, Éric (2004). "Vieux / Aregenua (Calvados)". Capitales éphémères. Des Capitales de cités perdent leur statut dans l'Antiquité tardive, Actes du colloque Tours 6-8 mars 2003 (in French). Archived from the original on April 24, 2024.
- Service archéologie du département du Calvados (2015). "Vieux-la-Romaine, nouvelles découvertes et reconstitutions". Archéologia (in French): 62–67.
- Vipard, Pascal (1998). La maison du « Bas de Vieux » une riche habitation romaine du quartier des thermes d'Aregenua (Vieux, Calvados) (in French). Caen. ISBN 2950649610.
- Vipard, Pascal (2002). La cité d'Aregenua (Vieux, Calvados); chef-lieu des Viducasses. état des connaissances (in French). Château-Gonthier. ISBN 9782913993051.
