= Alauna, France =

Ancient Gallo-Roman town in Valognes

Alauna
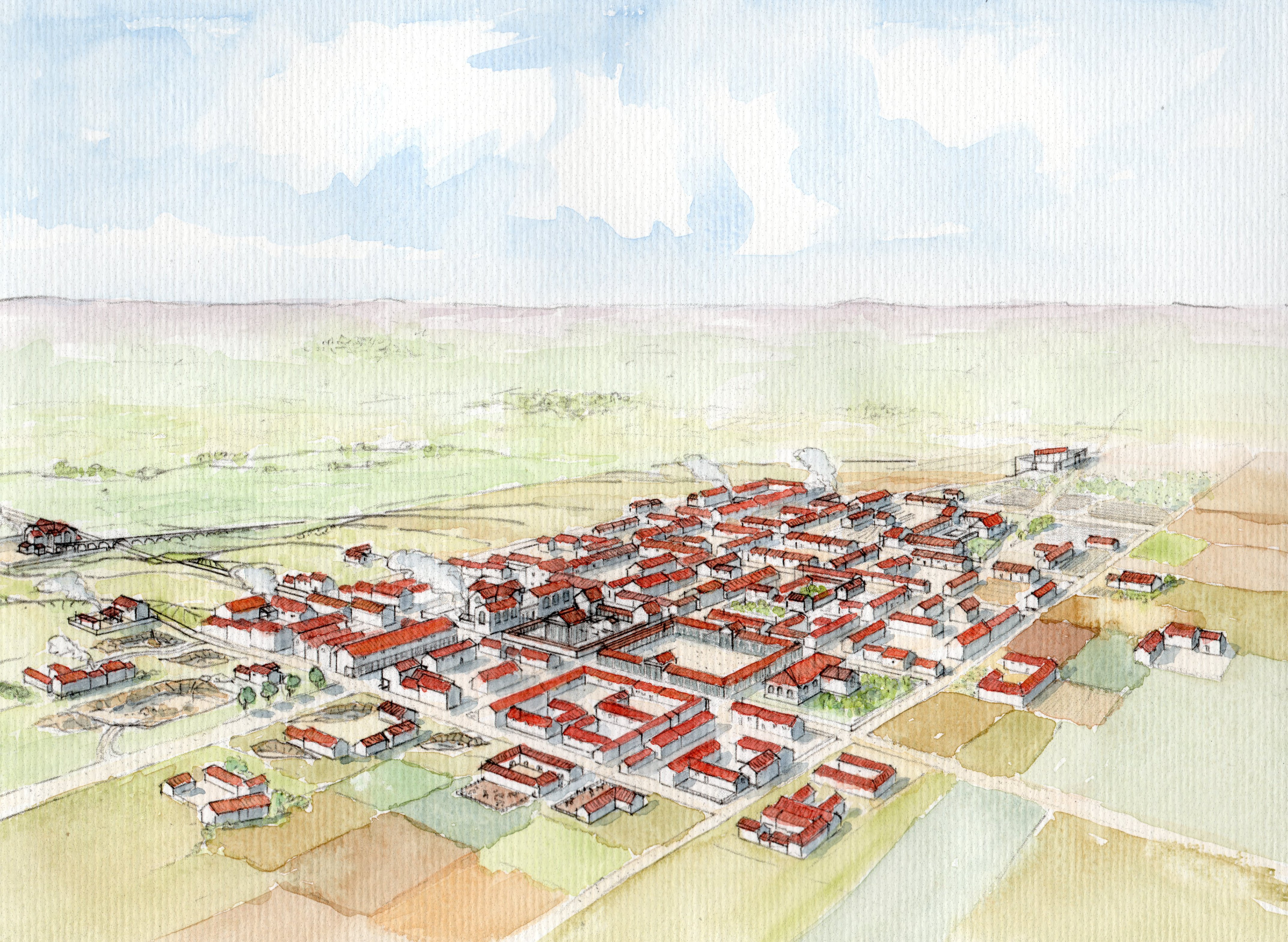
- Watercolor painting of the 2nd century proposed reconstruction of Alauna by Dominique Lepoittevin
- Interactive map of Alauna
- 49°30′17″N 1°27′15″W
- Location: Valognes, France
- Region: Normandy

Site notes
- Area: 60 ha (150 acres)

Alauna is a Gallo-Roman town, whose remains are located in the former commune of Alleaume in Valognes, France.

Alauna, situated in the northern region of the Cotentin Peninsula, appears to have been established during the reign of Augustus. It underwent significant development during the first century and was extensively occupied during the Gaulish era. It was connected to many towns in the area and is on the Tabula Peutingeriana and Antonine Itinerary. It was the capital of a civitas at some point during the Roman Empire, which declined significantly during the 3rd century. In the Middle Ages, when urbanization resumed in Valognes especially near the Merderet, Alauna became the land for agricultural activities, primarily for livestock farming, a vocation that continues into the 21st century in a Norman bocage landscape.

The Ancient Baths of Alauna, which are situated to the north of the city, were added to the list of French protected historical monuments in 1862, and were named a Monument historique. The outskirts of Alauna became a craft center including butchers, forges, and shopping areas.

== History and geographical setting ==
=== Plateau site in the northwest of the Paris Basin ===
Alauna relief map

Alauna is situated 1.6 km southeast of Alleaume on the northwest edge of a plateau between two parallel thalwegs oriented northwest-southeast, which limit it to the east and west. This plateau dominates the depression to the southeast in which the Merderet flows, near the river's sources. While a significant portion of the ancient city's southeastern region is situated on the plateau at an elevation exceeding 50 meters (60 meters near the spectacle building), the remainder follows the valley's slope, with inclines occasionally reaching 10 percent. The baths, situated to the northwest, occupy the lowest point at an altitude of 38 meters. The towns of Valognes and Alleaume are located on the opposite side of the Merderet.

A layer of varying thickness of loam, red clays, sands, and pebbles from the Rhaetian period covers the top of the plateau. On the plateau's slopes, formations deposited in the Hettangian period during a marine transgression are present, including the Calcaire de Valognes, which is the predominant rock type in Alauna that occupies the northwestern edge of the Paris Basin Local geological resources have been exploited since the beginning of antiquity, with quarries located west of the town for the construction of Alauna's buildings and roads.

=== Dense communication network ===
Ancient roads leading to Alauna (Peutinger Table, Antonin's journey, Other route)

The Peutinger Table indicates that the ancient station of Alauna, which is not represented by a vignette like important towns, was situated on the Roman road connecting it to Coriallo (Cherbourg). The road continues southeast towards Crociatonum, which may be Saint-Côme-du-Mont or Carentan, the Baie des Veys, Augustodurum, and Aregenua (Vieux) before heading towards Rotomagus (Rouen) along the coast.

Another road on the Antonine Itinerary, commences from Alauna and proceeds to the south towards Cosedia/Constancia (Coutances), Legedia (Avranches), and Condate Riedonum (Rennes).

==== Archaeological evidence ====
Alauna was linked to the Cotentin coastline. To the southwest, a route extends to the Côte des Isles and Portbail, which appears to correspond to the ancient town of Grannonum. It extends to the northeast through the road traverses the Val de Saire before reaching the coast at Barfleur or Saint-Vaast-la-Hougue. To the north, Alauna is connected to Cherbourg and Fermanville.

In addition to the main routes that have been confirmed by archaeological evidence, Alauna was also situated at the heart of a network of ancient roads and paths that irrigated the peninsula up to the Cap de la Hague. However, the incomplete state of research across the Cotentin likely understates the importance of this network.

==== Urban interconnections to clarify ====
Alauna appears at the center of a "road star" connected by roads or paths to numerous other sites in the Cotentin and beyond. Some of these routes are documented by ancient written sources, while others are gradually revealed by archaeology. These communication routes can be easily connected to the urban network of cardines and decumani, as identified and sometimes formally identified. This would explain certain deviations in the alignment of these urban roads in the town's periphery. Researches made it likely that irregularities were results of topographical constraints.

The southern decumanus identified in the ancient city appears to have played a significant role in facilitating long-distance connections, with its extensions seemingly oriented towards Portbail to the west and the Baie des Veys to the east. In contrast, the cardo maximus seems connected to the northern coast of the Cotentin at two distinct points, namely Coriallo/Cherbourg and Fermanville. To the south, it is probable that the road leading towards Coutances represents the southernmost extent of the decumanus maximus. However, the precise nature of this connection requires further investigation. Additionally, a road running parallel to the theatre to the east extends towards the Val de Saire.

=== Political status ===
Late Roman cities in Normandy

Alauna is traditionally located in the northern part of the civitas of the Unelli. No ancient text specifies the chief town of the civitas. While some historians and archaeologists proposed that Alauna could be the chief town of the Unelli civitas since the 17th century, others have suggested that this role may belong to Crociatonum (Saint-Côme-du-Mont or Carentan) or Cosedia/Constancia (Coutances). However, researches on Alauna indicates that by its size and monumental structures, Alauna could claim the status. The population of the town is estimated to have reached 3,000 to 4,000 inhabitants.

A hypothesis emerges from recent studies that consider a significant political evolution over the centuries. During the Early Roman Empire, two territories with their head coexisted in the Cotentin: Alauna in the north, and Cosedia in the south. The Manche department was then divided into two territories by an east-west line. The administrative reorganization of the Roman provinces, initiated by Diocletian in the Later Roman Empire, resulted in the merger of the two territories, with Alauna losing its status in favor of Constancia, the sole chief town of a unified and extended Unelli territory that took the name Constantinus Pagus. (Note: In a comparable scenario, the dissolution of Vieux-la-Romaine (Aregenua) as the capital of the Viducasses, a civitas incorporated into that of the Bajocasses, is regarded as a pivotal factor in the city's decline.)

== Toponym ==
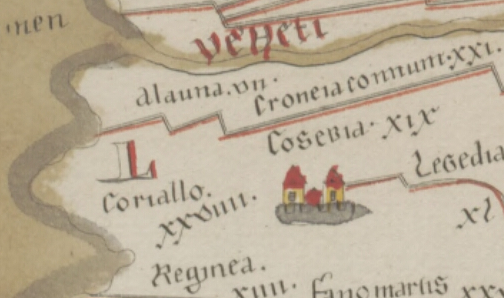
Alauna on the Peutinger Table

The earliest references to the site are found in two ancient documents: the Peutinger Table, which dates from the 1st century and was likely completed by the 5th century, and the Antonine Itinerary, which was created in the late 3rd century. After a hiatus of several centuries, the names "Aleaume" in 1251 and "Alleaume" in 1258 appear, coexisting until the mid-18th century. From that point onward, only "Alleaume" is mentioned. The phonetic connection between Alauna and Alleaume is challenging to ascertain; therefore, it may be more plausible to consider a written modification resulting from a transcription error. The evolution from Alauna to the toponym Valognes, which is frequently mentioned, is even more difficult to conceptualize.

The name Alauna, of Celtic origin, is the root of numerous place names in France (Alleaume, Allonne(s)...) and England (Aln, Alnwick, Alnmouth). Among the various hypotheses regarding the etymology of this toponym, three appear to be particularly favored, although none is definitively established: it could refer to a river, a height (either literally or symbolically), or a god.

During the Late Roman Empire, the civitas of the Unelli had Constancia (Coutances) as its chief town and became known as Constantinus Pagus, from which the name Cotentin was derived.

=== From ancient peak to medieval decline ===
==== Latène occupation ====
The site exhibits evidence of diffuse occupation during the first half of the 1st century BCE (La Tène D). The area later occupied by the ancient city displays evidence of enclosures and parcels throughout. A large enclosure, open to the east by a monumental porch, is linked to an agricultural operation with a metallurgy workshop, located immediately west of the perimeter of the ancient city. This structure was active until the 1st century, when the city was built. It was later abandoned, but its layout influenced the ancient road passing through it and the urban grid of Alauna.

==== Foundation under Augustus and peak until the 3rd century ====
The initial construction of the ancient city, which does not appear to be directly derived from the Latène occupation, is dated to the Augustan period. It primarily affected the northern and central parts of the site, a smaller area than the previous occupation. The principium (first forum) and the central sanctuary in its initial state are attributed to this period.

This was followed by a phase of territorial expansion and monumentalization in the second half of the 1st or early 2nd century, with the construction of large complexes such as baths, an entertainment building, and likely a new forum and remodeled sanctuary. The city reached its peak until the late 2nd or early 3rd century, during which the majority of the artifacts found date from this period and are spread over the largest area. It is likely that the road network was initially sketched out from Alauna's foundation, but was subsequently completed and adjusted according to the needs of the expansion phase, which involved the reclamation of the space that had been occupied during the Iron Age.

==== Decline under the Late Empire ====
Alauna experienced a gradual process of abandonment from the mid-3rd century onwards, a scenario that was observed in the majority of cities in northern Gaul at the same time. While the underlying causes remain uncertain and may vary from one site to another, the main monuments of the city were progressively abandoned, and the artifacts found (ceramics, coins) became increasingly scarce. This suggests a shift in activity toward the center at the expense of the periphery. There is no evidence to suggest that the city was suddenly abandoned due to a fire caused by barbarian invasions, as is often assumed. A more plausible hypothesis is that the city declined gradually, potentially due to the loss of its status as a civitas capital. The growing economic influence of Coriallo (Cherbourg), with its maritime connection to Roman Britain, may have contributed to Alauna's loss of influence.

The history of Alauna during the Late Roman Empire and the early Middle Ages is archaeologically less documented than that of other sites in the region. However, it is possible that a type of occupation, whether permanent or temporary, involving material recovery activities in the ruins of the ancient city may have occurred.

==== Valognes ====
New constructions are well attested in the 12th and 15th centuries in the Victory district to the south and near the baths to the north. These habitat remains, which were revealed by surveys, are reburied after study. In the modern era, the ancient site of Alauna was gradually converted to agricultural use especially for farm construction and parcel delineation. Valognes developed from the Middle Ages on the other side of the Merderet river, but a direct connection between Alauna and Valognes is difficult to establish based on researches. This urbanization did not threaten Alauna's remains until the early 21st century.

=== Rediscovery and detailed study of the site ===
==== 17th and 18th centuries: Initial research ====
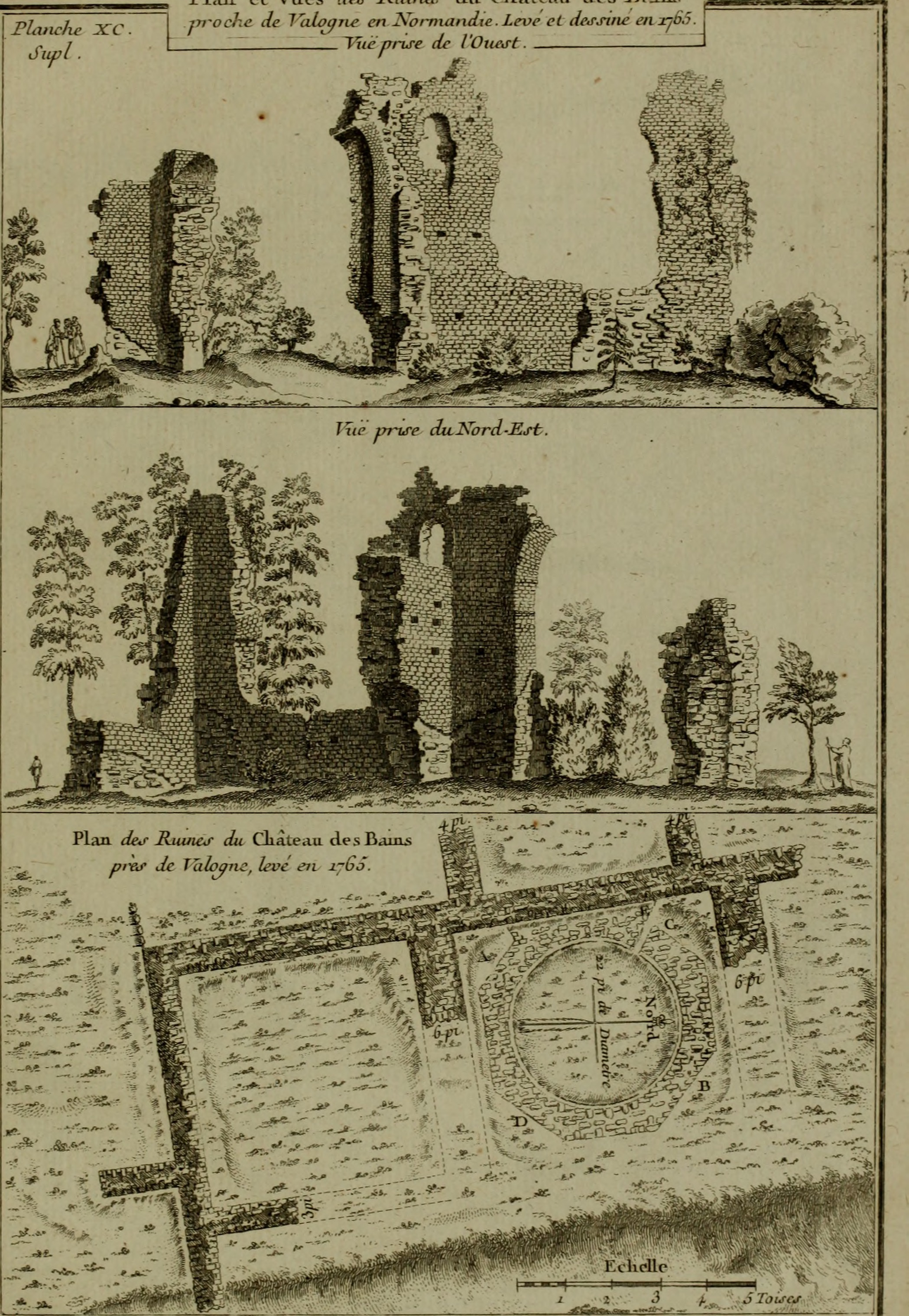
Thermal baths (drawings and plan by René Cevet).

Although the station of Alauna is referenced in the Peutingeriana Table (1st-5th centuries) and the Antonine Itinerary (3rd century), its history was largely forgotten over time. Nicolas Sanson identified the site as Alleaume in 1627, based on the known monuments (baths, theater, and "Wall of Victory") and its geographical location.

The initial excavations were commissioned by Nicolas-Joseph Foucault, intendant of the Généralité of Caen, and conducted by Jesuit Pierre-Joseph Dunod, who unearthed the theater in September and October 1695. A plan was published in 1722 by Bernard de Montfaucon. Dunod also identified the baths, which had previously been attributed to a "castle" built by Clovis. In 1765, Anne Claude de Caylus published drawings and a partial plan of this establishment by engineer René Cevet in the seventh volume of his Recueil d'antiquités égyptiennes, étrusques, grecques, romaines et gauloises. In 1695, the "Wall of Victory" was interpreted as a citadel remnant, and a large complex with a hypocaust room was excavated. However, Pierre-Joseph Dunod's vague notes prevent its precise localization and determination of whether it was a domus with private baths or a second public bath establishment.

==== 19th and 20th centuries: Sporadic investigations ====
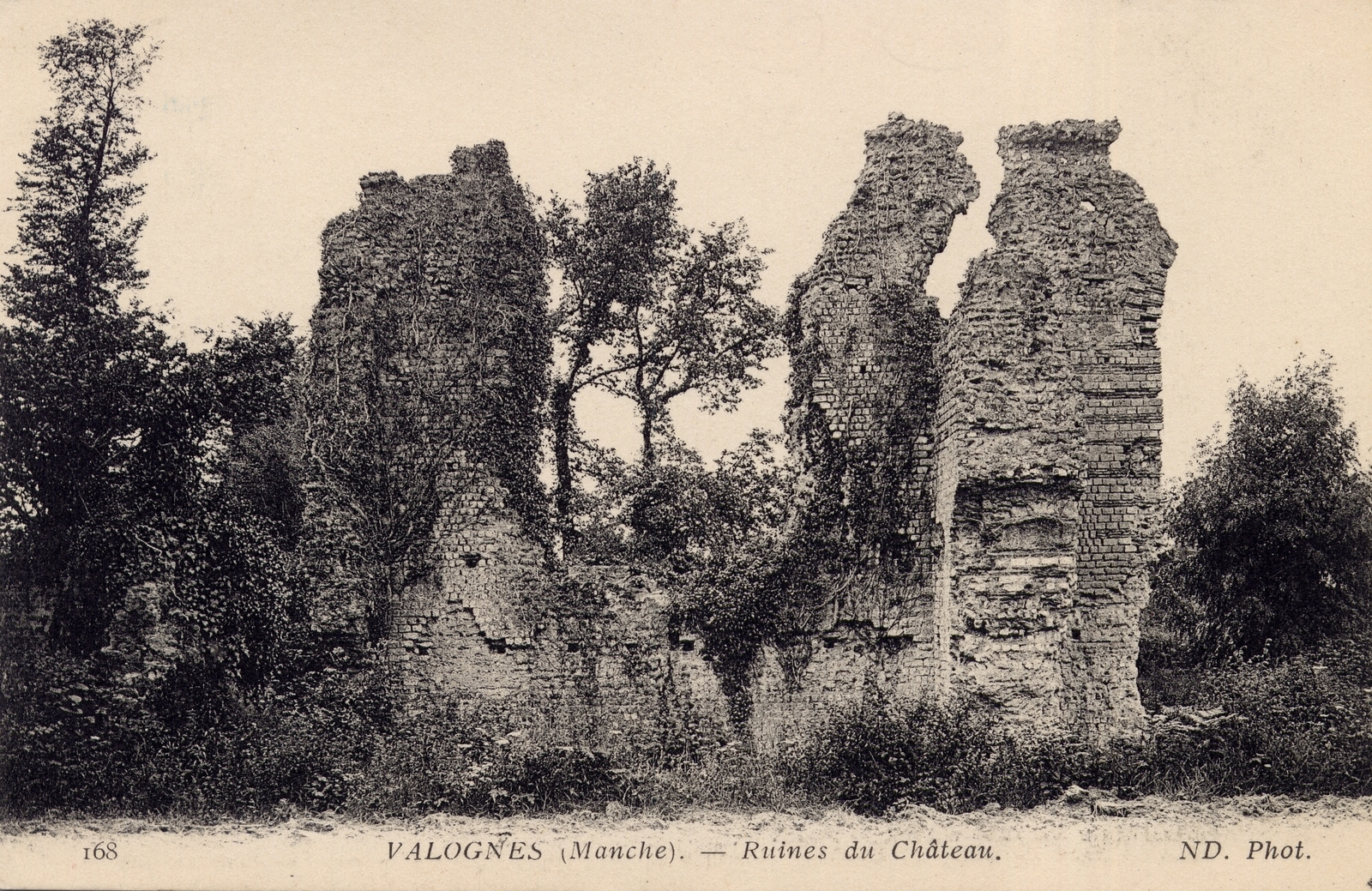
The "Château" (circa 1900).

In the 19th century, while the ruins of the baths were rarely recognized as such and the existence of the theater had largely disappeared from the memory of the inhabitants, Charles de Gerville resumed research at Alauna. His primary focus was on artifact collection, meticulous location on a cadastral map, and monitoring of roadworks. He also reported on the destruction of artifacts at the theater and baths sites. In 1845, the Society of Antiquaries of Normandy continued Gerville's work, classifying the baths as historical monuments in the 1862 list. They were the first ancient building in the department to be protected as a historical monument.

In 1905, Jean-Louis Adam endorsed the tradition, reported as early as 1695 but unverified, of the destruction of Alauna by fire at the end of the 4th century. He supported his argument with the dating of coin finds. The intense bombings that largely destroyed Valognes in June 1944 during the Battle of Normandy did not affect the ancient site. The baths were not damaged, and no other remains were revealed by the bombing destructions. In the 1990s, three excavation campaigns of the baths, preceding the enhancement of the site, resulted in an exhaustive study of the complex, definitively establishing its plan and better understanding its chronology.

==== 21st century: Interdisciplinary program on the entire site ====
Until the early 21st century, the historical knowledge of Alauna was based primarily on the interpretation of 18th and 19th-century publications.

From 2012 to 2022, a multi-year program coordinated by Laurence Jeanne (Centre de recherches archéologiques et historiques anciennes et médiévales, CNRS/University of Caen-Normandy - AAA association) and Laurent Paez-Rezende (National Institute for Preventive Archaeological Research - AAA association) conducted research, the results of which were published annually. The program's scope was comprehensive, encompassing the entire site. The program encompassed a comprehensive examination of all available documentation, an exhaustive inventory of archaeological artifacts, the identification and interpretation of these artifacts, the implementation of surveys and programmed excavations up until 2016, and the utilization of generalized georadar prospection from 2017 to 2022. This non-destructive technology was selected for its ability to facilitate the study of expansive areas that are inaccessible to excavations. While it does not provide precise architectural insights into buildings, it offers valuable insights into their ground plan and, to some extent, their relative chronology without absolute dating. However, ditch structures or material recovery trenches are not detected, and the preservation state of remains remains unknown. The program's objective is to determine the city's geographical extent, spatial organization, and building density. A synthesis of the findings is scheduled for publication at the conclusion of the research period.

=== Valorization ===
The site of Alauna's baths is the sole location in the first quarter of the 21st century where the remains of the ancient city are visible and accessible. The site has been developed into an archaeological garden that is open to the public and which is equipped with appropriate signage, including an information desk. It serves as a starting point for tours that are organised by the AAA association in partnership with the Clos du Cotentin art and history country, notably during the European Heritage Days. The Alauna baths, along with the ancient theatre of Lillebonne, are the only preserved ancient remains in Normandy.

The archaeological artifacts collected at Alauna are stored in a variety of locations, including the town hall, the Valognes heritage house, museums, the Ministry of Culture warehouse, and private collections. With the exception of a few pieces that are displayed at temporary or occasional events, this material is not accessible to the public.

== Ancient city ==
Proposed plan of the ancient city. (Note: The map depicts only those facilities with a public purpose. Areas with an artisanal or commercial character and private residences are not represented.)

The oldest and, in the early 21st century, the only remains whose function is truly attested, either because they are still partially in elevation or have been excavated, are those of probably public baths and a spectacle building. Research conducted at the end of the 20th and early 21st centuries indicates that Alauna also encompassed other public buildings or those that could be identified as such. These include at least one forum, two or even four sanctuaries, and a potential second bath establishment, in addition to numerous residential quarters, some of which were occupied by large domus. Craft activities are gradually revealed on the city's outskirts, along the roads leading into it.

The archaeological site encompasses an area of approximately 45 hectares, as estimated in the late 2010s. However, recent data suggests that this figure may have increased to approximately 60 hectares. This information was obtained in 2020 and 2021. In the 21st century, the site is almost entirely covered by meadows and hedges, forming a fragmented bocage landscape. These agricultural activities have been attested for several centuries. While they led to the disappearance of building elevations after a long phase of material recovery, they limit the thickness of anthropic deposits and allow the generally intact or slightly altered preservation of ancient foundations under a thin layer of arable land, lightly disturbed by agricultural work, except for occasional exceptions.

=== Urban framework ===
Archaeological studies have revealed the existence of an almost orthogonal street network, aligned with the four cardinal points. One of these north-south roads passes east of the baths and heads towards the hamlet of La Victoire. It is partially covered by the Bas-Castelet road and the Victoire road, and has been identified as the cardo maximus. Beyond the baths, the path is located a few dozen meters further north and is also represented by a stone pavement in the bed of the Merderet. It is possible that this is not a ford, but rather a portion of a "terrestrial" road, given that the course of the Merderet has been significantly altered over the centuries. It seems very likely that it continues towards the north of the Cotentin Peninsula. Another road, perpendicular to the aforementioned route and partially covered by the Dingouvillerie alley, is likely the decumanus maximus. This road has been observed in several places thanks to surveys. Measuring 11 m in width, it is most often covered with calibrated pebbles. One of its intra-muros sections shows it bordered by sidewalks protected by a portico. Further east, another section is paved with large, roughly squared stones placed side by side instead of pebbles. This modification may be interpreted as an attempt to monumentalize the approach to the theater, although it is likely to have been implemented at a later date than the construction of the road.

The majority of these roads appear to exhibit a rolling layer of regularly sized pebbles, occasionally interspersed with tile fragments. This layer is reminiscent of the decumanus maximus in the city's heart. However, the urban grid does not correspond to an ideal orthogonal scheme, and most axes exhibit a slight deviation from this plan. Topographical constraints and the desire to interconnect this urban network with the main roads linking neighboring towns undoubtedly play a significant role in this observation.

The part of the ancient city served by this network appears to be the most densely urbanized, with the exception of the northern sector, where roads are present but urbanization indicators are almost nonexistent. This sector, located on the supposed path of the aqueduct supplying the baths and near the sources feeding it, may reflect a prohibition against building too close to the aqueduct to preserve water quality. (Note: The establishment of such a protective perimeter is a regulatory provision, as evidenced by the presence of two boundary markers found near the Gier aqueduct in the Rhône, which repeat the text of a decree by Hadrian.) Alternatively, it could be "serviced land" planned for an urban extension that never materialized. (Note: Paez-Rezende) However, this area has been more extensively affected by modern agricultural activities than others, which may have resulted in the disappearance of urbanization remains.

=== Monuments and public amenities ===
The only remaining evidence of Alauna's monumental adornment is the remnants of masonry in elevation, some excavations or surveys, and geophysical surveys. These sources permit the identification of certain elements of the city's adornment. However, the elements of its decoration are almost entirely lacking, except for a few sections of column shafts reused in modern buildings but whose origin is uncertain. Additionally, a limestone statuette representing the head of a bearded man wearing a vegetal crown, standing 55 cm tall, may belong to one of these public edifices. Reported in 2009, this statuette was embedded in the wall of a 19th-century building in Valognes. It was detached from the wall when the house was sold in 2021 and acquired by the town of Valognes. Archaeologists and historians concur that the statuette is of antique origin, as evidenced by its style and motif. However, its provenance remains uncertain, although it is probable that it originated from Alauna or the vicinity of Valognes. Its function is also uncertain, with potential interpretations including decoration of the theater building or a mausoleum.

==== Baths ====
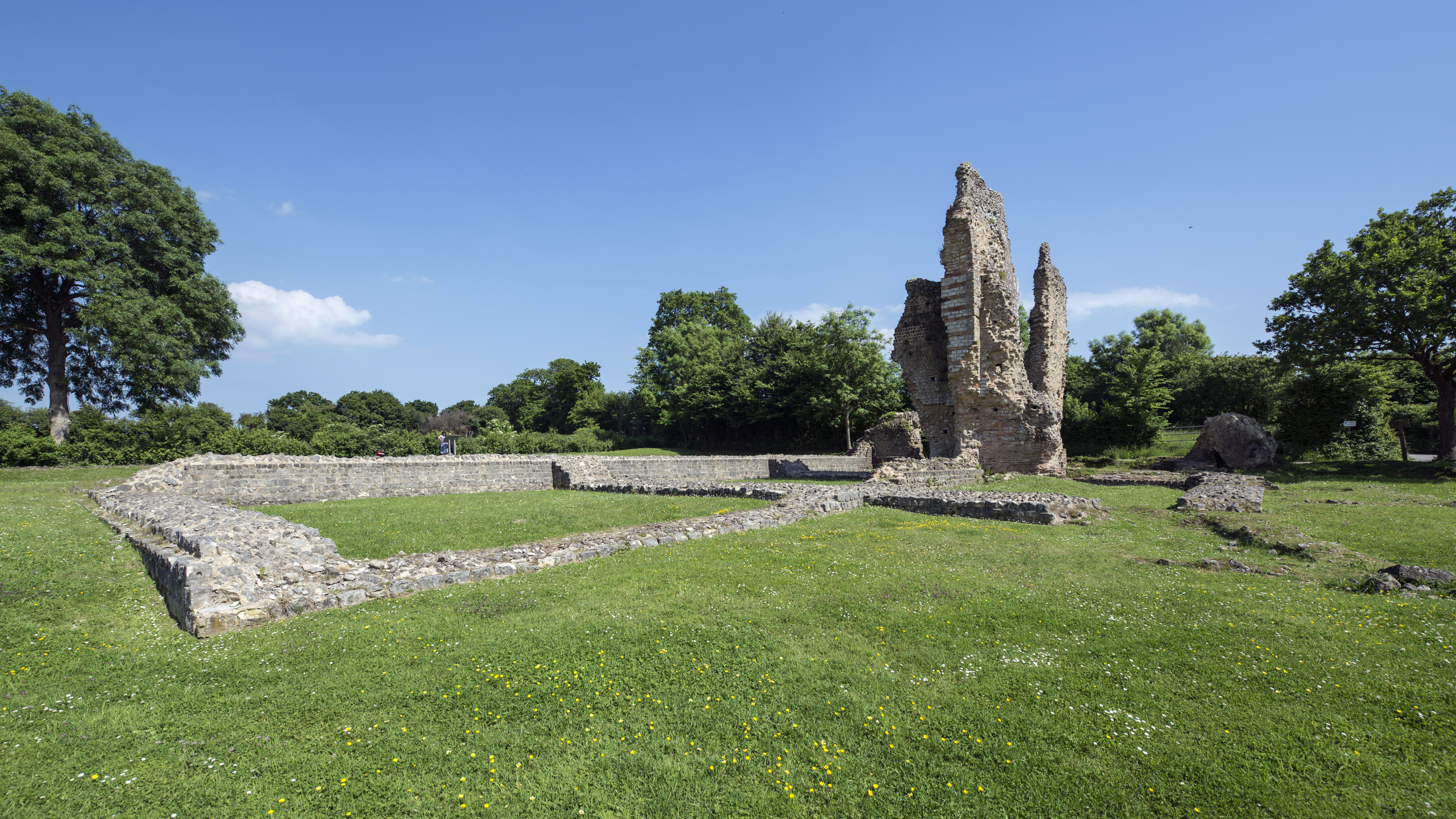
General view of the thermal baths

The baths were already known in the 17th century, (Note: Due to their robust construction and the proliferation of their rooms, Roman baths are often equated with ancient "palaces" or medieval "castles" in historical texts from past centuries until their identification as such.) but it was not until 1695 that they were partially excavated. In 1765, Anne Claude de Caylus published a plan of the baths. Excavations from 1989 to 1992 uncovered the entire site, revealing the structure of the installations and detailing the chronology of the complex. The building fits into a square of just over 35 meters on each side. The rooms are distributed symmetrically, following the plan of the "imperial baths," with six cold rooms and four hot or warm rooms. The frigidarium is arranged in a central apse. The caldarium, approximately 7.50 meters in diameter, built on a hypocaust, is heated by external furnaces. The walls have a structure of alternating layers of stone and brick (opus mixtum). The buildings were constructed during the mid-1st century and subsequently abandoned approximately two centuries later. Over the following centuries, the masonry was recovered and the site was reoccupied towards the end of the Middle Ages.

A survey conducted in 2020 revealed the existence of a peristyle structure to the northeast of and adjacent to the thermal establishment. This structure could be interpreted as the palaestra, a type of building frequently associated with baths. Between the baths and the cardo maximus, a partitioned building could be linked to the baths (various rooms, gymnasium) or be an inn by the road, at the entrance to the town.

The evolution of knowledge about Alauna suggests that the city was more significant than was indicated by the evidence available at the time of its initial investigation. In this context, the existence of only one thermal establishment in the north of the town, which is of rather modest size, gives rise to questions. This leads to the hypothesis of another more central complex, which is located at the northeast corner of the cardo maximus and the decumanus maximus. This is particularly pertinent given that such an arrangement is indicated by the excavations of 1695 and 1981 (Cau Garden), which revealed the presence of tubuli and a waterproof coating belonging to a bathhouse, whether public or private.

==== Hydraulic network ====
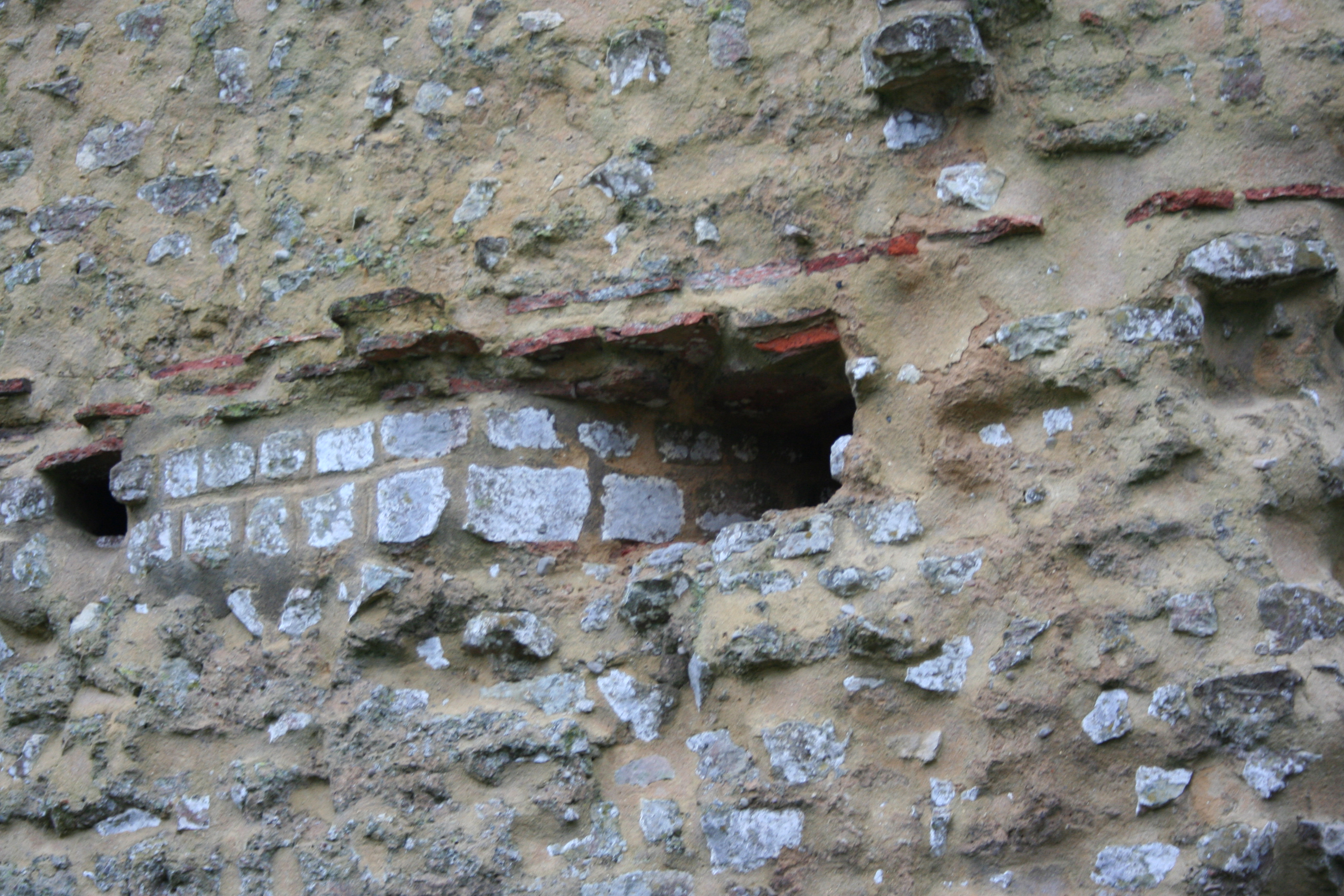
Completion of the aqueduct pipeline.

The water supply for the baths is provided by an underground aqueduct and pipelines originating from a source (Bus fountain) located 500 meters from the baths, at Bas Castelet. The remains of this conduit are visible in a preserved wall of the baths. Since 1899, water from the source has been tapped to supply the town. However, the remains of the ancient aqueduct were not identified during the most recent investigations, despite their partial description in the 17th century and vague reports in the 1950s.

In the northern part of the settlement, in an area served by Alauna's road network but sparsely built, a radar survey in 2020 revealed "anomalies" that may correspond to channels or tubular pipelines or covered trenches, as well as cisterns or reservoirs. However, the materials have been largely recovered, making interpretation difficult. At this stage, it is premature to assign a specific role to these structures in the water supply of the town in general and the baths in particular. This is true whether it is the established complex to the north of the town or a second, supposedly more central one. Several wells scattered across the site have been noted in the earliest observations, but their ancient origin cannot be certified.

The emergence of a wastewater disposal system is also becoming apparent in certain areas. To the north of the baths, the extension of the cardo maximus, which descends towards the Merderet, is flanked on both sides by traces of pipelines that have been interpreted as drainage elements.

==== Theater ====
Theater plan (2020).

To the east of the ancient settlement, in the vicinity of the Castelet manor (also known as "les Buttes"), there is an arena theater. It was meticulously surveyed in 1695, taking into account the techniques that were available at the time, and subsequently investigated further through excavations in 1844. Based on the documents that were published at the time, its capacity is estimated to be between 3,000 and 16,000 spectators, depending on the author. The arena theater is horseshoe-shaped with a semicircular cavea that exceeds a diameter of 66 meters. Its orchestra measures 25 meters, and it is equipped with a 19-meter-wide stage and five vomitoria that serve all seating areas, from the peripheral wall to the orchestra.

Excavations conducted in 2015 and a radar survey undertaken in 2020 largely corroborated and refined the descriptions established from the 17th and 19th-century surveys. The performance building, which is in fact an arena theater, is situated in a manner that largely conforms to the slope of a valley, in accordance with its bowl shape. Its diameter has been reevaluated to 72.7 meters. The structure appears to be entirely built in small limestone masonry, without the use of architectural terracotta. Its cavea is semicircular, extended by two corridors separating it from the stage wall, but no trace of the previously mentioned precincts is visible. The orchestra is a complete ellipse with a major axis measuring 24.2 meters and a minor axis measuring 23.2 meters. The five vomitoria exhibit a variable length according to the level of the cavea they serve. An edicule, which is likely an honor box, is positioned axially in contact with the orchestra.

==== Forum and tabernae ====
The entire insula, situated immediately south of the main sanctuary and enclosed by four roads, including the cardo maximus, which runs along its western side, comprises a large square measuring approximately 65 × 100 m. At least on the west and north, the square is bordered by small buildings of regular size. However, the structures have been extensively dismantled and reused, making it difficult to determine the layout on the other two sides of the square. However, due to its location and construction, this complex exhibits all the characteristics of a forum bordered by tabernae. The proportions of this square (width equal to two-thirds of its length) correspond to Vitruvius's recommendations for the construction of fora. While civic buildings (basilica, curia) have not been identified, if they exist in Alauna, they are likely to be located near this forum, possibly even within its enclosure given its size.

To the west of the main sanctuary, across the cardo maximus, a building occupying an entire insula appears to outline a central courtyard surrounded by a gallery with porticos. The structure was erected prior to the establishment of Alauna's road network, as evidenced by the intersection of a cardo with one of its components. This suggests that it may have served as a principium, or "proto-forum," constructed by military personnel who played a pivotal role in the city's foundation.

==== An atypical vestige, the "Wall of Victory" ====
An alignment of monumental masonry blocks in small rubble, partially lacking their facing stones, extends over a length of 41 meters, a width of 2.60 meters, and a height ranging from 2 to 3 meters. This structure is known as the "mur de la Victoire" (Wall of Victory). Since the nineteenth century, the structure has been variously interpreted as a fortification wall (castrum) and a mint. The latter attribution was first proposed by Pierre-Joseph Dunod, who did not, however, provide an explanation for it.

The interpretation of this wall as a castrum wall has been widely challenged in the 21st century. The blocks lack proper foundations, resting directly on previously leveled ground. They clearly belong to different structures or different parts of the same structure. Furthermore, the toponym "Castelet" does not refer to a hypothetical ancient castellum but to an ancient or medieval fortress to which the remains of the baths were attributed before the 1695 excavations.

The most plausible hypothesis is that these blocks are remnants of dismantled public buildings, perhaps from the forum or sanctuary located immediately north of this wall. It is possible that sections of masonry were gathered and aligned along the route of an ancient decumanus, although the purpose of this remains unclear. As early as 1844, Arsène Delalande suggested that these blocks do not occupy their original positions, although he did not formally state their origin.

=== Places of worship and necropolises ===
==== Sanctuaries ====
Hypothesis for the restitution of the great sanctuary. First state Second state Road

In 2017, a large sanctuary was identified through ground-penetrating radar surveys, which also revealed two successive phases of this complex open to the east. In the initial phase of construction, a square-plan fanum with a cella measuring 9 m on each side was surrounded by a gallery (19 × 19 m) within a sacred area enclosed by a peribolos measuring 41 m wide and at least 63.5 m long. The western end of the peribolos remains undetected.

Following a comprehensive restructuring, the fanum was levelled and covered by a Roman temple on a podium (14.3 × 9 m). Two small structures were constructed in front of the temple on either side of its stairs. The peribolos was circumscribed by a portico on at least three of its four sides, measuring 45 m in width and at least 71.7 m in length. Two corner pavilions framed its eastern side, constituting a layout comparable to that of the largest temple at the Altbachtal sanctuary in Germany. It seems unlikely that this sanctuary was dedicated to imperial cults, as it does not integrate with the forum located to the south, is separated from it by a street, and does not face it. Instead, it appears to have been devoted to the city's tutelary deities.

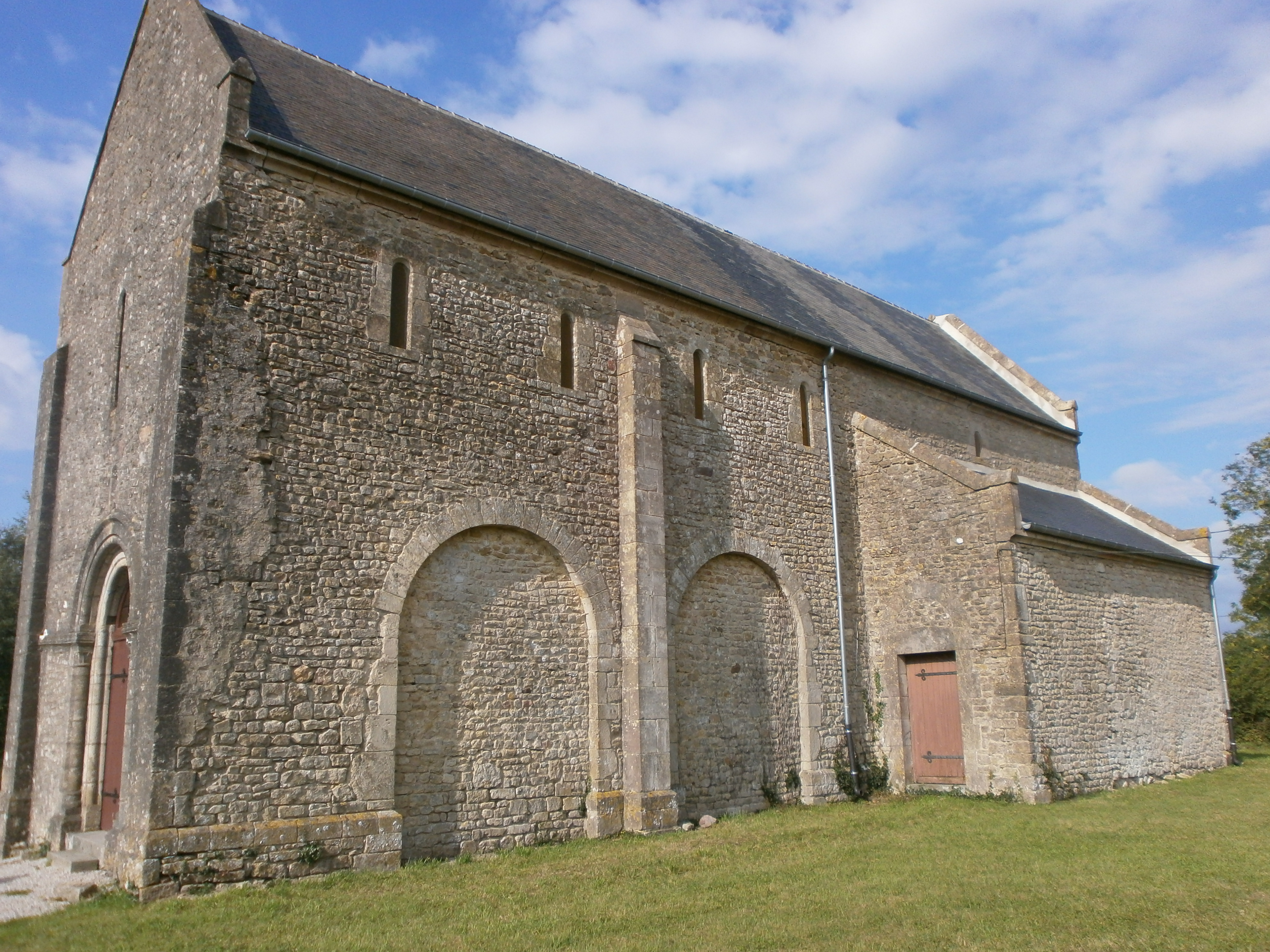
Chapelle Notre-Dame de la Victoire.

A second cultic complex, consisting of at least one fanum-type temple surrounded by a well-identified peribolos occupying an entire insula of 3,300 m², was detected in 2020 north of the decumanus maximus towards the theater. Across this same road, opposite it, a third cultic complex appears to be situated. The nature of these two complexes (public or private monuments) is unknown, and their possible connection to the first sanctuary, considered a cultic centerpiece, remains unestablished.

The masonry located beneath and surrounding the foundations of the Chapel of Our Lady of Victory, situated to the south of the site, can be attributed to a large ancient structure (measuring several hundred square meters), which is believed to have been a public building comprising multiple rooms. However, the tradition, as reported by several publications, suggesting that the chapel was built on the site of a "pagan temple," cannot be confirmed or denied due to a lack of excavation. Despite the presence of these unusually massive masonry remains on a high point of the site and near the cardo maximus, which would be consistent with the existence of a sanctuary, the hypothesis cannot be definitively confirmed or denied. The continuity of the site's religious function over the centuries also supports this hypothesis.

==== Necropolises ====
No formal identification of a necropolis has been made at Alauna. In general, urban burial sites during the Roman Empire were located outside the city's physical or symbolic enclosure, along the main roads entering it. This may reflect inadequate research (excavations or test pits) at the city's margins or suggest that these necropolises are even further from the center than initially thought.

However, ground-penetrating radar surveys have revealed two sets of "anomalies," both near the presumed limit of the city's maximum extension based on current knowledge. One of them lies near a road that could extend the decumanus maximus to the west, outside the city. However, the scant evidence uncovered does not definitively link these anomalies to a necropolis, which is an intriguing hypothesis. Moreover, it is possible that mausoleums or funerary chapels may have been located along a road leading towards Bayeux, southeast of the settlement, east of a district mainly devoted to artisanal activities. Nevertheless, probable dwellings seem to have been constructed closer to the urban limit, which is contrary to the general rule that Roman city necropolises are usually located beyond the built-up perimeter. This particular situation may suggest that the city expanded after the establishment of the necropolis, on land originally dedicated to funerary purposes.

=== Craftsmanship and commerce ===
==== Production activities ====
A multitude of indications of artisanal activity have been observed, including copper and iron metallurgy, lime production, woodworking, and stone carving. These artifacts are consistently found in refuse pits, dumps, or backfilled trenches, and the workshops from which they originate have yet to be fully uncovered. Additionally, numerous bone fragments (primarily from cattle, goats, and sheep in decreasing order of frequency) have been discovered in these contexts, indicating significant butchery activity.

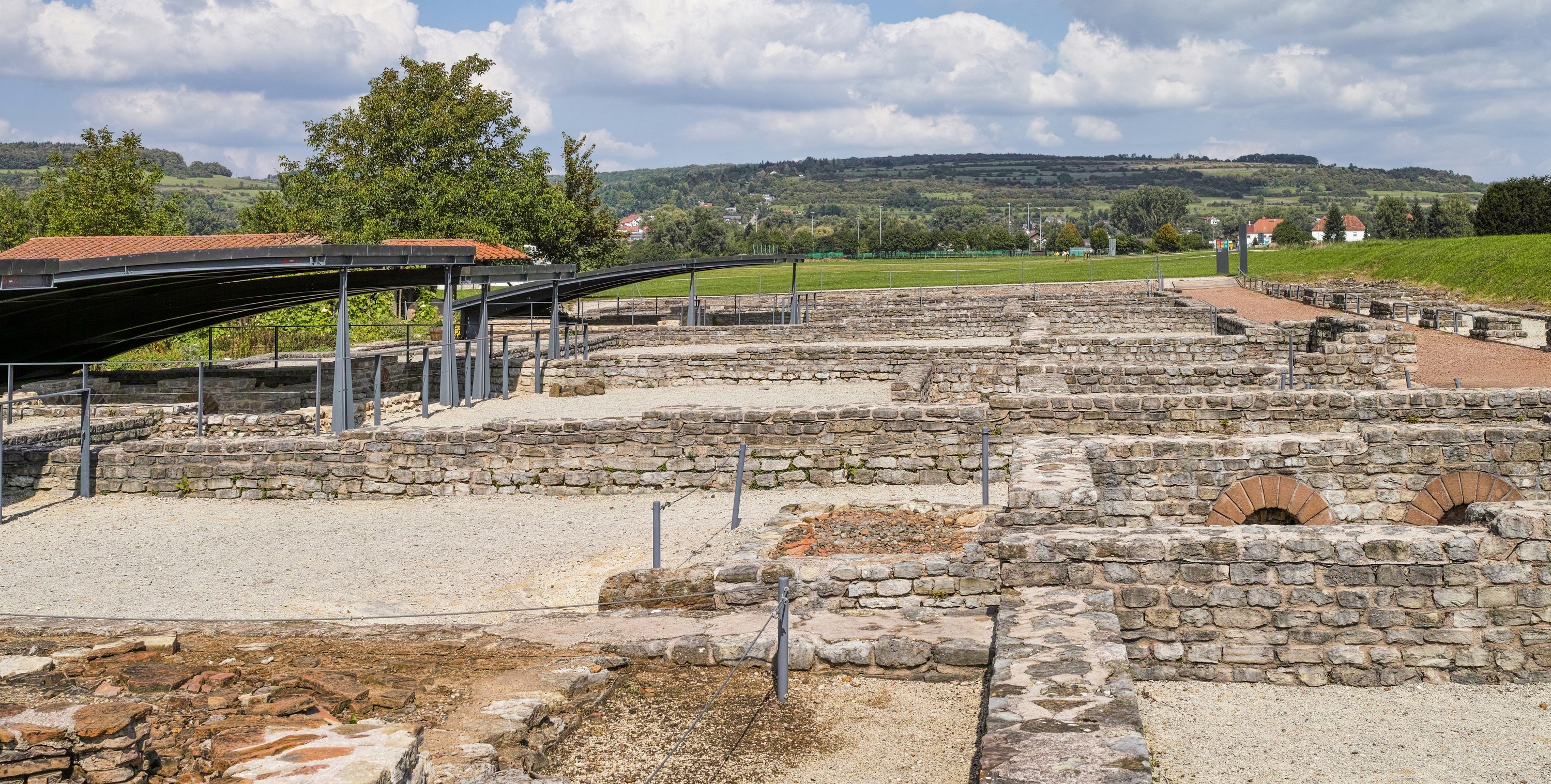
Bliesbruck-Reinheim craftsmen's western quarter.

These potentially odorous or visually disruptive activities, which pose fire hazards to nearby buildings (butcheries, forges), are absent from the most densely urbanized part of the city. However, they are found in a first "suburban ring," where they are juxtaposed with evidence of agricultural activity (field plots or pastures).

The precise nature of these activities remains uncertain, given the limitations of the available data. However, the presence of shop galleries along the forum does indicate the existence of commercial or craft activities in the city center. The decumanus extendedtowards the Baie des Veys, has become home to an artisanal quarter, comprising buildings that have undergone repeated restructuring and separation by alleys opening onto the decumanus. This resembles the "western quarter" of Bliesbruck-Reinheim.

==== Commercial exchanges ====
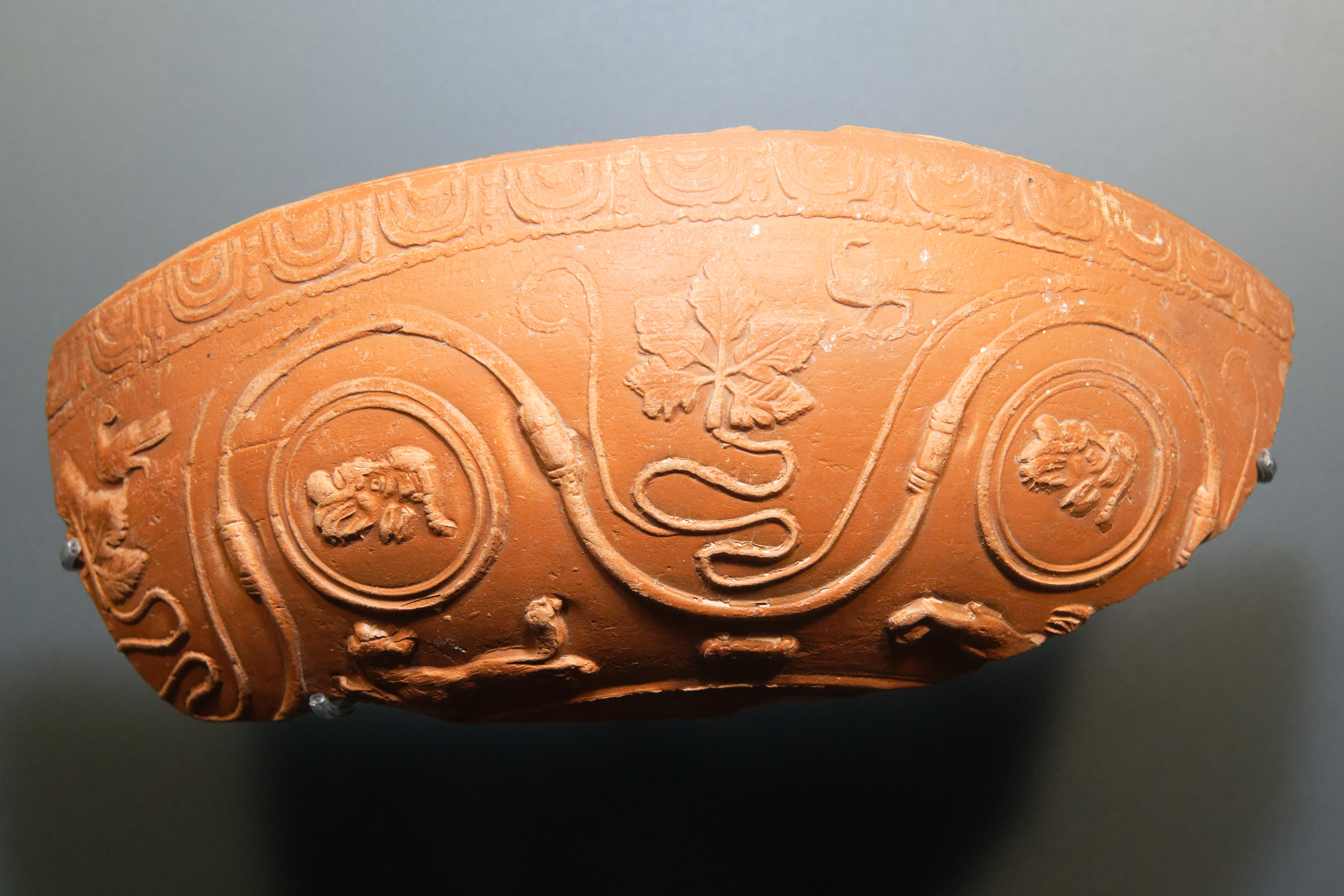
Drag. 37 bowl (Lezoux ware), type found at Alauna

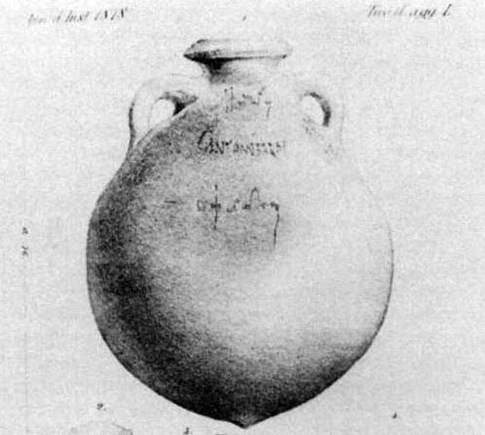
Dressel 20 oil amphora

Despite the fragmentary nature of the excavations and test pits across the settlement, the quantity and typology of the domestic ware remains, especially pottery, allow for an assessment of the intensity of the commercial exchanges that took place in the area.

The number and variety of amphorae or amphora fragments discovered provide evidence of substantial commercial transactions, with containers originating from Bética (Dressel 20 for oil) and Narbonensis (Gauloise 3/5 for wine), although locally produced types (Gauloise 12) are also identified.

The majority of sigillated pottery was produced in southern Gaul during the late 1st century. By the 2nd century, there was a greater supply of pottery from central Gaul, including workshops in Lezoux that produced sigillata and other regional or local pottery. Additionally, Black Burnished ware (category 1), manufactured in Roman Britain, indicates commercial relations between Alauna and the English production sites of this type of pottery in Dorset. From the mid-3rd century onwards, the scarcity of pottery finds, both in number and diversity, and from various models, is a significant indicator of Alauna's gradual decline.

The study of coins collected on the site may serve as a significant marker of the city's economic activity. However, it is also a challenging endeavor. The majority of specimens discovered in previous excavations until the 19th century are currently dispersed in private collections and were not precisely described at the time of their discovery. In contrast, coins found during 21st-century probes are relatively few in number. The Gallic and Republican periods are represented by a few specimens, but the majority of coins date from the Early Empire (bronze pieces). Late Empire coins are much scarcer. Despite the uncertainties due to the limited sampling, the dating appears to confirm the evolution of Alauna's economic activity, as had been suspected.

==== Private housing ====
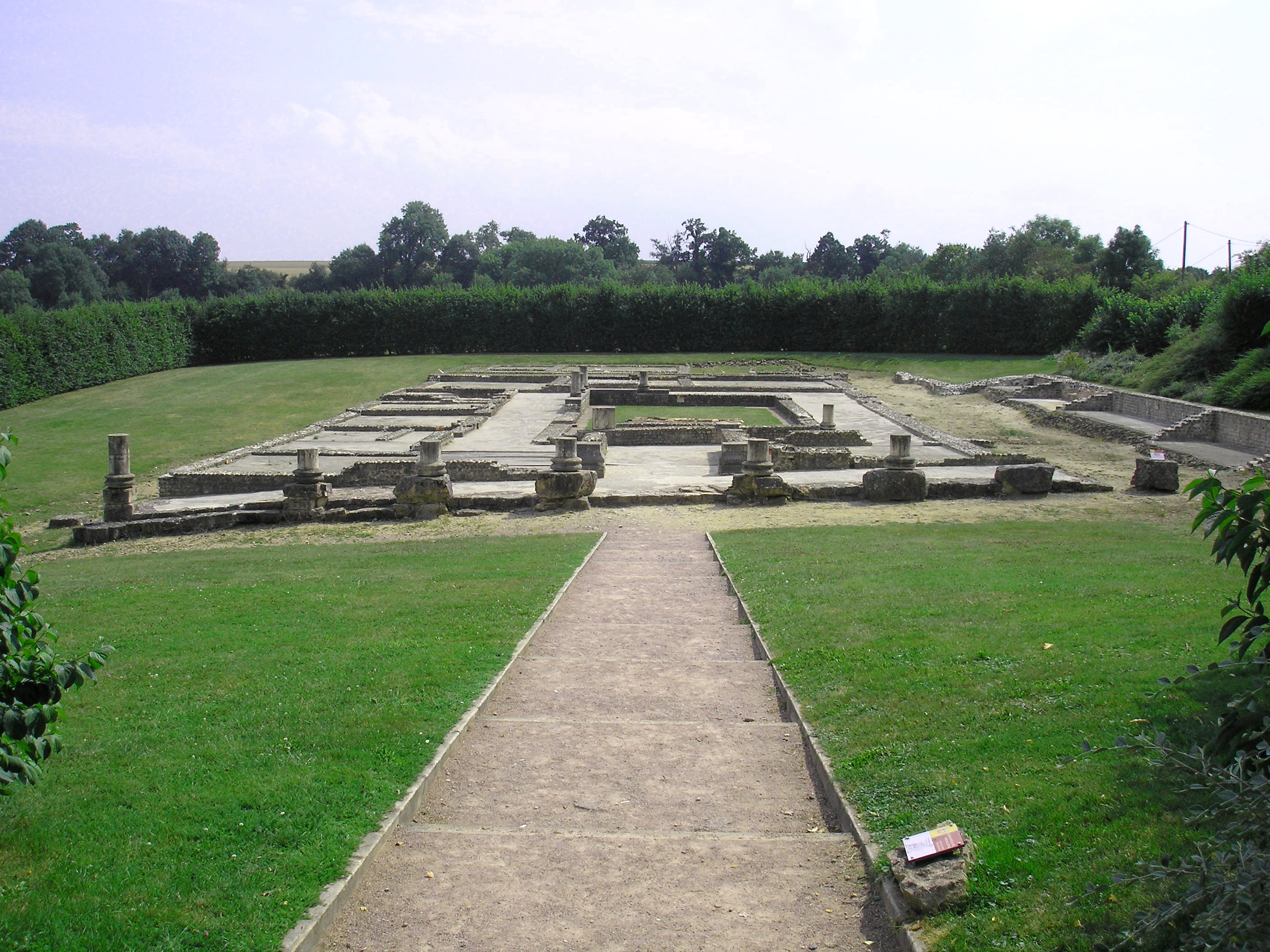
House with the Grand Peristyle in Vieux-la-Romaine

An archaeological probe conducted in the early 2010s, indicate the presence of residential structures (evidenced by the presence of concrete floors, limestone or sandstone rubble walls, and remnants of hearths) in the central quarters of the city. Ground-penetrating radar surveys have corroborated these findings by identifying multiple structured complexes that resemble domus. One of the structures, measuring approximately 1,230m, is organized around an atrium, reminiscent of the grand peristyle house of Vieux-la-Romaine. While comparable in plan, others are smaller in size, ranging from 400 to 700m2.

A second group of constructions appears to consist of more modest dwellings, lacking a uniform plan. These structures are likely associated with artisanal or commercial activities.Jeanne The existence of these diverse habitats has been corroborated in at least eight insulae situated to the west, east, and south of the monumental center (comprising a large sanctuary and forum).

In 2020, a residential or mixed-use district integrating artisanal activities was identified at the supposed southern margins of the settlement, near the chapel of Notre-Dame de la Victoire. Its structure is complex, and its topography only partially integrates into the orthogonal layout of the city, which requires further explanation. Investigations conducted in areas with relatively dense urbanization and a relatively rigorous plan have revealed the presence of buildings that appear to be of residential character. However, these buildings exhibit a more scattered layout and do not align with a global urban grid. These characteristics are indicative of a peri-urban habitat where a less stringent space management is evident.

== See also ==
- Ancient Baths of Alauna
- Archaeological site
- History of Normandy
- Ancient theater of Alauna
- Ancient Settlement of Alauna
