= Ancient Settlement of Alauna =

French cultural association

- Abbreviation: AAA
- Formation: September 1, 2019
- Founded at: Department of La Manche
- Purpose: Study, protection, promotion, and enhancement of the Alauna site
- Headquarters: Valognes (Manche)
- Members: 100 (2020)
- Secretary General: Dominique Lepoittevin
- Publication: Bulletin annuel d'activités
- Website: https://agglomeration-alauna.fr/

The Ancient Settlement of Alauna (AAA – Agglomération Antique d'Alauna) is a French non-profit cultural association established under the 1901 law on associations, with its headquarters located in Valognes, Manche.

Founded in 2019, the association supports research on the ancient site of Alauna and oversees its preservation and promotion. It also manages excavation and archaeological study projects conducted at the site.

== History ==
The archaeological site of the ancient settlement of Alauna, near Valognes in Manche, remained largely preserved from urbanization until the 21st century, though this situation has begun to change. To support the preservation, study, and promotion of its ancient settlement, the Association for the Ancient Settlement of Alauna (AAA) was established on September 1, 2019. Its first general meeting was held on November 29, 2019.

== Objectives and missions ==
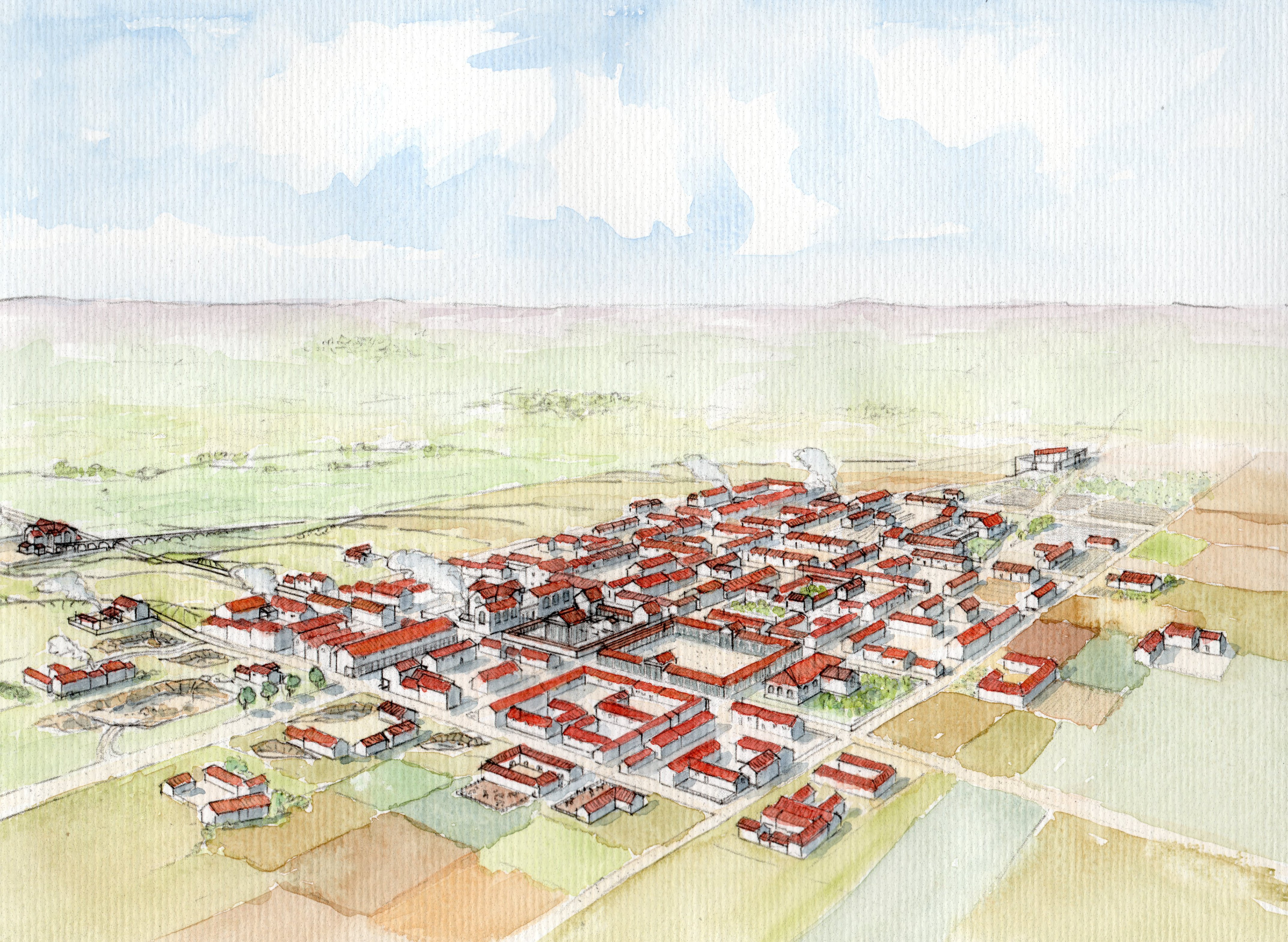
Proposal for the restoration of the Alauna agglomeration.

The association aims to promote awareness and appreciation of the archaeological site of Alauna and its surrounding area through thematic publications, the management of a website, blog, and social media, as well as the installation of on-site signage. It also organizes visits in partnership with Clos du Cotentin, a land of art and history, particularly during the European Heritage Days.

The association oversees archaeological operations at Alauna, managing subsidies provided by the State and the Departmental Council of Manche, and assuming administrative and scientific responsibility for these activities. It also contributes to the preparation of reports on the archaeological work carried out at the site.

The association participates in discussions organized by the Valognes town hall within the framework of the intercommunal local urban development plan, contributing to the preservation of the site in the event of risks related to urbanization.

== Projects ==
After ten years of research combining archaeological surveys and ground-penetrating radar investigations, the association plans to begin drafting a monograph around 2023 summarizing work conducted between 1695 and 2022. This synthesis is intended to provide a documentary basis for identifying priority areas for excavation projects scheduled for 2024 and 2025 under the project management of AAA.

== See also ==
- Valognes
- Alauna, France
- Master builder
- Departmental Council of Manche
