= Château de Valognes =

Former castle in Normandy

Coordinates: 49.5076°N 1.4703°W

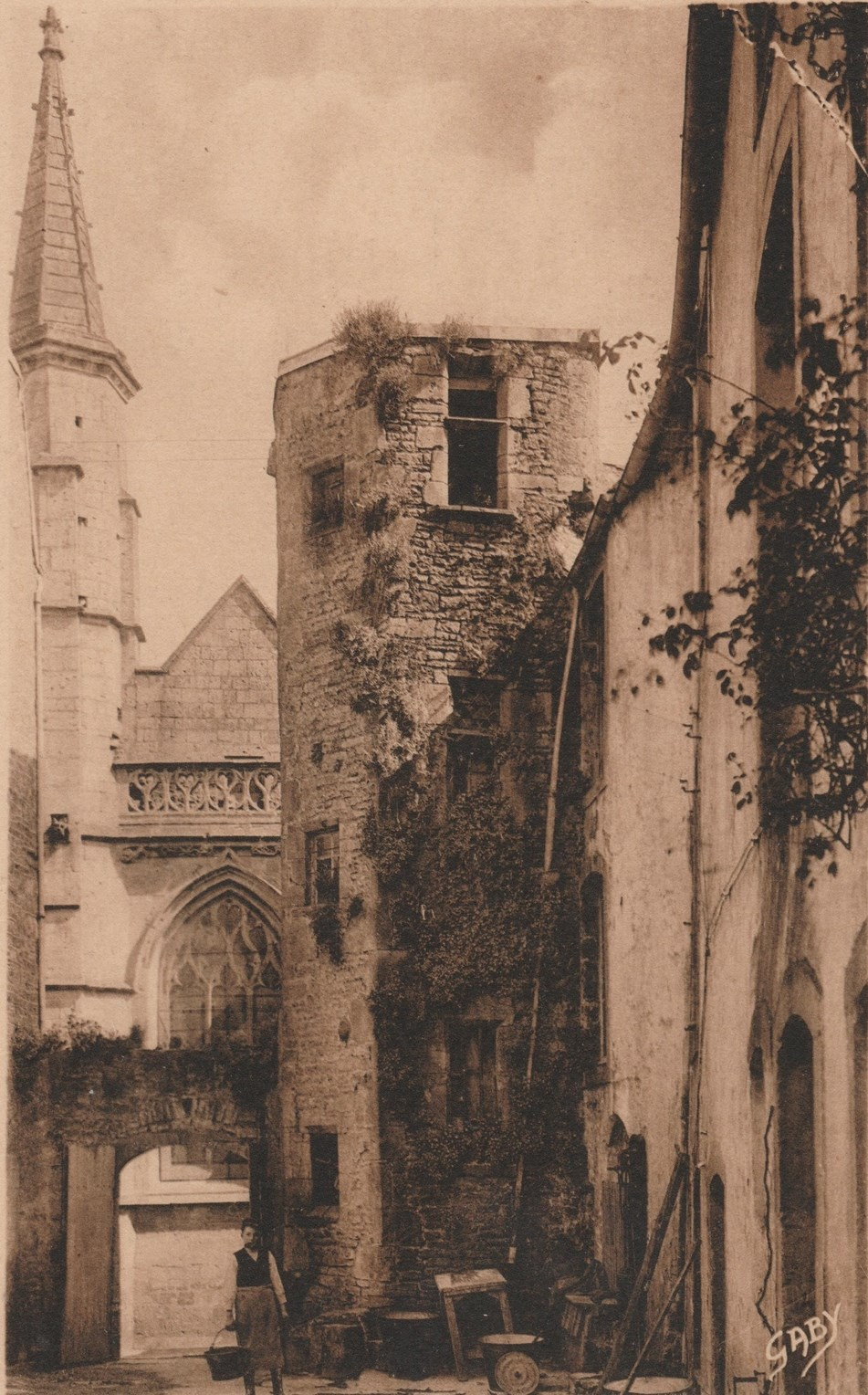
Tower of Château de Valognes (destroyed by bombing in 1944)

The Château de Valognes (French pronunciation: [ʃato də valɔɲ]) was a castle in Valognes, Manche, France.

A castle has existed at Valognes since the 11th century. Bertrand du Guesclin captured it in 1364 and 1374 from the English garrisons. The castle was destroyed under orders of King Louis XIV of France in 1689, leaving only a small tower, which was destroyed by bombing in 1944.
