= Fermanville =

- Commune
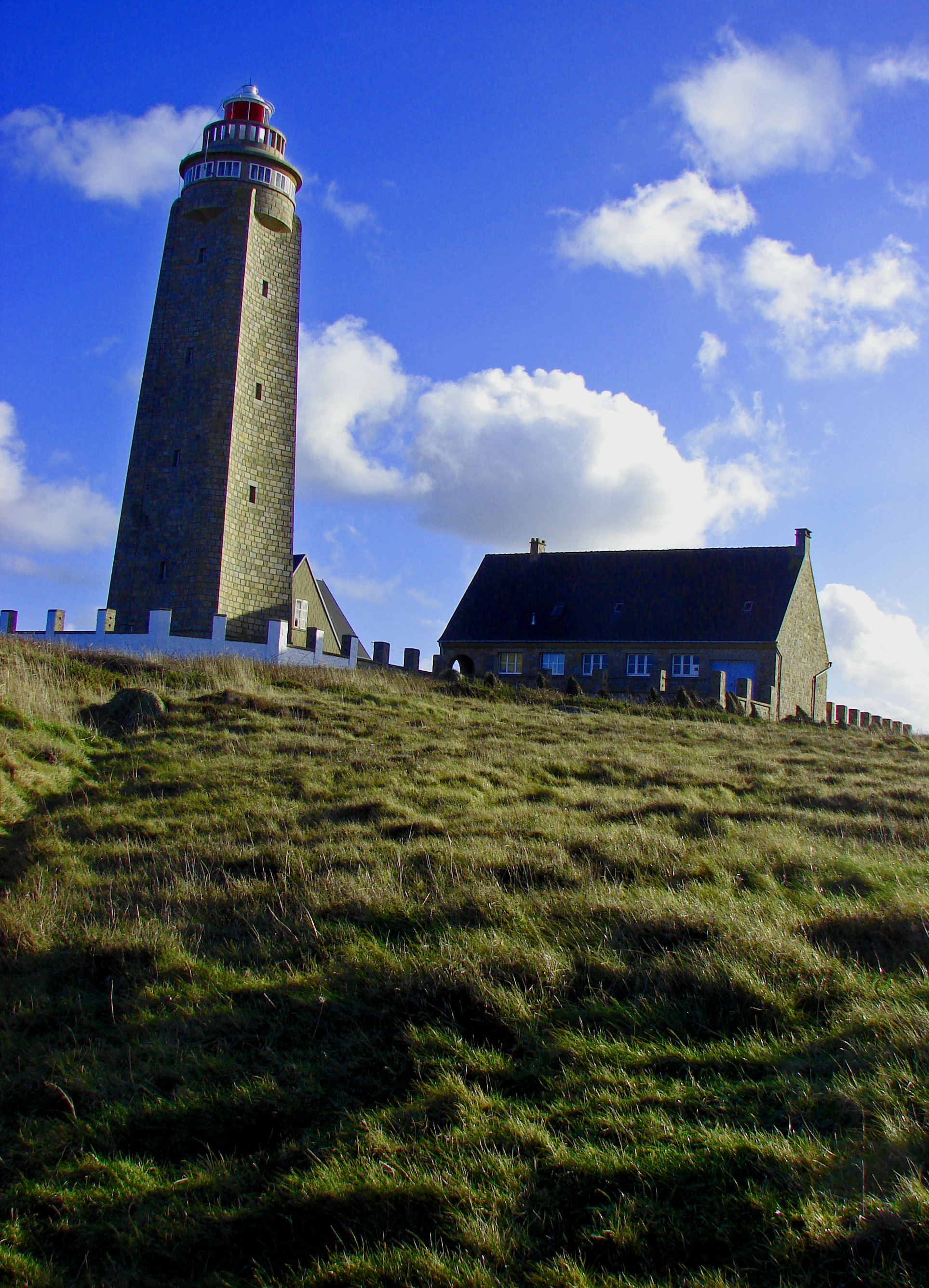
- The Cape Lévi lighthouse
- Location of Fermanville
- Location within France Location within Normandy
- Coordinates: 49°41′08″N 1°27′13″W
- Country: France
- Region: Normandy
- Department: Manche
- Arrondissement: Cherbourg
- Canton: Val-de-Saire
- Intercommunality: CA Cotentin

Government
  - Mayor (2020–2026): Nicole Belliot-Delacour
- Area^{1}: 11.60 km^{2} (4.48 sq mi)
- Elevation: 50 m (160 ft)
- Highest elevation: 136 m (446 ft)
- Lowest elevation: 0 m (0 ft)
- Population (2023): 1,283
  - Density: 110.6/km^{2} (286.5/sq mi)
- Time zone: UTC+01:00 (CET)
  - Summer (DST): UTC+02:00 (CEST)
- INSEE/Postal code: 50178 /50840
- ^{1} French Land Register data, which excludes lakes, ponds, glaciers > 1 km^{2} (0.386 sq mi or 247 acres) and river estuaries.

Fermanville (French pronunciation: [fɛʁmɑ̃vil]) is a commune in the Manche department in north-western France.

Located on the Channel coast between Cherbourg-en-Cotentin and Barfleur, Fermanville is divided into small hamlets on either side of the Cap lévi, the headland forming the eastern end of the bay of Cherbourg, and the valley of the small river Poult. It marks the entrance to the natural region of the Val de Saire. The village's economy is based on agriculture, fishing and tourism.

Fermanville has two important Paleolithic sites in France, including the oldest known submerged habitat in Europe. Cap Levi and its coves were during Antiquity and the Middle Ages a point of passage to Great Britain. A strategic point with the development of the military port of Cherbourg from the end of the 18th century, the coastline of the commune was fortified several times until the World War II: the German batteries protecting Cherbourg experienced the last fighting of the liberation of the Nord-Cotentin in June 1944.

The commune is home to three monuments historiques: the manor house of Inthéville, the stele for Marie Ravenel and the Cap Lévi lighthouse. Other notable buildings include the Cap Lévi Fort and Fermanville Viaduc.

== History ==
French submarine Prométhée sank off Fermanville on 7 July 1932.

== Places of interest ==
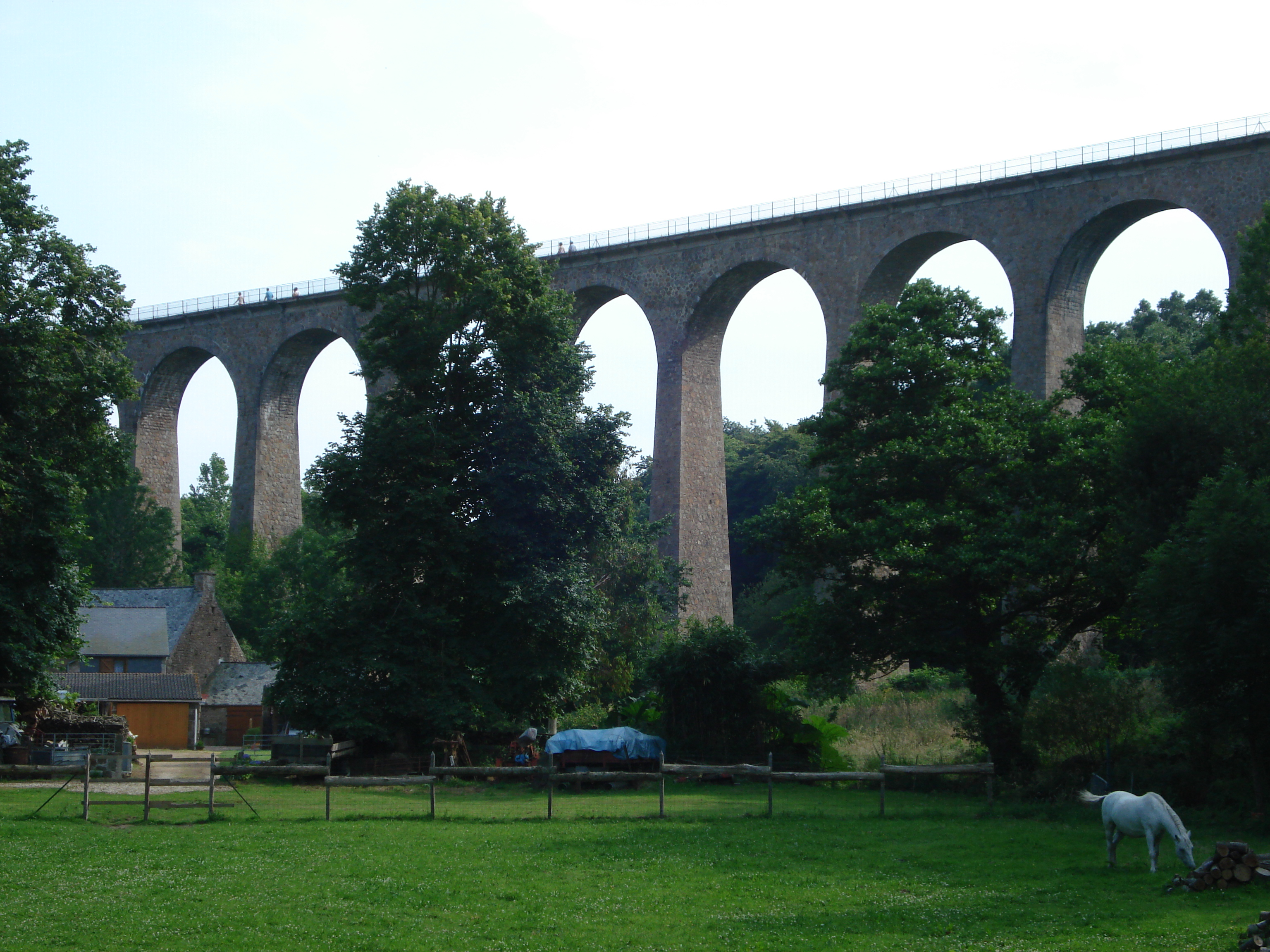
Fermanville Viaduct

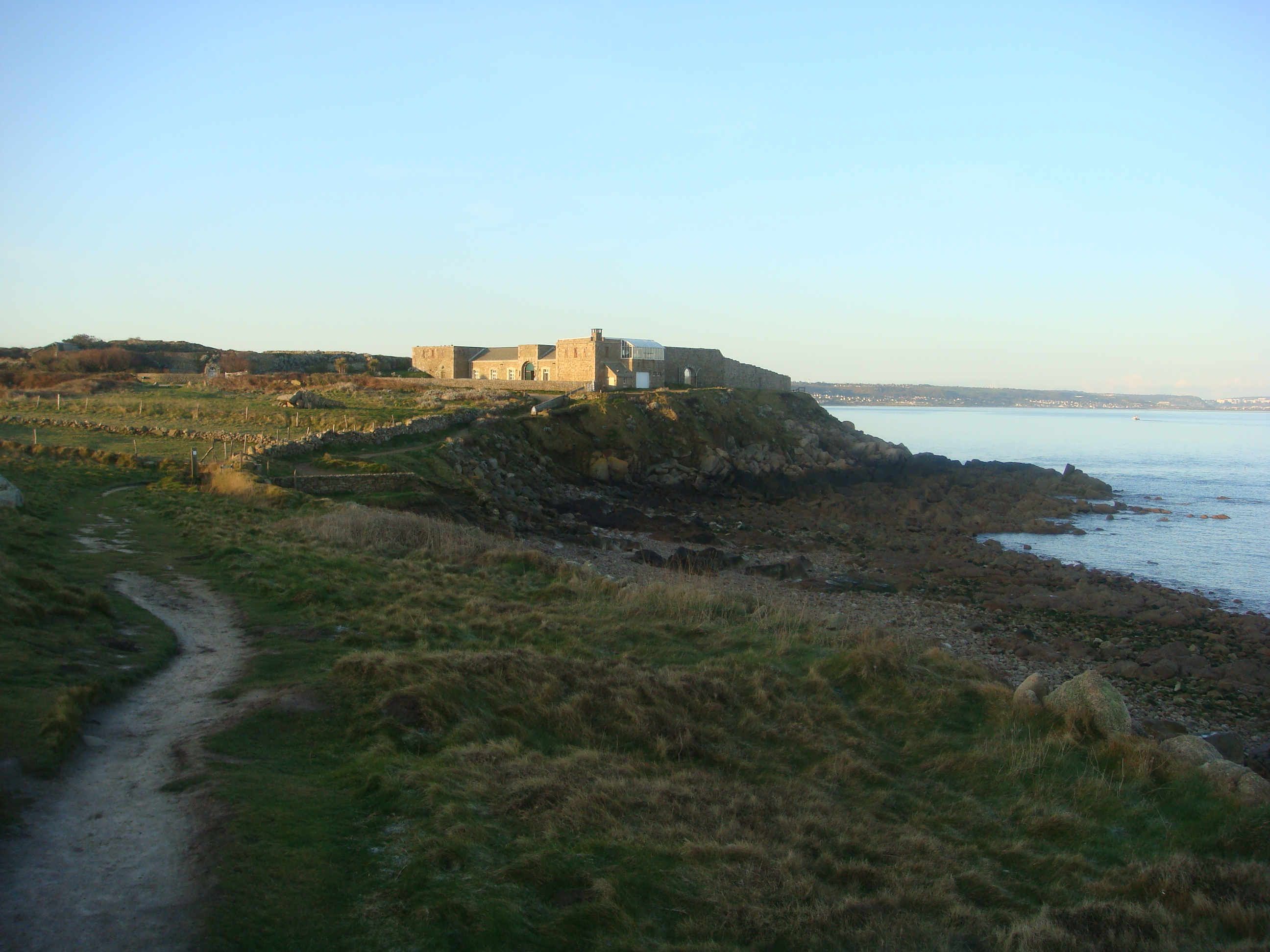
Fort Lévi.

- Fort Lévi : fort built in 1801 on Napoleon's orders;
- Railway viaduct located in the vallée des moulins village, used until 1951 for the Cherbourg-Barfleur train;

== See also ==
- Communes of the Manche department
