= Departmental Council of Manche =

Departmental legislature in France

Departmental Council of Manche Conseil départemental de la Manche

Leadership
- President: Jean Morin, DVD since 1 July 2021

Structure
- Seats: 54
- Political groups: Government (40): DVD (29); LR (7); DVC (4); Opposition (14): PS (6); DVG (5); DVC (1); MoDem (1); RE (1); www.manche.fr

The Departmental Council of Manche (French: Conseil Départemental de la Manche) is the deliberative assembly of the Manche department in the region of Normandy. It consists of 54 members (general councilors) from 27 cantons and its headquarters are in Saint-Lô.

The President of the General Council is Jean Morin.

== Vice-Presidents ==
The President of the Departmental Council is assisted by 10 vice-presidents chosen from among the departmental advisers. Each of them has a delegation of authority.

List of vice-presidents of the Manche Departmental Council (as of 2021)
Order	Name	Party	Canton (constituency)	Delegation
1st	Jacky Bouvet	DVD	Saint-Hilaire-du-Harcouët	1st vice president
2nd	Catherine Brunaud-Rhyn	DVD	Avranches	Attractiveness and promotion of the territory
3rd	Jacques Coquelin	DVD	Valognes	Responsible purchasing and finance
4th	Sylvie Gâté	DVD	Granville	Personal autonomy and integration
5th	Damien Ferey	DVD	Bricquebec-en-Cotentin	Charge of the digital transition
6th	Nicole Godard	DVD	Pont-Hébert	Social cohesion
7th	Axel Fortin-Lariviere	DVC	Cherbourg-en-Cotentin-3	Travel
8th	Adèle Hommet	DVD	Saint-Lô-1	Colleges, youth and sports
9th	Alain Navarret	DVC	Bréhal	Territories and local sectors
10th	Valérie Nouvel	DVD	Pontorson	Transition and adaptation to climate change
