= Calcaire de Valognes =

Geologic formation in France

- Stratigraphic range: Hettangian
- Type: Geological formation

Lithology
- Primary: Limestone

Location
- Country: France

The Calcaire de Valognes is an Early Jurassic (Hettangian) geologic formation in France. Dinosaur remains diagnostic to the genus level are among the fossils that have been recovered from the formation.

== Paleofauna ==
- Megalosaurus cf. cloacinus

== See also ==
- List of dinosaur-bearing rock formations
  - List of stratigraphic units with few dinosaur genera
