= Val de Saire =

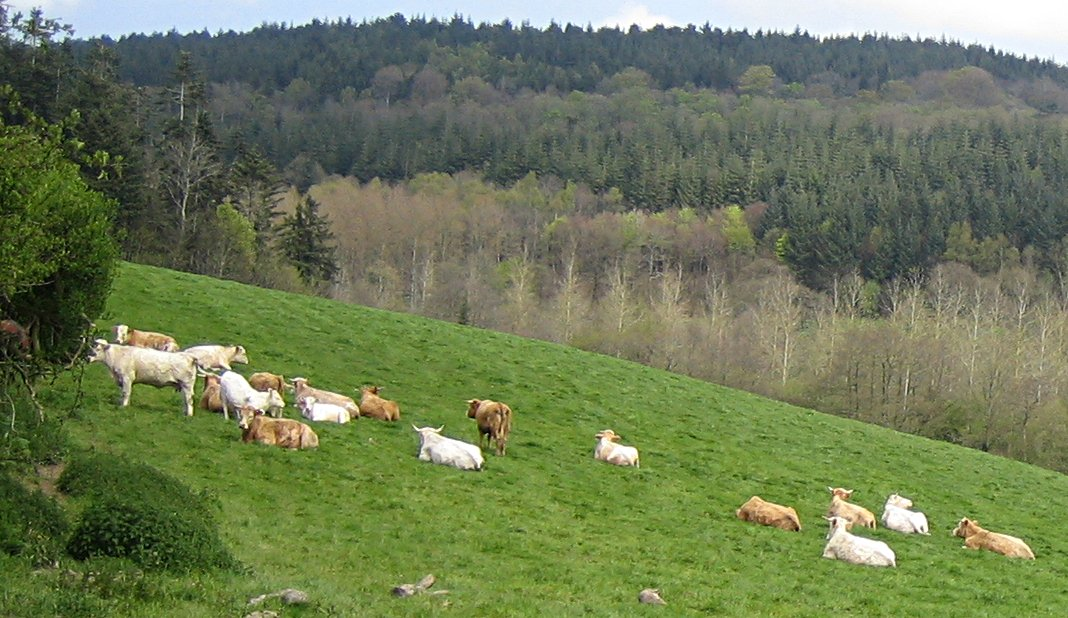
Cows and trees in the Val de Saire near the village of Le Vast

The Val de Saire (French pronunciation: [val də sɛʁ], "Vale of Saire") is an area situated in the north of the Cotentin Peninsula, to the east of Cherbourg in the French region of Lower Normandy. To the south lies the Plain. It is named after the river Saire, which flows from Mesnil-au-Val into the English Channel between Réville and Saint-Vaast-la-Hougue.

The region is renowned for its seafood, in particular the oysters from around Saint-Vaast-la-Hougue and Tatihou, which are said to have a nutty flavour, and for the mussels harvested along the coast of Barfleur, known as Blondes de Barfleur.

== Places of interest ==
- Barfleur harbour
- Phare de Gatteville or Pointe de Barfleur Light, an active lighthouse at the tip of Barfleur
- Saint-Vaast-la-Hougue harbour
- Tatihou island
