= Valognes =

- Commune
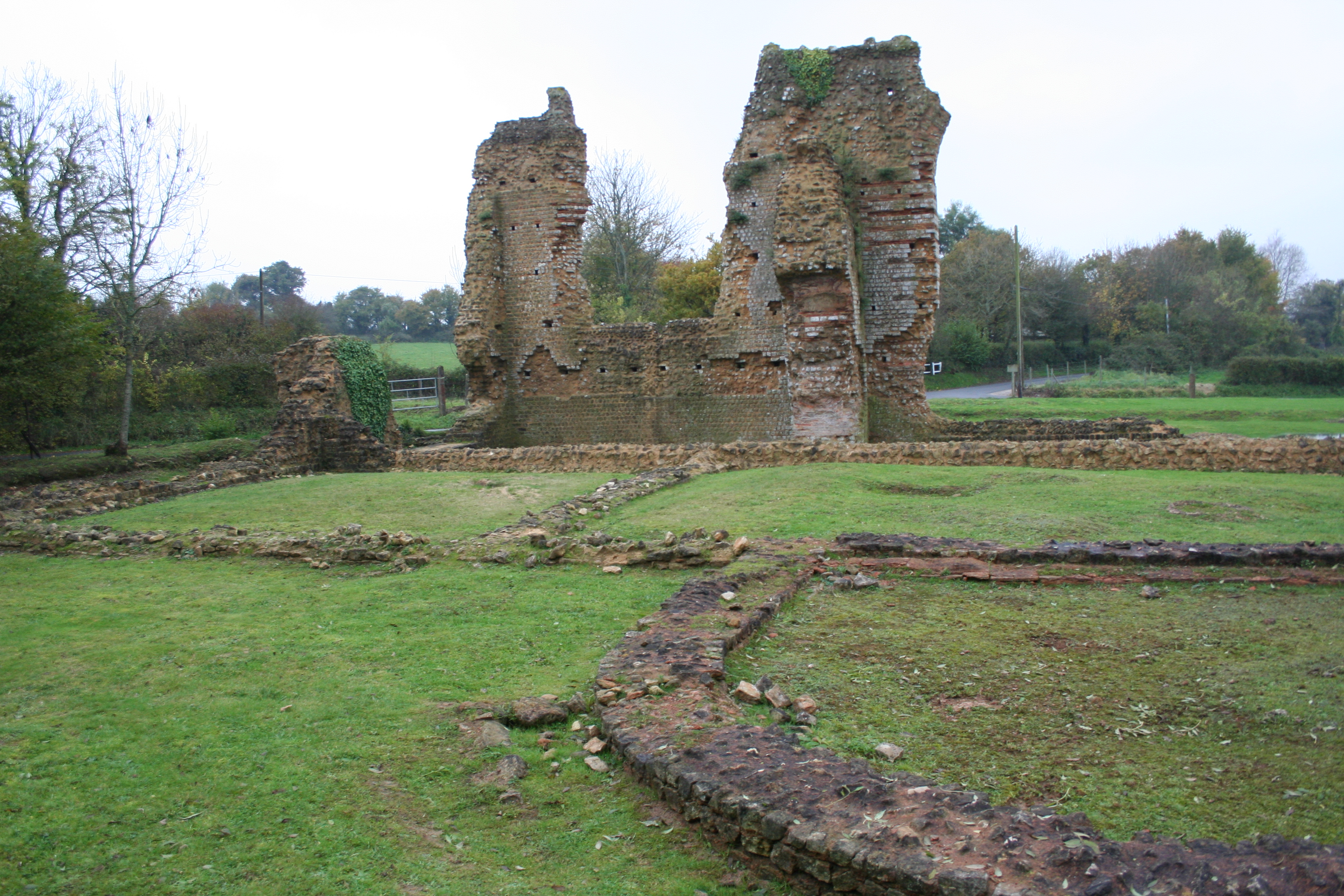
- Thermes de Valognes
- Location of Valognes
- Location within France Location within Normandy
- Coordinates: 49°31′N 1°28′W
- Country: France
- Region: Normandy
- Department: Manche
- Arrondissement: Cherbourg
- Canton: Valognes
- Intercommunality: CA Cotentin

Government
  - Mayor (2020–2026): Jacques Coquelin
- Area^{1}: 15.63 km^{2} (6.03 sq mi)
- Highest elevation: 87 m (285 ft)
- Lowest elevation: 19 m (62 ft)
- Population (2023): 6,969
  - Density: 445.9/km^{2} (1,155/sq mi)
- Time zone: UTC+01:00 (CET)
  - Summer (DST): UTC+02:00 (CEST)
- INSEE/Postal code: 50615 /50700
- ^{1} French Land Register data, which excludes lakes, ponds, glaciers > 1 km^{2} (0.386 sq mi or 247 acres) and river estuaries.

Valognes (French pronunciation: [valɔɲ]) is a commune in the Manche department in Normandy in north-western France.

== Geography ==
Valognes is situated in the Cotentin Peninsula, southeast of Cherbourg. Valognes station has rail connections to Caen, Paris and Cherbourg.

== History ==
The town was built not far from the Gallo-Roman town of Alauna or Alaunia, from where the town derives its name. It was a fortified stronghold under the Norman dukes and French monarchs. Also here, William the Conqueror received the news that the barons of Cotentin and Bessin were conspiring to kill him, enabling him to escape to Falaise. Edward III of England took Valognes without resistance, spent one night there and then pillaged and burnt the city. Henry III of England possessed the town, which remained under English rule for thirty years. (It would be a kind of resort for English aristocratic visitors until the 1920s.) In 1588, during the French Wars of Religion, Valognes sided with the Catholic League. The castle, like that of Cherbourg, was completely destroyed under King Louis XIV. Of the friaries of the Capuchin and Conventual friars and the abbey of Benedictine nuns, which existed in Valognes prior to 1792, only the latter remains and was transformed into the hospice of the Rue des Religieuses.

The 14th-century church of Notre Dame had a dome (dated 1612), the only example of a Gothic dome in France. The whole building was destroyed in 1944 during the Battle of Normandy.

Before the French Revolution, Valognes was the residence of more than a hundred families of distinguished birth and fortune, and was, for a long time afterwards, the home, en villégiature, of many of the old noblesse. Thus, the town was known as the Versailles of Normandy for its aristocratic mansions and palaces, as well as the quiet, mysterious ambience and exclusivity of its streets. This was the Valognes of Barbey d'Aurevilly.

The 1928 Methuen guide book to Normandy by Cyril Scudamore rather more prosaically describes Valognes as "a clean and well-built town, whose fine old houses bear witness to its former prosperity".

Little remains of Valognes's famous architectural heritage, as many of the aristocratic mansions were reduced to rubble during the battle of Normandy. The lovely Hôtel de Beaumont, however, still stands.

== Population ==
Historical population
Year	Pop.	±% p.a.
1968	5,932	—
1975	5,871	−0.15%
1982	6,727	+1.96%
1990	7,412	+1.22%
1999	7,537	+0.19%
2007	7,235	−0.51%
2012	6,932	−0.85%
2017	6,803	−0.37%
2023	6,969	+0.40%
Source: INSEE

== Heraldry ==
Arms of Valognes	The arms of Valognes are blazoned : Azure, a lynx courant argent between in chief 2 stalks of wheat crossed in saltire and in base 2 stalks palewise Or.

== Museums ==
The town has two museums devoted to the two alcoholic drinks for which Normandy is known: one for cider, the other for the apple brandy called calvados.

== Twin towns ==
Valognes is twinned with

- Wimborne Minster in Dorset, England, United Kingdom
- Stolberg in Rhineland, Germany

== Notable people ==
- Félix Vicq-d'Azyr born on 23 April 1746
- Léopold Victor Delisle born on 24 October 1826, French medievalist and Administrator General of the Bibliotheque Nationale
- Edelestand du Méril (1801–1870), French medievalist and philologist.
- Frédéric Guilbert born 24 December 1994 in Valognes, French professional footballer.

== See also ==
- Communes of the Manche department
- Ancient Settlement of Alauna
