= French Towns and Lands of Art and History =

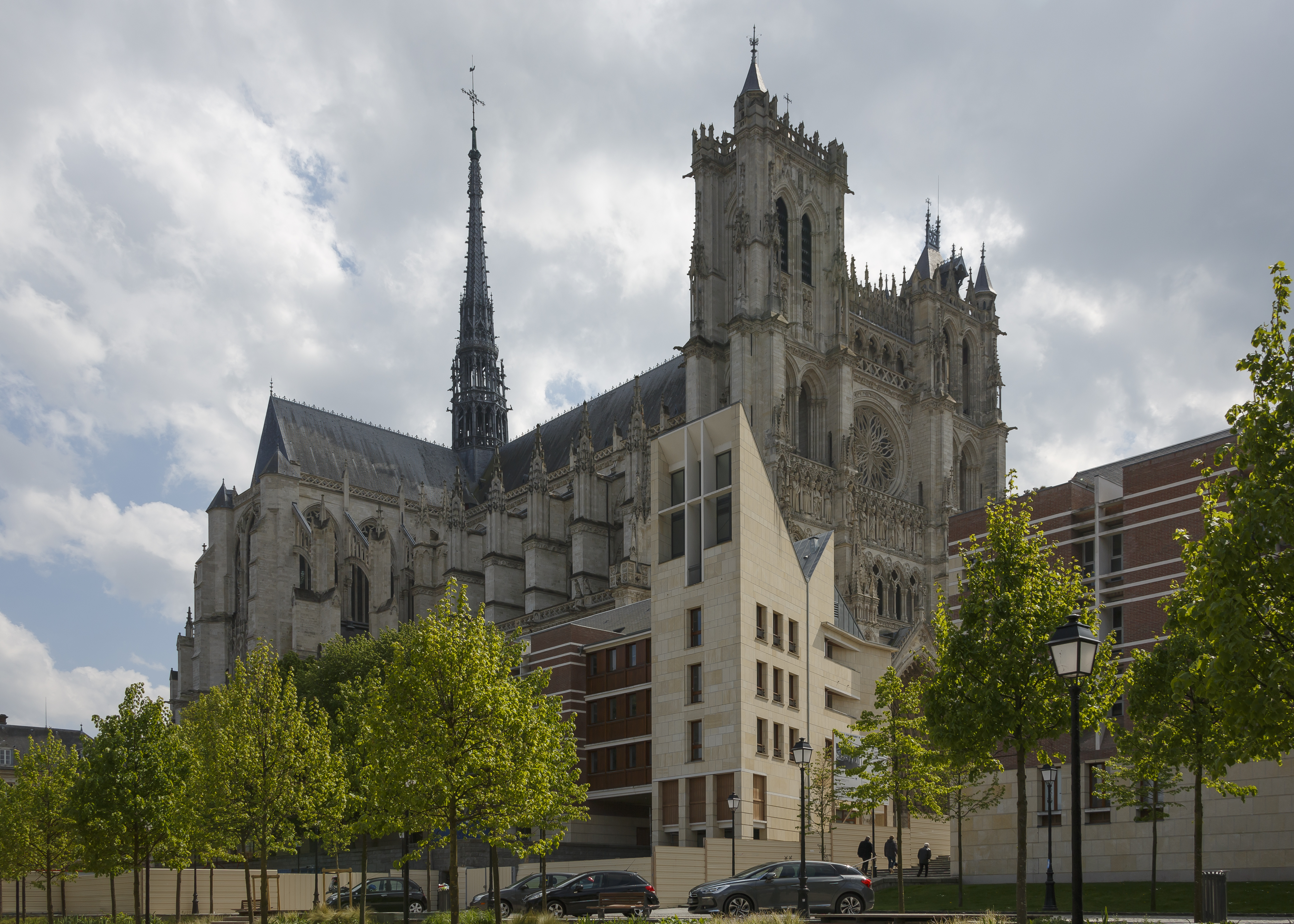
Cathedrale of Amiens, as seen from North

Since 1985, the French Ministry of Culture and Communication has pursued a policy of preserving and promoting France's heritage. Historic towns and districts have been designated Villes et Pays d'Art et d'Histoire ("Towns and Lands of Art and History").

The Ministry provides financial and technical support to regions and groups for architectural and heritage undertakings. The Ministry imposes an obligation on beneficiaries to receive workers it has deemed qualified to participate in projects. The national council of towns and districts of art and history (Le conseil national des Villes et Pays d'Art et d'Histoire), set up in 1995, participates in the development and general policy of the network. It advises on the eligibility of towns and districts for the Lands of Art and History designation, and effects withdrawal of support from landmarks where standards slip.

Policies of the network are put into effect by the regional directorates of arts and culture (Direction régionale des affaires culturelles: DRAC). The directorates seek to ensure that projects are relevant and blend into the culture of the region. They also serve as intermediaries between localities and the national organization.

In 2005, about 130 towns and districts were part of this network.

== Point for discussion ==
A more accurate and readily-understandable translation of pays would be district (Towns and Districts of Art and History), as the word pays refers to an administrative area centered on a town or village - akin to a district or subdivision of an English county.

== List of the French Towns and Lands of Art and History by region ==
The numbers in brackets are those assigned by the Ministry to the départements.

=== Auvergne-Rhône-Alpes ===
- Towns of Art and of History : Aix-les-Bains (74), Valence (26), Grenoble (38), Vienne (38), Saint-Étienne (42), Albertville (73), Chambéry (73), Moulins (03).

- Land of Art and of History : Pays de Saône-Vallée (01), Pays du Vivarais méridional (07), Pays Voironnais (38), Pays du Forez (42), Pays des Hautes vallées de Savoie (vallée de la Tarentaise, Maurienne et Beaufortain) (73), Agglomération d’Annecy (74), Pays de la Vallée d'Abondance (74), Pays Issoire Val d'Allier sud, Pays du Haut-Allier, Pays de Riom, Pays de Saint-Flour, Pays de Billom Saint-Dier-d'Auvergne (63), Pays du Puy-en-Velay (43).

=== Bourgogne-Franche-Comté ===
- Towns of Art and of History : Autun (71), Auxerre (89), Châlon-sur-Saône (71), Joigny (89), Nevers (58), Dijon (21), La Charité-sur-Loire (58), Besançon (25), Dole (39).

- Land of Art and of History : Pays de l'Auxois (21), Pays Charolais-Brionnais (71), Pays « Entre Cluny et Tournus » (71), Pays de Montbéliard (25), Pays du Revermont (Poligny, Arbois, Salins : 39).

=== Brittany ===
- Towns of Art and of History : Dinan (22), Dinard (35), Concarneau (29), Fougères (35), Lorient (56), Morlaix (29), Vannes (56), Vitré (35), Brest (29)).

- Land of Art and of History : Pays de Morlaix (22), Pays de Quimperlé (22).

- Metropolis of Art and of History: Rennes (35).

- Towns of Art in which assent has been withdrawn : Auray (56), Saint-Malo (35).

=== Centre-Val de Loire ===
- Towns of Art and of History : Orléans (45), Tours (37), Blois (41), Vendôme (41), Bourges (18), Chinon (37), Loches (37).

- Land of Art and of History : Pays Loire Touraine (37), Pays Loire Val d'Aubois, Pays de la vallée du Cher et du Romorantinais (41).

=== Corsica ===
- Towns of Art and of History : Ajaccio (2A), Bastia (2B), Sartène (2A), Bonifacio (2A)).

=== Grand-Est ===
- Towns of Art and of History: Mulhouse (68), Strasbourg (67), Sedan (08), Châlons-en-Champagne (51), Bar-le-Duc (55), Metz (57), Langres (52), Reims (51), Troyes (10), Charleville-Mézières (08), Lunéville (54).

- Land of Art and of History : Pays du Val d'Argent, Pays de Guebwiller (68), Pays d’Épinal, Cœur des Vosges (88).

=== Guadeloupe ===
- Towns of Art and of History : Basse-Terre, Pointe-à-Pitre.

=== French Guiana ===
- Towns of Art and of History : Saint-Laurent-du-Maroni.

- Land of Art and of History : Pays des estuaires Maroni-Mana (including Awala-Yalimapo and Suriname : resort de Galibi).

=== Hauts-de-France ===
- Towns of Art and of History : Roubaix (59), Boulogne-sur-Mer (62), Cambrai (59), Lille (59), Tourcoing (59), Chantilly (60), Beauvais (60), Laon (02), Noyon (60), Saint-Quentin (02), Soissons (02).

- Land of Art and of History : Pays de Lens-Liévin, Pays de Saint-Omer et de la Morinie (62).

- Metropolis of Art and of History: Amiens (80).

=== Île-de-France ===
- Towns of Art and of History : Boulogne-Billancourt (92), Étampes (91), Meaux (77), Noisiel (77), Pontoise (95), Rambouillet (78), Vincennes (Val-de-Marne), Communauté d'Agglomération de Saint-Quentin-en-Yvelines (78), Plaine Commune (93).

- Land of Art and of History : Pays de l’Etampois – Sud Essonne (91), Parc naturel régional du Vexin français.

=== Martinique ===
- Towns of Art and of History : Saint-Pierre.

=== Normandy ===
- Towns of Art and of History : Caen (14), Dieppe (76), Fécamp (76), Le Havre (76), Bernay (27).

- Land of Art and of History : Pays d'Auge (14 & 61), Pays du Clos du Cotentin & Valognes (50), Pays de Coutances (50), Rouen-Elbeuf-Austreberthe (76).

=== Nouvelle-Aquitaine ===
- Towns of Art and of History : Bergerac (24), Bordeaux (33), Périgueux (24), Sarlat (24), Pau (64), Bayonne (64), Dax (40), La Réole (33), Limoges (87), Cognac (16), Poitiers (86), Rochefort (17), Royan (17), Saintes (17), Thouars (79).

- Land of Art and of History : Pays du Béarn des Gaves (64), Pays du Grand Villeneuvois (47), Pays des Pyrénées béarnaises (64), Pays des Hautes terres corréziennes et Ventadour (19), Pays Vézère et Ardoise (19), Pays des Monts et Barrages (87), Île de Ré (17), Pays du Confolentais (16), Pays de l’Angoumois (16), Pays Châtelleraudais (86), Pays Mellois (79), Pays Montmorillonnais (86), Pays de Parthenay (79).

=== Occitania ===
- Towns of Art and of History : Millau (12), Cahors (46), Figeac (46), Montauban (82), Moissac (82), Toulouse (31), Beaucaire (30), Lodève (34), Narbonne (11), Nîmes (30), Perpignan (66), Uzès (30).

- Land of Art and of History : Pays des Bastides du Rouergue (Najac, Sauveterre-de-Rouergue, Villefranche-de-Rouergue, Villeneuve d'Aveyron) (12), Pays de la Vallée de la Dordogne (46), Pays des Pyrénées cathares (Canton de Mirepoix, Canton de Lavelanet) (09), Pays du Grand Auch (32), Pays des Vallées d'Aure et du Louron (31), Grand Rodez (12), Pays de Mende et Lot-en-Gévaudan (48), Pays de Pézenas (34), Pays de la Vallée de la Têt (66), Pays transfrontalier des Vallées du Tech et du Ter ((66)), Pays du Haut Languedoc et Vignobles (34).

- Metropolis of Art and of History: Montpellier Méditerranée Métropole (34).

=== Pays de la Loire ===
- Towns of Art and of History : Guérande (44), Nantes (44), Angers (49), Fontenay-le-Comte (85), Laval (53), Le Mans (72), Saumur (49), Clisson (44), Saint-Nazaire (44).

- Land of Art and of History : Pays du Perche sarthois (72), Pays Coëvrons-Mayenne (53), Pays de la Vallée du Loir (72), Pays du Vignoble nantais (44).

=== Provence-Alpes-Côte d'Azur ===
- Towns of Art and of History : Arles (13), Briançon (05), Fréjus (83), Grasse (06), Hyères (83), Martigues (13), Menton (06), Nice (06).

- Land of Art and of History : Pays de Carpentras et du Comtat Venaissin (84), Pays S.U.D. Serre-Ponçon Ubaye Durance (04 and 05), Pays de la Provence Verte (83), Pays des Vallées Roya-Bévéra (06).

=== Réunion ===
- Towns of Art and of History : Saint-Denis, Saint-Pierre.

- Land of Art and of History : Les portes du Sud.

== See also ==
- Les Plus Beaux Villages de France
