= Ancient Baths of Alauna =

Gallo-Roman thermal complex in Valognes

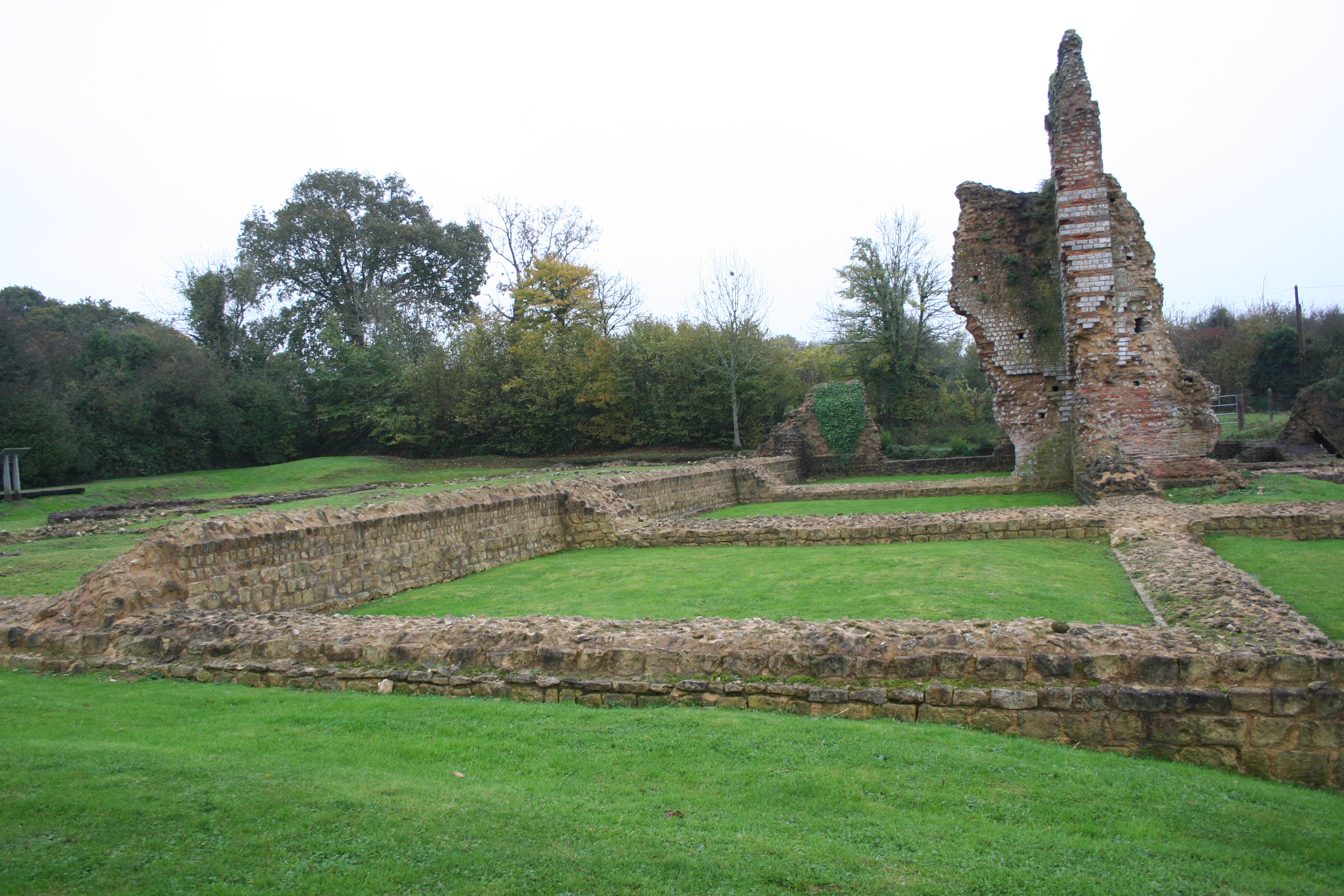
- View of remains from the north.

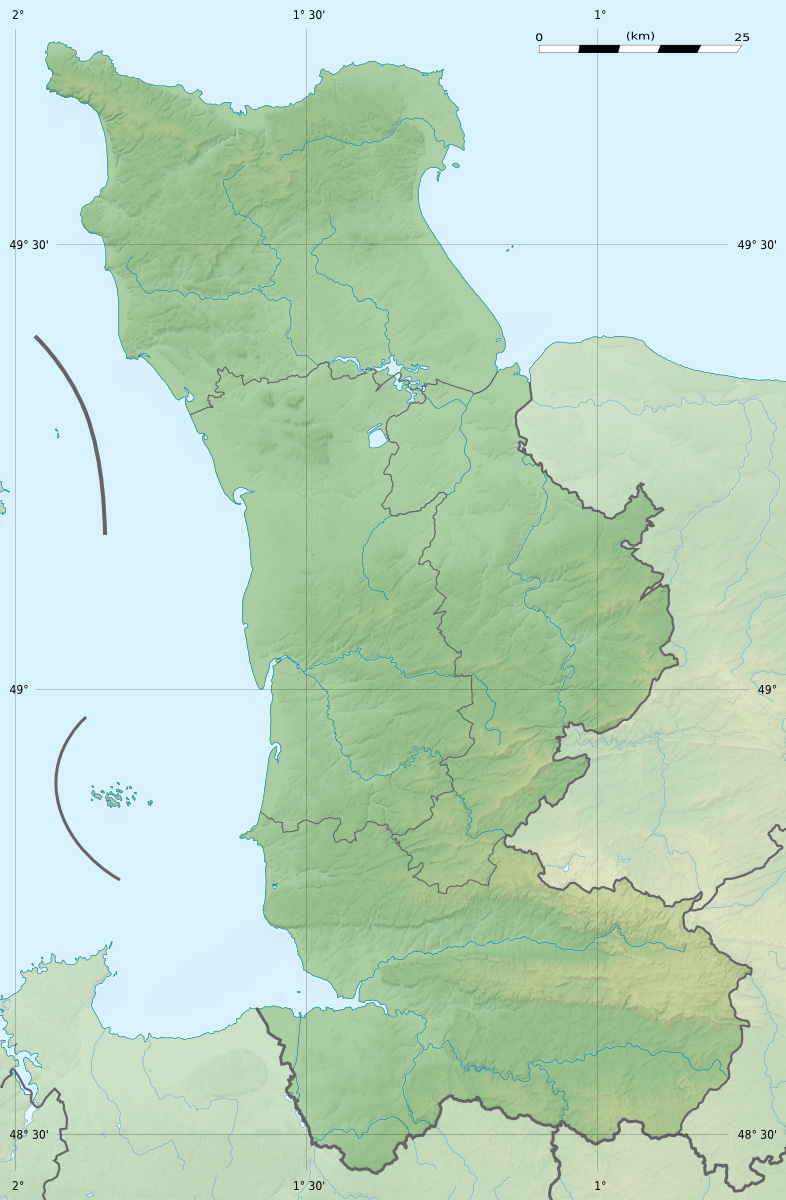
- 49°30′26″N 1°27′19″W
- Type: Roman baths
- Location: Manche, France
- Region: Normandy

Site notes
- Elevation: 38 m (125 ft)
- Condition: Protected as Historical monument (1862)

The ancient baths of Alauna are a Gallo-Roman thermal complex located in the French commune of Valognes in the north of Manche.

North of the ancient city of Alauna, now covered by pastures and hedgerows of the Norman bocage in the 21st century, the baths are situated near a road considered the cardo maximus. It is believed that they were constructed in the latter part of the first century and fell out of use two centuries later. The masonry of the baths was repurposed over time, but the site saw some reinvestment towards the end of the Middle Ages. The baths of Alauna exhibit a symmetrical architecture, featuring identical rooms on both sides of an axis, placing them in the category of baths with a symmetrical plan, similar to the Baths of Nero, albeit on a smaller scale (1,225 m^{2}).

The remains, still partially standing at about twelve meters, have been a part of the landscape since antiquity. In the late 17th century, they were officially recognized as the ruins of an ancient thermal establishment. The site was completely excavated in the early 1990s, and its plan was fully restored before being developed into an archaeological garden. Recent studies are uncovering probable annex buildings near the complex.

The baths of Alauna have been protected as a historical monument since 1862.

== Geography and archaeological context ==
=== The baths in the contemporary landscape ===
Alauna relief map.

Alauna is situated 1.6 km southeast of the modern town of Alleaume (commune of Valognes, Manche department). It is on the northwest edge of a plateau between two parallel thalwegs running northwest, which border it to the east and west. The thermal complex is situated at the eastern end of Rue du Balnéaire, outside the main built-up area of Alleaume and to the southeast of the settlement. It is located on the slope of the left bank of the Merderet valley, with the towns of Valognes and Alleaume on the opposite side of the river.

The depression through which the Merderet River flows is partially filled with Hettangian deposits (Early Jurassic) as a result of a marine transgression that encroached upon the western edge of the Paris Basin. Local geological materials such as red clays, sands, gravel, and Rhaetian pebbles (Late Triassic) from the plateau, as well as Jurassic limestone from the slopes, are utilized in the construction of buildings in Alauna, including the baths.

=== The baths within Alauna ===
Alauna's hypothetical plan.

The baths are situated near the northwest boundary of the ancient city of Alauna. While most of the Alauna site is at an altitude above 50 m, reaching up to 60 m near the ancient theatre, the other part follows the slope of the valley on slopes descending towards the Merderet River, sometimes reaching a 10% gradient. The baths are constructed almost at the base of the plateau, at an altitude of 38 m, occupying the lowest point of the ancient city. It appears that the main road running through Alauna from south to north (cardo maximus) served the baths before continuing north towards the Cotentin Peninsula to Fermanville and/or Cherbourg.

The baths and spectacles in the eastern part of the ancient city are the known monumental structures discovered through excavations. Additionally, a forum in the center and several sanctuaries are confirmed to have existed. The central area of the city was densely populated, with craftwork being prominent on the outskirts. Recent findings indicate that Alauna was a larger city than previously believed, potentially housing a population of 3,000 to 4,000 residents. The presence of a small thermal establishment north of the city raises questions about the existence of a larger complex, possibly located at the northeast corner of the cardo maximus and decumanus maximus. Excavations in 1695 and 1981 (revealed evidence of tubuli and a tiled floor, suggesting the presence of a balneum, either private or public) in that area.

== History ==
=== The site in Antiquity and the Middle Ages ===
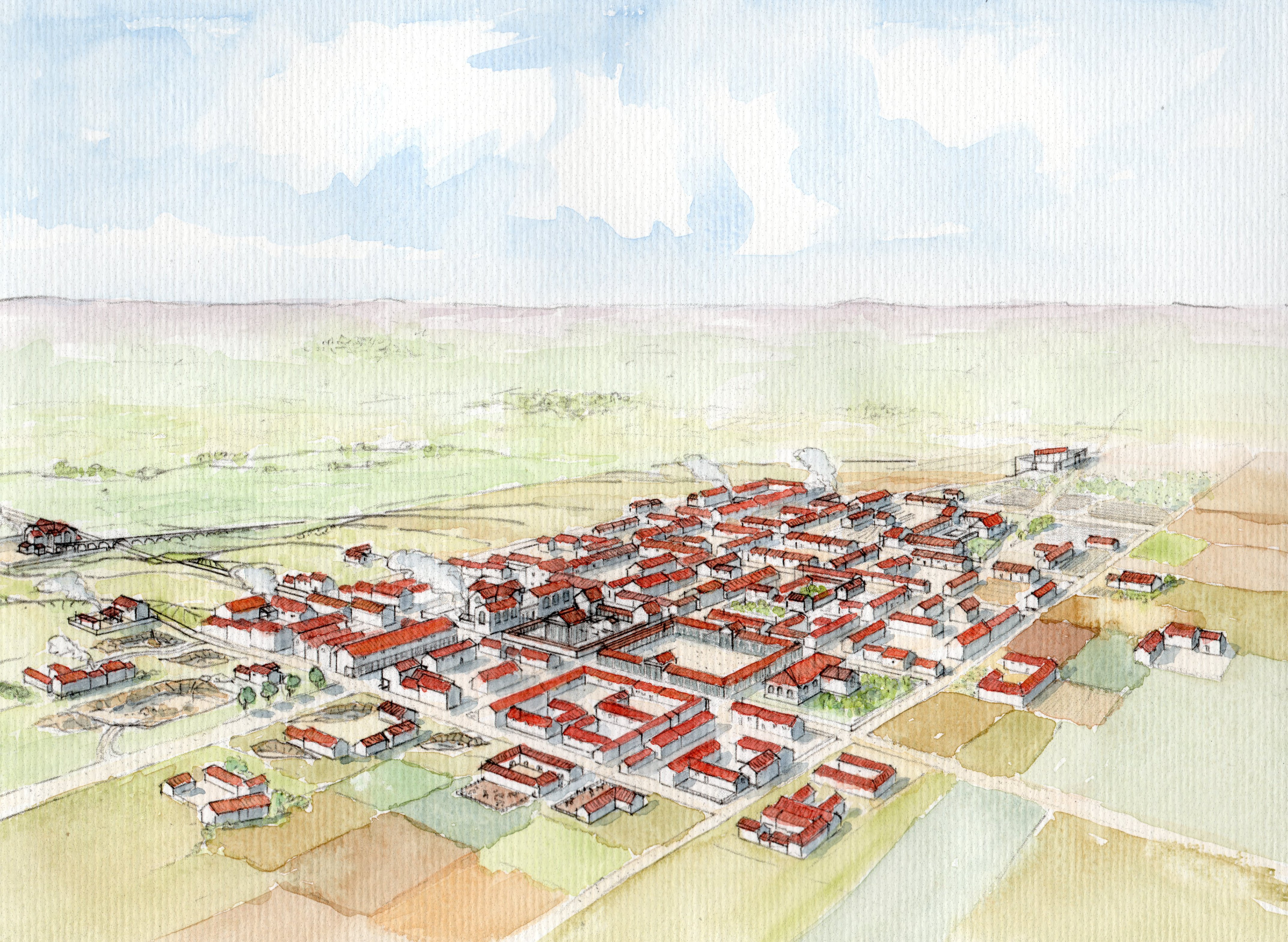
Evocation of Alauna in the 2nd century, with the thermal baths on the far left.

The baths are situated on a plot that was originally surrounded by ditches, which were partially filled in for the construction. On the site, a brick kiln, a well, and another masonry structure of unknown purpose were found. These findings are believed to date back to the early Roman period and may be associated with the construction of the baths. There is no evidence of prior occupation on the site.

The construction of the baths in Alauna likely took place in the second half of the 1st century, around 60 to 80 AD, during the city's development and expansion phase when its main monuments were being built. This early construction period aligns with the broader trend of bath development in Gaul during the early Antonine dynasty (98-192 AD). Unlike other thermal establishments, the Alauna complex did not undergo significant modifications over time. Latrines were added against the western wall near the water inlet, and an external pool may have been attached to the same room, but the exact dates of these additions are unknown. By the end of the 3rd century, the baths fell into disuse, and their masonry was gradually dismantled and repurposed in new constructions over the following centuries, reflecting the overall decline of the city of Alauna during that period.

The site remained inactive until the end of the Middle Ages when a hamlet was built there. Some of its buildings were supported by the westernmost walls of the baths, while the recovery of stones continued on the rest of the structure, up to the extraction of the foundation blocks. These demolition materials were reused on-site for new constructions. This phase of "differentiated reuse" explains the distribution of the preserved remains in elevation in modern times, protected from destruction by their inclusion in other buildings that were later destroyed.

=== Historical mentions and contemporary studies ===
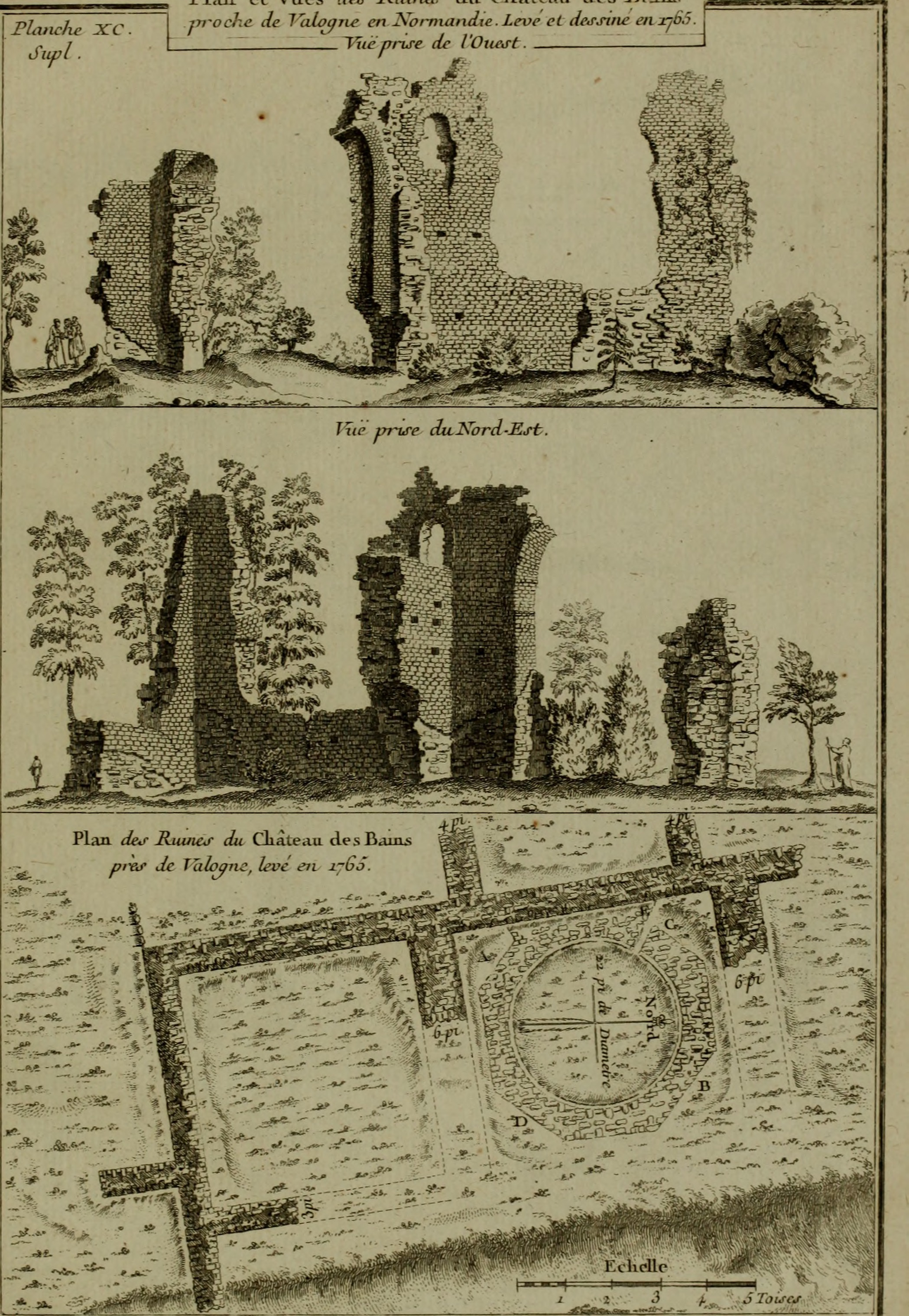
The thermal baths (drawings by René Cevet).

In 1688, Louis Le Vavasseur de Masseville reported the tradition of an ancient city at the site of Alleaume, mentioning the "old castle of Vallongnes," sometimes attributed to Clovis. (Note: Due to their sturdy construction and numerous rooms, Roman baths were often mistaken for ancient "palaces" or medieval "fortresses" in past centuries before being correctly identified.) In 1695, Nicolas-Joseph Foucault, the intendant of the generalité of Caen, commissioned excavations at the site. The Jesuit Pierre-Joseph Dunod, who supervised the works, identified the ruins as an ancient bathhouse, not a castle. However, a plan published by Bernard de Montfaucon in 1722 erroneously depicts the baths of Vieux-la-Romaine instead. Despite a correction by de Montfaucon, some authors, including Jean-Louis Adam in 1905, adopted the incorrect plan. It was not until 1953 that Albert Grenier highlighted the importance of this correction, which had previously gone unnoticed. (Note: This clarification by Albert Grenier, though perhaps imprecise and clumsy in its form, sparked reactions from local scholars who mistakenly believed Grenier was questioning the existence of baths in Valognes. Grenier clarified that he meant "the baths, as depicted on Montfaucon's plan, do not exist in Valognes.")

In the seventh volume of his Collection of Egyptian, Etruscan, Greek, Roman, and Gallic Antiquities, Anne Claude de Caylus published accurate drawings and partial plans of the baths in 1765, created by the engineer René Cevet. In 1772 and 1773, the owner of the baths' plot began demolishing the ruins using explosives and artillery. Only the walls that were still in good condition resisted and were mostly preserved, while other parts of the structure (such as floors, hypocausts of the heated rooms, and poorly preserved walls) were destroyed.

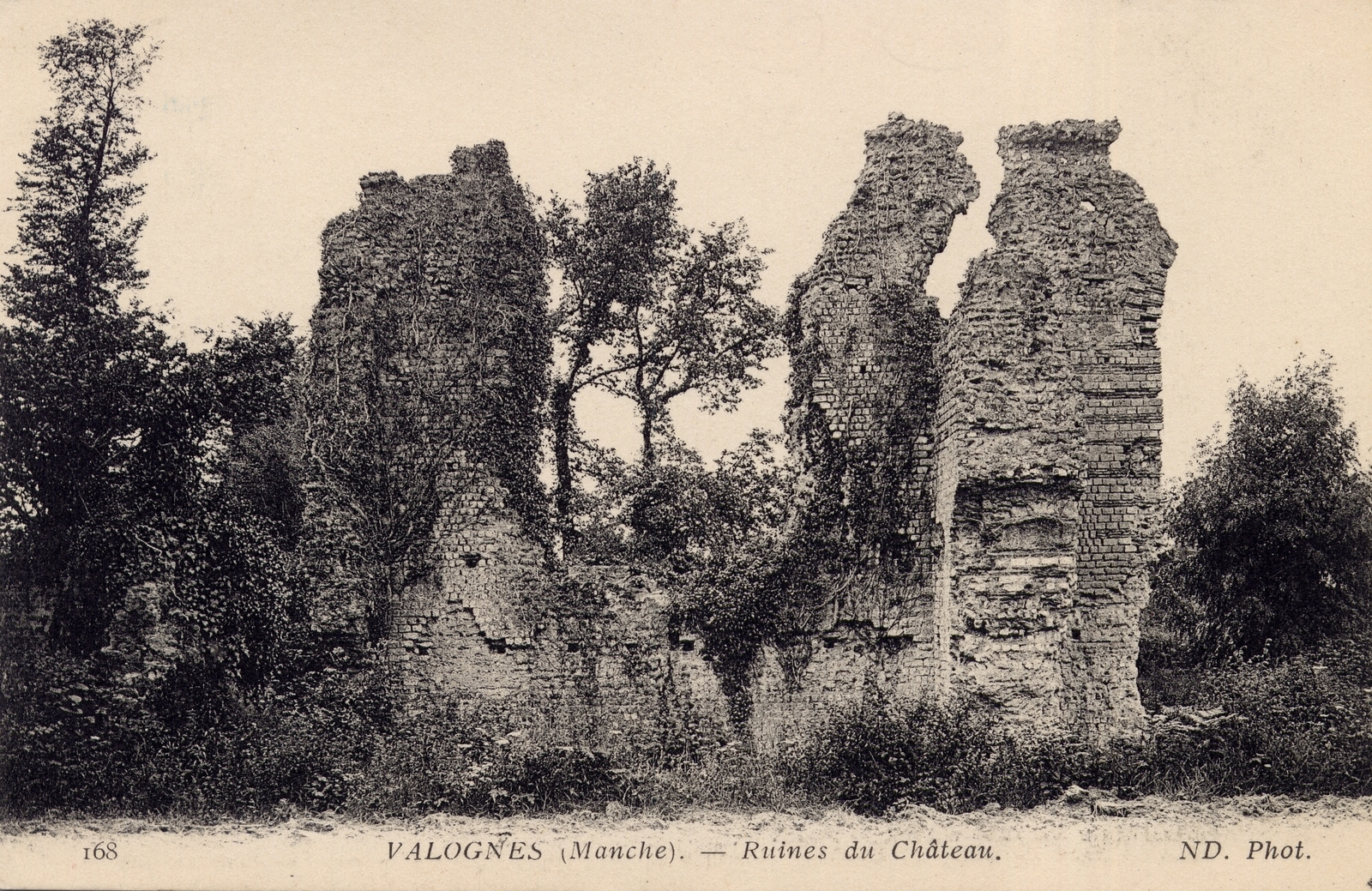
The "Château" (c. 1900).

In the 19th century, the ruins no longer reminded many residents of ancient Roman baths; only the name Vieux-Château (Old Castle) remained. Charles de Gerville resumed excavations in the early 1840s and documented the destruction from the previous century by comparing his findings to old plans. He discovered traces of the aqueduct that supplied the baths. The Normandy Antiquarian Society continued Gerville's work at Alleaume in 1845 but was unable to access the baths due to the landowner's restrictions. The remains of the thermal establishment have been safeguarded as historical monuments since their classification in 1862.

The baths, along with the entire archaeological site, were spared from the intensive bombings that devastated Valognes in June 1944 during the Normandy campaign. It was not until 1954 to 1968 that new surveys were carried out on the monument, and the remains were then stabilized. Between 1989 and 1992, at the request of the municipality of Valognes to prepare for the site's enhancement, the baths underwent complete excavation, their layout was finalized, and their timeline was clarified.

In 2020, as part of the multi-year and multidisciplinary study program of Alauna initiated in 2012 under the coordination of the National Centre for Scientific Research, the University of Caen-Normandy, and the French National Institute for Preventive Archaeological Research, the immediate environment of the baths underwent ground-penetrating radar exploration.

=== Remains and enhancement ===
The visible remnants, reaching up to 12 metres in height, belong to three rooms situated in the southwest of the building: a tepidarium, an unctorium, and a sudatorium. Additionally, the base of several other walls and the traces of trenches dug to uncover their foundations enable the reconstruction of the layout of the complex. The baths of Alauna, together with the ancient theatre of Lillebonne, are the sole Roman-era structures in Normandy that have been preserved in elevation.

In the 21st century, the restored baths site has been transformed into an archaeological garden that is open to the public. It serves as the starting point for guided tours organized by the Agglomération antique d'Alauna (Ancient Agglomeration of Alauna Association or AAA) in partnership with the Clos du Cotentin Art and History Region, especially during the European Heritage Days.

== Description ==
Plan of the baths in their original state. warm room lukewarm room cold room

=== The actus quadratus ===
The baths cover an area of 1,225 m^{2} and are located within a square measuring 36.5 m on each side, corresponding precisely to an actus quadratus (120 Roman feet on each side). This area is divided into three modules from north to south and four modules from east to west. The estimated height of the baths is 12 m, which is one-third of an actus. The tallest remaining structures measure 12 m, indicating the maximum height of the baths. The width of the outer walls of the thermal complex is also determined by this principle, measuring 1.20 m, equivalent to 4 Roman feet, or one-thirtieth of an actus.

=== Symmetrical plan baths ===
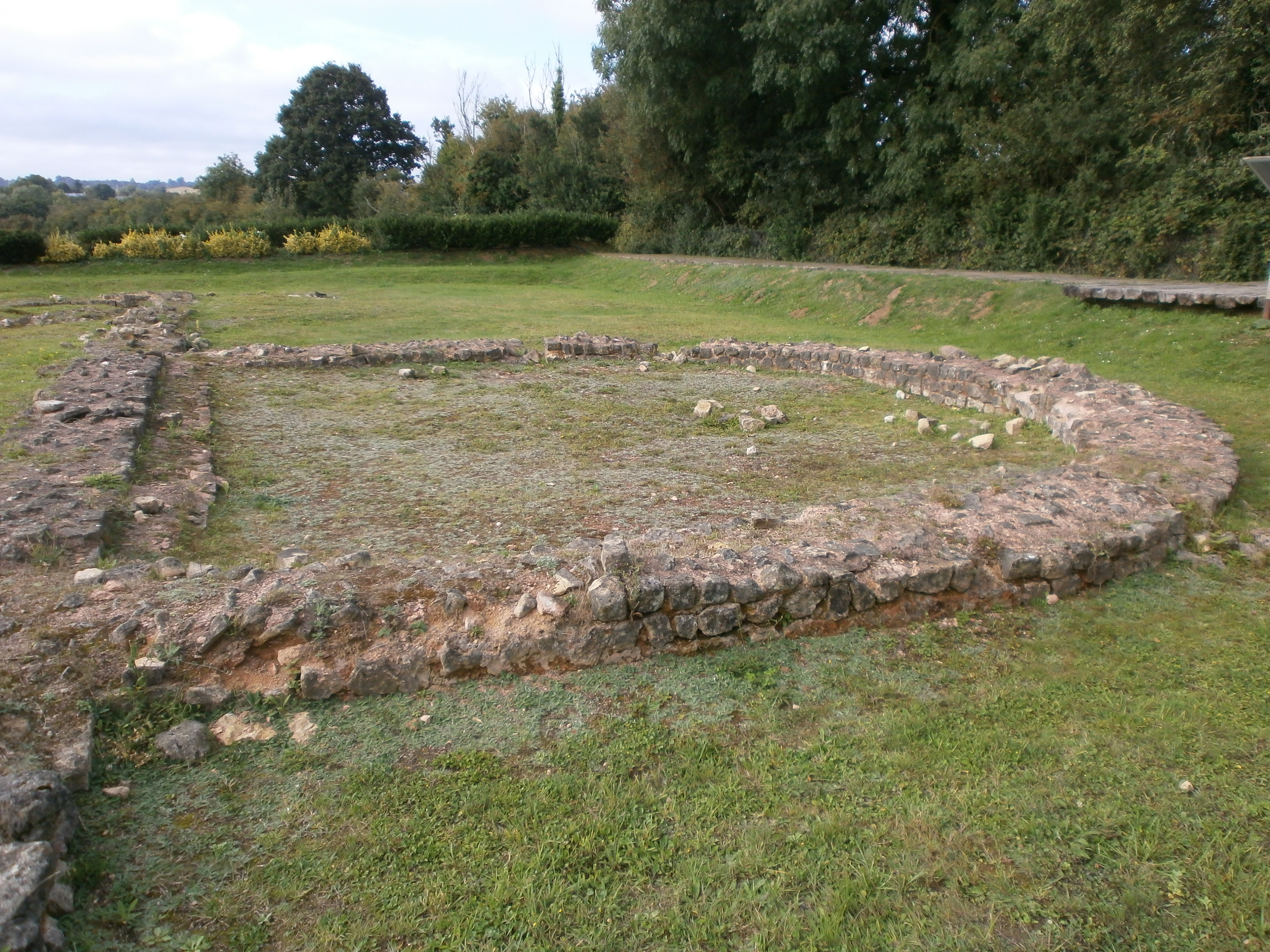
Frigidarium pool.

The rooms are symmetrically arranged around a central axis, starting from the east with a cold plunge pool in the apse, a frigidarium, a caldarium featuring an octagonal hot pool measuring 7.30 meters wide and 1 meter deep, and a sudatorium. Flanking this axis are identical rooms: apodyterium (changing room), unctorium (treatment room), and tepidarium. This layout follows the pattern of "symmetrical plan baths," a design concept first seen in the Baths of Nero constructed in Rome between 62 and 64 AD, which aligns with the presumed construction date of the baths of Alauna. Visitors access and exit the facility through the two apodyteria located on the eastern side of the complex, facing the nearby road.

The decision to replicate specific rooms likely serves the purpose of adjusting the bath's capacity based on usage rather than segregating men and women, who will ultimately convene at the pools and sudatorium, shared spaces. Additionally, this approach enables the maintenance of a portion of the complex, a project that may span several months without entirely disrupting its operation.

=== Optimized architecture ===
==== Natural topography exploited to the full ====
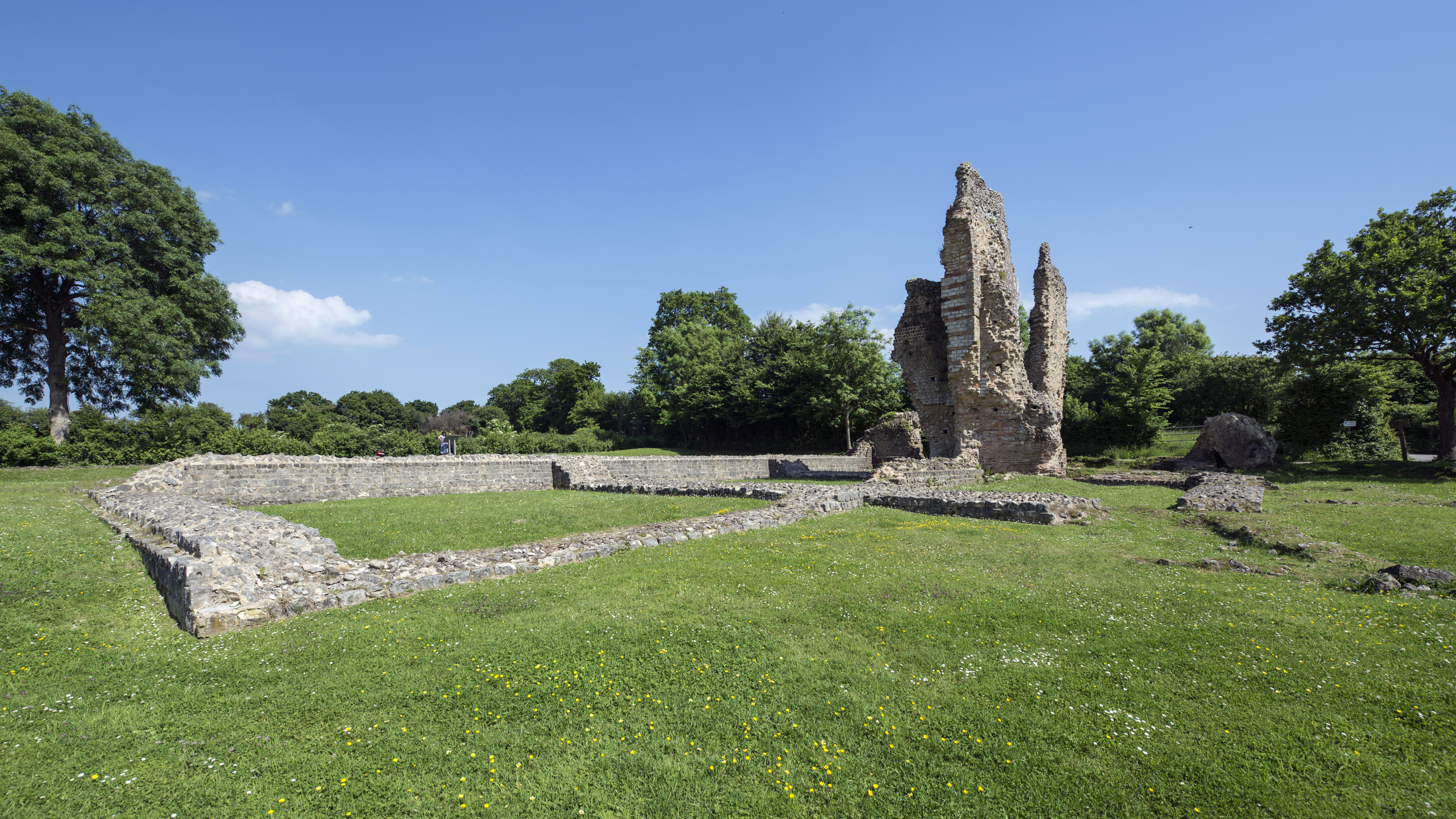
Overview of the site.

There is an area designated for service and maintenance activities to the west of the baths. This area supplies the praefurnia with firewood, which can be stored on-site. High openings in the walls provide access to the roofs of the baths, with one of these passages visible in drawings by René Cevet but later bricked up. Additionally, this zone has the lowest natural ground level, allowing the builders to take advantage of the natural slope to install the hot rooms. This design choice eliminates the need for extensive excavations to create the 1.25 m high service basement required for the proper functioning of these rooms (ovens and hypocausts for underfloor heating). (Note: The east-west orientation of the Alauna baths, dictated by the site's topography, deviates from the typical layout of baths with symmetrical plans. These baths are usually oriented north-south, with the hot rooms positioned to the south to maximize sunlight.)

All rooms in the complex are interconnected, except for the caldarium and frigidarium, to prevent heat loss. The heating system of the complex is maintained by three praefurnia connected to the sudatorium. The furnaces distribute heat to the sudatorium, caldarium, and its pool through the hypocaust system and heat outlets that link these underground spaces. Hot air from the hypocausts is expelled through terracotta tubuli embedded in the walls.

==== Simple construction ====
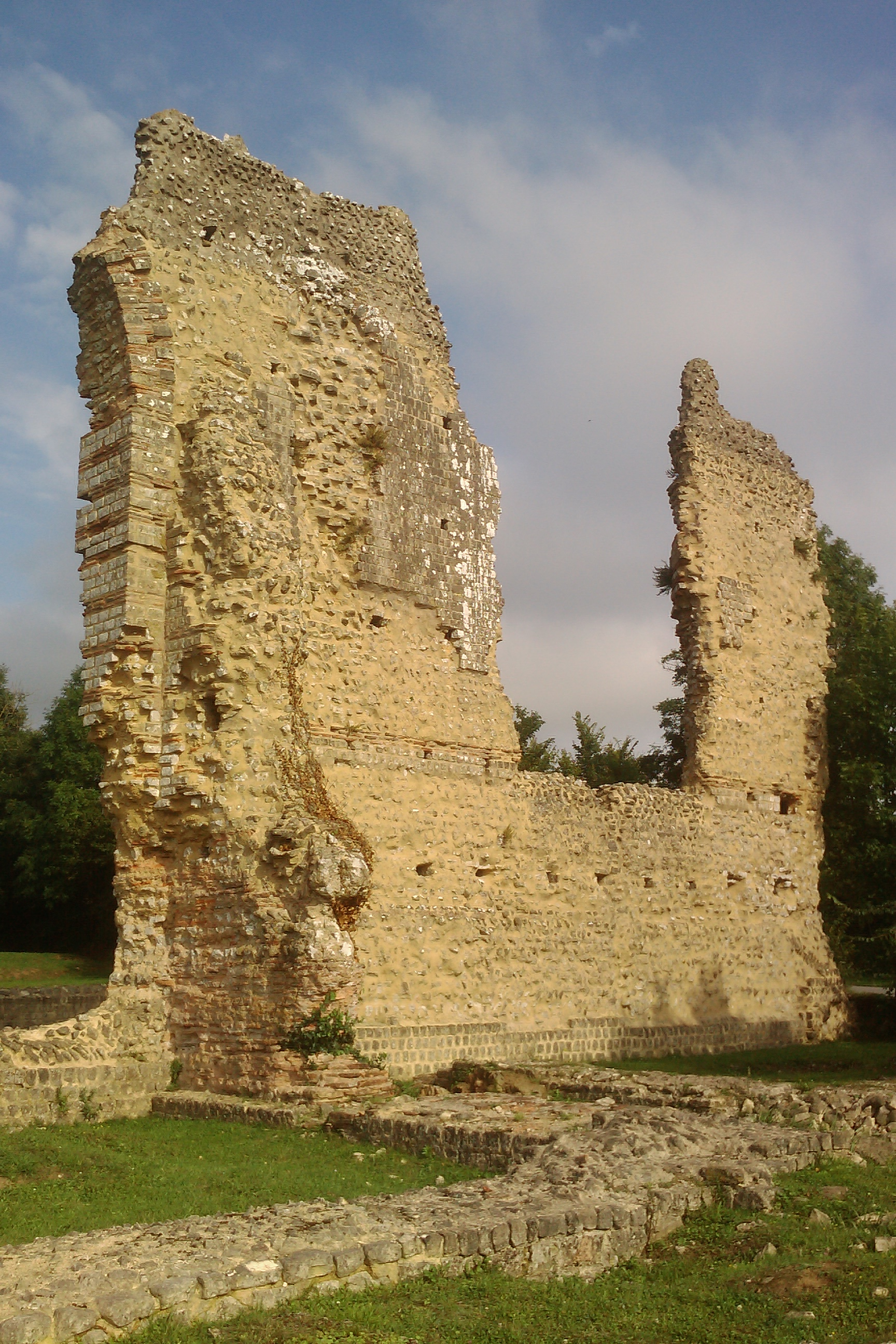
Tiles and rubble in a bay frame.

The walls are thick, with the caldarium walls reaching around 2 meters, likely for thermal insulation and roof support. They are constructed using rubble masonry, sandwiched between two claddings of small regular blocks (opus vittatum) of limestone rubble (12 × 12 cm), with corner reinforcements made of larger rubble of the same nature. Ceramic building material (CBM) is incorporated in the arches of openings, doors, and windows to ensure strength and enhance aesthetics. In the lower parts of the sudatorium, CBM is used alone due to its refractory qualities, in contact with the praefurnia and forming the mass of the hot pool. (Note: Follain 2007, pp. 8 and 16) The absence of CBM in alternating layers with the rubble in the facing of the walls (opus mixtum) suggests the baths were constructed before the 2nd century, a time when this architectural feature was becoming more common.

The outer walls do not appear to have been coated with plaster, relying on the alternation of stones and bricks for decoration, along with protrusions and recesses creating depth and shadow effects. The interior decoration of the rooms, likely richer with painted plaster or veneers as is often the case, remains unknown, with any usable traces having disappeared, except for limestone slabs covering the floor and walls of the cold pool. These slabs possibly cover a tile mortar for waterproofing the cold pool. The hot pool may have had a similar waterproofing treatment, as witnesses described a "basin in reddish stucco" according to de Gerville.

==== Roof hypotheses ====
The construction of the bath's roof and its integration into the walls is still a topic of debate due to the lack of remaining evidence. The heated rooms, including the sudatorium, caldarium, and tepidaria, are covered with masonry vaults designed to retain heat and moisture. These vaults appear to be supported by an internal recess in the walls, although the existence of a framework and roof above them is uncertain. The cold pool, distinguished by its apse-shaped design, is probably covered by a semi-dome vault.

It seems that the peripheral walls of the baths are higher than the roof insertion level, concealing it. This explains the need for high passages in the walls for maintenance, with the roof essentially being "embedded" in the building. Other reconstructions propose a more traditional method of inserting the roof onto the building's walls.

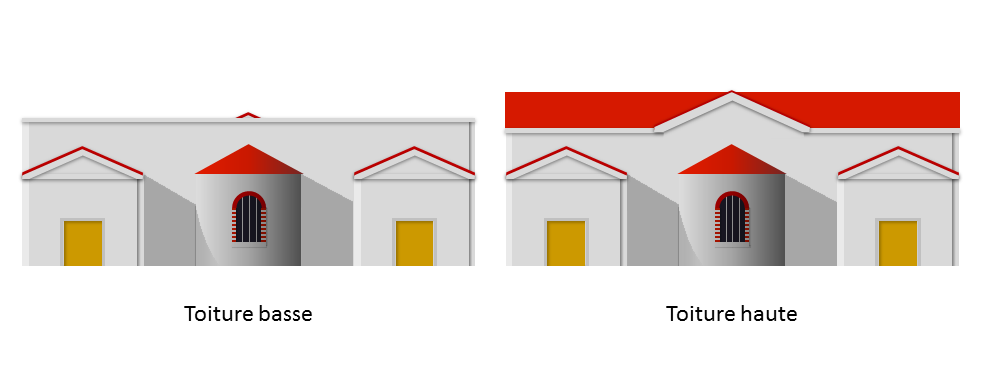
Hypotheses for the restoration of the roof (view of the eastern facade).

=== Water supply and drainage ===
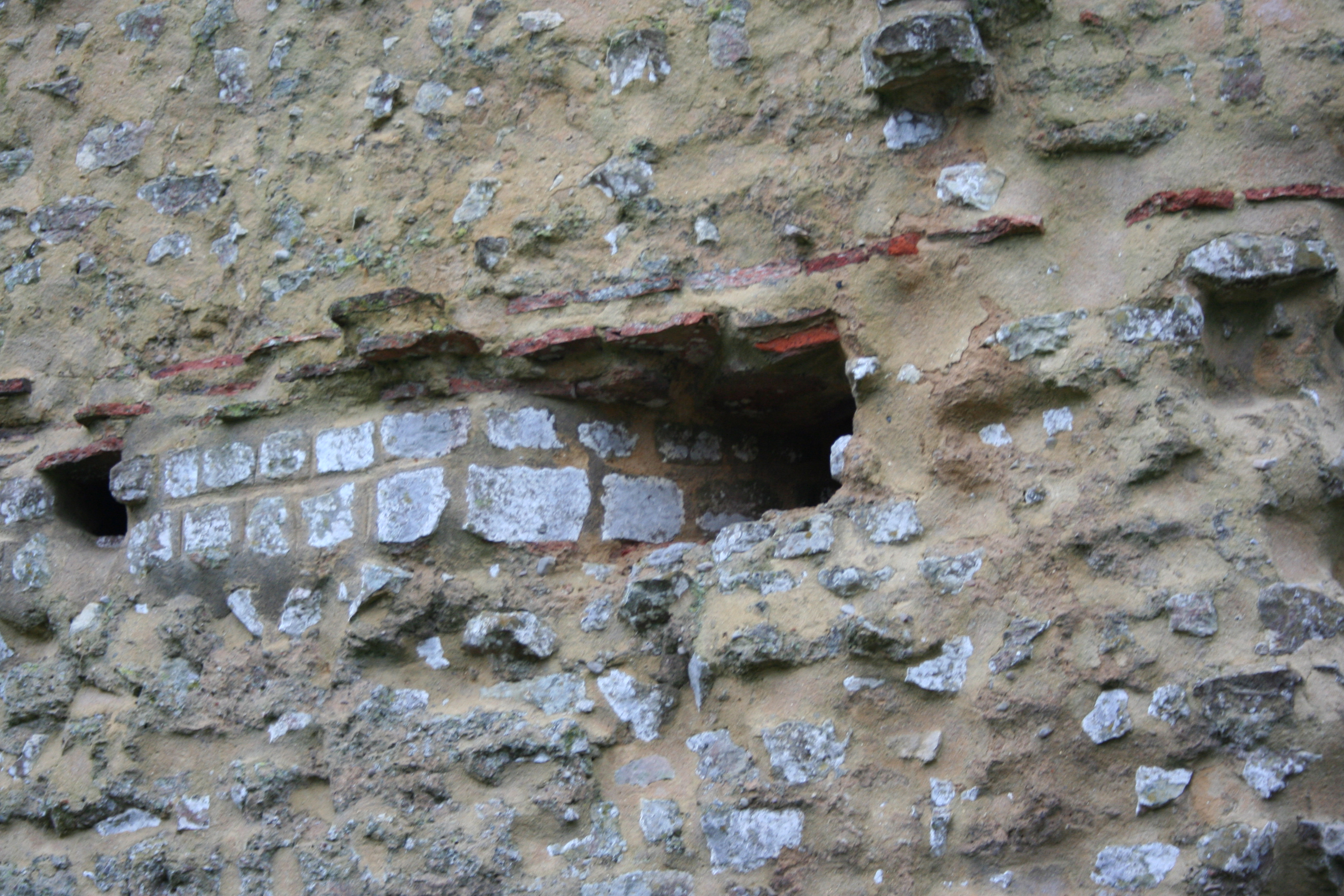
Completion of the aqueduct in the spa wall.

The Fontaine du Bus or Fontaine du Bû is a spring located near the theater to the east of the site at an altitude of 57 meters. In the 21st century, it is used as a water source for the town. Historical excavations reveal that the spring supplies water to the baths through a system of artificial regulation and a retention pond, followed by an 800-meter-long aqueduct with a 19-meter drop. The aqueduct is mostly underground, except for a section near the baths where it is above ground. Although remnants of this aqueduct were identified in the 17th century (manholes, a 40 cm-wide, tile-covered section of conduit), recent research in the 21st century has not found any traces of it. The aqueduct terminates in the southern wall of the tepidarium, where it transitions into a groove along the wall and enters the baths through the sudatorium. It is believed that at this point, the water was carried through a lead pipe supported by masonry pillars or wooden posts.

In the northern part of the settlement, an area served by the Alauna roads but sparsely built, a ground-penetrating radar survey in 2020 revealed "anomalies" that could correspond to channels, tubular or covered trench pipelines, as well as tanks or reservoirs. It is currently premature to assign a role to these features in the water supply of the city in general and the baths in particular. If these anomalies do indicate the presence of the water supply system in Alauna, the absence of constructions in this sector could be due to a prohibition on building too close to the aqueduct to preserve the quality of its water. (Note: The creation of a protective perimeter is a regulatory requirement, as demonstrated by two boundary markers located near the Gier aqueduct in the Rhône region. These markers replicate the text of a decree issued by Hadrian.) It may also be "developed land" in anticipation of urban expansion that was never realized.

A gutter for draining water from the cold pool downhill towards the Merderet is located north of the thermal complex. It likely also collects water from the roof, as it surrounds the wall of the apse externally. The drainage system of the hot pool, which included a channel directed outside the building, was discovered in 1695 and is depicted on historical plans. Unfortunately, it was destroyed in the 18th century along with the pool.

=== Envisaged annexed structures ===
A 2020 survey partially uncovered a structure northeast of the thermal establishment, covering an area of approximately 1,200 m². This structure seems to consist of a courtyard surrounded by a peristyle, possibly the palaestra, a feature commonly found near baths but not previously identified in Alauna. Situated between the baths and the cardo maximus, a partitioned building may be associated with the thermal complex, housing rooms with various functions such as a gymnasium. However, it differs from the baths and could potentially be a mansio located at the northern entrance of the city, not aligned with the baths but with the road.

For functional reasons, the palaestra and gymnasium are typically situated near the entrance of the baths.

== Notes and references ==
=== References ===
- "L'étude novatrice d'un vestige antique, les thermes d'Alauna". Archéologia (in French). April 2005.
- "Les thermes gallo-romains de Valognes". Patrimoine Normand (in French). 2005.
- "Thermes d'Alauna : guide de visite". Ville de Valognes (in French). 2007.
- "Valognes (Manche - 50) « Alauna » - L'agglomération antique d'Alleaume - Prospection thématique 2012". Manche General Council (in French). 2012.
- Other references

== Further information ==
=== Bibliography ===
- Bedon, Robert; Pinon, Pierre; Chevallier, Raymond (1988). Architecture et urbanisme en Gaule romaine : L'architecture et la ville. Les Hespérides (in French). Vol. 1. Paris: Éditions Errance. ISBN 2-903442-79-7.
- Coulon, Gérard (2006). Les Gallo-Romains. Civilisations et cultures (in French). Paris: Éditions Errance. ISBN 2-87772-331-3.
- Delalande, Arsène (1846). Rapport sur le fouilles exécutées à Valognes (in French). Vol. XIV (1844). Mémoires de la Société des antiquaires de Normandie. pp. 317–331.
- Fichet de Clairefontaine, François (2004). "Valognes/Alauna". Revue archéologique du Centre de la France.
- Follain, Éric; Lepert, Thierry (April 2005a). "L'étude novatrice d'un vestige antique, les thermes d'Alauna". Archéologia (in French) (421): 42–51.
- Follain, Éric; Lepert, Thierry (2005b). "Les thermes gallo-romains de Valognes". Patrimoine Normand (in French) (54): 14–19.
- Follain, Éric (2007). Thermes d'Alauna : guide de visite (in French). Valognes.
- de Gerville, Charles (1844). Monuments romains d'Alleaume (in French). Valognes.
- Jeanne, Laurence; Duclos, Caroline; Paez-Rezende, Laurent (2012). Valognes (Manche - 50) « Alauna » - L'agglomération antique d'Alleaume : Prospection thématique 2012 : document final de synthèse (PDF). Résultats (in French). Vol. 1. Conseil général de la Manche.
- Jeanne, Laurence; Duclos, Caroline; Paez-Rezende, Laurent (2021). Agglomération antique d'Alleaume : La Victoire/le Castelet, géoradar 7e année : rapport 2020 (in French). DRAC Normandie/Conseil général de la Manche.
- Macé, Jacques (1959). Les ruines antiques d'Alauna, près de Valognes (in French). Vol. LIV (1957-1958). Bulletin de la Société des antiquaires de Normandie. pp. 384–395.
- Malissard, Alain (2002). Les Romains et l'eau. Réalia (in French). Les Belles Lettres. ISBN 2-251-33814-4.
- Muller, Michel (2006). "Du vieux château au balnéaire, histoire des fouilles d'Alauna". Val'auna, revue historique sur Valognes et les alentours (in French) (9): 3–12.
