= 2017 Jerusalem truck attack =

Vehicle-ramming attack in Jerusalem

- Part of the Israeli–Palestinian conflict
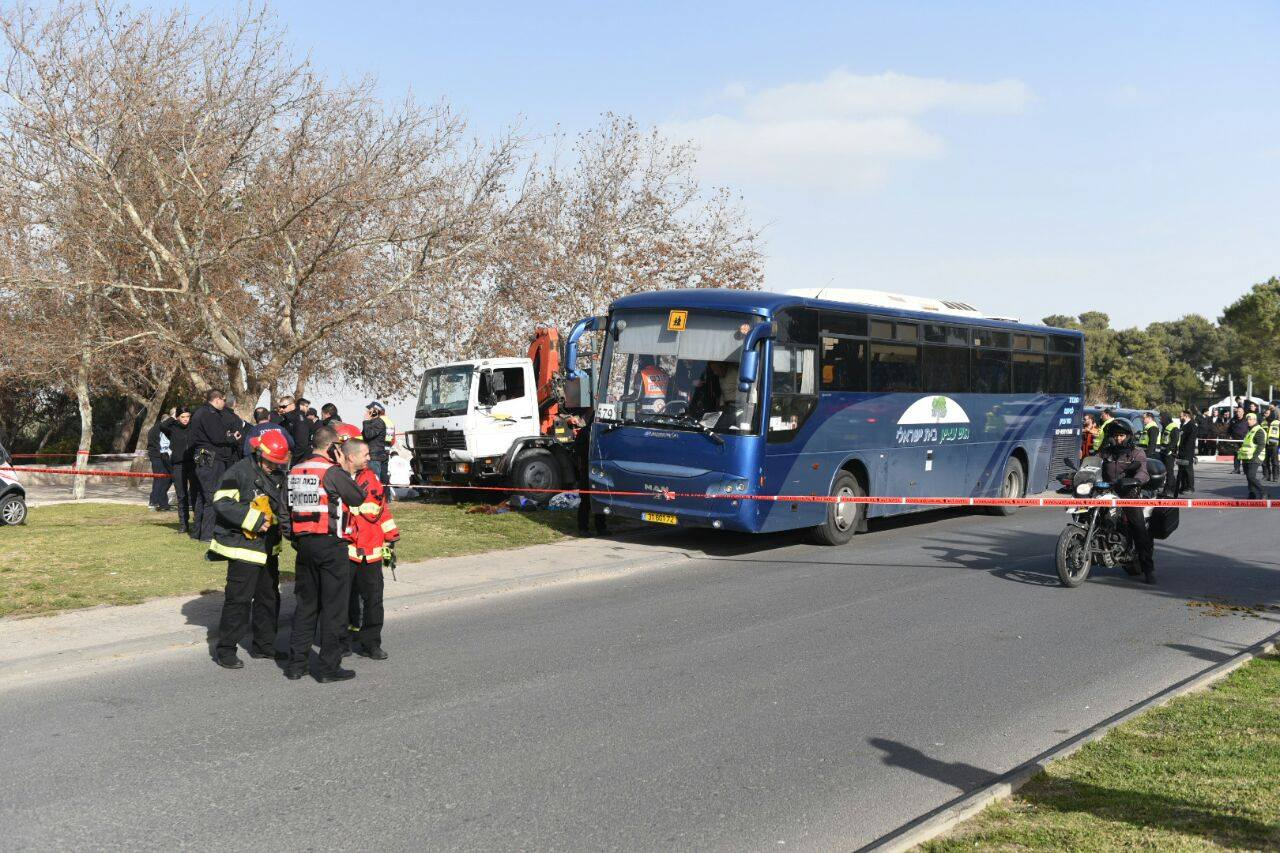
- The attack aftermath

- The attack site
- Location: 31.754414°N 35.231492°E; East Talpiot, East Jerusalem
- Date: 8 January 2017; 9 years ago 13:00 (UTC+2)
- Attack type: Vehicular assault
- Weapon: Semi-trailer truck
- Deaths: 4 (+1 attacker)
- Injuries: 17
- Assailant: Fadi al-Qanbar

A vehicle-ramming attack occurred in Jerusalem on 8 January 2017. A truck driven by an Arab citizen of Israel plowed into a group of uniformed Israel Defense Forces (IDF) soldiers disembarking from a bus on the Armon Hanatziv Promenade in Jerusalem's East Talpiot neighborhood, close to the Trotner park and UNTSO headquarters, killing four and injuring 15.

Hours after the incident, Prime Minister Benjamin Netanyahu blamed the Islamic State for the attack, raising questions about how he came to that conclusion. Opponents criticized the Israeli government for downplaying the political side. Later, the attack was claimed by an unknown Palestinian group called "The Martyr of Baha Alyan Collective", citing political motives. The attack was condemned by the United Nations, European Union, the United States and others.

== Attack ==
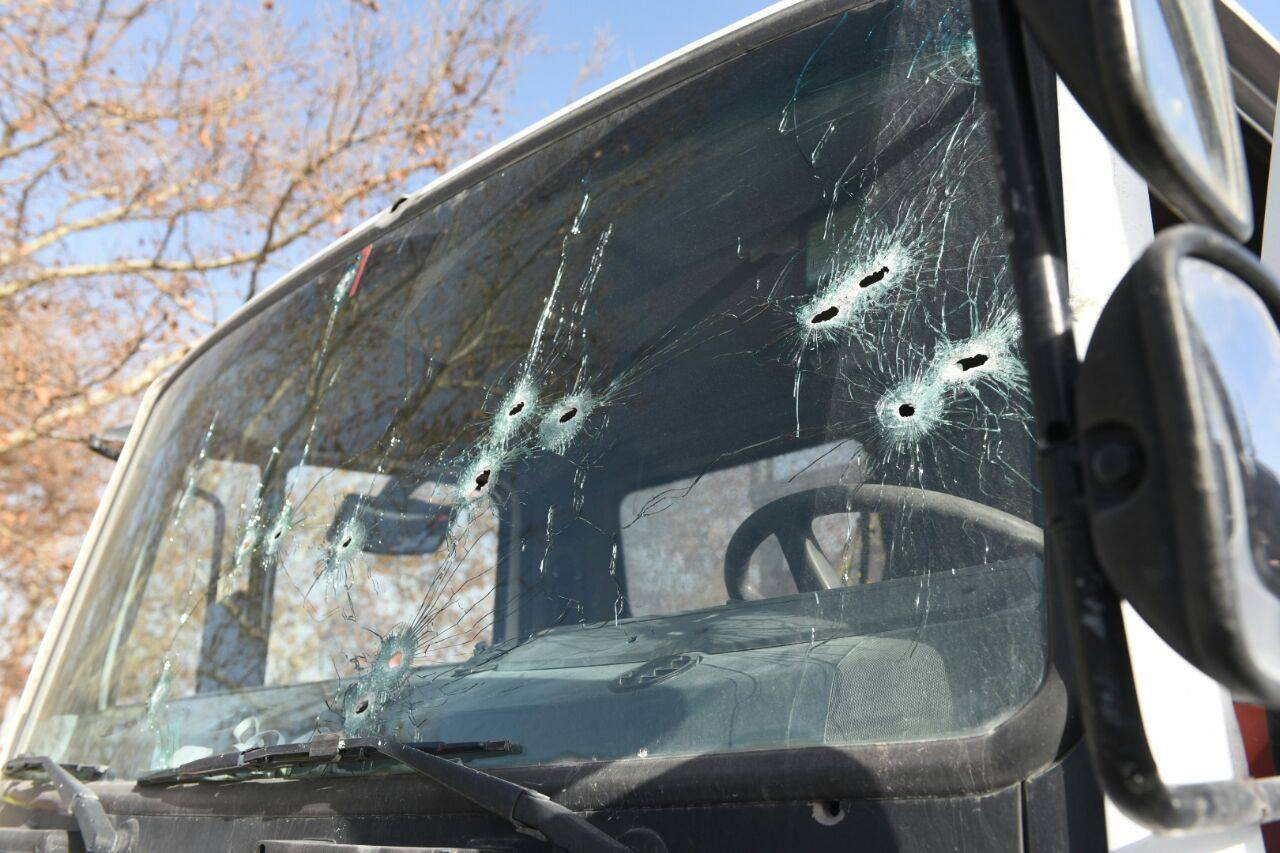
The truck involved in the attack

At around 13:00, a truck rammed into a group of IDF soldiers at a promenade in the East Talpiot neighborhood in southeast Jerusalem. One male and three female soldiers were killed and 15 soldiers were injured. Of those injured, two were in critical condition after the attack. The attacker was shot dead by several of the soldiers and their civilian tour guide. Israeli officials describe the attack to be an "act of terrorism".

Initial reports, including an account by the civilian tour guide who used his personal handgun to shoot at the driver, alleged that one of the soldiers hesitated before shooting, possibly as a result of the manslaughter conviction earlier in the month of Sgt. Elor Azaria, who had killed an incapacitated Palestinian assailant. Despite this report, the IDF reported that at least two soldiers fired at the attacker, and denied a connection between troops' response to Azaria case. One of the cadets at the scene is quoted as saying that they fought for their friends and "Nobody was scared to shoot for even one minute".

== Victims ==
The four fatalities were IDF soldiers studying in the Haim Laskov officers school: three cadets and an officer.

- Lt. Yael Yekutiel, 20, from Givatayim
- Second Lt. Erez Orbach, 20, from Alon Shvut
- Lt. Shir Hajaj, 22, from Ma'ale Adumim
- Second Lt. Shira Tzur, 20, from Haifa

These ranks reflect their posthumous promotions.

== Perpetrator ==
A 28-year-old Arab Israeli man from Jabel Mukaber in East Jerusalem drove a car with an Israeli license plate. Nana 10 reported that he had served time in jail in the past, and Walla! reported he had Israeli citizenship.

Prime Minister Netanyahu blamed ISIL soon after the attack stating "all signs show he is a supporter of the Islamic State". The claims made by him just hours after the attack raised questions to how he came to that conclusion. Israeli defense minister Avigdor Lieberman also drew parallels with ISIL attacks in Germany and France. Opponents accused the Israeli government of downplaying politics, they claimed that Palestinian attacks are more motivated by nationalism rather than religion and considered Israeli accusations to be unconvincing for policymakers. Later reports stated that the perpetrator was a member of the Popular Front for the Liberation of Palestine, and that the PFLP had claimed him as their member. Others alleged that the perpetrator supported ISIL. A little-known Palestinian group called "The Martyr of Baha Alyan Collective" claimed responsibility on 9 January. It stated that it had no outside links, had acted on political motives and it wasn't its first attack. It also warned that it would carry out more attacks in the future.

== Aftermath ==
Of nine suspects taken into custody on suspicion of involvement, five were members of the perpetrator's family: his wife, parents, and two siblings. An Israeli Cabinet meeting was scheduled to discuss the event.

At 20:00 local time Channel 2 reported that shots had been fired from the Jabel Mukaber at the Israeli Border Patrol.

Channel 10 reported that Israel had started to put concrete obstacles around the village Jabel Mukaber. and it was removed after one month.

== Accusations of reporting controversies ==
NRG stated that the title used by the BBC, "Driver of lorry shot in Jerusalem after allegedly ramming pedestrians, injuring at least 15, Israeli media report", was biased. Later that day Honest Reporting, an advocacy group focused on defending Israel in the media, wrote that the BBC modified the title and iterated over several other titles. Mako have criticized Fox News and CNN in addition to BBC for the titles that they used to describe the event. Mako claimed that omitting such information (withholding that it was a terrorist attack and done by a Palestinian) constitutes falsifying the reports. Mako also claimed that it is the same case as it was during Sharona market shooting, the murder of Hadar Cohen and the March 2016 attacks. Honest Reporting also criticized CNN, New York Times, The Guardian and NPR. Honest Reporting called the news headlines biased when they do not explain the key factors of terror attack or fail to mention that they were carried out by a Palestinian assailant, or for refusing to use the term "terrorist".

== Reactions ==
=== Israel ===
- (Israel) The Israeli Cabinet decided that any person showing support for ISIS will be administratively detained, and that perpetrator's family house will be demolished.
- (Israel) MK Yoav Galant member of the Israeli Cabinet in an interview stated to the Army Radio "we should demolish houses and deport perpetrator's family, even if they have citizenship". later he asked to in an interview to Ynet he said the family should be deported to Syria. he also called for legislation that would give the interior minister authority to expel families of terrorists and revoke their national insurance benefits
- (Israel) Member of the Knesset Sharren Haskel in an interview to the BBC stated that the attack happened following incitements by Abu Mazen (Mahmoud Abbas).
- (Israel) Prime Minister Netanyahu criticized the Palestinian Authority (PA) for not condemning the attack and also criticized Palestinians for praising terrorism. Defence Minister Lieberman meanwhile alleged that the attack was the result of the inflammatory sermons President of the State of Palestine Mahmoud Abbas had ordered imams in mosques to preach.

=== International ===
- Hamas spokesman Abdul-Latif Qanou called it a "heroic" act and encouraged other Palestinians to do the same and "escalate the resistance." In the Gaza Strip, the ruling Hamas group praised the attack, calling it a "natural response to the Israeli occupier’s crimes" and proof that the "Jerusalem Intifada" was not over.
- Islamic Jihad Movement in Palestine termed the incident as a "natural response from Palestinians to the ongoing Israeli aggression and its violent treatment of Palestinian people."
- United Nations: Special Coordinator for the Middle East Peace Process Nickolay Evtimov Mladenov wrote on Twitter that "My thoughts go out to victims of shocking #terror attack in #Jerusalem. Must be condemned by all. Absolutely no excuses, no justifications!"
- European Union: Spokesperson for European Union Foreign Affairs chief Federica Mogherini condemned the terror attack in Jerusalem.
- Norway: Norway's Foreign Minister Børge Brende wrote "My most sincere condolences to the families of the killed and my thoughts to the victims and their loved ones".
- United States: Deputy Department Spokesperson Mark C. Toner: "We condemn in the strongest possible terms today's horrific vehicular attack by a terrorist in Jerusalem. There is absolutely no justification for these brutal and senseless attacks. We condemn the glorification of terrorism now or at any time and call on all to send a clear message that terrorism must never be tolerated."
- Germany: The Brandenburg Gate in Berlin was lit with the Flag of Israel as a gesture of solidarity with Israel and the victims of the attack in Jerusalem.

== See also ==
- List of violent incidents in the Israeli–Palestinian conflict, 2017
