= Cardo =

North–south street in ancient Roman cities

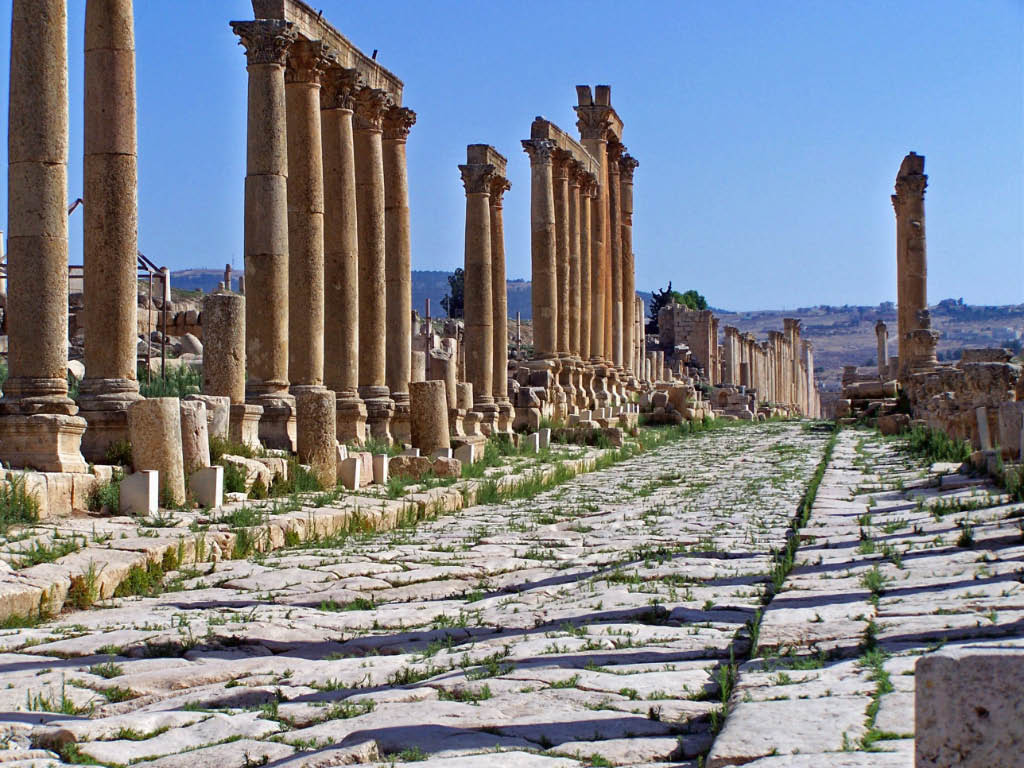
Roman cardo in Jerash, Jordan

A cardo (pl.: cardines) was a north–south street in ancient Roman cities and military camps as an integral component of city planning. The cardo maximus, or most often the cardo, was the main or central north–south-oriented street.

== Etymology ==
"Cardo" is the Latin word for "hinge". Being the hinge the turning point of the doors, the word cardo would also be used to designate other “turning points”, like the North Pole of the sky, or the four cardinal directions (quattuor cardines orbis terrarum). Also "the principal line laid down in surveying land was called cardo", which is also applied to the first street of a city: the street around which the city would be structured.

Most Roman cities also had a decumanus maximus, an east–west street that served as a secondary main street. Depending on local conditions, in some cities the decumanus was the main street and the cardo was secondary, but in general the cardo maximus served as the primary street. The forum was normally located at, or close to, the intersection of the decumanus and the cardo.

Historically the cardo-decumanus grid plan was invented by the famous ancient Greek architect and urban planner Hippodamus of Miletus.

== Examples ==
=== Apamea, Syria ===
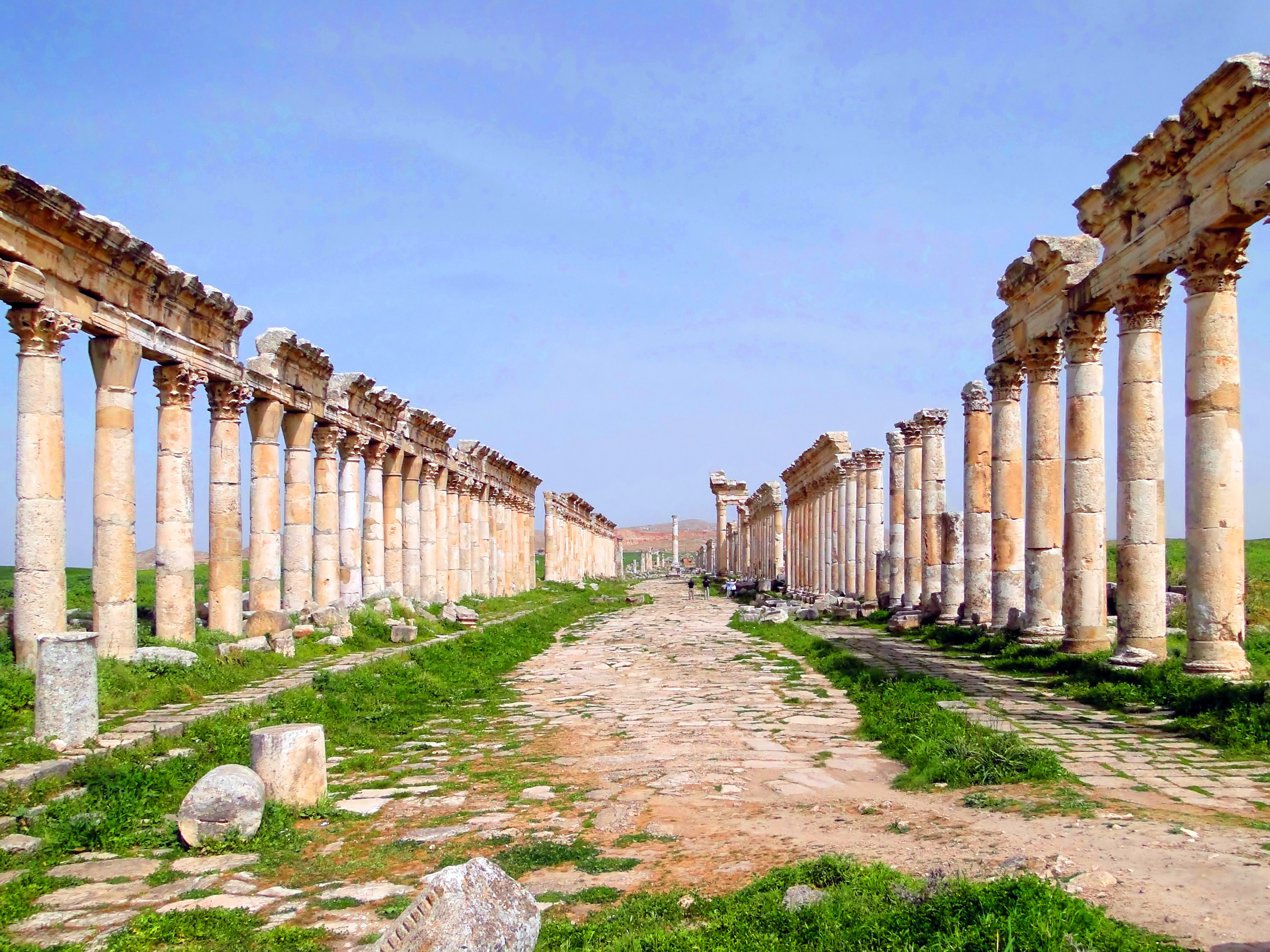
Cardo maximus of Apamea, Syria

The cardo maximus of Apamea, Syria, ran through the centre of the city directly from North to South, linked the principal gates of the city, and was originally surrounded by 1,200 columns with unique spiral fluting, each subsequent column spiralling in the opposite direction. The thoroughfare was about 1.85 kilometres long and 37 metres wide, as it was used for wheeled transport. The great colonnade was erected in the 2nd century and it was still standing until the 12th. The earthquakes of 1157 and 1170 demolished the colonnade. The cardo was lined on both sides with civic and religious buildings.

=== Cologne, Germany ===
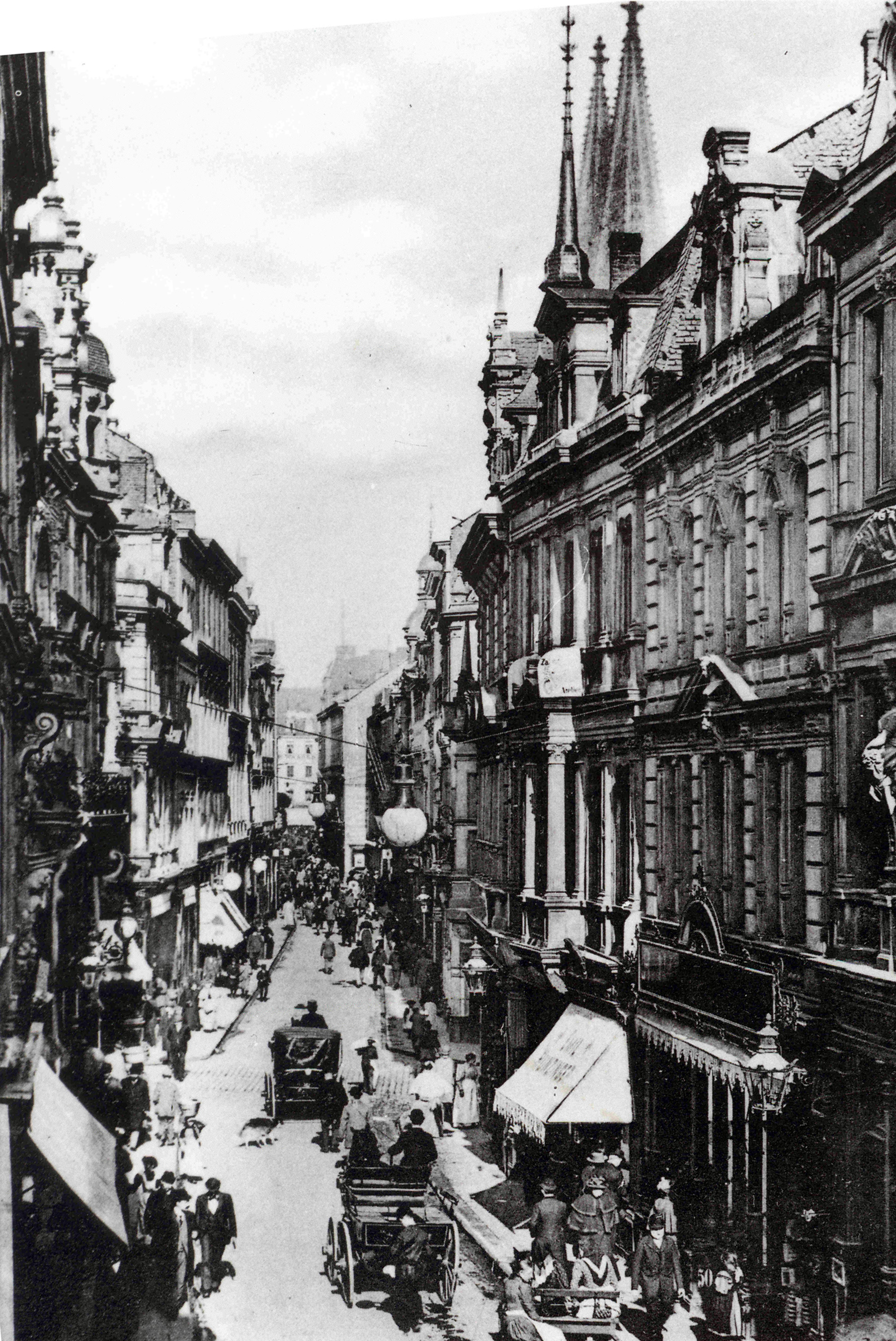
Hohe strasse, in Cologne, Germany, was the cardo maximus of the city in Roman times. (Pictured 1895)

Hohe Strasse and Schildergasse in Cologne, Germany, are examples of streets that have maintained their course and function of cardo and decumanus maximus to this day.

=== Jerash, Jordan ===
The excavations at Jerash, Jordan, have unearthed the remains of an ancient Roman city on the site, with the main feature of the city being a colonnaded cardo. The original road surface survived.

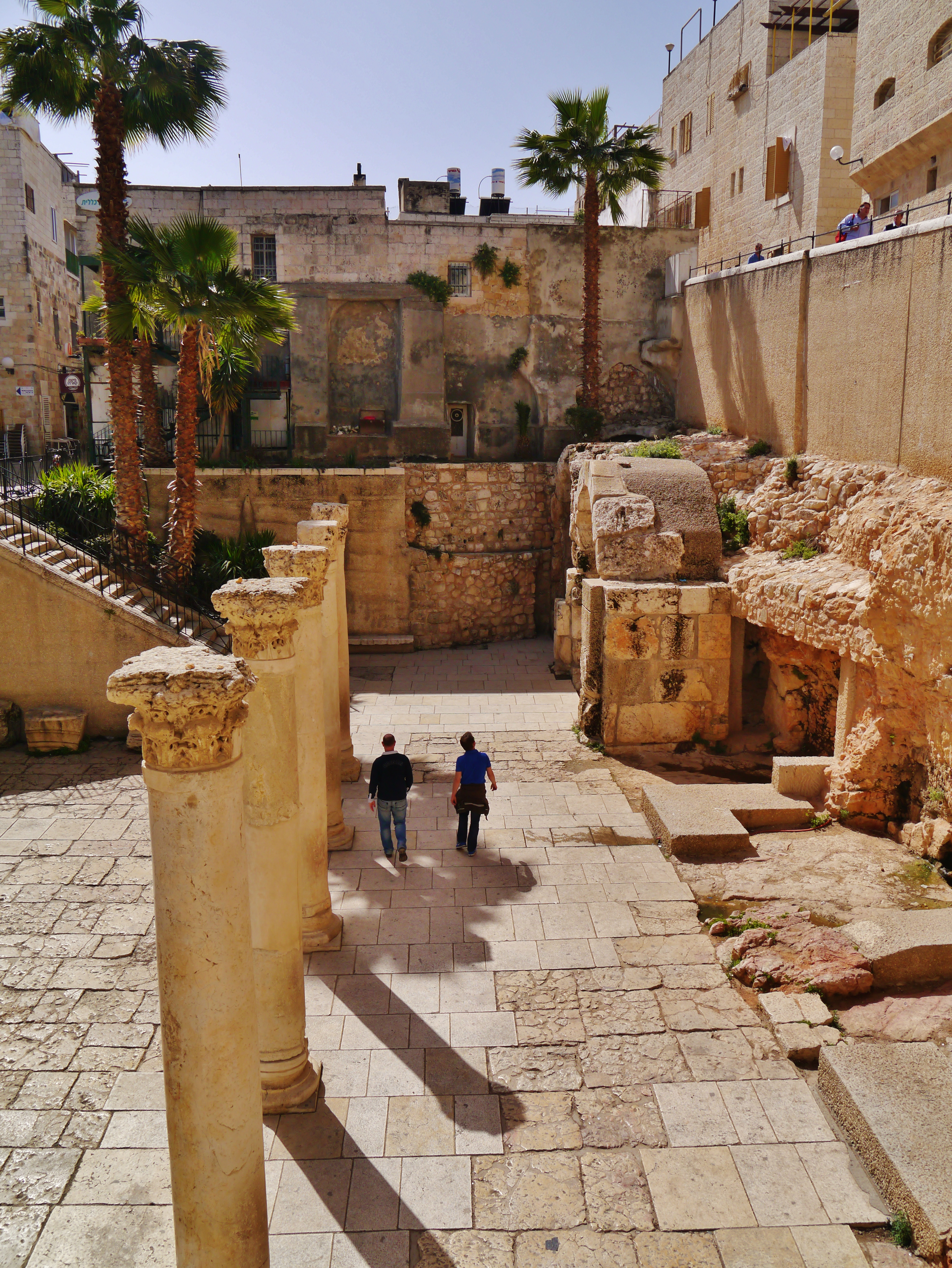
Remnants of the Cardo of the Old City of Jerusalem

=== Jerusalem ===
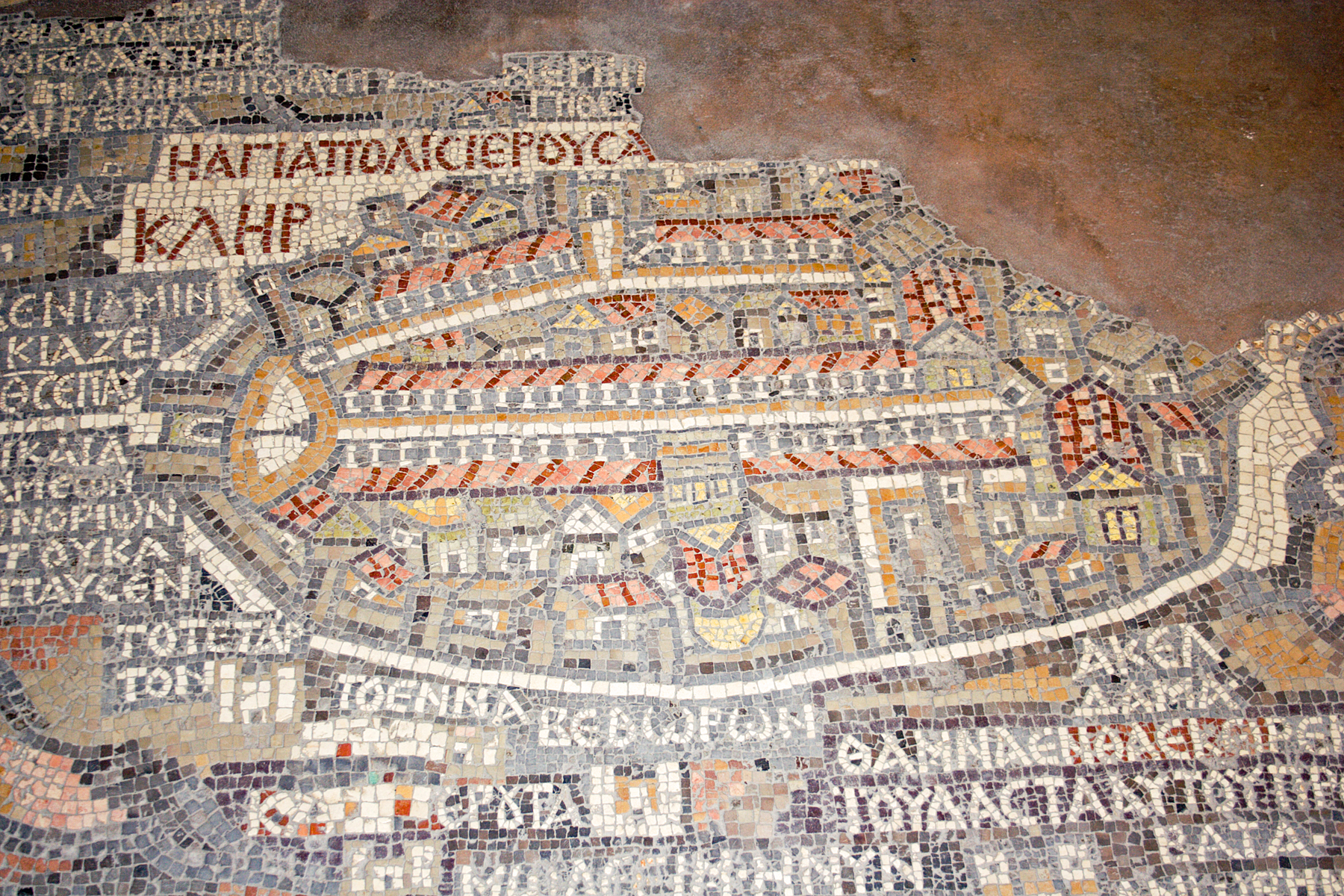
Madaba Map showing the Roman cardo in Jerusalem

During the visit of Hadrian to Judea in the 130s AD, Jerusalem's ruins were surveyed, and Hadrian decided to build a Roman colony in its place, naming it Colonia Aelia Capitolina, after the Roman deities Jupiter, Juno and Minerva (the Capitoline Triad), worshiped at the Capitoline Hill temple in Rome. Like many Roman colonies, Aelia Capitolina was laid out with a Hippodamian grid plan of narrower streets and wider avenues. Notably, the decision was one of the main causes of the Bar Kokhba revolt, which shortly encompassed the region.

The main north–south thoroughfare, the cardo maximus, was originally a paved avenue approximately 22.5 meters wide (roughly the width of a six lane highway) which ran southward from the site of the Damascus Gate, terminating at an unknown point. The southern addition to the cardo, constructed under Justinian in the 6th century AD, extended the road further south to connect the Church of the Holy Sepulchre with the newly built Zion Gate. Along its length, the roadway was divided into three parts: two colonnaded covered walks flanking a 12 meter wide road. The shaded porticoes provided separation of pedestrian traffic from wheeled carts, shelter from the elements, space for small-scale commerce, as well as opportunities for residents and visitors to gather and interact. The central open pavement provided commercial access as well as ritual space. The cardo's most striking visual feature was its colonnade, clearly depicted on the Madaba Map.

Simple bases supported monolithic shafts, spaced 5.77 meters apart. The shafts supported Byzantine-style Corinthian capitals – intricately carved, but more stylized versions of their Classical counterparts. Although this combination of elements was uniform the preserved examples display some variation in the profile and size of the bases, and in the pattern of the capitals. Despite aesthetic differences, the approximate height of the base, column, and capital units of the colonnade was five meters, a height which contributed to the spaciousness of the porticoes. The wall of the cardo's eastern portico featured an arcade that housed various stalls and workshops leased by craftsmen and merchants.

The line of the cardo maximus is still visible on the Jewish Quarter Street, though the original pavement lies several meters below the modern street level. In the 7th century, when Jerusalem fell under Muslim rule, the cardo became an Arab-style marketplace. Remains of the Byzantine cardo were found in the Jewish Quarter excavations beginning in 1969.

In 1971, a plan for preserving the ancient street was submitted by architects Peter Bogod, Esther Krendel and Shlomo Aronson. Their proposal relied heavily on the sixth century Madaba Map, a mosaic map of Jerusalem found in 1897 in Madaba, Jordan. The map clearly showed the Roman cardo as the main artery through the Old City. The architects proposed a covered shopping arcade that would preserve the style of an ancient Roman street using contemporary materials. Their plan was based on the hope that archeologists would find remains of the southern end of the cardo, an extension of the north–south Roman thoroughfare built during the Byzantine era (324–638).

Time was of the essence and mounting pressure to repopulate the Jewish Quarter led to the construction of a superstructure which allowed the residential buildings to be built. At the same time, the archaeologists continued to work below. The project was 180 meters in total and was divided into eight sections to allow for construction teams to move quickly from one section to another. By 1980, 37 housing units and 35 shops were built, incorporating archaeological finds such as a Hasmonean wall from the second century BC and rows of Byzantine columns. The combination of old and new is also visible on the Street of the Jews, where the shops have been set into old vaults and the gallery is covered by an arched roof containing small apertures to allow for natural lighting.

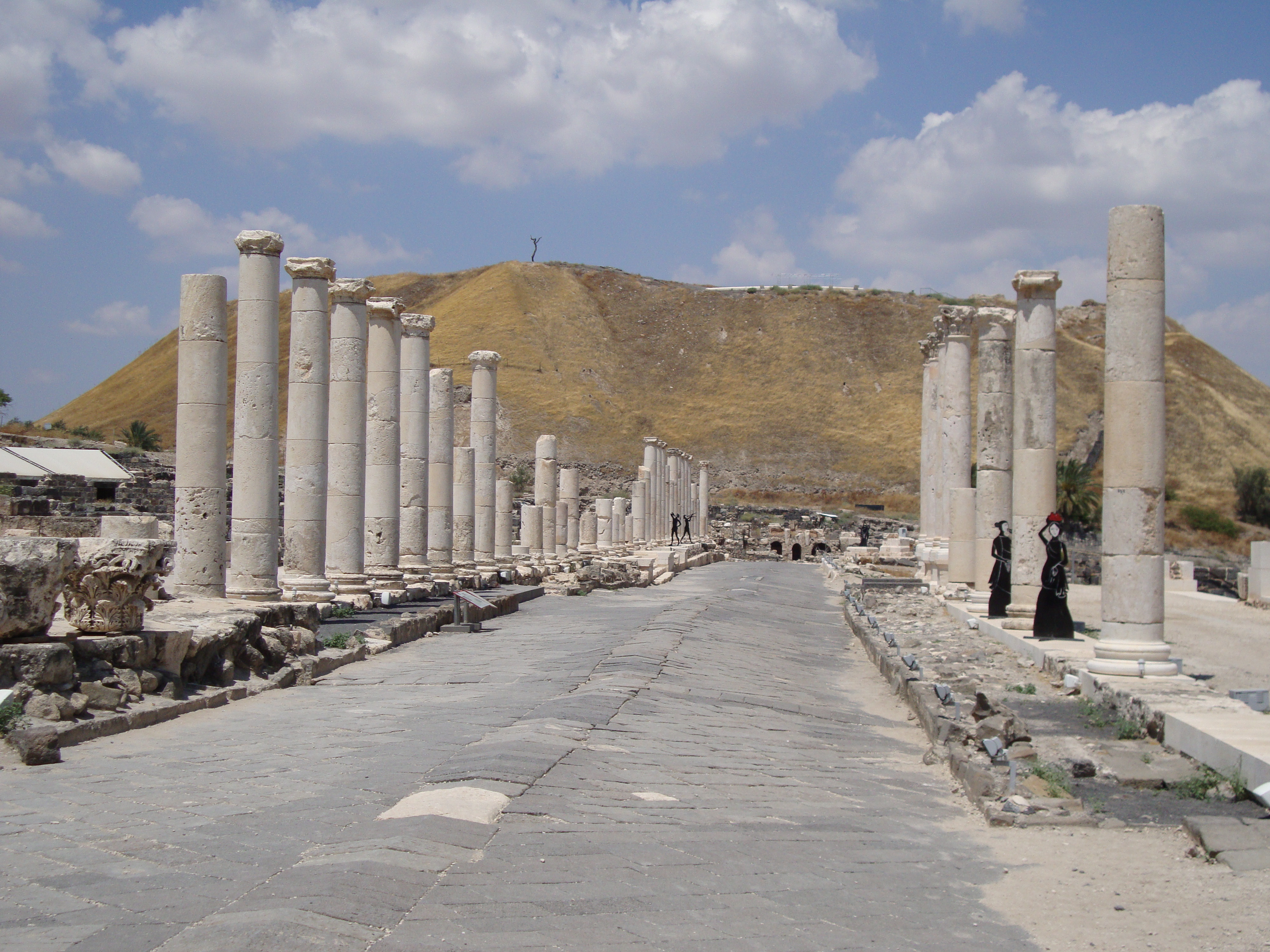
Roman cardo in Beit She'an, Israel

=== Beit She'an, Israel ===
Scythopolis, present-day Beit She'an, was one of a group of 10 Hellenistic cities known as Decapolis on the eastern frontier of the Roman Empire in Syria and Judea. It was a self-governed city established by the Romans to promote Roman culture. It was built with a central cardo, temples, theaters, baths and other public buildings, and minted its coins.

=== Beirut, Lebanon ===
The cardo maximus was the main north–south street of Roman Berytus. A section of the street – 100 meters long or so – was discovered during excavation works, flanked by two rows of limestone pedestals. These pedestals once carried 6-meter-high columns supporting roofed colonnades on either side of the street. A stairway in the eastern colonnade gave access to a large building complex.

The cardo maximus connected the forum to another complex that extended from the present Al-Azariyeh building to Riad Al Solh Square. Archaeological excavations uncovered two successive levels of the street, the oldest dating to the 2nd century CE. The later, wider street was laid out during the 4th century AD. The floors of the colonnades on both levels of the cardo maximus were embellished with mosaic pavements. These were covered, in the 6th century CE, with a thin coat of white lime plaster. Fragments of the floors remained in use until the 19th century. Roman columns were re-used in the foundations of later buildings constructed within the pavement of the cardo, reducing the main street of Roman Berytus into a small alley.

=== Poreč, Croatia ===
In the seaside resort of Poreč, Croatia, both cardo maximus and decumanus have retained their original names and still serve as the main streets of the historic town centre.

== See also ==
- Ancient Baths of Alauna
