= Armon Hanatziv Promenade =

Three connected promenades in East Jerusalem

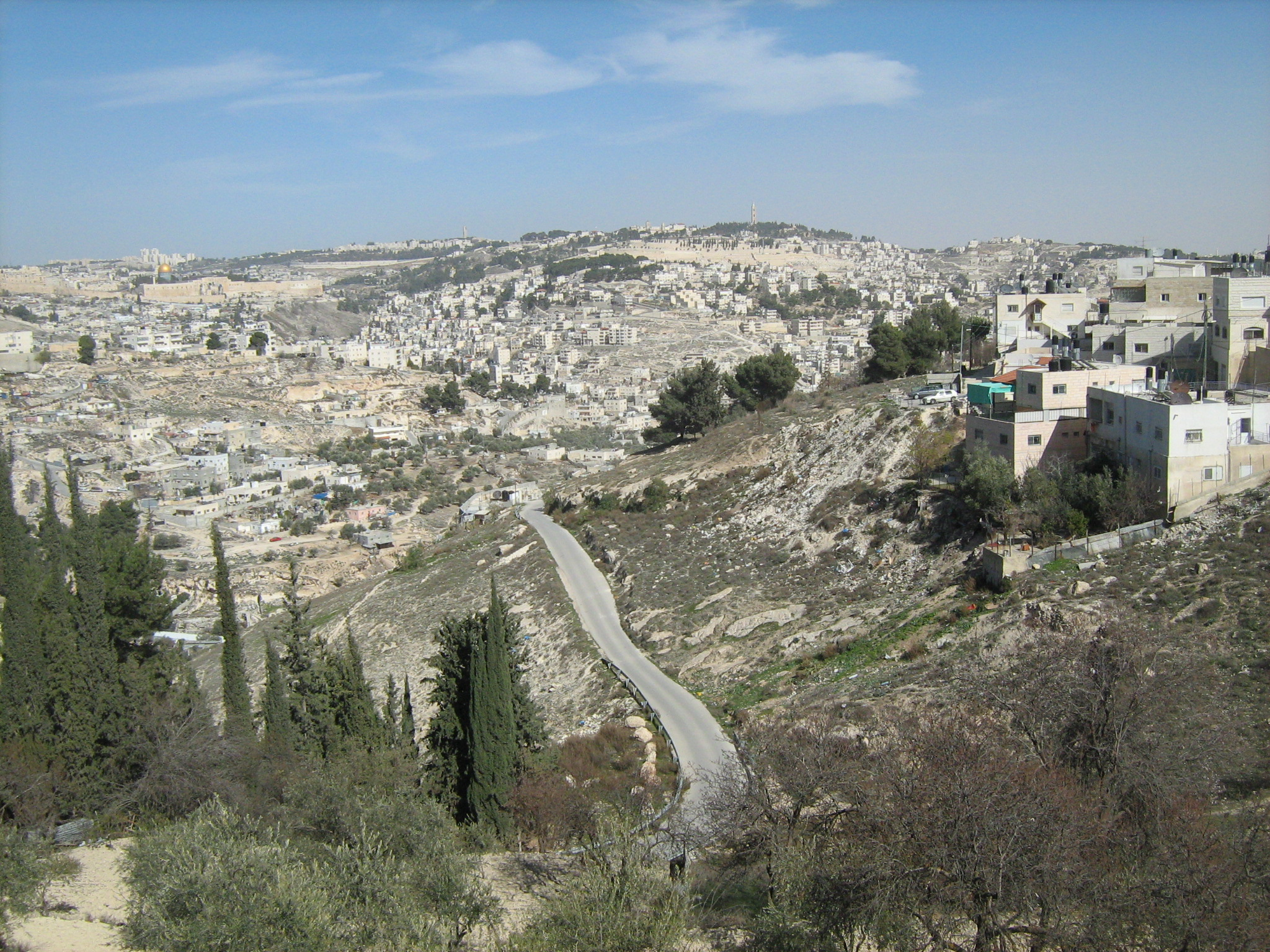
A overlook of Jerusalem from the Gabriel-Sherover Promenade, facing northwest toward the Old City. The Dome of the Rock is visible on the left.

The Armon Hanatziv Promenade (ha-Tayelet, "the Promenade") is the collective name of three connected promenades located in the city of Jerusalem. The three promenades are the Gabriel-Sherover Promenade which branches towards the northwest, the Rhoda Goldman Promenade which branches to the east, and the Haas Promenade which connects the two together. In total, the Armon Hanatziv Promenade spans approximately 2.5 kilometers or 1.5 miles. The name originates from the British occupation of the region of Palestine. The high commissioners for Palestine and Transjordan, which was the highest authority in the region at the time, established their seat of government near where the promenade now stands, hence the name "Armon Hanatziv" or in English, "Commissioner's Palace". Most of the Armon Hanatziv Promenade is located in the East Talpiot (or Armon Hanatziv) neighborhood. The Armon Hanatziv Promenade has been described as a "Hot-spot" for terrorist attacks in the ongoing Israeli–Palestinian conflict.

== Design and construction ==
=== Haas Promenade ===
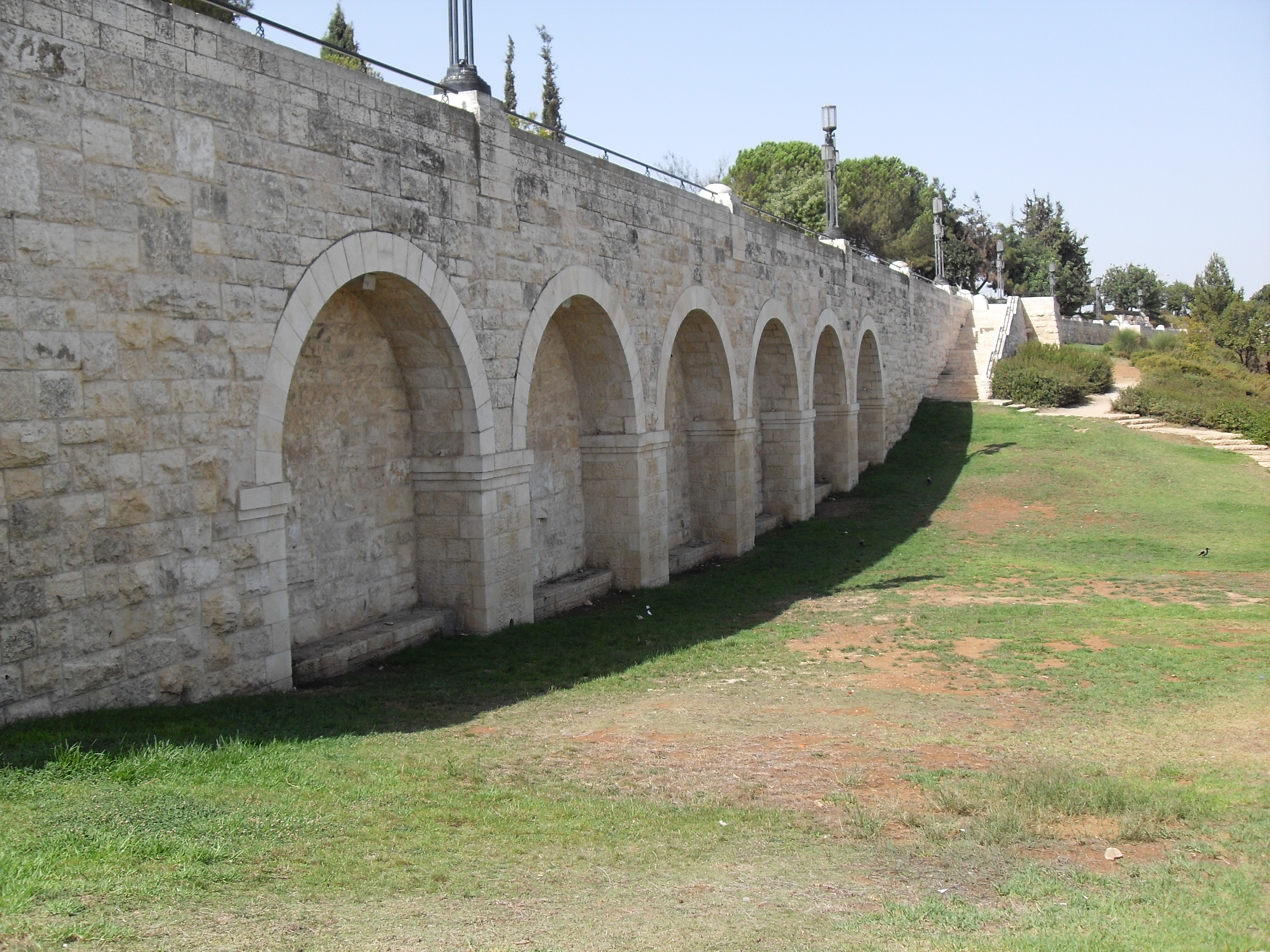
A portion of the Haas promenade. The aqueduct-like arches can be seen.

The Haas Promenade started construction in 1984 and was design by Lawrence Halprin with the assistance of Shlomo Aronson. It is approximately 1300 feet or 395 meters long. From the start, the Armon Hanatziv Promenade was explicitly designed to be a belvedere, a structure designed to take advantage of scenic views. Early blueprints show that the promenade is oriented towards the Old City of Jerusalem and the Dome of the Rock. The Haas Promenade takes heavy inspiration from ancient Israeli aqueducts. The arches of the wall are intentionally designed to mimic ancient aqueducts and it also purposefully follows the same path of these aqueducts. It's primarily constructed with sandstone and flint sourced from local quarries.

=== Gabriel-Sherover Promenade ===
The Gabriel-Sherover Promenade started construction in 1989 and was a continuation of the Haas Promenade. It is approximately 1350 feet or 410 meters long. It was also designed by Lawrence Halprin with the assistance of Shlomo Aronson. A key feature of the Gabriel-Sherover Promenade is the references to Israeli agriculture. Olive trees and wheat was planted along the promenade, both common crops in the region of Palestine. Much like the Haas promenade, the Gabriel-Sherover promenade takes advantage of the scenic views. The Judean Desert, Mount of Olives, Downtown Jerusalem and the Old City are all visible from this promenade. Much like the Haas Promenade, the Gabriel-Sherover Promenade was made with Sandstone and Flint mined from local quarries.

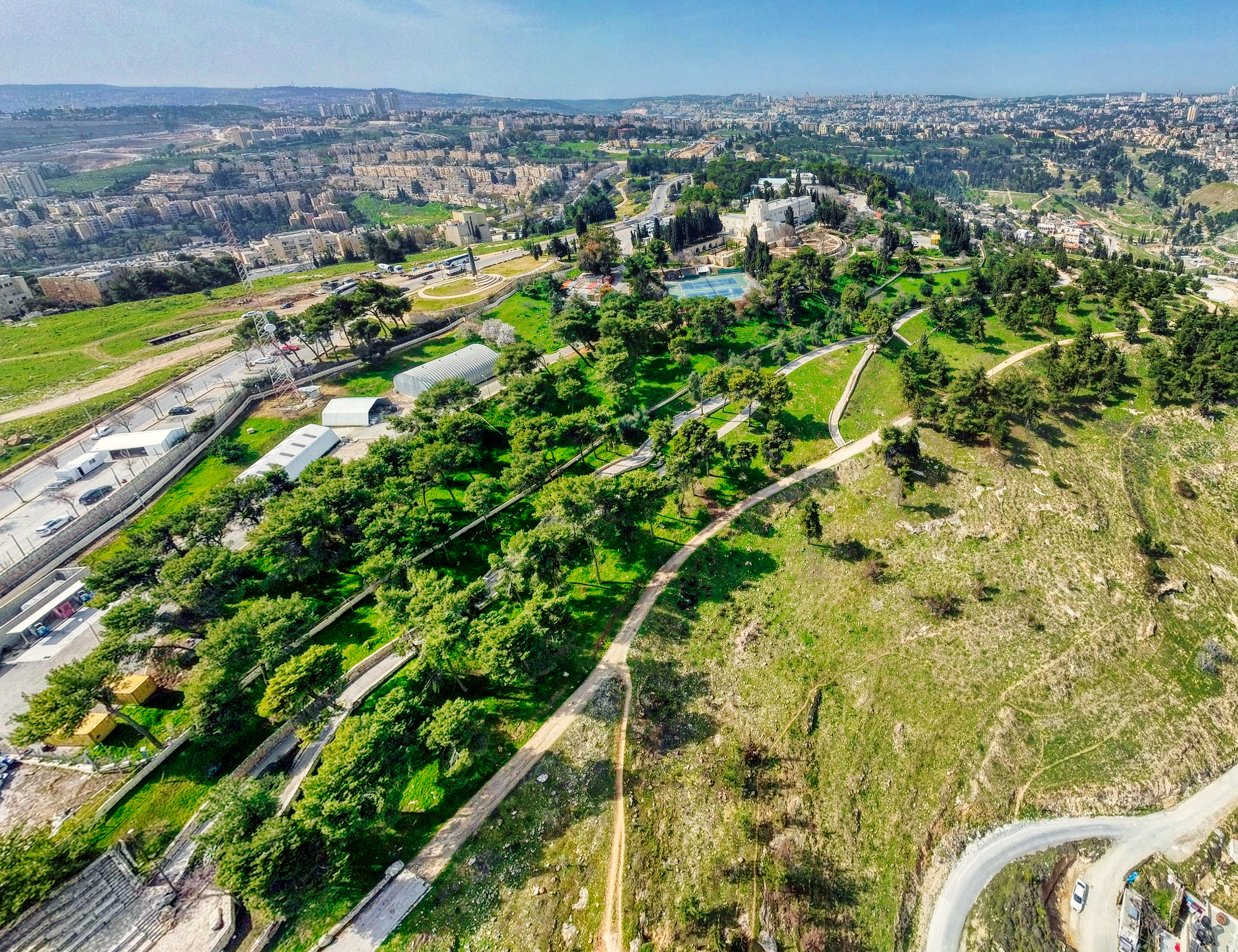
A portion of the Rhoda Goldman Promenade, as seen from above.

=== Rhoda Goldman Promenade ===
The Rhoda Goldman Promenade started construction in 2002 and was the final stage of the Armon Hanatziv Promenade. It was funded by Rhoda Goldman at a cost of 4 million dollars. It was designed by Lawrence Halprin and Bruce Levin. The Goldman Promenade passes through the former British high commissioner's garden, now a pine forest. Great efforts were taken preserve the existing nature around the commissioner's garden. Notably, no trees were cut down during construction, despite passing through a forest.

== History ==
Since 2008, the holiday of Sigd has been celebrated at the Armon Hanatziv Promenade.

From 2000 to 2017, there have been at least six attacks on the Armon Hanatziv Promenade. (Note: Source cited explicitly only includes attacks that targets jews.)

On 17 October 2015, a 16 year old Palestinian named Muataz Awisat was shot and killed on the Armon Hanatziv Promenade. He was shot after he reportedly attempted to stab an Israeli Border Police officer, however, this narrative has been criticized and disputed.

On 10 May 2016, two elderly Jewish woman were stabbed at the Haas Promenade. The two women who were stabbed survived the attack. The perpetrators, two teenage boys, were arrested and charged in relation to the crime.

On 8 January 2017, a truck attack occurred at the promenade, killing four soldiers and injuring 16.

Throughout the years, there have been many attempts made to redevelop the high value land the promenade occupies into expensive properties, including a foreign embassy. However, these attempts have repeatedly been blocked by the Jerusalem Municipality, the Jerusalem Foundation and formerly mayor Teddy Kollek. However, as of 2026 proposal by the City of Jerusalem to renovate portions of the Sherover Promenade has been issued a permit and is currently under construction. This proposal involves building a hotel called the Reches Hotel atop the Sherover Promenade and a monument for those killed in the 2017 Jerusalem truck attack.

In 2020, archaeologists from the Israel Antiquities Authority unearthed an 2700 year old palace underneath the Armon Hanatziv Promenade. Findings included a toilet, a septic tank and dozens of other stone artifacts.
