= Baths of Nero =

Historical ancient structure in Rome

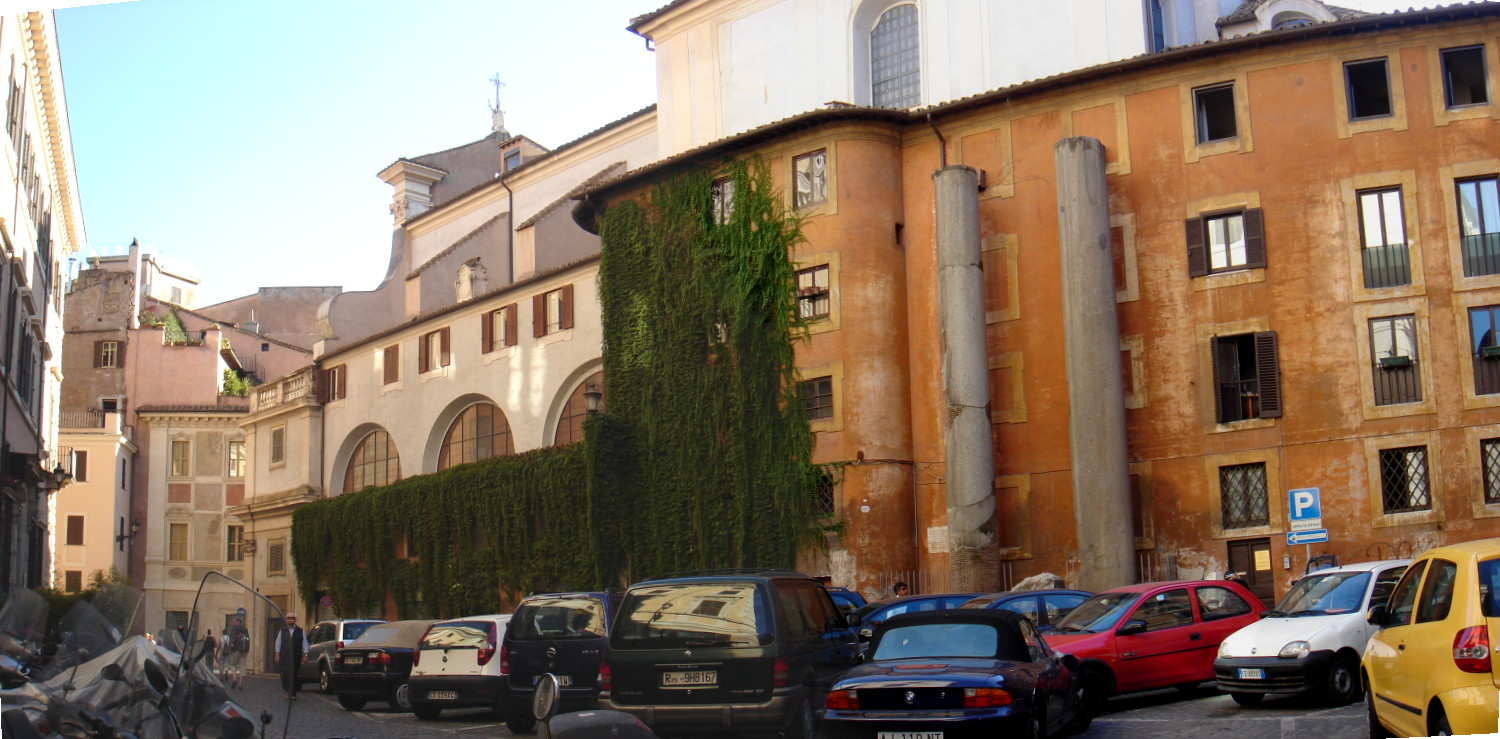
- Two columns from the baths near the church of Sant' Eustachio on Via di Sant'Eustachio; three other columns from the baths also survive, supporting the portico of the Pantheon

- Shown within Augustan Rome
- Click on the map for a fullscreen view
- 41.8987°N 12.4758°E
- Location: Rome, Italy

The Baths of Nero (Thermae Neronis) or Baths of Alexander (Thermae Alexandrinae) were a complex of ancient Roman baths on the Campus Martius in Rome, built by Nero in either 62 or 64 and rebuilt by Alexander Severus in 227 or 229. It stood between the Pantheon and the Stadium of Domitian and were listed among the most notable buildings in the city by Roman authors and became a much-frequented venue. These thermae were the second large public baths built in Rome, after the Baths of Agrippa, and it was probably the first "imperial-type" complex of baths, with a monumental scale and symmetrical, axially-planned design. While in the sixteenth century the foundations of the caldarium were still visible, nothing else of the structure remains above ground except some fragments of walls incorporated into the structure of Palazzo Madama.

== Overview ==
The thermae covered an area of about 190 by 120 metres. Their extent is shown by the modern-day Piazza della Rotonda, Via del Pozzo delle Cornacchie and Via della Dogana Vecchia, which now cover the site. The complex's water was initially supplied by the Aqua Virgo – already supplying the neighbouring Baths of Agrippa – then by the newly built Aqua Alexandrina after its restoration in the reign of the early third century emperor Alexander Severus, after whom it was subsequently renamed, though some continued to give it Nero's name.

== Restoration ==
The restoration was part of the extensive building program that Severus undertook during his reign, which also included the restoration of the Baths of Caracalla, the Colosseum, the Temple of Serapis, Circus Maximus, and the Alexandrian nymphaeum, among others.

== Identification ==
There is some contradiction among ancient sources with regards to whether the Baths of Nero and the Baths of Alexander are the same. Some affirmed that they are identical, while some claim that the two structures were merely close to each other. It is also suggested that the Severus added his baths to the existing facility built by Nero.

== Design ==
Its construction was celebrated by a probable depiction of the baths on a coin of Alexander Severus. According to Sidonius Apollinaris, it was still in use in the fifth century. Its appearance is known from Renaissance drawings made by Palladio and Antonio da Sangallo the Younger and may substantially represent the design as it was the time of Nero. The overall layout of the baths has been confirmed by archaeological findings. It fronted north, and was aligned with its walls facing the points of the compass. In the centre of the colder northern side was the natatio (swimming pool) flanked by two lateral peristyles, which may have been used as palaestrae. At the centre was the frigidarium with four adjoining chambers in the corners, flanked on either side by two apodyteria (changing rooms). South of these a tepidarium flanked by two rooms that may have been sudatoria or laconica (steam rooms) led finally to the southern, hottest end of the complex, where the caldarium stood projecting from the walls on either side, receiving the most sunlight and surrounded by praefurnia or propignea (chambers leading to the furnaces heating the whole thermae). An account stated that forests had been officially designated as sources for its heating fuel and that special taxes were imposed for its maintenance.

== Ruins ==
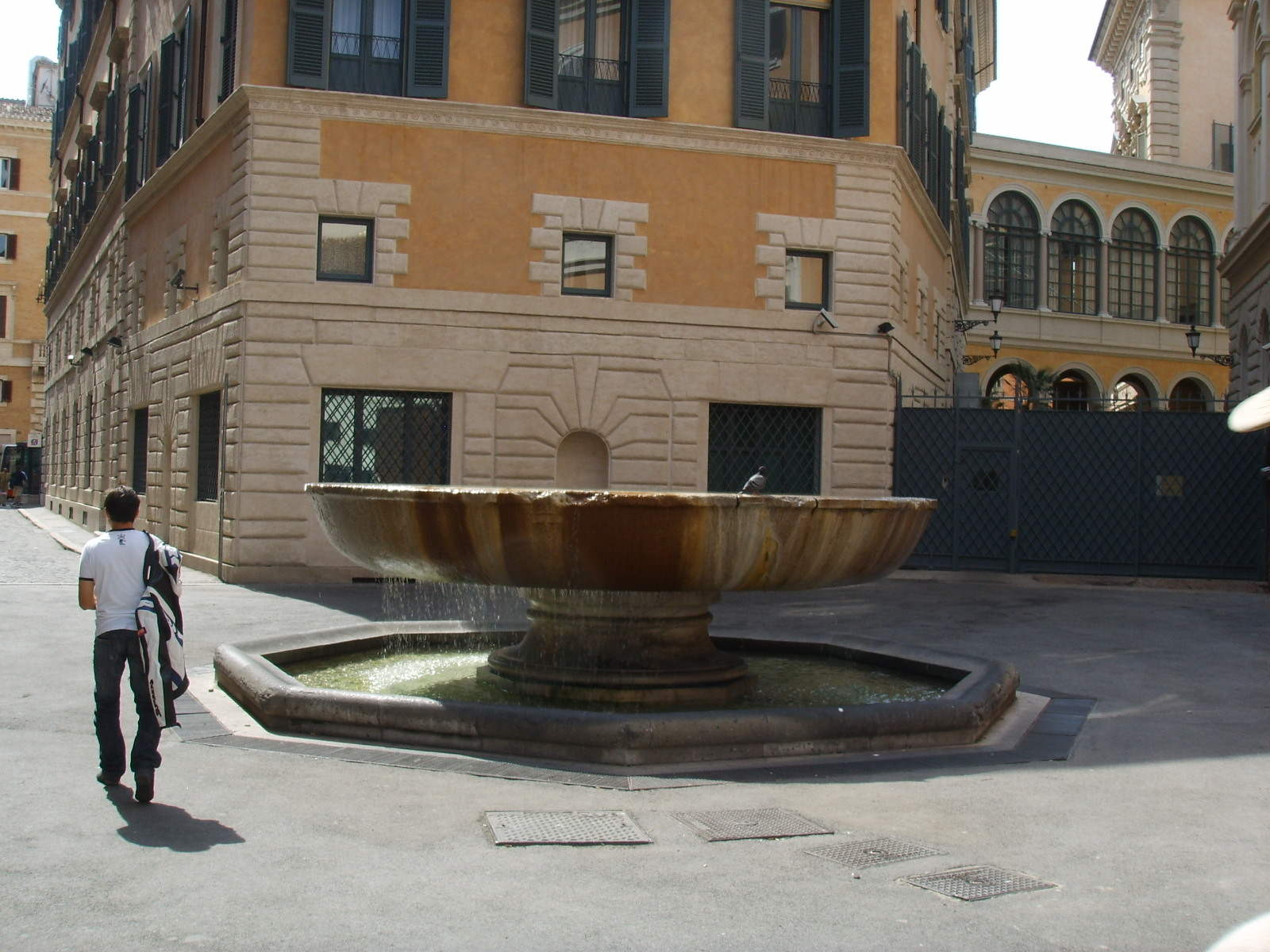
The Fontana del Senato on Via degli Staderari, re-using a fountain basin from the baths.

Pipes from the Neronian structure were discovered between the Piazza and the Salita dei Crescenzi. Neronian opus caementicium (concrete) has also been discovered. Brick stamps dating from the re-building by Alexander Severus were found in the remains of a hypocaust in Palazzo Madama in 1871. Another hypocaust was found on the site of San Salvatore in Thermis.

== Reuse ==
The ruins have been the source for numerous architectural fragments and sculptures re-used in subsequent centuries. Columns of grey granite, pavonazzetto, and even imperial porphyry were used in the architecture. Some of these, and their white marble capitals, have been found on the site. Several carved stone baths, including an "enormous basin for a fountain 6.70 metres in diameter, cut from a single block of red granite, with pieces of several others" have been found, together with the two complete basins described below.

A monumental monolithic grey granite basin, a labrum, was removed from the site of the baths to the Villa Medici and was in the late eighteenth century moved to Florence. Since 1840, it has stood in the Medici's Boboli Gardens in Florence.

The ruins of the baths also supplied an ornate column capital from the third century renovations of the baths. This capital, carved in relief with scenes of athletic triumph and the wreathing of the victor, was used as the base for the ancient Roman bronze fountain called Fontana della Pigna when it was moved to its present position in the exhedra of the Vatican's Cortile del Belvedere in 1608.

In the seventeenth century, during a renovation of the nearby Pantheon ordered by Pope Alexander VII, three pink granite columns from the Baths of Nero were used to replace the row of three columns on the damaged extreme eastern end of the Pantheon's pronaos. These columns are themselves badly damaged. Another column of pink granite was removed and re-erected in 1896 near the Porta Pia as a triumphal column, known as the Monument to the Porta Pia Breach, supporting a winged victory in bronze and dedicated to the Breach of Porta Pia during the 1870 Capture of Rome, the final military action of Italian unification. Two further granite columns from the baths have been re-erected on-site beside the minor basilica of Sant'Eustachio.

In the late 1980s, building work on the erstwhile Medici residence the Palazzo Madama, now seat of the Italian Senate, brought to light another monumental stone basin – round and of bichromatic black-red Egyptian granite. The basin, which probably stood in the caldarium for hot-water bathing, was restored (it had broken in three places) and was donated by the president of the Senate Giovanni Spadolini to the citizenry of Rome with a public ceremony. It is now a fountain – the Fontana del Senato – on a Renaissance pedestal in the area since renamed Piazza della Costituente, which connects Via degli Staderari with Via della Dogana vecchia and the Piazza Sant'Eustachio.

== See also ==
- List of Roman public baths
- List of ancient monuments in Rome
- Ancient Baths of Alauna

== Bibliography ==
- Filippo Coarelli, Guida archeologica di Roma, Verona: Arnoldo Mondadori Editore, 1984.
- Gerd Grasshoff & Christian Berndt, "Decoding the Pantheon Columns." Architectural Histories, vol. 18, 2(1), 2014.
- John R. Patterson, "The City of Rome: From Republic to Empire." The Journal of Roman Studies, vol. 82, 1992, pp. 186–215.
- Samuel Ball Platner, A Topographical Dictionary of Ancient Rome, (as completed and revised by Thomas Ashby), London: Oxford University Press, 1929. pp. 531–532 "Thermae Neronianae or Alexandrinae"
- Romolo Augusto Staccioli, Acquedotti, fontane e terme di Roma antica, Rome: Newton & Compton, 2005.

| Preceded by Baths of Diocletian | Landmarks of Rome; Baths of Nero | Succeeded by Baths of Trajan |
