= Ben-Gurion International Airport Garden =

Coordinates: 31°59′57.34″N 34°52′10.82″E

The Ben-Gurion International Airport Garden is a garden outside Terminal 3 of Ben-Gurion International Airport on the outskirts of Tel Aviv, Israel, designed by the architecture firm of Shlomo Aronson.

== History ==
Originally, the design of the airport included one parking garage but at the suggestion of local lead architect Ram Karmi, the garage was split in two structures in order to provide a space for the Central Garden. Because of its location, the garden is meant to be experienced from “particular elevated vantage points as a portrait” rather than by movement through it. The placement of the garden also provides a view out to the surrounding landscape as opposed to a view of the facade of the parking structure. The garden is meant to provide an abstract interpretation of the regional landscape from ocean to mountains.

== Layout ==
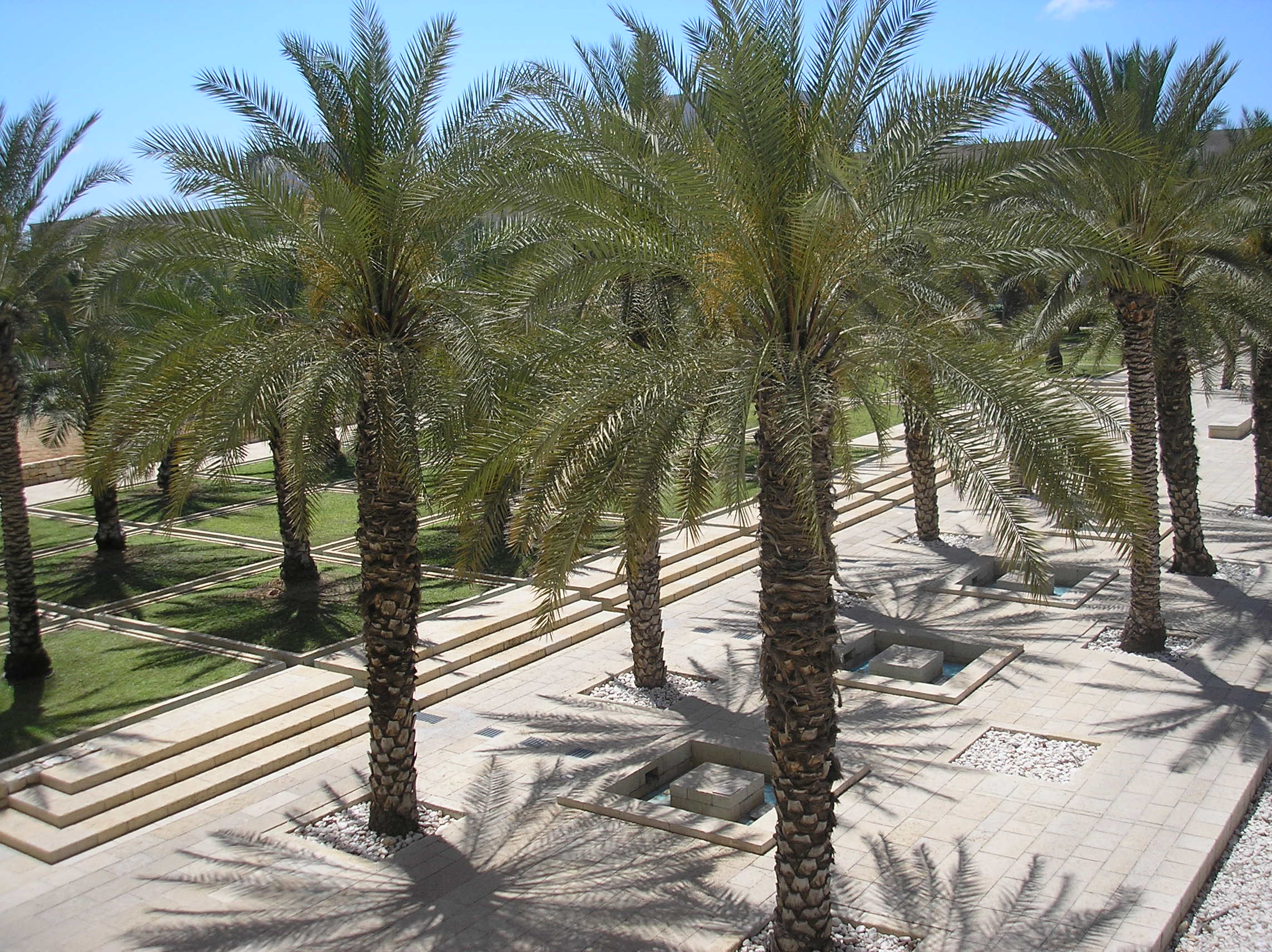
Figure 1: The Promenade at the Central Garden of the Ben-Gurion International Airport

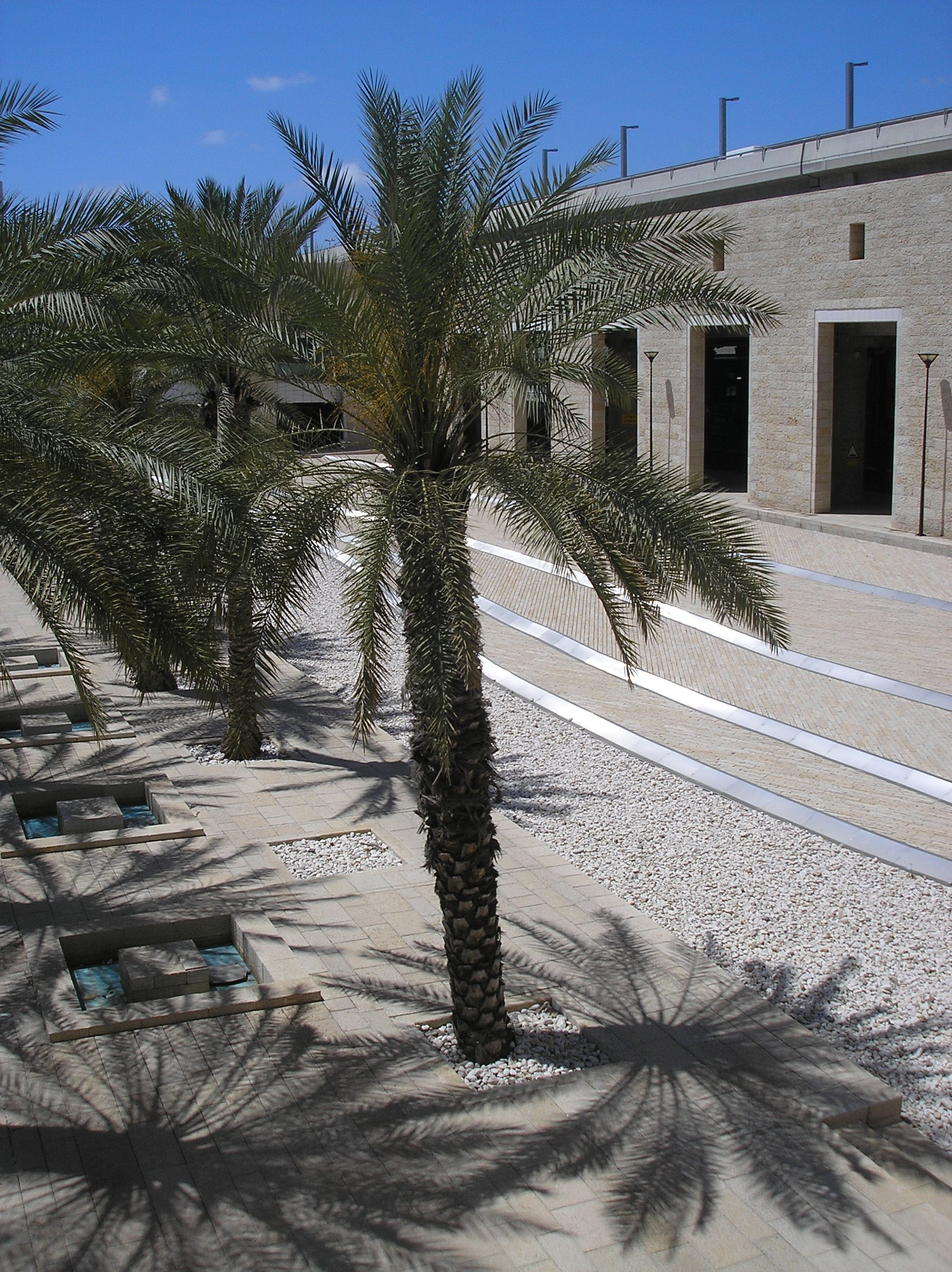
Figure 2: The "Mediterranean Sea" at the Central Garden of the Ben-Gurion International Airport

The overall concept was for the design, which includes a larger 65-acre (26 ha) site that includes a road and an interchange in addition to the 5-acre (2.0 ha) Central Garden, was for it to relate strongly to the surrounding landscape. Plants common to the area were selected based on their regional presence. The gradual elevation change (approximately 15 feet (4.6 m)) within the garden is meant to symbolize the ascent from Tel Aviv to Jerusalem while also accommodating the practical requirement of the connecting various elevations of the parking garages with adjacent roads. Aronson symbolizes the Mediterranean coastline through the formal arrangement of materials like stone (a local limestone) and stainless steel. Gravel is used to represent the beaches of the western border of Israel, and a grid of palm trees recalls the seaside promenades that are growing in popularity within Israel. The grid arrangement also references the agricultural plantings of palm trees in the region. With the shift in elevation through the site comes a change from paved surface to planted areas of wheat fields, grasses, and orange groves. Small channels of water run through the garden, using a traditional technique for areas prone to rapid evaporation and indicating the need for human intervention in hydrating the arid landscape. The uppermost terrace contains a grove of olive trees, a tree common to the Judean Mountains around Jerusalem and the highest elevations within the country. Shlomo Aronson and project architect Barbara Aronson intended for the garden to be an abstraction of the region that allows visitors to gain a “deeper feeling of place” regardless of religious or political affiliations.

== Symbolism ==
Aronson says the Central Garden was designed as a "connective experience" that links up with the agrarian landscape along the route to Jerusalem, with its citrus orchards, agricultural fields, olive groves, and stone terraces.

== Awards ==
The Ben-Gurion Airport Central Garden won an Award of Honor in the Professional General Design Category from the American Society of Landscape Architects in 2005.

== Bibliography ==
- Aronson, Shlomo. Shlomo Aronson: Making Peace with the Land: Designing Israel's Landscape. Washington, D.C: Spacemaker Press, 1998.
- Aronson, Shlomo, and Barbara Aronson. "Ben Gurion International Airport in Lod." Topos: the international review of landscape architecture and urban design 53 (2005): 60–4.
- Loon, Leehu. "Abstracting the Israeli Landscape: This Garden Well Expresses the Landscape of Israel, without Political References - Too Bad most Visitors Can't Find it." Landscape Architecture 97.3 (2007): 28, 30–2.
