= Shlomo Aronson (landscape architect) =

Israeli landscape architect

- שלמה אהרונסון
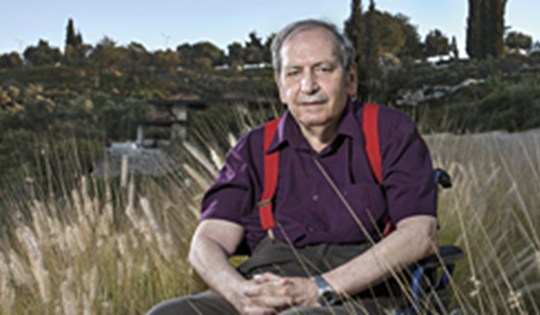
- Born: November 27, 1936; Haifa, Mandatory Palestine
- Died: September 12, 2018 (aged 81)
- Education: University of California, Berkeley (BLA, 1963); Harvard Graduate School of Design (MLA, 1966)
- Occupation: Landscape architect
- Awards: Global Award for Sustainable Architecture (2011); Yakir Yerushalayim (2012)

Shlomo Aronson (Hebrew: שלמה אהרונסון; November 27, 1936 – September 12, 2018) was an Israeli landscape architect. His works range from master plans for reforestation to archaeological parks and freeway planting schemes to urban plazas.

== Biography ==
Shlomo Aronson was born in Haifa, Mandatory Palestine. Aronson went to the United States to study landscape architecture as an undergraduate student and received his Bachelor of Landscape Architecture (BLA) from the University of California, Berkeley in 1963. He went on to study at the Harvard Graduate School of Design where he received his Master of Landscape Architecture in 1966. Aronson returned to Israel, and lived and worked in Ein Kerem, Jerusalem.

== Academic career ==
Aronson taught at Bezalel Academy, Jerusalem, Department of Architecture 1979 – 1985, 1992; Harvard Graduate School of Design, Urban Design Department, Guest Critic, Spring 1981, Spring 1982, Fall 1997; Harvard Graduate School of Design, Landscape Architecture Department, Visiting Professor, Fall 1985, Spring 1988, Fall 1997; Hebrew University of Jerusalem, The Institute of Urban and Regional Studies, 2000–2001. He has been a guest lecturer at various American, Canadian, Italian, German, Indian, Russian and South African universities.

== Architectural career ==
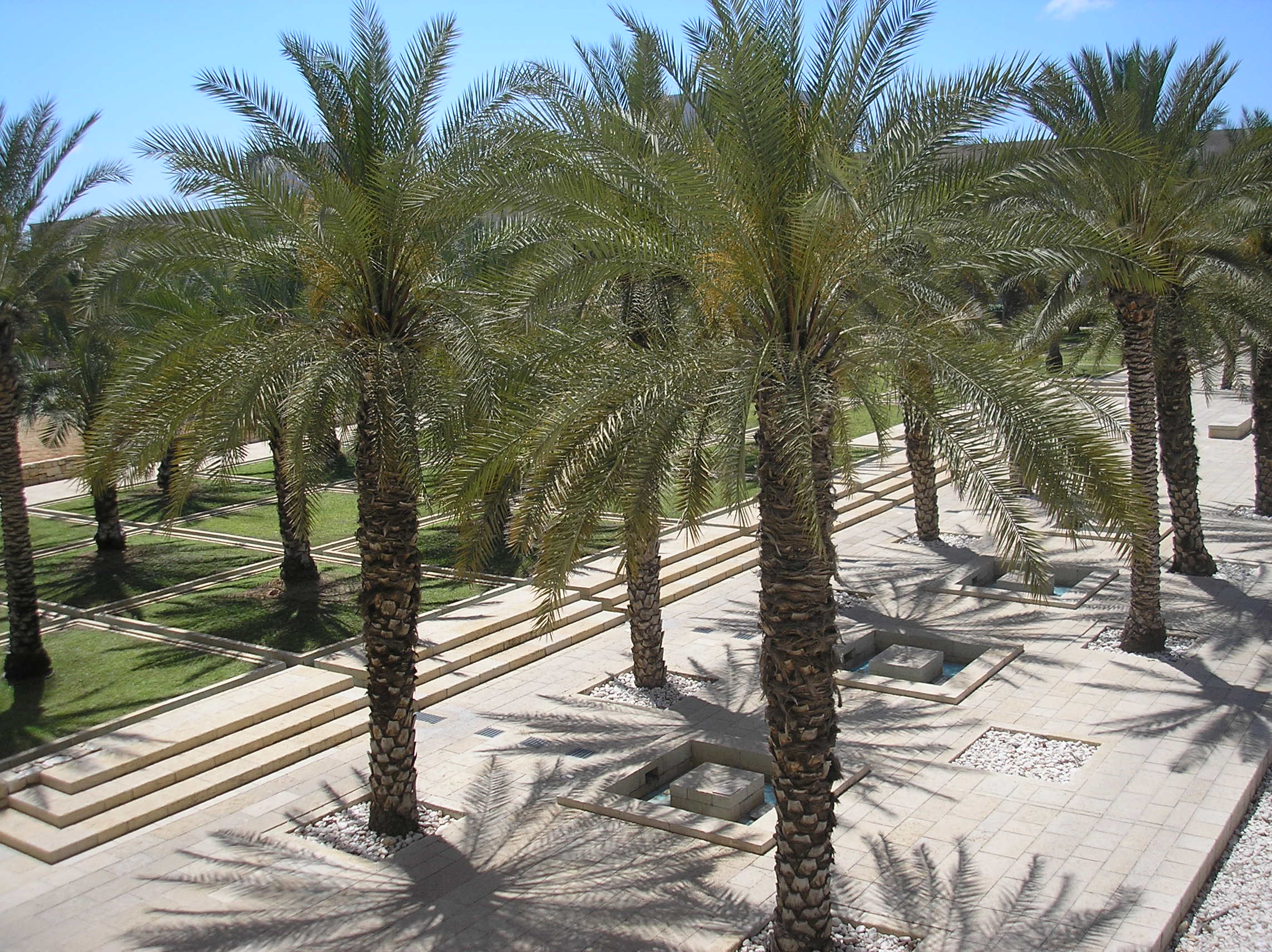
Central Garden at the Ben-Gurion International Airport

Prior to receiving his master's degree, Aronson worked in Lawrence Halprin's office in San Francisco, California from 1963 to 1965. The field of landscape architecture was developing at this time to include large scale projects that incorporated transportation and community planning. In his foreword to "Making Peace with the Land," Halprin recognized Aronson's desire to work on larger scale projects and his interest in their "social context and the impact they world have on society."

Aronson was part of The Architects' Collaborative in Cambridge Massachusetts in 1966 and The Greater London Council, Architecture Department from 1966 to 1967. Aronson joined the Jerusalem City Engineer's Department in 1968. In 1969, Aronson became the owner and director of Shlomo Aronson and Associates, a multi-disciplinary office that includes landscape architects, architects, and urban planners in Jerusalem. Aronson was also the Chairman of the Israel Associates of Landscape Architects from 1991 to 1998.

== Design philosophy ==
Aronson's work is characterized by its attention to moral and historical issues of place and culture. His designs recognize both cultural and environmental relationships at the scale of the region and the site. Aronson incorporates a modern aesthetic into an ancient landscape. Lawrence Halprin, Aronson's former employer and mentor, remarks that "In many ways [Aronson's] attitudes and his process have transcended questions of detailed design. I believe his work must be judged on a far larger basis-that of concept, basic philosophy, and the significant role that landscape architecture can play in determining the character and quality, not only of Israel, but also of our world and of the future."

Another characteristic of Aronson's work is selection of plants that hark back to agricultural and religious traditions. According to Peter Jacobs, "the form and materials of Aronson's projects are derived from a careful reading of the natural and cultural history of the landscape, an understanding of the urban place as much as the rural countryside."

In 2012, Aronson planned four "healing gardens" that adjoin the new entrance pavilion of Hadassah Medical Center in Ein Karem. The gardens employ the principles of biophilic design, which posits that nature and vegetation impact positively on human health.

Besides that, Aronson made a significant and universal contribution towards planning without water. He published Aridscapes in 2008, an advocacy against water pumping as well as a global warming treatise. His pioneering work as a landscape architect was awarded a Global Award for Sustainable Architecture in 2011.

=== Landscape planning ===
- Landscape master plan for the city of Eilat
- Landscape master plan for the city of Carmiel
- Landscape master plan for the city of Nazareth
- Landscape master plan for the city of Hod HaSharon
- The Lowest Park on Earth Dead Sea
- Master plan for the Yatir Forest
- Landscape consultant for the residential extension of Beer Sheva, which will contain 25,000 housing units
- Master plan for Jerusalem's green belt
- Beit Govrin National park
- Hof Hasharon National park
- Rehabilitation plan for the 3,000-acre (12 km^{2}) "Burnt Forest" on the western approach to Jerusalem.

=== Archaeological parks ===
- Archaeological park around the southern wall of the Temple Mount in Jerusalem, preservation of antiquities, landscaping, roads and parking areas
- Kidron Valley – Tomb of Absalom, Jerusalem's "Biblical Park"
- Beit Guvrin, archaeological national park
- Caesarea- hippodrome area, the ancient port and the ancient city

=== National and regional planning ===
- National master plan of afforestation (with Motti Kaplan and Ilan Beeri)
- Master plan for the Judean Hills region
- Negev tourist development plan
- Modi'in regional master plan
- Master Plan for the entire country (one of five authors), in charge of open spaces and physical appearance

=== Urban planning ===
- Mevasseret Zion, a new suburban township (Jerusalem area), 4000 housing units
- Master plan for Jerusalem southwest
- New town near Beit Shemesh, 40,000 housing units, joint venture with architect David Reznik
- Lavon, an industrial, educational and residential complex
- Caesarea Bay, layout of four residential neighborhoods
- Beit Shemesh, new neighborhood, 2500 housing units, (with Yair Avigdor)

=== Architecture ===
- Cardo market and residential area in the Jewish Quarter
- Nes Harim swimming pool and restaurant complex in Judean Hills
- Talpiot center, 200 residential units plus 20 shops in Jerusalem
- Thirty-seven town houses in Mevaseret Zion
- Orchidea Hotel, Eilat
- Restaurant at the Jerusalem Hass Promenade with Lawrence Halprin
- Restaurant at the Jerusalem Hass Promenade with Kurtis-Groag

=== Historical preservation ===
- Dung Gate and Zion Gate, the Old City, Jerusalem
- YMCA forecourt in Jerusalem
- Abu Gosh mosque
- Shaar Hagai inn

=== Landscape architecture ===
- Sherover Promenade, Jerusalem
- Suzanne Dellal Plazas, a series of urban plazas in Neve Zedek, Tel Aviv
- Central Plaza of Ben-Gurion University – Kreitman Square
- Central Plaza for the Technion – Israel Institute of Technology in Haifa
- Central Park for the city of Eilat
- Jerusalem Central Park – Independence Park
- American Independence Park in the Judean Hills
- Ancient Roman town of Caesarea
- Jewish Quarter, Old City, Jerusalem
- Jerusalem Botanical Gardens
- Central Park for the city of Kiryat Shmona
- Sapir Park in the Negev Desert
- Central Plaza of Tel Aviv University
- Central Park of Gilo neighborhood, Jerusalem
- Hof HaSharon National Park
- Kishle Park in Nazareth
- Virgin Mary Spring in Nazareth
- Municipal square in Herzliya
- Malha Park, Jerusalem
- Trotner Park, Jerusalem
- Sherman Park, Jerusalem
- Modi'in, Valley 17, Central Business District, Industrial zone
- Castel National Park

=== Transportation and engineering ===
- Tel Aviv – Jerusalem Highway aka Highway 1 (Israel/Palestine)
- Road along the Dead Sea
- Landscape consultant for Nature Reserves Authority and Israel Defense Forces for new roads and installations in the Negev Desert
- Landscape architect for road no. 9, Jerusalem
- Landscape architect for the main trunk road of Israel, road no. 6
- Sha'ar Ha-gai interchange, town planning scheme, architecture and landscape architecture
- Ben Shemen interchange
- Kesem interchange
- Landscape architecture for the Central Garden at Ben-Gurion International Airport
- The architecture and landscape design of 18 km conveyor belt from the Dead Sea to Arad
- Landscape architect for the Negev phosphate plant, developing new quarrying methods in Nahal Zin
- Rehabilitation of the used mines in the Small Crater

=== Work outside Israel ===
- Iran – Arya Mehr – Iran National Botanical Garden, water fixtures and system, 1975
- Canada – Jerusalem garden and pavilion, Montreal Expo, 1981
- Japan – Osaka Expo, the Israeli Garden. Awards: The Best Prize, Honor Prize and two gold medals, 1990
- China – The Israeli Garden. Awards The Silver Medal for design, 1999.
- Italy – La Selva master plan for recreation and tourism, 1,200-acre (4.9 km^{2}) site next to Rome, with three pilot projects, 1990–91
- Egypt – Suma Bay master plan and landscape consultant for a 12 square kilometer resort including 19 hotels, 410 villas and an 18-hole golf course complex on the Red Sea, 1992

== Awards ==
- Ben Gurion Airport, Trans-Israel Highway
- 1989 Pfefferman Prize
- 1990 Rechter Prize
- 1990 Gold Medal and Best Design Award, Osaka Expo
- 1991 Represented Israel in the International Biennale in Venice, for Sherover Promenade
- 1991 Beautiful Israel Prize
- 1995 Designer of the Year (with David Resnik) for Mivnim for the master plan of Beit Shemesh
- 1995 Excellence in Communication, Landscape Architectural Magazine
- 1996 Represented Israel in the International Biennale in Venice, for Shaar Hagai Interchange, Nazareth
- 1998 Karavan Prize
- 1998 Architects and Town Planners Award Prize
- 1999 Silver medal for design, Kunming, China Expo
- 2000 Jerusalem Prize for Architecture
- 2001 Distinguished Alumnus Award, University of California, Berkeley
- 2005 General Design Award of Honor, American Society of Landscape Architects, for Ben Gurion International Airport, Tel Aviv, Israel
- 2011 Global Award for Sustainable Architecture [Cité de l'Architecture et du Patrimoine, Paris & Fondation LOCUS]
- 2012 Yakir Yerushalayim

== Published work ==
- Making Peace with the Land: Designing Israel's Landscape. Washington, D.C: Spacemaker Press, 1998.
- "Ben Gurion International Airport in Lod" Topos: the international review of landscape architecture and urban design 53 (2005): 60–4.
- Aridscapes. "Land&Scape Series" collection, Gustavo Gili Editions, 2008.

== Bibliography ==
- Bennett, Paul. "Habitable Image: A Network of Promenades Defines a Country's Past, Points Toward its Future [Jerusalem]." Landscape Architecture 90.5 (2000): 60–7.
- Helphand, Kenneth I. Dreaming Gardens : Landscape Architecture and the Making of Modern Israel. Santa Fe, NM: Center for American Places, 2002.
- Loon, Leehu. "Abstracting the Israeli Landscape: This Garden Well Expresses the Landscape of Israel, without Political References – Too Bad most Visitors Can't Find it." Landscape Architecture 97.3 (2007): 28, 30–2.
- Ben-Ari, Eyal, and Yoram Bilu, eds. Grasping Land: Space and Place in Contemporary Israeli Discourse and Experience. Albany: State University of New York Press, 1997.
- Flantz, Richard and Daphne Raz, eds. Point of View: Four Approaches to Landscape Architecture in Israel. Tel Aviv: The Genia Schreiber University Art Gallery Tel Aviv University, 1996.
- Selin, Helaine, ed. Nature Across Cultures: Views of Nature and the Environment in Non-Western Cultures. Dordrecht; Boston: Kluwer Academic Publishers, 2003.
