= Albert Grenier (historian) =

French historian, theologian, and archaeologist

Albert Grenier (22 April 1878, Paris – 23 June 1961, Paris) was a French historian, theologian, and archaeologist. He specialized in the history of ancient Rome and the Celts, especially the Gauls.

== Works (selection) ==
- La Gaule : province romaine.
- Le Génie romain dans la religion, la pensée et l'art, La Renaissance du Livre, Paris, 1925
- Les Gaulois, Petite bibliothèque Payot, Paris, 1970. ISBN 2-228-88838-9
- Quatre villes romaines de Rhénanie : Trèves, Mayence, Bonn, Cologne.
- Manuel d'archéologie gallo-romaine, tome 1 : Généralités et travaux militaires.
- Manuel d'archéologie gallo-romaine, tome 2 : L'Archéologie du sol, les routes, la navigation, l'occupation du sol.
