= Society of Antiquaries of Normandy =

French historical and archaeological society

- Société des antiquaires de Normandie
- Formation: 1824
- Founder: Arcisse de Caumont
- Type: Historical and archaeological society
- Purpose: Research of antiquities, studies related to national history, and the preservation of monuments in the departments of Calvados, Eure, Manche, Orne, and Seine-Maritime.
- Headquarters: Caen, Normandy, France
- Official language: French
- Publication: Bulletin de la Société des antiquaires de Normandie; Mémoires; Monuments et sites de Normandie; Grands Textes des Antiquaires
- Affiliations: Comité des travaux historiques et scientifiques Federation of Historical and Archaeological Societies of Normandy

The Society of Antiquaries of Normandy (Société des antiquaires de Normandie, in French) is a historical and archaeological society in Normandy, founded in 1824 by Arcisse de Caumont. It holds its meetings at the Hôtel d'Escoville in Caen.

== History ==
The Society of Antiquaries of Normandy is dedicated to the study of the history and archaeology of the five departments of Normandy. It has made significant contributions to the history of the Manche department. Charles de Gerville, who coined the term "Romanesque architecture," was one of its founding members.

The society has been instrumental in publishing key sources for Norman history and conducting archaeological excavations. It was recognized as a public utility in 1855 and is headquartered in Caen. Between 1854 and 1855, the society established its museum, primarily showcasing its archaeological collections, in part of the former Collège du Mont. The building and museum were partially damaged in 1944, and the collections were subsequently transferred in 1983 to the Musée de Normandie at the Château de Caen and the Gallo-Roman Museum of Vieux. The society's archives are housed at the Calvados Departmental Archives (sub-series 83 F) and are freely accessible.

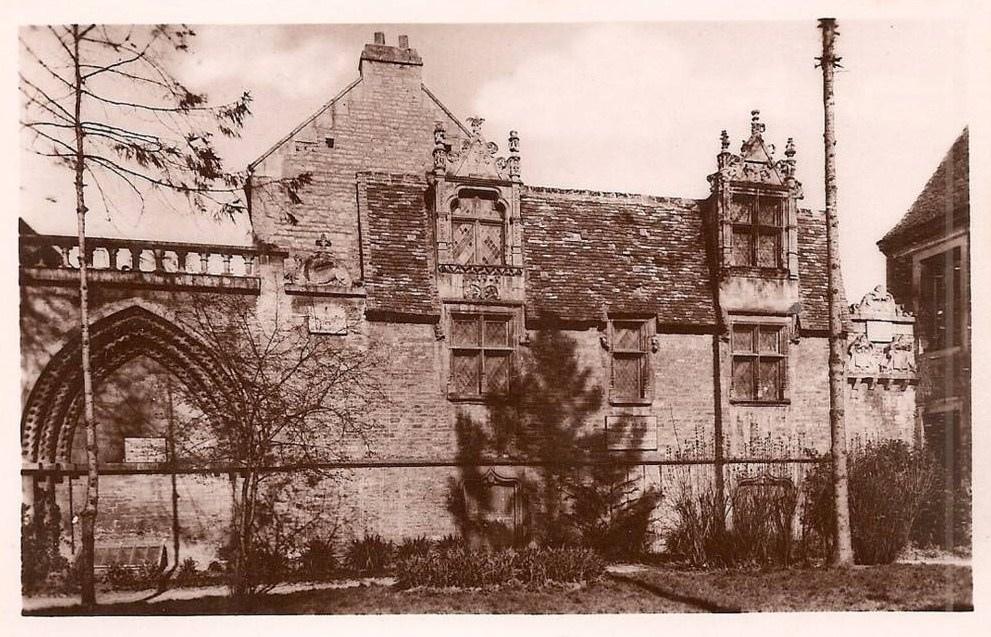
Gardens of the museum.

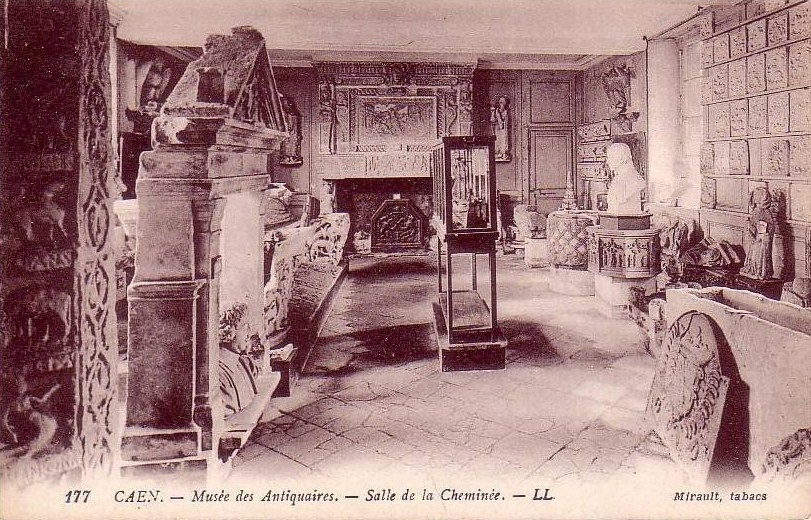
Fireplace room.

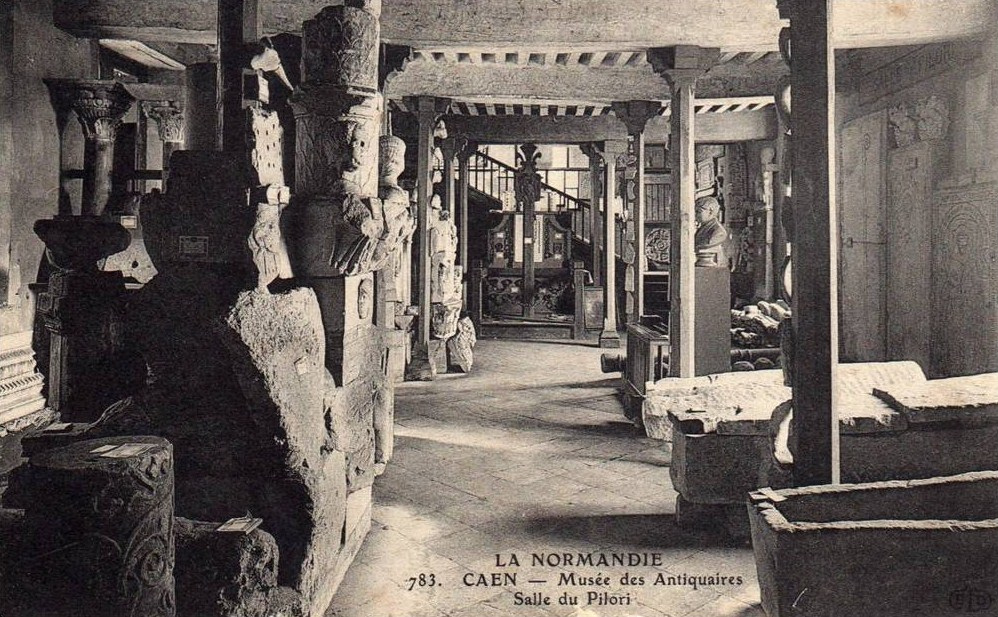
Pillory room.

== Notable members ==
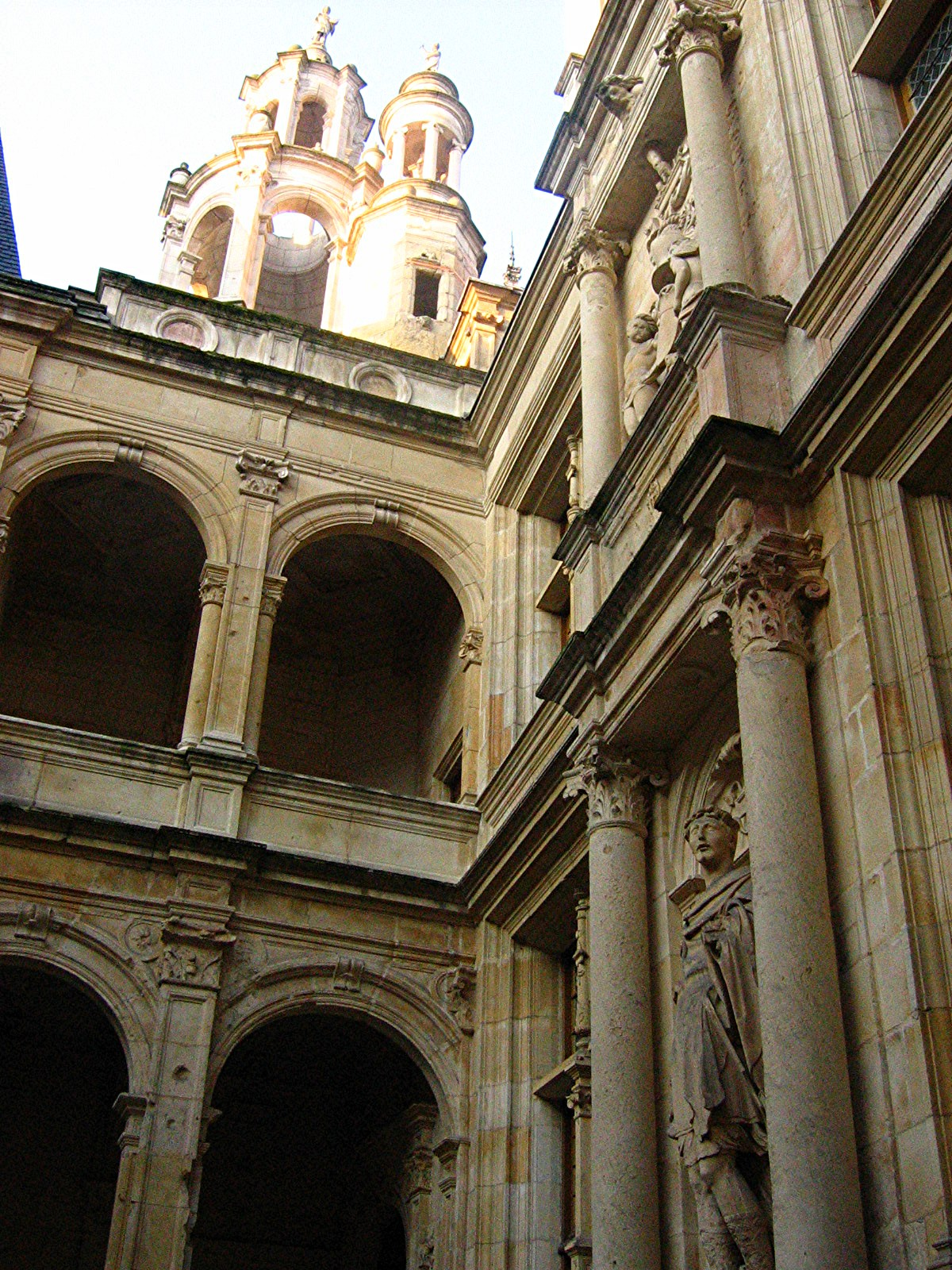
Hôtel d'Escoville, headquarters of the Société.

- Jean Adigard des Gautries
- Flavien Hugonin (1823–1898, director and honorary member, Bishop of Bayeux and Lisieux)
- Georges Bouet
- Alfred Canel
- Arcisse de Caumont
- Antoine Charma
- Jacques Fontaine
- Charles de Gerville
- Gervais de La Rue
- Charles Édouard Lambert
- Amédée Léchaudé d'Anisy
- Jacques Le Maho
- Auguste Le Prévost
- Henry Louis Martin de Villers
- Lucien Musset
- Delphine Philippe-Lemaître
- Bénigne Poret de Blosseville
- Eustache de La Quérière
- René-Norbert Sauvage
- Charles Thomine des Mazures
- Gérard de Contades
- Marie-Josèphe Le Cacheux
- Abel Vautier

== Publications ==
The society regularly publishes the Bulletin de la Société des antiquaires de Normandie, with the most recent being Volume LXXIII (2014, published in 2016). Efforts to address publication delays led to the release of Volume LXIII in 2010, with further volumes announced. Volume LXVI, covering 2004–2007, was published in 2011.

Additionally, the society has published Mémoires since its founding in 1824. The latest, Volume XLVII (2016), authored by Patrice Gourbin, focuses on "The Heritage of Caen During World War II and the Reconstruction" (320 pages).

Since the 2000s, two new collections have been launched. The first, Les grands textes des Antiquaires de Normandie, began in 2008 with a critical and expanded reissue of Les Curieuses recherches du Mont Sainct Michel by Dom Thomas Le Roy.

The second collection, Monuments et sites de Normandie, started in 2010 with a work by Étienne Faisant on the Château de Fontaine-Henry. In 2011, a second volume in this collection, covering the Saint-Sauveur-du-Marché church in Caen, was published by Étienne Faisant, Vincent Juhel, and François Saint-James. In 2013, a volume on Le Grand Doyenné d'Avranches, une résidence aristocratique au fil des siècles was authored by David Nicolas-Méry. In 2014, Julien Deshayes published a booklet on the Chapelle Saint-Germain de Querqueville and Christophe Marcheteau de Quinçay published on L'ancien hôtel de ville de Caen, disparu en 1944, séminaire des Eudistes de 1664 à 1792.

A special volume was released in 2017 to mark the bicentennial of Georges Bouet’s birth, featuring engravings published by the artist between 1844 and 1848, with general chapters by François Saint-James and Marie-Pierre Bouet, and notes by Étienne Faisant, titled Hôtels et maisons Renaissance de Caen dessinés par Georges Bouet (1817–1890).

== See also ==
- History of Caen
- Romanesque architecture
- Château de Caen
- Arcisse de Caumont
- Charles de Gerville
