= Auguste Le Prévost =

French scientist

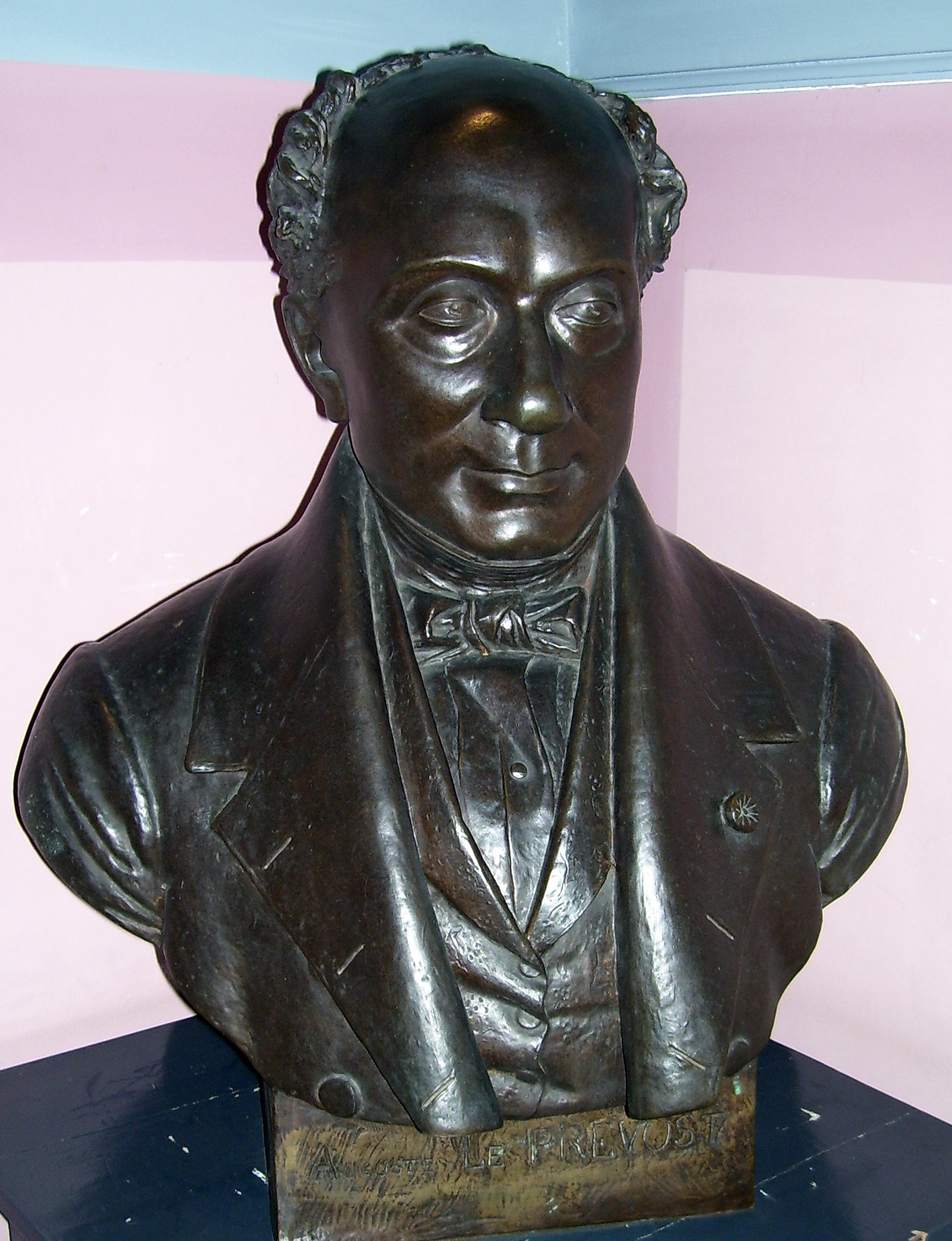
- Bust of Auguste Le Prévost by Jean-Marie Bonnassieux (museum of Bernay)
- Born: 3 June 1787; Bernay
- Died: 14 July 1859 (aged 72); La Vaupalière
- Occupations: Geologist, philologist, archaeologist and historian
- Known for: Co-pioneering research on the Romanesque and Gothic architecture in Normandy and France.

Auguste Le Prévost (3 June 1787 in Bernay, Eure – 14 July 1859 in La Vaupalière) was a French geologist, philologist, archaeologist and historian.

While studying classics and law, Le Prevost developed a passion for history and archeology. To further it, he learned, besides Latin and Greek, English, Italian, German, Swedish, Hebrew and Sanskrit. His encyclopedic knowledge, the critical and rigorous method he applied to his research, were clearly an innovation in his time. As an historian, Le Prevost pioneered, along with his friend Arcisse de Caumont, research on the Romanesque and Gothic architecture in Normandy and France. In 1824, he cofounded with de Caumont, Charles de Gerville and Father Gervais de La Rue, the Société des Antiquaires de Normandie, a veritable "school in motion of specialists of architecture". He was elected a member of the Académie des sciences, belles-lettres et arts de Rouen in 1813, and chaired, on various occasions, the learned societies of Seine-Inférieure and Eure. He was elected a member of the Académie des Inscriptions et Belles-Lettres in 1838.

Le Prévost, who was fascinated by the History of Normandy, published the five volumes of the Norman chronicler Orderic Vitalis' work. He showed his versatility by authoring, among many scientific papers, a Discours sur la poésie romantique in 1825. In 1830, he published two sets of detailed notes on the important discovery of "the treasure of Berthouville", a fabulous collection of Gallo-Roman silverware listed today among the most valuable pieces medal cabinet of the Bibliothèque nationale de France. He is responsible for the restoration of the Parlement de Normandie in Rouen and conservation of Roman theater of Lillebonne.

He began a political career with his election as general counselor in Bernay in 1831, then as deputy in 1834. He was consistently re-elected until the Orleans family fell from power after the French Revolution of 1848. he did not oppose the republic, but said humorously, "The Republic and I greet one another, but we do not talk." He then resumed scholarly activities he had never really abandoned, and earned the nickname of "Norman Pausanias". When he died in 1859, he had gone almost blind.

He is featured in Jean de La Varende's most famous novel, Leather-Nose (1936), when the hero, Roger Tainchebraye, meets "a black man feverishly measuring, looking, counting, an active and tiny insect: it was Auguste Le Prevost, the archaeologist of Bernay, semi-founder of the science that would get such a upswing" walks through the ruins of the Abbey of Saint-Evroul. Nez-de-Cuir also mentions a mysterious crypt in the abbey with "miscellaneous valuables, rings and bits of sticks, which come from a discovery made around here"...

The innumerable unpublished Notes historiques et archéologiques by Le Prevost were later published in several volumes between 1866 and 1869 by Louis Passy and Léopold Delisle. They have been widely used by generations of researchers, and are still authoritative.

Le Prévost was appointed sub-prefect of Bernay in August 1814 before he was discharged in November 1815. A street of his native town of Bernay was named after him.

== Summary Bibliography ==
- (in French) Anciennes divisions territoriales de la Normandie, Crapelet, Paris, 1837
- (in French) Architecture gallo-romaine et architecture du moyen age, Imprimerie Impériale, Paris, 1857
- (in French) Dictionnaire des anciens noms de lieux du département de l’Eure, Ancelle, Évreux, 1839
- (in French) Dictionnaire du patois normand en usage (...) dans l’Eure (avec Paul Eugène Robin et le marquis de Blosseville), Hérissey, Évreux, 1879–1882; Slatkine Reprints, Genève, 1978
- (in French) Du classique et du romantique : recueil de disçours pour et contre, lus à l'Académie royale des sciences, belles-lettres et arts de Rouen, pendant l'année 1824, Nicétas Périaux, Rouen, 1826
- (in French) Édition de : Orderic Vital, Historiae ecclesiasticae (...), 5 vol., J. Renouard, Paris, 1838–1855; Johnson Reprint, New York, 1965
- (in French) Essai sur les romances historiques du Moyen Âge, Pierre Périaux, Rouen, 1814
- (in French) Le Roman de Rou et des ducs de Normandie, Édouard Frère, Rouen, 1827
- (in French) Mémoire sur la collection de vases antiques trouvée, en mars 1830, à Berthouville, T. Chalopin, Caen, 1830
- (in French) Mémoires et notes de M. Auguste Le Prévost pour servir à l’histoire du département de l’Eure, publiées par Léopold Delisle et Antoine Passy, 3 vol., A. Hérissey, Évreux, 1862–1869
- (in French) Note sur les antiquités romaines de Serquigny, Ancelle fils, Évreux, 1830
- (in French) Notes pour servir à la topographie et à l’histoire des communes du département de l’Eure au Moyen âge, A. Hérissey, Évreux, 1849
- (in French) Notice historique et archéologique sur le département de l’Eure, Ancelle, Évreux, 1832
- (in French) Notice sur la châsse de Saint-Taurin d’Évreux, J. J. Ancelle, Évreux, 1838
- (in French) Observations philologiques et grammaticales sur le Roman de Rou : et sur quelques règles de la langue des trouvères au douzième siècle, Édouard Frère, Rouen, 1829
- (in French) Rapport sur les pièces adressées à l’Académie Royale des Sciences, Belles-Lettres et Arts de Rouen, par M. le Professeur Carl Rafn, Nicétas Périaux, Rouen, 1830
- (in French) Réflexions sur Alain Blanchard, Brière, Rouen, 1829
- (in French) Réflexions sur les antiquités des départements de l'Eure et de la Seine-Inférieure, et notamment sur les restes d'Agnès Sorel, Académie de Rouen, Rouen, 1815
- (in French) Réponse à l’écrit de M. Letronne intitulé : « Examen critique du prétendu cœur de saint Louis », 1844
- (in French) Supplément aux notes historiques sur le "Roman de Rou", Rouen, Édouard Frère, 1829
- (in French) Sur la poésie romantique, Pierre Périaux, Rouen, 1825
- The Conquest of England, from Wace's poem of the Roman de Rou, [s.n.], Londres, 1860

Numerous articles in the journals of various learned societies.
