= Paul Lacombe =

Paul Lacombe may refer to:

- Paul Lacombe (composer) (1837–1927), Languedocien (French) composer and pianist
- Paul Lacombe (basketball) (born 1990), French basketball player
- Paul Lacombe (historian) (1834–1919), French historian and archivist

== See also ==
- Paul Lacôme (1838–1920), French composer
