= Théophile Homolle =

French archaeologist and hellenist (1848–1925)

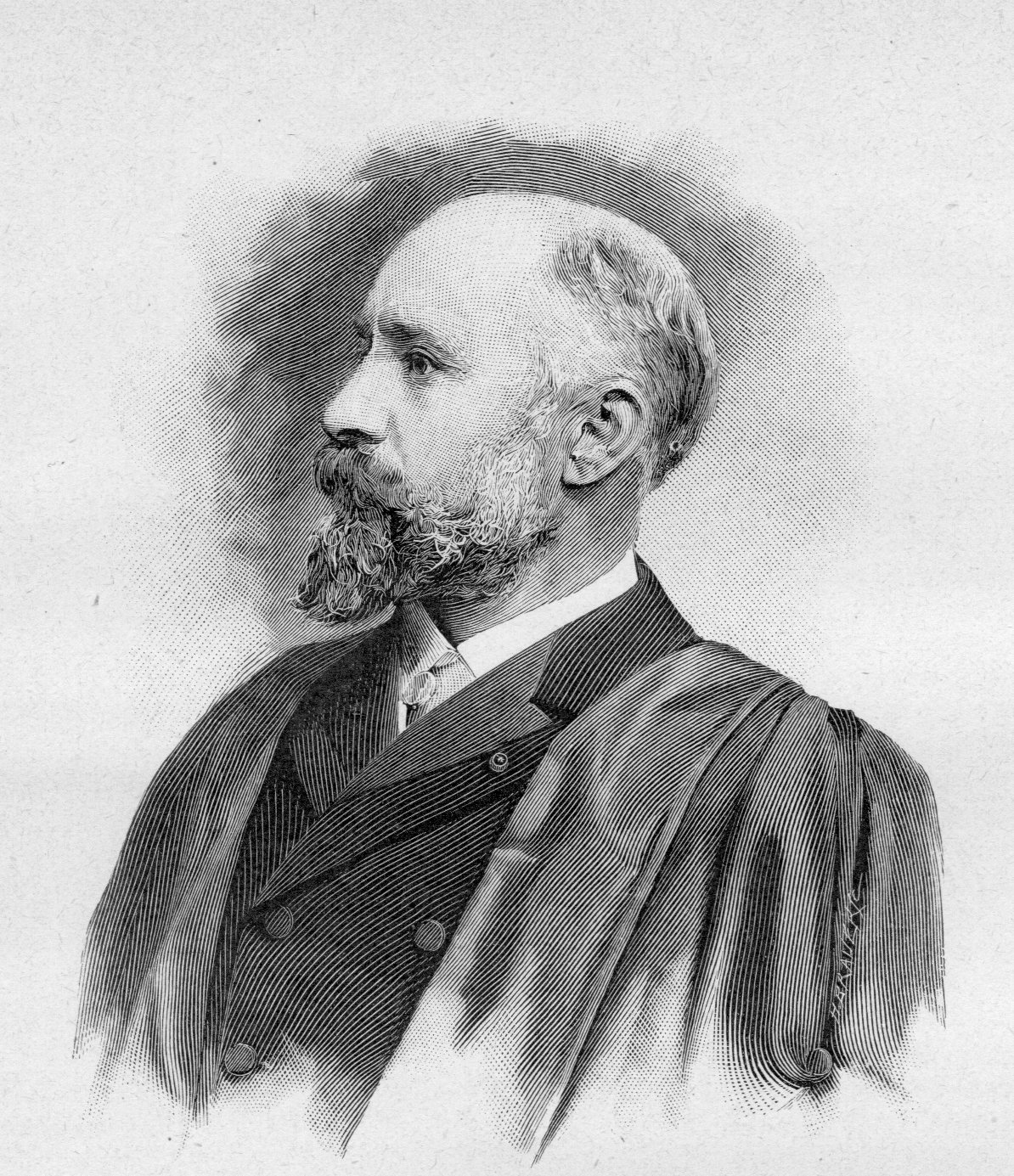
Théophile Homolle

Jean Théophile Homolle (19 December 1848, Paris – 13 June 1925, Paris) was a French archaeologist and classical philologist.

== Biography ==
From 1869 he studied at the École Normale Supérieure in Paris, receiving his agrégation for history in 1874. He then became a member of the French School at Athens, of which, he directed a highly successful excavation at Delos (from 1877). For several years he taught classes in ancient Greek and Latin at the University of Nancy, and in 1884 became a substitute professor for Paul Foucart at Collège de France.

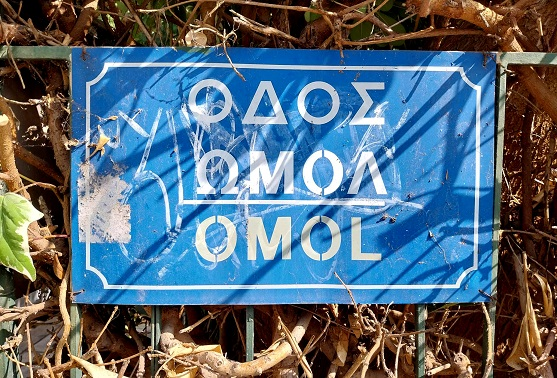
“Omol Street” in Athens, named after Théophile Homolle.

From 1891 to 1903 he served as director of the French School at Athens, during which time, he was in charge of an important excavation at Delphi. From 1904 to 1911 he was director of national museums (Louvre), but was forced to relinquish this position due to the theft of the Mona Lisa in August 1911. After a brief stay at Athens, he returned to Paris, where from 1913 to 1923, he was director of the Bibliothèque nationale de France (National Library of France).

== Selected works ==
- "Statues trouvées à Délos". Bulletin de Correspondance Hellénique, 3 (1879), p. 99-110.
- "Comptes des hiéropes d'Apollon Délien", Bulletin de correspondance hellénique, 6 (1882), p. 1-167.
- "Les Romains à Délos", Bulletin de correspondance hellénique 8 (1884), p. 75-158.
- Les Archives de l'intendance sacrée à Délos (315-166 avant J.-C.). Paris: E. Thorin, 1887.
- "Comptes et Inventaires des temples déliens en l'année 279", Bulletin de correspondance hellénique 14, 1890, p. 389-511; 15, 1891, p. 113-168.
- Ab Urbe Condita Libri XXIII-XXV et XXVI-XXX. (edition of Livy, 2nd edition) with notes, commentary, index, maps and plans, with Othon Riemann. Paris: Hachette, 1891, 2 volumes.
- "Topographie de Delphes", Bulletin de correspondance hellénique 21 (1897), p. 256-320.
- "L'Aurige de Delphes". Monuments et Mémoires de la fondation Eugène Piot 4, 2, 1898.
- "Monuments figurés de Delphes. Les fouilles du temple d'Apollon", Bulletin de correspondance hellénique 25 (1901), p. 457-515; 26, p. 587-639.
- "L'Origine du chapiteau corinthien", Revue archéologique 2 (1916), p. 17-60.
- "L'Origine des Cariatides", Revue archéologique 2, (1917), p. 1-67.

Preceded by Henry Marcel	Administrator of the Bibliothèque nationale de France; 1913–1923	Succeeded by Pierre-René Roland-Marcel
