= Henri Goelzer =

French classical philologist (1853–1929)

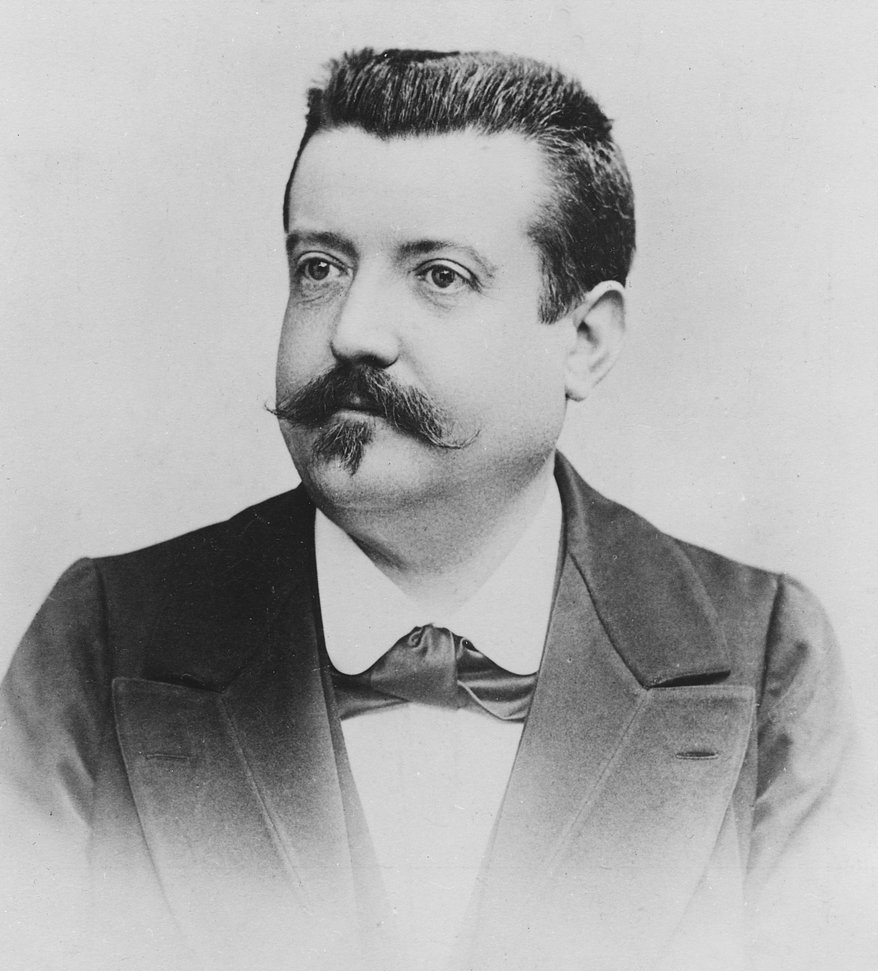
- Born: 29 September 1853; Beaumont-le-Roger, Normandy, France
- Died: 1 August 1929 (aged 75); Esprels, Bourgogne-Franche-Comté, France

Academic background
- Education: University of Paris
- Thesis: Grammaticae in Sulpicium Severum observationes (1883)

Henri Goelzer (29 September 1853, Beaumont-le-Roger – 1 August 1929, Esprels) was a French classical philologist.

In 1883 he obtained his doctorate at Paris with a dissertation-thesis on Sulpicius Severus, titled "Grammaticae in Sulpicium Severum observationes potissimum ad vulgarem latinum sermonem pertinentes". Later on his career, he became a professor of grammar and philology at the University of Paris. He served as director of the Association Guillaume Budé, and in 1923 was elected a member of the Académie des Inscriptions et Belles Lettres.

== Literary works ==
He is remembered for his editions of Tacitus — Histoires (1921), Dialogue des orateurs. Vie d'agricola. La Germanie (1922), Annales (1923) and of Virgil — Enéide (1915), Les bucoliques (1925), Géorgiques (1926). With Eugène Benoist, he was the author of a Latin-French dictionary that was published over many editions:

- Nouveau dictionnaire latin-francais, rédigé d'après les meilleurs travaux de lexicographie latine et particulièrement d'après les grands dictionnaires de Forcellini, de Georges, de Freund et de Klotz – New Latin-French dictionary written according to the best works of Latin lexicography published in France and abroad, and especially after the great dictionaries of Egidio Forcellini, Karl Ernst Georges, Wilhelm Freund and Reinhold Klotz.

Other noteworthy writings by Goelzer include:

- Étude lexicographique et grammaticale de la latinité de saint Jérôme, (1884) – Lexicographical and grammatical study on the Latin of St. Jerome.
- Grammaire comparée du grec et du latin (with Othon Riemann) 2 volumes, (1897-1901) – Comparative grammar of Greek and Latin.
- Le latin de saint Avit, évêque de Vienne (450?-526?), (1909) – The Latin of Avitus of Vienne.
