= Charles-Alexis-Adrien Duhérissier de Gerville =

- Born: 19 September 1769; Gerville-la-Forêt (Manche)
- Died: 26 July 1853 (aged 83); Valognes (Manche)
- Occupations: antiquarian, historian, naturalist, archaeologist

Charles-Alexis-Adrien Duhérissier de Gerville (Gerville-la-Forêt (Manche) 19 September 1769 — Valognes (Manche) 26 July 1853) was a scholarly French antiquarian, historian, naturalist and archaeologist from an aristocratic family of Normandy. His earliest concerns were with natural history and botany and his numismatic collection, but he became one of the small group forming the first architectural historians in France.

== Biography ==
His early studies were at the college of Coutances, followed by studies in the law at Caen. With the outbreak of the French Revolution, he joined other aristocratic émigrés, travelled in England and fought in the First Coalition or "Army of the Princes" and did not return until 1801, when he settled once again on his family estates at Gerville in Normandy and devoted his leisure to pursuing the local history of the Cotentin, from an antiquarian point of view. In 1811 he moved to Valognes (Manche), pursuing botanical field research and the nascent field of geology, and searching out ancient written materials that cast light on local history, while he undertook, from 1814 onwards, to compile a pioneering inventory of some four or five hundred churches of La Manche (Noell 2005); some of these materials were published as Voyage archéologique dans la Manche (1818–1820). He and his fellow members in the Société des Antiquaires de Normandie, founded in 1824 – the abbé Gervais de la Rue in Rouen, Auguste Le Prévost and Arcisse de Caumont – virtually formed a "travelling school of architectural connoisseurship" (Noell).

In 1818 Duhérissier de Gerville used the expression ‘'romane’'— though in the sense of Romance languages— in a letter to Auguste Le Prévost; Gerville's friend Arcisse de Caumont is more correctly accorded the honour of publicly applying, in French, the label Romane, i.e. "Romanesque" style to architecture of the eleventh and twelfth centuries, in his Essaie sur l'architecture du moyen âge, particulièrement en Normandie, 1824. In fact the OED cites first uses in English of 1715 about the languages, and 1819 about the architectural style. It was a more inclusive, European term for the massive round-arched style that had been recognized in Norman work in England, where the term "Norman architecture" was first used in 1817 by the antiquarian Thomas Rickman, in his published essay An Attempt to Discriminate the Styles of English Architecture from the Conquest to the Reformation: English architectural historians long retained the term "Norman" for that version of the Romanesque.

Duhérissier de Gerville was a correspondent of the Académie des Inscriptions et Belles-Lettres. He encouraged a local man of Valognes, Léopold Victor Delisle by engaging him to copy manuscripts in his collection, and taught him enough of the basics of paleography that he was able to gain entrance to the École des Chartres in 1846, and pursue a distinguished scholarly career at the Bibliothèque nationale; he was a member of the general council for the département of La Manche, but withdrew at the time of the Revolution of 1830 and, a confirmed legitimist like others of the Antiquaires de la Normandie, refused the cross of the Légion d'honneur offered him under Louis Philippe I.

Gerville published papers and antiquarian notes on the towns and Roman roads of the Cotentin peninsula, on Merovingian studies, and on Mont-Saint-Michel, which were collected as Études géographiques et historiques sur le département de la Manche, (Cherbourg 1854). Part of his rich collection of manuscripts he bequeathed to the archives of La Manche, and part to his protégé Léopold Delisle.

Duhérissier de Gerville is very likely to have been intended as the person honoured in the gastropod name Mitrella gervillii (Payraudeau 1826). The Devonian coral Calceola gervillei (now known to belong to the genus Rhizophyllum) was similarly very likely to have named for him by Bayle (1878) although Bayle's material was collected by de Verneuil.
