= Abel Vautier =

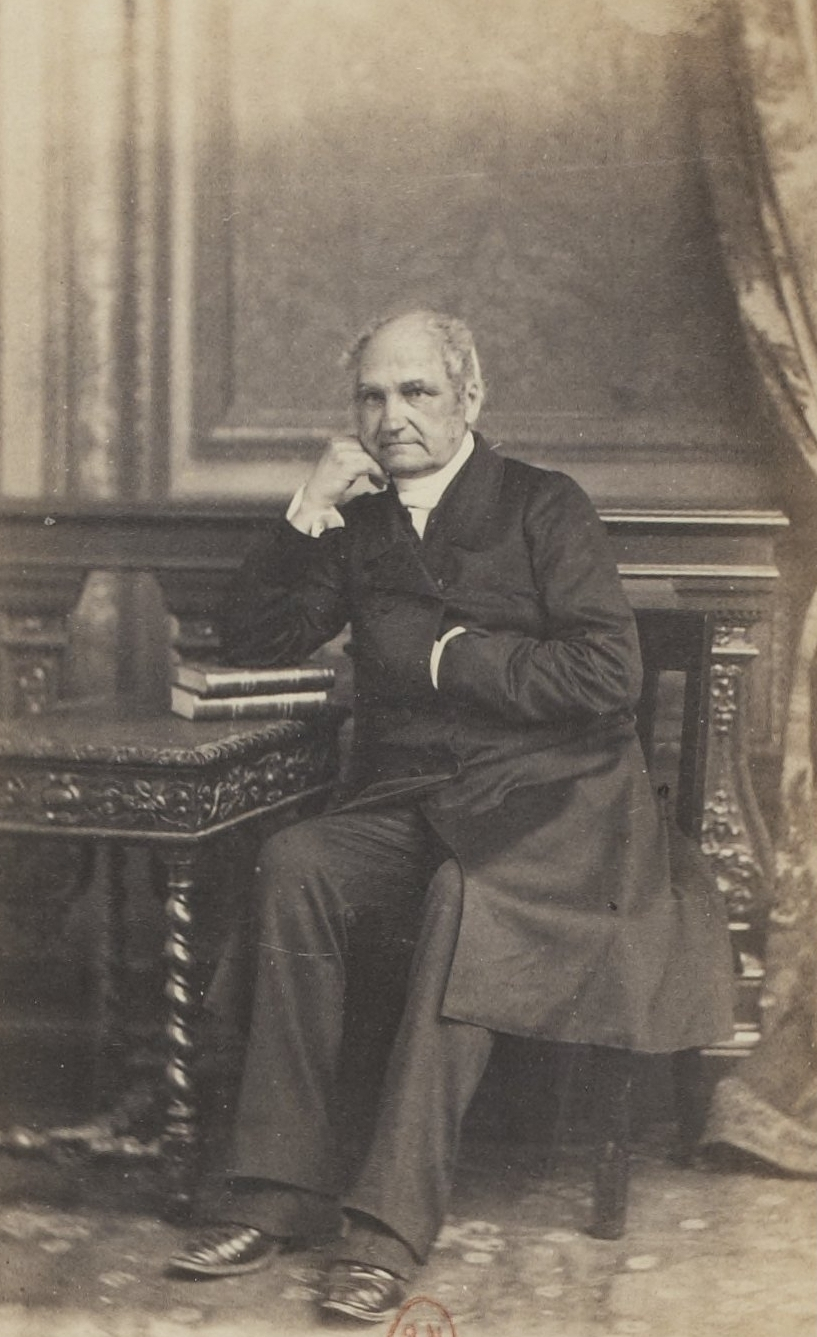
Vautier in an album of portraits of members of the Legislative Corps.

Félix Abel Vautier (3 June 1794 - 19 February 1863) was a French politician, elected member of parliament for Calvados department several times.

== Life ==
Born in Caen, he and his elder brother Urbain (born 1792) came from an old middle-class family of merchants based in that city. Their father Gabriel Urbain Vautier was an ironmonger and arms dealer, marrying Claire Françoise Le Creps on 22 October 1783 in Saint-Michel church in the Vaucelles district of Caen.

On their father's death in 1826 the two brothers took over the flourishing family business of ironmongery and coal selling. Succeeding his brother, Abel entered Caen's chamber of commerce and industry, of which he was made president. He was also president of the tribunal of commerce. Sometime between 1836 and 1840 one of the family business's ships brought in the first-ever specimen of Gervais's beaked whale.

In 1840 he was elected to the General Counci for Calvados. He first stood for parliament in 1842, but was beaten. He stood again in 1846 and was elected in Calvados's 1st constituency for the Conservatives close to the governing party led by François Guizot. He did not attend parliament during the French Second Republic. In 1848 he came out in support of Louis-Eugène Cavaignac.

He had a tract dated 9 December 1848 addressed to the workers of Calvados printed and distributed, encouraging them to vote for Cavaignac as "the Saviour of the Fatherland" against Louis-Napoléon Bonaparte, "the ridiculous hero of Strasbourg and Boulogne". Vautier stood at the elections for the national legislative assembly in May 1849, but was not re-elected. He backed the Second French Empire and thus was able to present himself as the 'official candidate' for Calvados' 1st constituency in February 1852. He was re-elected in 1857 and then held his seat until his death.

As part of his work in parliament Vautier backed several major building projects aimed at improving Calvados' economic development, particularly the cutting of the Caen Canal (opened in 1857) and building the Mantes-la-Jolie–Cherbourg railway (opened as far as Caen in 1855 and as far as Cherbourg in 1858). He was made a knight of the Legion of Honour on 31 July 1843 and was a member of:

- the Académie des sciences, arts et belles-lettres de Caen ;
- the Société d'agriculture et de commerce de Caen, of which he was president from 1839 to 1840 ;
- the Société des antiquaires de Normandie, of which he was president in 1863 ;
- the Société des beaux-arts de Caen, being its vice-president between 1861 and 1863 ;
- the Société linnéenne de Normandie from 1848.

When his activities made it impossible to leave Paris, Vautier stayed at 29 Rue d'Enfer (starting in 1847 at the latest et jusqu'en 1858). In the 1860 Almanach(prepared in 1859) he is shown at number 53 on the same street in the 5th arrondissement of Paris, where he died in 1863.

== External links (in French) ==
- https://www.leonore.archives-nationales.culture.gouv.fr/ui/notice/320
- http://www.assemblee-nationale.fr/sycomore/fiche.asp?num_dept=9165
