= Gabriel Marcel =

French philosopher, playwright and music critic (1889–1973)

- Marcel in 1951
- Born: Gabriel Honoré Marcel; 7 December 1889; Paris, France
- Died: 8 October 1973 (aged 83); Paris, France
- Spouse: Jacqueline Boegner (m. 1919; died 1947)
- Children: 1 (adopted)
- Relatives: Henry Marcel (father)

Education
- Education: University of Paris (MA, 1910)
- Academic advisor: Henri Bergson

Philosophical work
- Era: 20th-century philosophy
- Region: Western philosophy
- School: Continental; Christian existentialism; existential phenomenology; personalism
- Notable students: Paul Ricœur
- Main interests: Ontology; subjectivity; ethics
- Notable works: The Mystery of Being (1951)
- Notable ideas: "The Other" (autrui), concrete philosophy (philosophie concrète), being vs. having as opposing ways of defining the human person

Signature
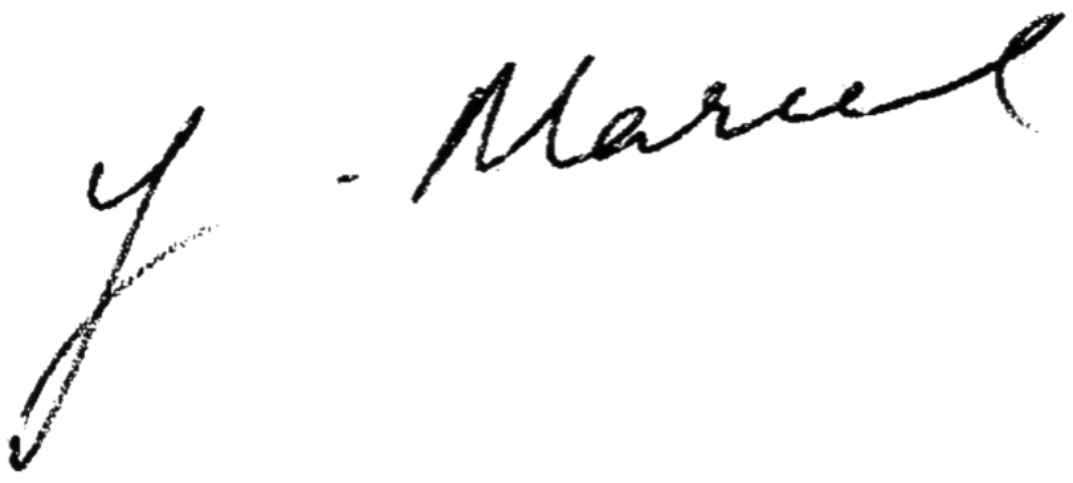

Gabriel Honoré Marcel (Note: Pronounced /mɑːrˈsɛl/ mar-SEL; French: [ɡabʁijɛl ɔnɔʁe maʁsɛl].) (7 December 1889 – 8 October 1973) was a French philosopher, playwright, music critic and leading Christian existentialist. The author of over a dozen books and at least thirty plays, Marcel's work focused on the modern individual's struggle in a technologically dehumanizing society. Though often regarded as the first French existentialist, he dissociated himself from figures such as Jean-Paul Sartre, preferring the term philosophy of existence or neo-Socrateanism to define his own thought. The Mystery of Being is a well-known two-volume work authored by Marcel.

== Early life and education ==
Gabriel Honoré Marcel was born on 7 December 1889 in Paris, France. His mother, Laure Meyer, who was Jewish, died when he was young, and he was brought up by his aunt and father, Henry Marcel.

Marcel completed his DES thesis (Note: The title of his 1910 thesis was Coleridge et Schelling (Coleridge and Schelling). It was published in 1971 (see Jeanne Parain-Vial, Gabriel Marcel: un veilleur et un éveilleur, L'Âge d'Homme, 1989, p. 12).) (diplôme d'études supérieures, roughly equivalent to an MA thesis) and obtained the agrégation in philosophy from the Sorbonne in 1910, at the unusually young age of 20. During the First World War he worked as head of the Information Service, organized by the Red Cross to convey news of injured soldiers to their families. He taught in secondary schools, was a drama critic for various literary journals, and worked as an editor for Plon, the major French Catholic publisher.

Marcel was the son of an agnostic, and was himself not a member of any organized religion until his conversion to Catholicism in 1929.

He died on 8 October 1973 in Paris.

== Existential themes ==
He is often classified as one of the earliest existentialists, although he dreaded being placed in the same category as Jean-Paul Sartre; Marcel came to prefer the label neo-Socratic (possibly because of Søren Kierkegaard, the father of Christian existentialism, who was a neo-Socratic thinker himself). While Marcel recognized that human interaction often involved objective characterisation of "the other", he still asserted the possibility of "communion" – a state where both individuals can perceive each other's subjectivity.

In The Existential Background of Human Dignity, Marcel refers to a play he had written in 1913 entitled Le Palais de Sable, in order to provide an example of a person who was unable to treat others as subjects.

Roger Moirans, the central character of the play, is a politician, a conservative who is dedicated to defending the rights of Catholicism against free thought. He has set himself up as the champion of traditional monarchy and has just achieved a great success in the city council, where he has attacked the secularism of public schools. It is natural enough that he should be opposed to the divorce of his daughter Therese, who wants to leave her unfaithful husband and start her life afresh. In this instance, he proves himself virtually heartless; all his tenderness goes out to his second daughter, Clarisse, whom he takes to be spiritually very much like himself. But now Clarisse tells him that she has decided to take the veil and become a Carmelite. Moirans is horrified by the idea that this creature, so lovely, intelligent, and full of life, might go and bury herself in a convent and he decides to do his utmost to make her give up her intention... Clarisse is deeply shocked; her father now appears to her as an impostor, virtually as a deliberate fraud...

In this case, Moirans is unable to treat either of his daughters as a subject, instead rejecting both because each does not conform to her objectified image in his mind. Marcel notes that such objectification "does no less than denude its object of the one thing which he has which is of value, and so it degrades him effectively."

Another related major thread in Marcel was the struggle to protect one's subjectivity from annihilation by modern materialism and a technologically-driven society. Marcel argued that scientific egoism replaces the "mystery" of being with a false scenario of human life composed of technical "problems" and "solutions". For Marcel, the human subject cannot exist in the technological world, instead being replaced by a human object. As he points out in Man Against Mass Society and other works, technology has a privileged authority with which it persuades the subject to accept his place as "he" in the internal dialogue of science; and as a result, man is convinced by science to rejoice in his own annihilation.

== Influence ==
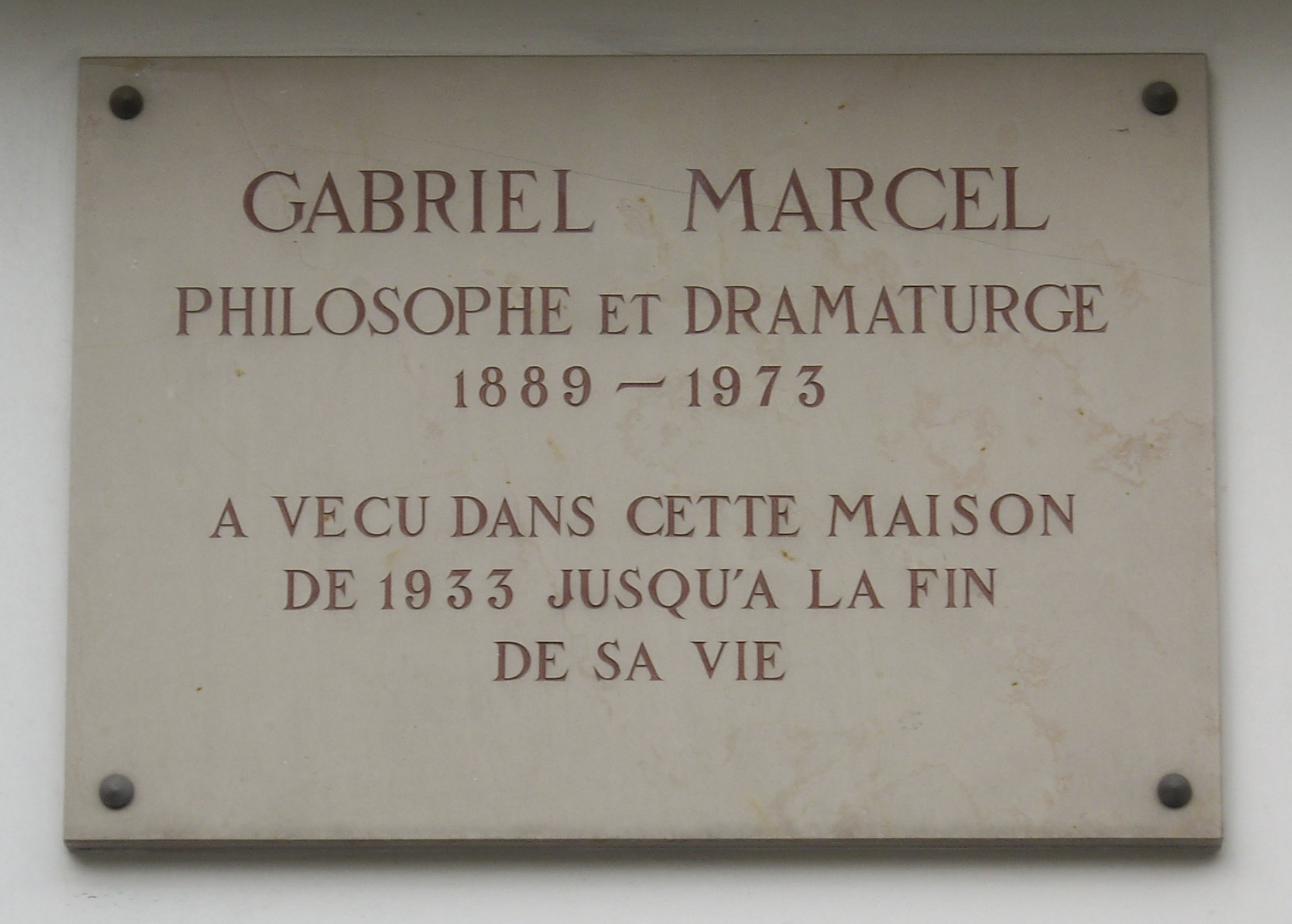
Plaque at the home where Marcel resided from 1933 until his death

For many years, Marcel hosted a weekly philosophy discussion group through which he met and influenced important younger French philosophers such as Jean Wahl, Paul Ricœur, Emmanuel Levinas, and Jean-Paul Sartre. Marcel was puzzled and disappointed that his reputation was almost entirely based on his philosophical treatises and not on his plays, which he wrote in the hope of appealing to a wider lay audience. He also influenced phenomenologist and Thomistic philosopher Karol Wojtyla (later Pope John Paul II), who drew on Marcel's distinction between "being" and "having" in his critique of technological change.

=== Main works ===
Marcel's major books are the Metaphysical Journal (1927), Being and Having (1933), Homo Viator (1945), and Man Against Mass Society (1955). He gave the Gifford Lectures at the University of Aberdeen between 1949 and 1950, which were published as The Mystery of Being (1951). He also gave the William James Lectures at Harvard in 1961–1962, which were subsequently published as The Existential Background of Human Dignity.

== Works in English translation ==
- 1948. The Philosophy of Existence. Manya Harari, trans. London: The Harvill Press. Later editions were titled The Philosophy of Existentialism.
- 1949. Being and Having. Katherine Farrer, trans. Westminster, London: Dacre Press.
- 1950. The Metaphysical Journal. Bernard Wall, trans. Chicago: Henry Regnery Company.
- 1951. The Mystery of Being, Vol. 1, Reflection and Mystery trans. G. S. Fraser; Vol. 2, Faith and Reality. trans. René Hague London: The Harvill Press.
- 1956. Royce's Metaphysics. Virginia and Gordon Ringer, trans. Chicago: Henry Regnery Company.
- 1962. Man Against Mass Society. G. S. Fraser, trans. Chicago: Henry Regnery Company.
- 1962. Homo Viator: Introduction to a Metaphysic of Hope. Emma Craufurd, trans. Harper & Brothers.
- 1963. The Existential Background of Human Dignity. Harvard University Press.
- 1964. Creative Fidelity. Translated, with an introduction, by Robert Rosthal. Farrar, Straus and Company.
- 1967. Presence and Immortality. Michael A. Machado, trans. Pittsburgh: Duquesne University Press.
- 1967. Problematic Man. Brian Thompson, trans. New York: Herder and Herder.
- 1973. Tragic Wisdom and Beyond. Stephen Jolin and Peter McCormick, trans. Publication of the Northwestern University Studies in Phenomenology and Existential Philosophy, ed. John Wild. Northwestern University Press.
- 1984. " An Autobiographical Essay," and "Replies," in The Philosophy of Gabriel Marcel (Library of Living Philosophers). Paul Arthur Schilpp and Lewis Edwin Hahn, eds. La Salle, IL: Open Court.
- 1998. Gabriel Marcel's Perspectives on The Broken World: The Broken World, a Four-Act Play, Followed by Concrete Approaches to Investigating the Ontological Mystery. Katharine Rose Hanley, trans. Milwaukee: Marquette University Press.
- 2002. Awakenings. Peter Rogers, trans. Milwaukee: Marquette University Press.
- 2004. Ghostly Mysteries: Existential Drama: A Mystery of Love & The Posthumous Joke. Katharine Rose Hanley, trans. Milwaukee: Marquette University Press.
- 2008. A Path to Peace: Fresh Hope for the World. Dramatic Explorations: Five Plays by Gabriel Marcel: The Heart of Others/Dot the I/The Double Expertise/The Lantern/Colombyre or The Torch of Peace. Katharine Rose Hanley, trans. Milwaukee: Marquette University Press.
- 2009. Thou Shall Not Die. Compiled by Anne Marcel. Katharine Rose Hanley, trans. South Bank: St Augustine's Press.
- 2019. The Invisible Threshold: Two Plays by Gabriel Marcel. Brendan Sweetman, Maria Traub, Geoffrey Karabin, eds. Maria Traub, trans. South Bank: St Augustine's Press.
- 2021. Thirst. Michial Farmer, trans. Providence, RI: Cluny Media.

== Bibliography ==
=== Philosophical works ===
- Existence et Objectivité (1914).
- Journal métaphysique (1914–1923), Paris, Gallimard, 1927.
- Être et avoir (1918–1933). Paris, Aubier, 1935.
- Du refus à l'invocation, Paris, Gallimard, 1940. (Republished in 1967 under the title Essai de philosophie concrète, Paris, NRF/Gallimard, 1967)
- Homo viator. Prolégomènes à une métaphysique de l'espérance. Paris, Aubier, 1945
- La Métaphysique de Royce. Paris, Aubier, 1945
- Position et Approches concrètes du mystère ontologique, introduction by Marcel de Corte. Louvain, E. Nauwelaerts; Paris, Librairie philosophique J. Vrin, 1949
- Le Mystère de l'être. Paris, Aubier, 1951, 2 volumes.
- Les Hommes contre l'humain, Paris, La Colombe, 1951, Republished: Fayard, 1968
- Le Déclin de la sagesse. Paris, Plon, 1954
- L'Homme problématique. Paris, Aubier, 1955
- Théâtre et Religion. Lyon, Éditions E. Vitte, 1958
- Présence et Immortalité. Paris, Flammarion, 1959
- La Dignité humaine et ses assises existentielles. Paris, Aubier, 1964
- Entretiens Paul Ricœur, Gabriel Marcel. Paris, Aubier, 1968, Republished: présence de Gabriel Marcel, 1999
- Pour une sagesse tragique et son au-delà. Paris, Plon, 1968
- En chemin, vers quel éveil? Paris, Gallimard, 1971
- Coleridge et Schelling. Paris, Aubier, 1971
- Plus décisif que la violence. Paris, Plon, 1971
- Percées vers un ailleurs. Fayard, 1973
- Gabriel Marcel interrogé par Pierre Boutang suivi de Position et approches concrètes du mystère ontologique. Paris, J.-M. Place Éditeur, 1977
- Tu ne mourras pas, textes choisis et présentés by Anne Marcel, preface by Xavier Tilliette, éditions Arfuyen, 2005.

=== Theater ===
- Le Cœur des autres. Paris, Grasset, 1921
- L'Iconoclaste. Paris, Stock, 1923
- Un homme de Dieu. Paris, Grasset, 1925
- La Chapelle ardente (1925), directed by Gaston Baty, Théâtre du Vieux-Colombier.
- Le Monde cassé suivi de Position et approches concrètes du mystère ontologique. Paris, Desclée de Brouwer, 1933.
- Chemin de Crète, Paris, Grasset, 1936 - Prix Paul-Hervieu of the Académie française .
- Le Dard. Paris, Plon, 1936
- Le Fanal. Paris, Stock, 1936
- La Soif. Paris, Desclée de Brouwer, 1938, republished under the title of Les cœurs avides, La Table Ronde, 1952
- Théâtre comique: Colombyre ou le brasier de la paix - La double expertise - Les points sur les i - Le divertissement posthume. Paris, Albin Michel, 1947
- Vers un autre Royaume: L'émissaire - Le signe de la croix. Paris, Plon, 1949
- Rome n'est plus dans Rome, Paris, La Table Ronde, 1951
- Croissez et multipliez. Paris, Plon, 1955
- Mon temps n'est pas le vôtre. Paris, Plon, 1955
- La Dimension Florestan suivi de la conférence Le Crépuscule du sens commun. Paris, Plon, 1958

=== Literary and dramatic criticism ===
- Gabriel Marcel et François Mauriac. In : François Bréda, Ca critique littéraire et dramatique de Gabriel Marcel, Les Éditions Grinta, Cluj-Napoca, 2004.
- Regards sur le théâtre de Claudel, éditions Beauchesne, 1964.

== See also ==
- Moral Re-Armament
