= The Mystery of Being =

1951 book by Gabriel Marcel

- Cover of the first volume
- Author: Gabriel Marcel
- Original title: Le Mystère de l'être
- Translator: G. S. Fraser
- Language: French
- Subject: Being
- Published: 1951
- Publication place: France
- Media type: Print

The Mystery of Being (French: Le Mystère de l'être) is a two-volume book of existential philosophy by Gabriel Marcel. The two volumes are, "Reflection and Mystery" and "Faith and Reality". First published in 1951, the book is a collection of Gifford Lectures given by Marcel while at the University of Aberdeen between 1949 and 1950.
