= Othon Riemann =

French classical philologist (1853–1891)

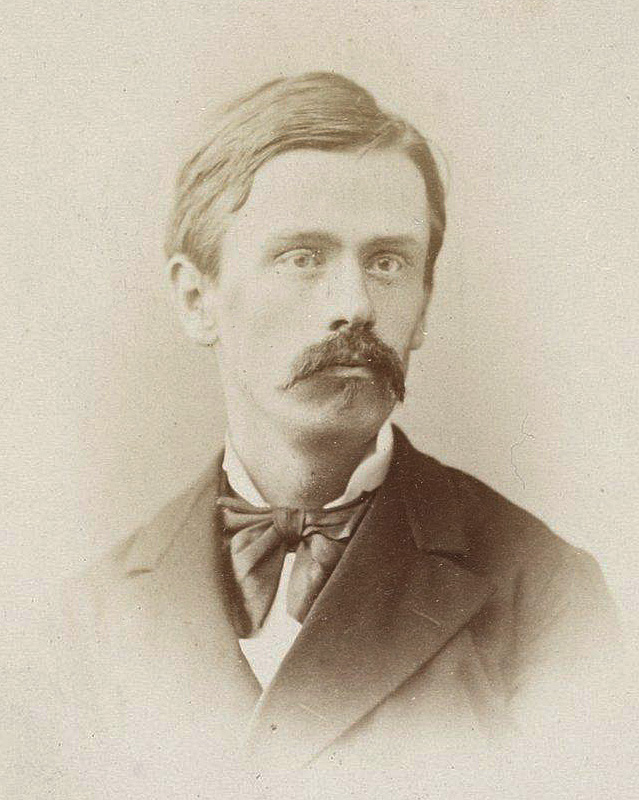
Othon Riemann

Othon Riemann (13 June 1853, in Nancy – 16 August 1891, in Interlaken) was a French classical philologist and archaeologist.

He studied at the École Normale Supérieure (ENS) in Paris, and in 1874 became a member of the École française d'Athènes (French School of Athens). While a member, he visited various libraries in Italy, during which he collated manuscripts of Livy. He then conducted archaeological research of the Ionian Islands, about which, he produced a massive report. After returning to France, he taught classes in grammar in his hometown of Nancy.

In 1880 he became an editor of the "Revue de philologie, de littérature et d'histoire anciennes", and during the following year, attained the chair of grammar at the École Normale Supérieure. From 1885 he taught classes at the École pratique des hautes études, while still maintaining his post at the ENS. He died on August 16, 1871 (age 38) from the effects of a fall on the Morgenberg, located near Interlaken, Switzerland.

== Selected works ==
- Études sur la langue et la grammaire de Tite-Live, 1879 – Studies on the language and grammar of Livy.
- Qua rei criticae tractandae ratione Hellenicon Xenophontis (edition of Xenophon), 1879.
- Recherches archéologiques sur les îles ioniennes, 1879-80 – Archaeological research on the Ionian islands.
- Titi Livii ab urbe condita. Libri XXI et XXII (as editor, with Eugène Benoist), 1881.
- Syntaxe latine d'après les principes de la grammaire historique, 1886 – Latin syntax according to the principles of historical grammar.
- Traité de rhythmique & de métrique grecques, (with Médéric Dufour) 1893 – Treatise on Greek rhythm and meter.
- Grammaire comparée du grec et du latin. Syntaxe (with Henri Goelzer), 1897 – Comparative grammar of Greek and Latin; syntax.
