= Henry Marcel =

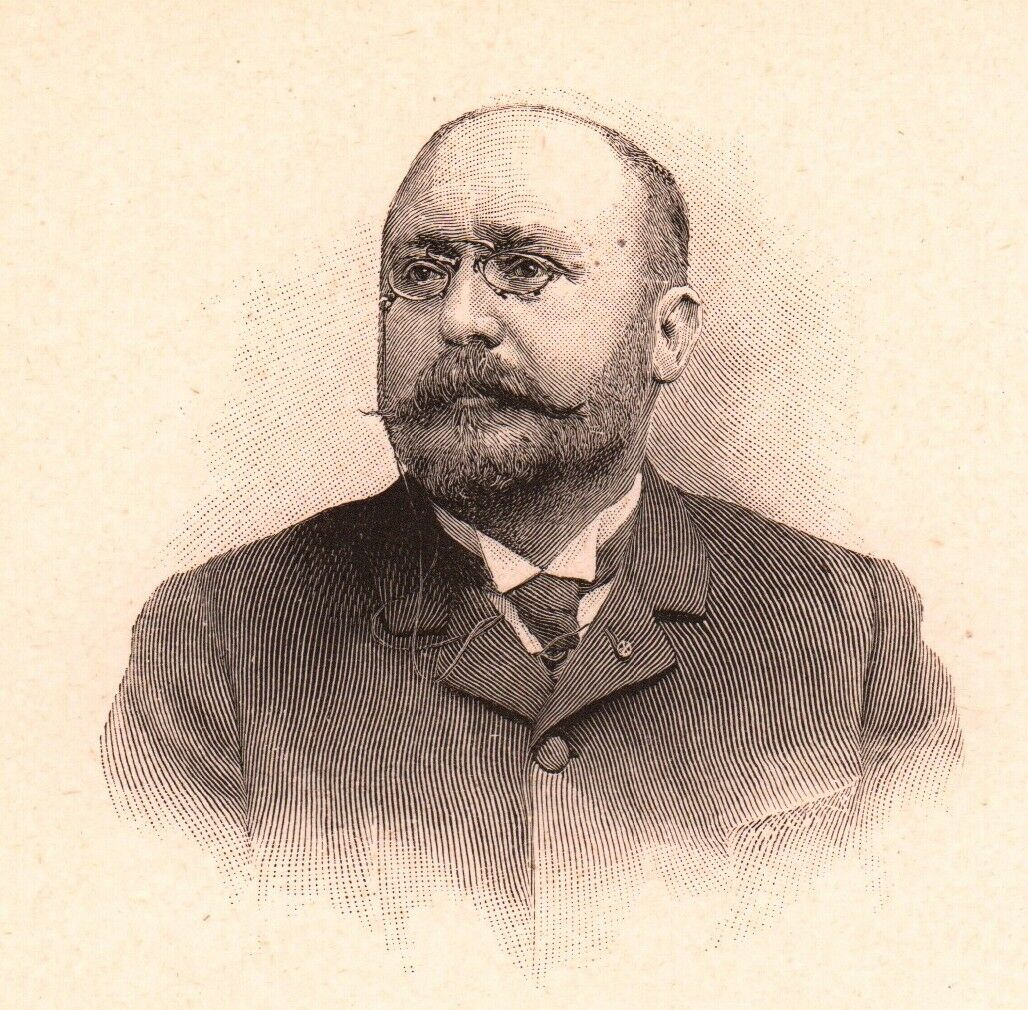
- Born: Henri-Camille Marcel; 25 November 1854; Paris, France
- Died: 6 March 1926 (aged 71); Paris, France
- Occupation: Administrator
- Spouse(s): Laure Meyer (m. 1889; died 1893) Marguerite Meyer (m. 1898)
- Children: Gabriel Marcel

Henri-Camille Marcel, better known as Henry Marcel (25 November 1854 – 6 March 1926), was a French senior official, general administrator of the Bibliothèque nationale de France from 1905 to 1913.

== Career ==
In October 1903, he succeeded Henry Roujon at the head of the École nationale supérieure des beaux-arts of Paris.

In 1905, he was appointed general administrator of the Bibliothèque nationale after Léopold Delisle.

In May 1913, he became head of the Réunion des musées nationaux, until 1919.

In February 1889, he married Laure Meyer (first daughter of banker Maurice Meyer) with whom he had a son, philosopher and playwright Gabriel Marcel. After Laure's premature death, he married her sister, Marguerite.

Preceded by Léopold Delisle	Administrator of the Bibliothèque nationale de France; 1906–1912	Succeeded by Théophile Homolle
