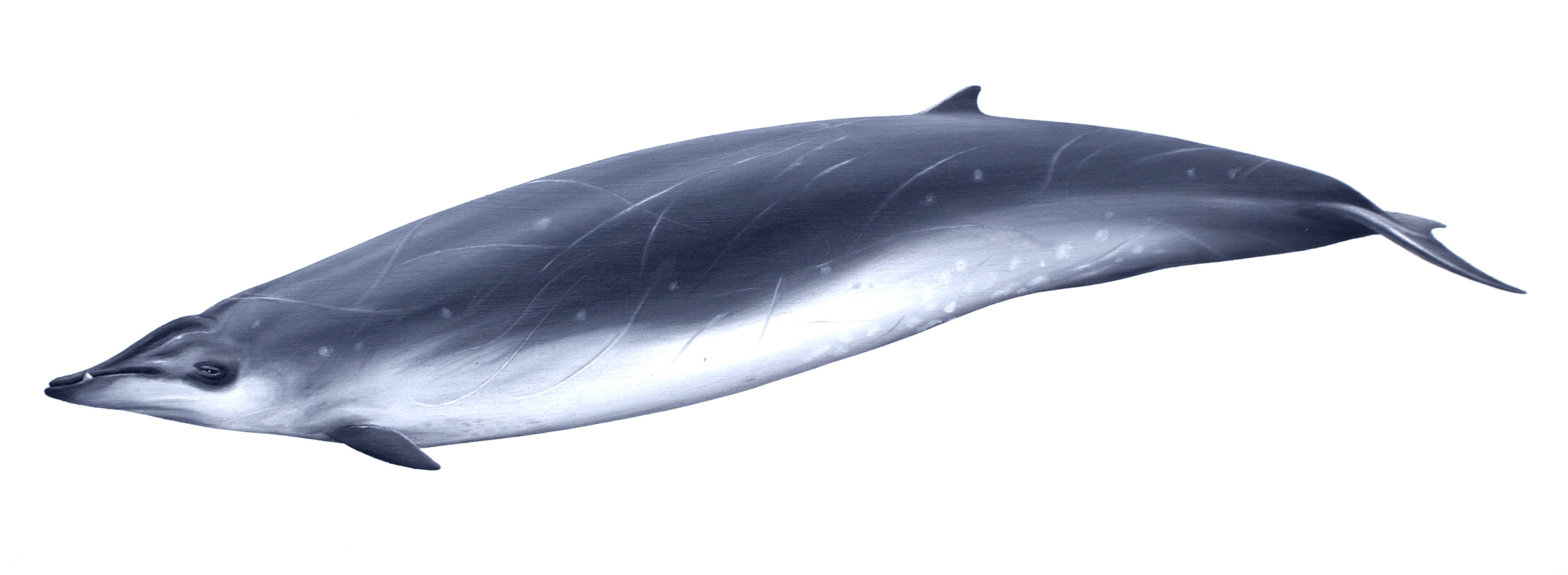

- Size compared to an average human

Conservation status
- Least Concern (IUCN 3.1)
- CITES Appendix II

Scientific classification
- Kingdom: Animalia
- Phylum: Chordata
- Class: Mammalia
- Infraclass: Placentalia
- Order: Artiodactyla
- Infraorder: Cetacea
- Family: Ziphiidae
- Genus: Mesoplodon
- Species: M. europaeus

Binomial name
- Mesoplodon europaeus (Gervais, 1855)
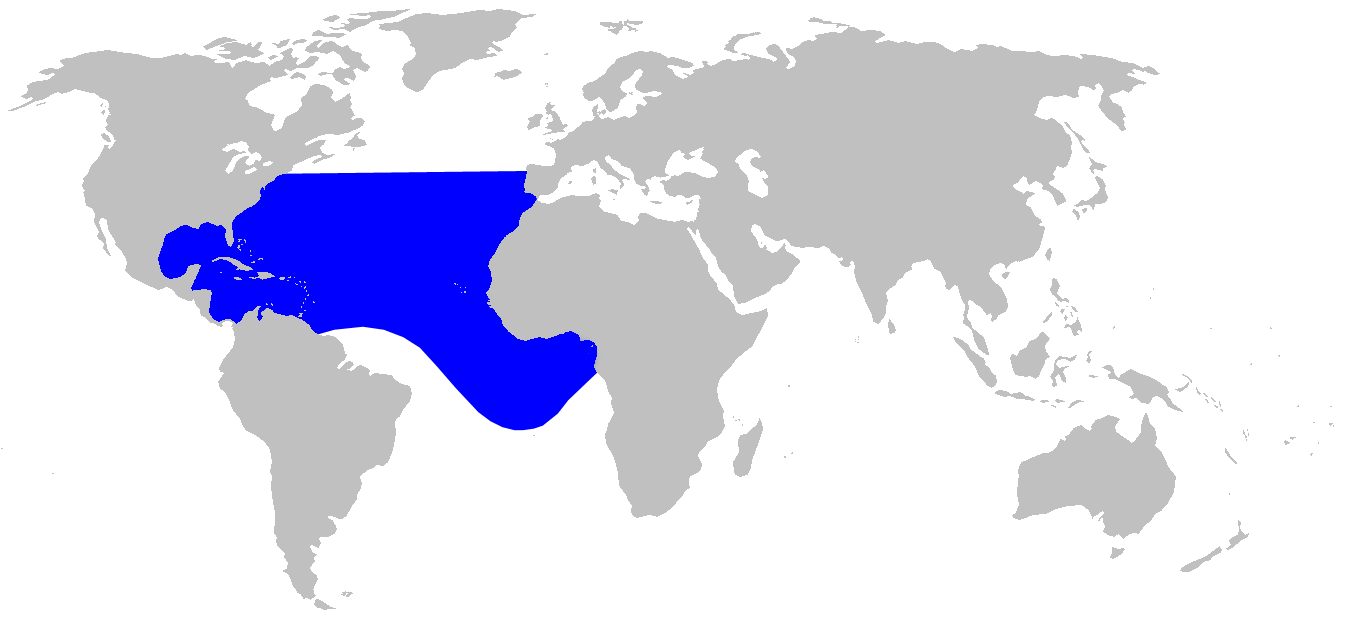
- Gervais's beaked whale range

= Gervais's beaked whale =

Species of whale

Gervais's beaked whale (Mesoplodon europaeus), sometimes known as the Antillean beaked whale, Gulf Stream beaked whale, or European beaked whale (from which its scientific name is derived), is the most frequently stranding type of mesoplodont whale off the coast of North America. It has also stranded off South America and Africa.

== History of discovery ==
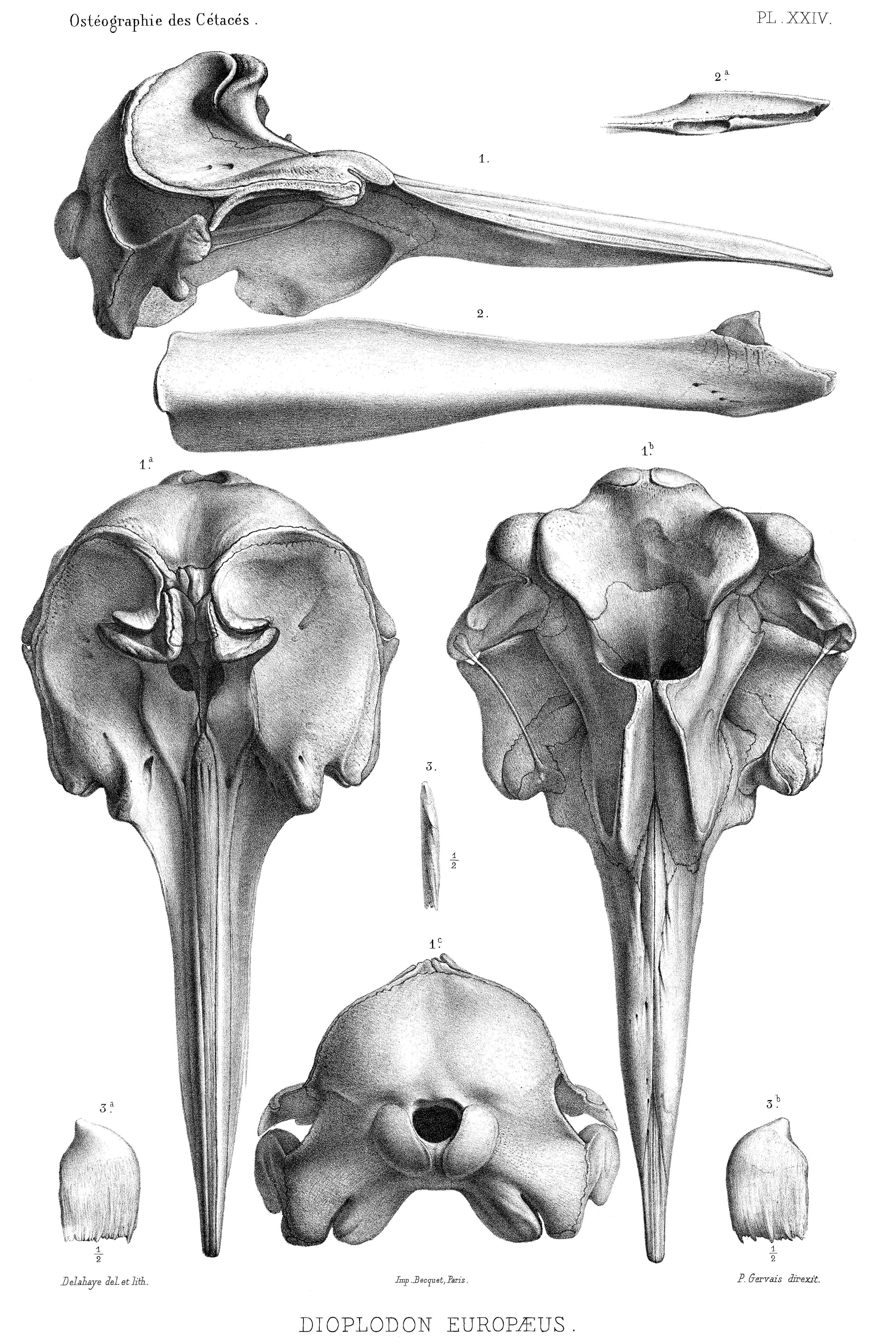
Illustrations of a skull

Sometime between 1836 and 1841, a captain of one of the ships of the French merchant and armorer Abel Vautier came across a large animal floating at the entrance to the English Channel, its body covered by swarming gulls. He cut the head off and transported it to Caen, where he presented it to Vautier. Vautier in turn offered it to the anatomist Deslongchamps. The specimen somehow made its way to the French scientist Paul Gervais, who described it as a new species in 1855.

For several decades this remained as the only known specimen of this species, with many disregarding its specific status and claiming it merely represented an aberrant adult Sowerby's beaked whale.

The species' identity was confirmed by the discovery of two specimens from New Jersey, an immature male captured near Atlantic City in 1889 and an adult female found stranded at North Long Branch in 1905.

== Description ==
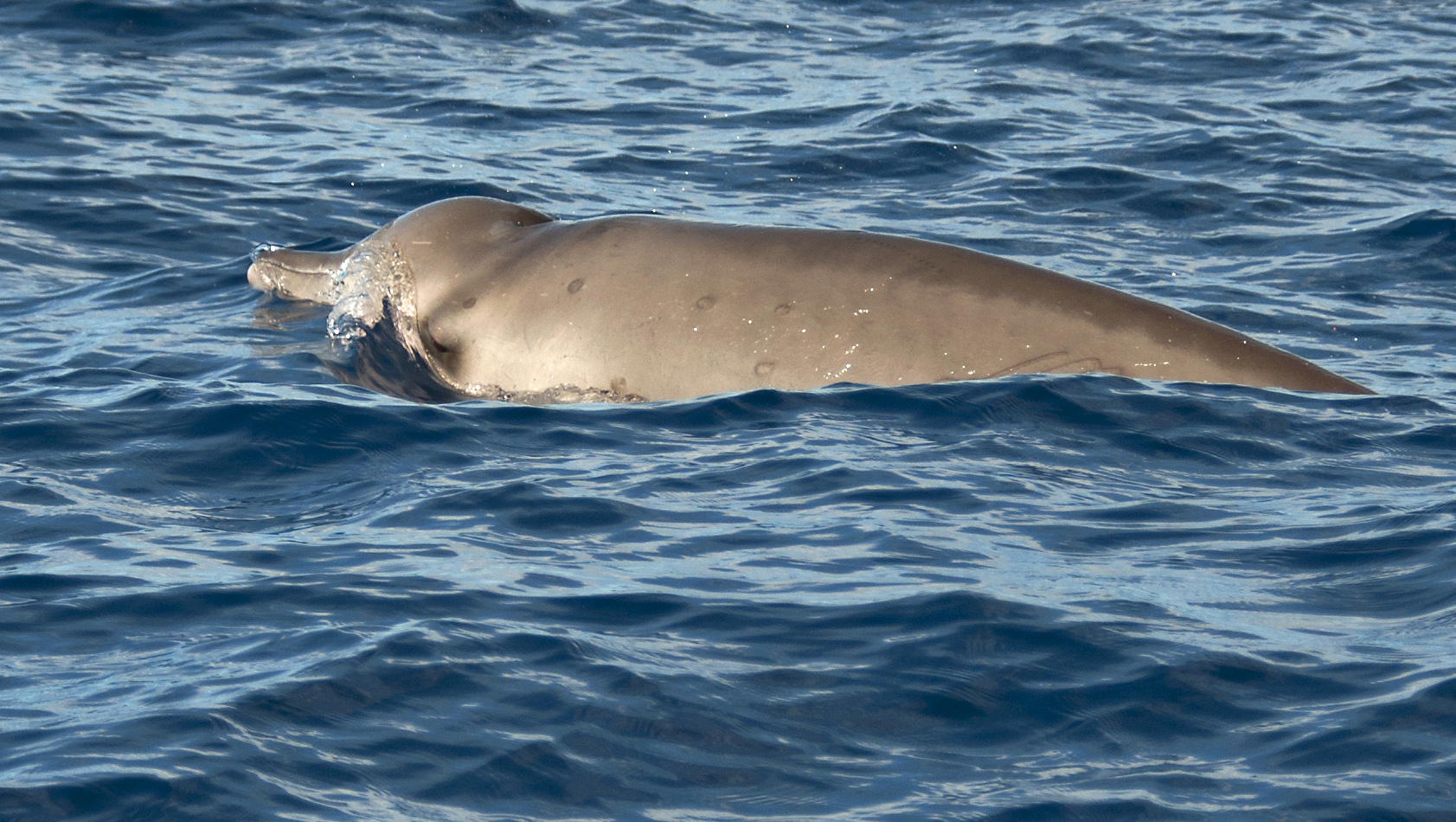
A sighting off Guadeloupe

This species is the largest of the mesoplodonts and rather gracile, elongated, and laterally compressed compared with the others. The mouthline is remarkably straight, even in males, and the two teeth of the male erupt towards the tip of the beak, and are hardly noticeable. The head is overall small and tapering in outline. The melon only bulges very slightly. The coloration is dark gray on top and lighter gray on bottom. Females sometimes have lighter spots near the genitals and face, with a dark circle remaining around the eyes. Juveniles start off with a lighter coloration, but soon darken. Males are 4.5 meters (15 feet) in length and females are at least 5.2 meters (17 feet) and probably weigh more than 1,200 kg (2,600 lb). Calves are believed to be 2.1 meters (6.9 feet) in length. One beached specimen may have been 48 years old.

== Behavior ==
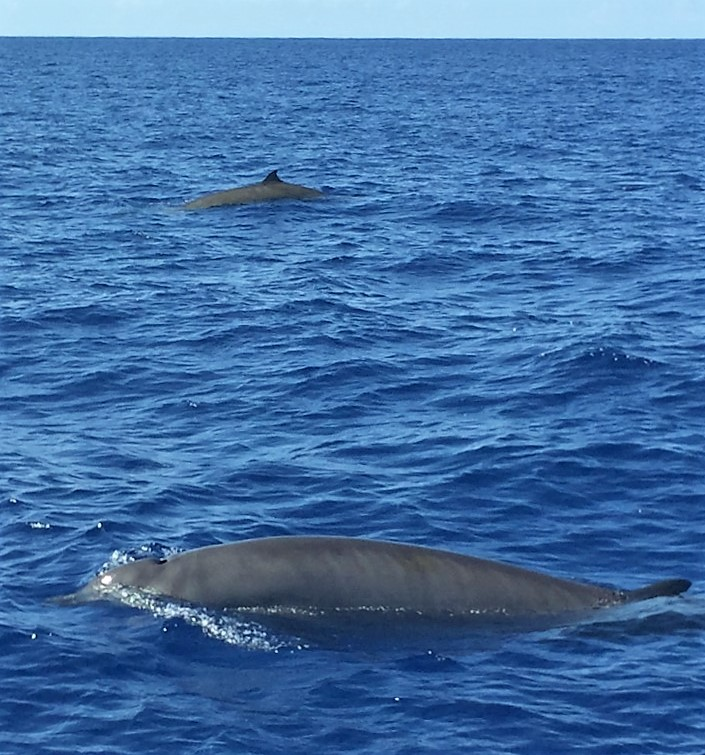
Two females or young adults travelling in the Gulf Stream off North Carolina

Judging by strandings, the whales occur in small groups.

A sighting made in 1998, west of the island of Tenerife, involved three whales swimming over waters 1500 meters deep. Another small group was seen south of the island of Gran Canaria.

Although timid, the whales allowed close photos. They surfaced for a short time, and their dives lasted for around an hour.

In September 2008, northeast of the island of Lanzarote, some Gervais' beaked whales were photographed breaching out of the water.

On May 5, 2011, one juvenile female specimen was found dead and beached at Playa Larga in Maunabo in southeastern Puerto Rico. The juvenile had her stomach filled with (10 pounds) of plastic bags.

On July 10 of the same year, one specimen was found dead in the Yucatán Peninsula, Mexico. Further investigation is being performed to confirm the species in this case.

=== Food and foraging ===
Gervais's beaked whales are presumed to be a deep-diving, echolocating suction-feeder like other Mesoplodon species, creating a negative pressure cavity in its mouth by retracting its tongue and expanding the throat grooves, powerfully drawing prey inside like a biological vacuum. Stomach content analyses revealed a diet of deepwater squid (Octopoteuthis sp., Mastigoteuthis sp., Taonius pavo), fish (viperfish, black gemfish, Lampadena sp.) and crustaceans (Giant red mysid).

== Population and distribution ==
The species is believed to be naturally rare, and no population estimates have been attempted.

Since the discovery of the type specimen, it has been found off the eastern coast of the United States, Ireland, the Canary Islands, western Africa, and Ascension Island.

In August 2001, a specimen was found off São Paulo, Brazil, the southernmost specimen found to date.

Although this species frequently strands, until 1998 no one had made a confirmed sighting of the species. Sightings remain rare.

There had been a possible stranding of this species in Israel.

== Conservation ==
The species has not been hunted and only very infrequently gets tangled in fishing nets. Gervais's beaked whale is covered by the Agreement on the Conservation of Small Cetaceans of the Baltic, North East Atlantic, Irish and North Seas (ASCOBANS) and the Agreement on the Conservation of Cetaceans in the Black Sea, Mediterranean Sea and Contiguous Atlantic Area (ACCOBAMS). The species is further included in the Memorandum of Understanding Concerning the Conservation of the Manatee and Small Cetaceans of Western Africa and Macaronesia.

== See also ==
- List of cetaceans
