= Vesly, Manche =

Vesly
- Commune
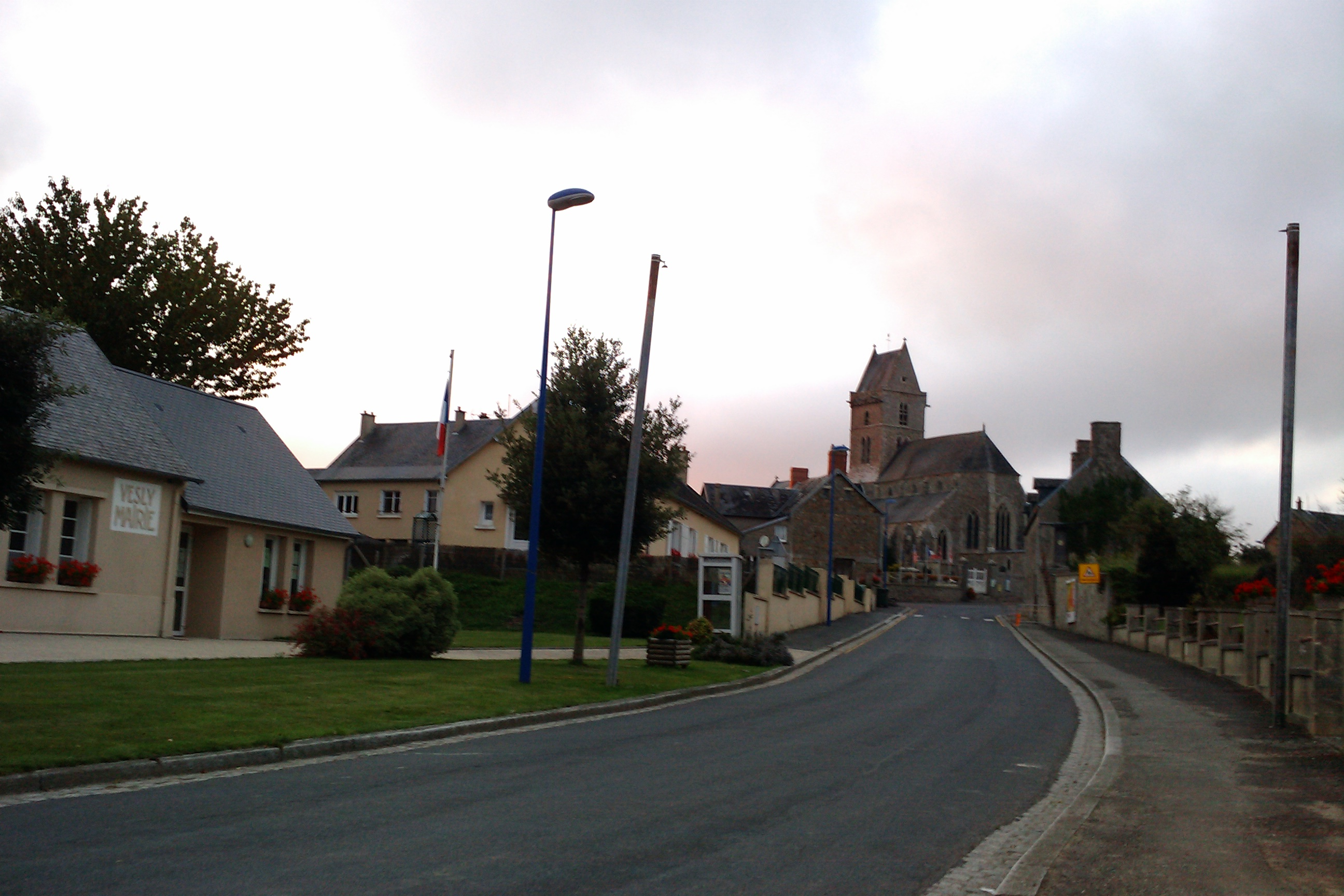
- The town hall and church in Vesly
- Location of Vesly
- Location within France Location within Normandy
- Coordinates: 49°15′09″N 1°30′16″W
- Country: France
- Region: Normandy
- Department: Manche
- Arrondissement: Coutances
- Canton: Créances

Government
  - Mayor (2020–2026): Judith Pirou
- Area^{1}: 22.48 km^{2} (8.68 sq mi)
- Elevation: 70 m (230 ft)
- Highest elevation: 123 m (404 ft)
- Lowest elevation: 6 m (20 ft)
- Population (2023): 728
  - Density: 32.4/km^{2} (83.9/sq mi)
- Time zone: UTC+01:00 (CET)
  - Summer (DST): UTC+02:00 (CEST)
- INSEE/Postal code: 50629 /50430
- ^{1} French Land Register data, which excludes lakes, ponds, glaciers > 1 km^{2} (0.386 sq mi or 247 acres) and river estuaries.

Vesly (French pronunciation: [vɛli]) is a commune in the Manche department in Normandy in north-western France. It has a population of approximately 700 people.

It is located on the Cotentin Peninsula, about 6 km from the sea, 44 km south of Cherbourg and 83 km west of Caen.

In 1973 the commune of Gerville-la-Forêt was consolidated into Vesly as an associated commune.

== Notable people ==
- Charles-Alexis-Adrien Duhérissier de Gerville - historian, naturalist and archaeologist, born in Gerville-la-Forêt

== See also ==
- Communes of the Manche department
