= Édouard Frère =

French bookseller, archivist, biographer and historian

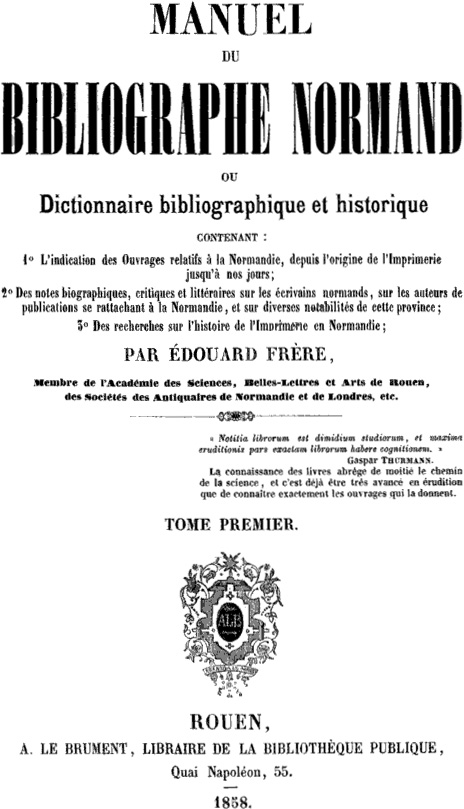
Front page of the Manuel du Bibliographe normand by Édouard Frère.

Édouard Frère (French pronunciation: [edwaʁ fʁɛʁ]; 27 September 1797, Rouen – 7 April 1874, Rouen) was a French bookseller, archivist, biographer, and historian specialized in the Normandy area.

== Life ==
Coming from a lineage of booksellers, Frère's father, Jacques-Christophe operated a significant and near century-old library on the port of Rouen. Despite receiving an education that gave him access to many liberal professions, Frère's family background gave him a passion for books, to which he remained faithful to until his death. After his father's death in 1827, Frère took on work at the family library. From then until 1842, he performed duties as a bookseller, and aided people in the process of writing and sending letters. At the library, he carried on the traditions of Rouen's most renowned publishers by publishing many major works related to Normandy, despite the considerable cost. He repeatedly called on the French artist Eustache Hyacinthe Langlois to provide artwork for these books, for Frère appreciated his refined and delicate style.

Once Frère felt he had gathered enough knowledge, he decided to try his hand at writing. From years of publishing books about all things Norman, he was quite knowledgeable about their traditions and local history. In 1842, Frère sold his library to A. Lebrument, another well-known publisher from Rouen. After this he continued researching, often consulting obscure articles on various elements of Norman history,

After he published these successful local studies, Frère began his opus magnum, the monumental Manuel du Bibliographe normand. The book was the outcome of in-depth research into many different sources and Norman scholars, which took him over five years to complete. This book perfectly answered the expectations promised by its title. Frère owes the better part of his literary and bibliographical notoriety to this work, which has been read by scholars around the world.

In 1846, Frère was appointed as recording secretary at the Chamber of Commerce in Rouen. There, he was instrumental to the maritime and industrial trade of his region. Members of the Chamber of Commerce appreciated his extensive training, hard-working attitude, and discernment, and they jumped at the opportunity to put his knowledge and experience to work. The depth of his knowledge and the seriousness of his work led him to fill the late Louis Bouilhet's post as Director of the Municipal Library of Rouen in 1869. During the few years that Frère spent there, he continued working with passion and drive.

After he was admitted at the Académie des sciences, belles-lettres et arts de Rouen in 1845, Frère became one of the most frequent contributors to its archives, with his work often recognized as thought-provoking. His research consisted of subjects such as: the history of printing in Normandy, printing and bookselling in Rouen in the 15th and 16th centuries, and hypotheses on the origins of typography. On occasion he ventured into the literary field, publishing pieces like: the Fragments littéraires de Jeanne Grey, a note on French and English minstrels, an article on Scandinavian literature, and a page on the history of the Palinods. This last publication marked his last year as president of the Academy of Rouen, a position he has held since 1867.

In 1869, the Rouen government entrusted him with the preservation of its rich and extensive municipal library. Frère, quickly started completing its catalog and review, by increasing the number of notes.

Just as Frère had finished printing a book: Catalogue des manuscrits de la Bibliothèque municipale de Rouen, relatifs à la Normandie, he died at the age of 76.

Frère had been a member of the Société libre d'émulation de la Seine-Inférieure, since 1828. He also belonged to the Society of Antiquaries of Normandy and the Society of Norman Bibliophiles.

== Works ==
- (in French) Manuel du bibliographe normand; ou, Dictionnaire bibliographique et historique contenant : l'indication des ouvrages relatifs à la Normandie, depuis l'origine de l'imprimerie jusqu'à nos jours; des notes biographiques, critiques et littéraires sur les écrivains normands, sur les auteurs de publications se rattachant à la Normandie, et sur diverses notabilités de cette province; des recherches sur l'histoire de l'imprimerie en Normandie, Rouen, A. Le Brument, 1858–1860; reprint New York, Franklin 1964; Paris, Librairie Guénéguaud, 1964; Genève, Slatkine Reprints, 1971.
- (in French) Catalogue des livres rares et curieux, la plupart concernant la Normandie, Rouen, Métérie, 1874.
- (in French) Catalogue des manuscrits relatifs à la Normandie, précédé d'une notice sur la formation de la Bibliothèque et ses accroissements successifs, Rouen, Boissel, 1874.
- (in French) Considérations sur les origines typographiques, Rouen, Péron, 1850.
- (in French) De l'imprimerie et de la librairie à Rouen, dans les XV^{e} et XVI^{e} siècles, et de Martin Morin, célèbre imprimeur rouennais, Rouen, Le Brument, 1843.
- (in French) Des livres de liturgie des églises d'Angleterre (Salisbury, York, Hereford), imprimés à Rouen dans les XV^{e} et XVI^{e} siècles : étude suivie du catalogue de ces impressions, de M.CCCC.XCII à M.D.LVII, avec des notes bibliographiques, Rouen, Le Brument, 1867.
- (in French) Discours de l'entrée de Louis XIV en sa ville de Rouen, capitale de la province et du duché de Normandie, et séjour qu'il y fit en février 1650 : accompagné de la Reine régente et des principaux personnages de la cour, Rouen, Boissel, 1863.
- Exhibition of a choice collection of water-colour and crayon drawings by the late Edouard Frère at the Old Bond Street Galleries, London, T. Agnew & Sons, 1888.
- (in French) Funérailles de Georges d'Amboise, archevêque de Rouen, cardinal, légat du pape, ministre de Louis XII, et gouverneur de la Normandie : célébrées à Lyon et à Rouen du 25 mai au 20 juin 1510, Rouen, Henry Boissel, 1864.
- (in French) Guide de l'étranger dans Rouen. Extrait de l'itinéraire de Th. Licquet, Rouen, Le Brument, 1851.
- (in French) La féodalité, or, Les droits du seigneur : événements mystérieux, lugubres, scandaleux, exactions, despotisme, libertinage de la noblesse et du clergé, suivis de la marche et de la décadence de la féodalité, depuis le moyen âge jusqu'à nos jours, Paris, Chez l'éditeur, 1800.
- (in French) Les Ruines de la coutume de Normandie : ou petit dictionnaire du droit normand restant en vigueur pour les droits acquis, Rouen, Lebrument; Paris, Durand, 1856.
- (in French) Les Veillées littéraires illustrées : choix de romans, nouvelles, poésies, pièces de théâtre, Paris, Bry Ainé, 1849.
- (in French) Notice sur la vie et les travaux de Marc-Isambert Brunel, Rouen, Alfred Péron, 1850.
- (in French) Recherches sur les premiers temps de l'imprimerie en Normandie, Rouen, Édouard Frère, 1829.
- (in French) Rouen : son histoire, ses monuments et ses environs : guide nécessaire aux voyageurs pour bien connaître cette capitale de la Normandie et les localités voisines les plus intéressantes, Rouen, Lebrument, 1861.
- (in French) Rouen au dix-septième siècle, Rouen, Le Brument, 1861, 1655.
- (in French) Rouen; son histoire, ses monuments et ses environs. Guide nécessaire aux voyageurs pour bien connaître cette capitale de la Normandie; suivi de notices sur Dieppe et Arques, Rouen, Le Brument, 1857.
- (in French) Une séance de l'Académie des Palinods en 1640, Rouen, Le Brument, 1867.
- (in French) Voyage historique et pittoresque de Paris à Rouen, sur la Seine, en bateau à vapeur, Rouen, Édouard Frère, 1839.
