= Esprels =

- Commune
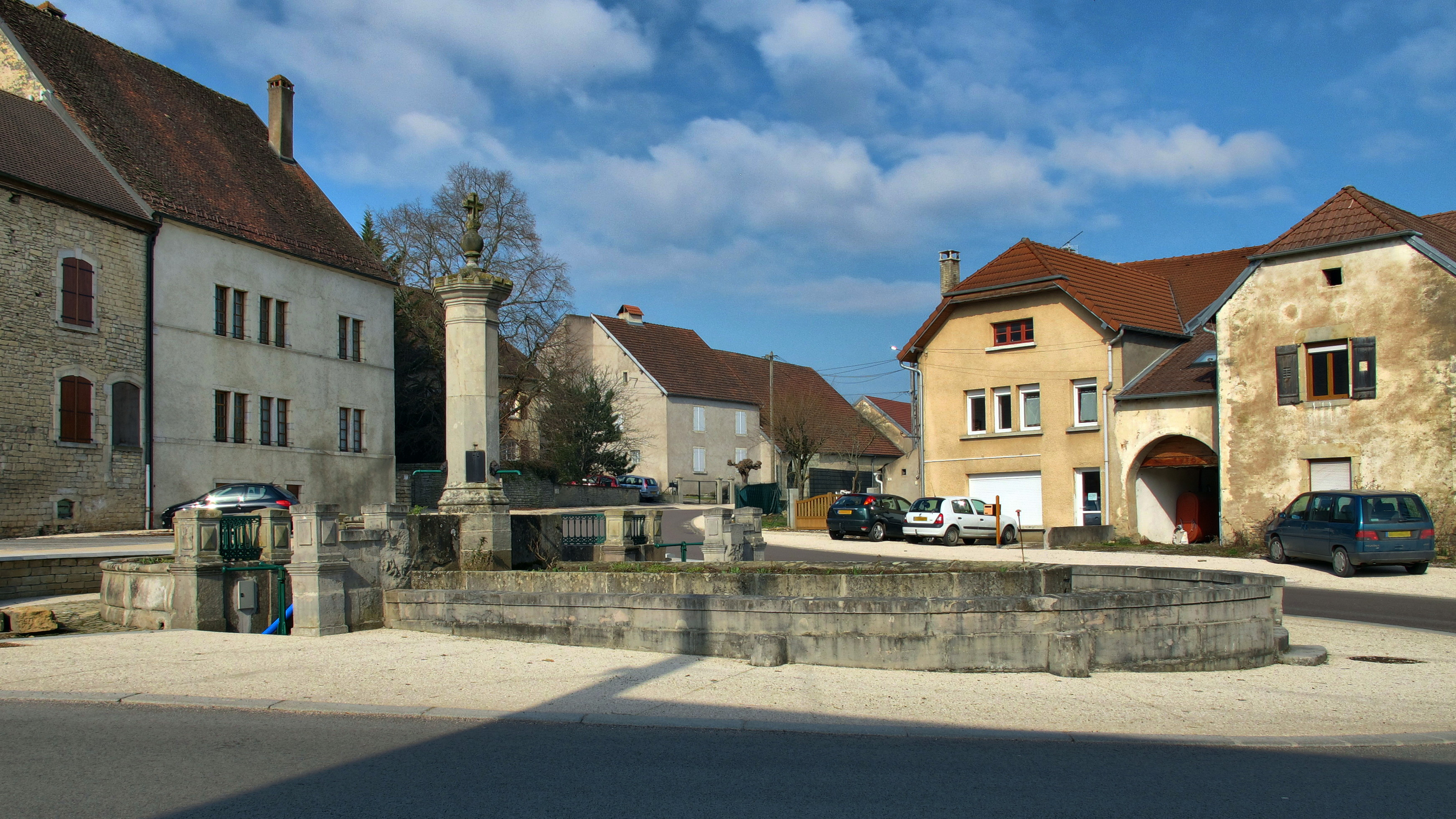
- The fountain in Esprels

- Coat of arms
- Location of Esprels
- Location within France Location within Bourgogne-Franche-Comté
- Coordinates: 47°32′13″N 6°22′23″E
- Country: France
- Region: Bourgogne-Franche-Comté
- Department: Haute-Saône
- Arrondissement: Vesoul
- Canton: Villersexel
- Area^{1}: 14.81 km^{2} (5.72 sq mi)
- Highest elevation: 408 m (1,339 ft)
- Lowest elevation: 252 m (827 ft)
- Population (2023): 699
  - Density: 47.2/km^{2} (122/sq mi)
- Time zone: UTC+01:00 (CET)
  - Summer (DST): UTC+02:00 (CEST)
- INSEE/Postal code: 70219 /70110
- ^{1} French Land Register data, which excludes lakes, ponds, glaciers > 1 km^{2} (0.386 sq mi or 247 acres) and river estuaries.

Esprels is a commune in the Haute-Saône department in the region of Bourgogne-Franche-Comté in eastern France.

== See also ==
- Communes of the Haute-Saône department
