= Eugène Benoist =

French classical philologist (1831–1887)

Eugène Benoist (28 November 1831, Nangis – 23 May 1887, Paris) was a French classical philologist.

From 1852 he studied at the École Normale Supérieure in Paris, followed by work as a schoolteacher at the lycée in Marseille. In 1862 he obtained his doctorate, and five years later became a lecturer of ancient literature in Nancy. In 1869 he attained the title of professor, and from 1871, taught classes in foreign literature at the University of Aix-en-Provence. In 1874 he returned to Paris as a professeur suppléant of Latin poetry at the Sorbonne, where in 1876 he gained a full professorship. In 1884 he was elected a member of the Académie des Inscriptions et Belles-Lettres.

He was the author of many works, for the most part, editions of ancient Latin authors, or critical articles on sections of Latin works; its original authors being: Plautus, Terence, Lucretius, Virgil, Horace, Catullus, Julius Caesar and Livy.

== Selected works ==
- De personis muliebribus apud Plautum, 1862 (dissertation thesis).
- Titi Macci Plauti Cistellariam, 1863 (edition of Plautus).
- P. Virgilii Maronis Opera. Les oeuvres de Virgile (3 volumes), 1867-72 – Works of Virgil.
- Commentaire sur Lucrèce (livre V, 1-111; 678-1455), 1872 – Commentary on Lucretius.
- Plaute : Morceaux choisis; publiés avec une préface, 1880 – Plautus; excerpts.
- C. Valeri Catulli liber. Les poésies de Catulle, (with Eugène Rostand), 1878 – Poetry of Catullus.
- Les Adelphes, 1881 (edition of Terence's Adelphoe).
- Commentaires sur la guerre des Gaules : texte latin, 1893 – Commentary on the Gallic Wars (Julius Caesar).
- Nouveau dictionnaire latin-français (with Henri Goelzer), 1893, 10th edition 1925 – New Latin-French dictionary.
