= Arcisse de Caumont =

French historian and archaeologist

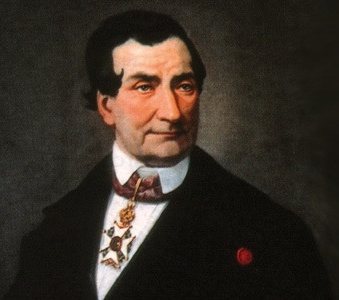
- Born: 20 August 1801; Bayeux
- Died: 16 April 1873 (aged 71); Caen
- Occupations: Historian, archaeologist

Arcisse de Caumont (20 August 1801, Bayeux – 16 April 1873, Caen) was a French historian and archaeologist.

== Biography ==
Arcisse Caumont was born at Bayeux to François de Caumont and Marie-Louise de Mathan Hue. One of his mentors was Charles de Gerville, known, amongst other things, for coining the term "romanesque" (French roman). In 1810, he was sent to school at Falaise. There, the high school principal, Jean-Louis-François Hervieu put him in charge of maintaining the physics instruments. This enraptured the young de Caumont, who had a penchant for studying natural sciences; at age 15, he would give lessons to his classmates. In 1817, back at Bayeux, he entered the high school, and after passing his baccalauréat, he entered law school. He graduated as a bachelor in law on 30 December 1822 and as a master of the law on 28 August 1824. His thesis was entitled: Du rang que les hypothèques ont entre elles, du mode de leur inscription et de leur radiation.

While attending law school, Caumont took classes in the humanities as well, especially those in Roman history. The same year he obtained his bachelor, he wrote an Essai sur l'architecture religieuse du Moyen Âge. He then went on to start teaching a course in monumental archeology, at Caen, its proceedings later to be published in six volumes under the title Histoire de l'architecture religieuse, civile et militaire. Caumont revealed in his memoirs that teachers once asked him to read his notes from the previous day, and he read what he had copied in a history book at the library. Upon receiving their praise, he dared not disclose the truth about his deception.

In 1823, de Caumont founded the Société des Antiquaires de Normandie and the Société Linnéenne de Normandie. In 1833, he founded the Société Française d'archéologie, the Association Normande and the Société pour la Conservation des Monuments. Not only did de Caumont recruit many members for these associations, he also painstakingly went on to encourage working relationships between their various members while giving everyone the opportunity to express their opinions and develop their ideas. He cheerfully encouraged members to make much profit of their research by sharing their observations with one another. In addition to putting up archaeological conventions, he also took to setting up scientific conferences, which enjoyed great success, because they met the intellectual aspirations of his time.

De Caumont's research is credited with providing reliable intellectual foundations for the emergence of Gothic revival in France. He is remembered in the Encyclopédie du Moyen Âge as the first scholar to have established a rational division of architecture into different chronological phases. His works earned him much respect, and he was appointed a correspondent of the Académie des inscriptions et belles-lettres. Comprising three volumes, each covering a major period of architecture, his Abécédaire ou rudiment de l'archéologie, was a popular tool that has been called the vulgate on medieval architecture. It gave the intellectual movement that spread throughout France a boost reflected by the foundation of a variety of scholarly and literary societies, each now endowed with a library, archives, and, even for a few, a museum.

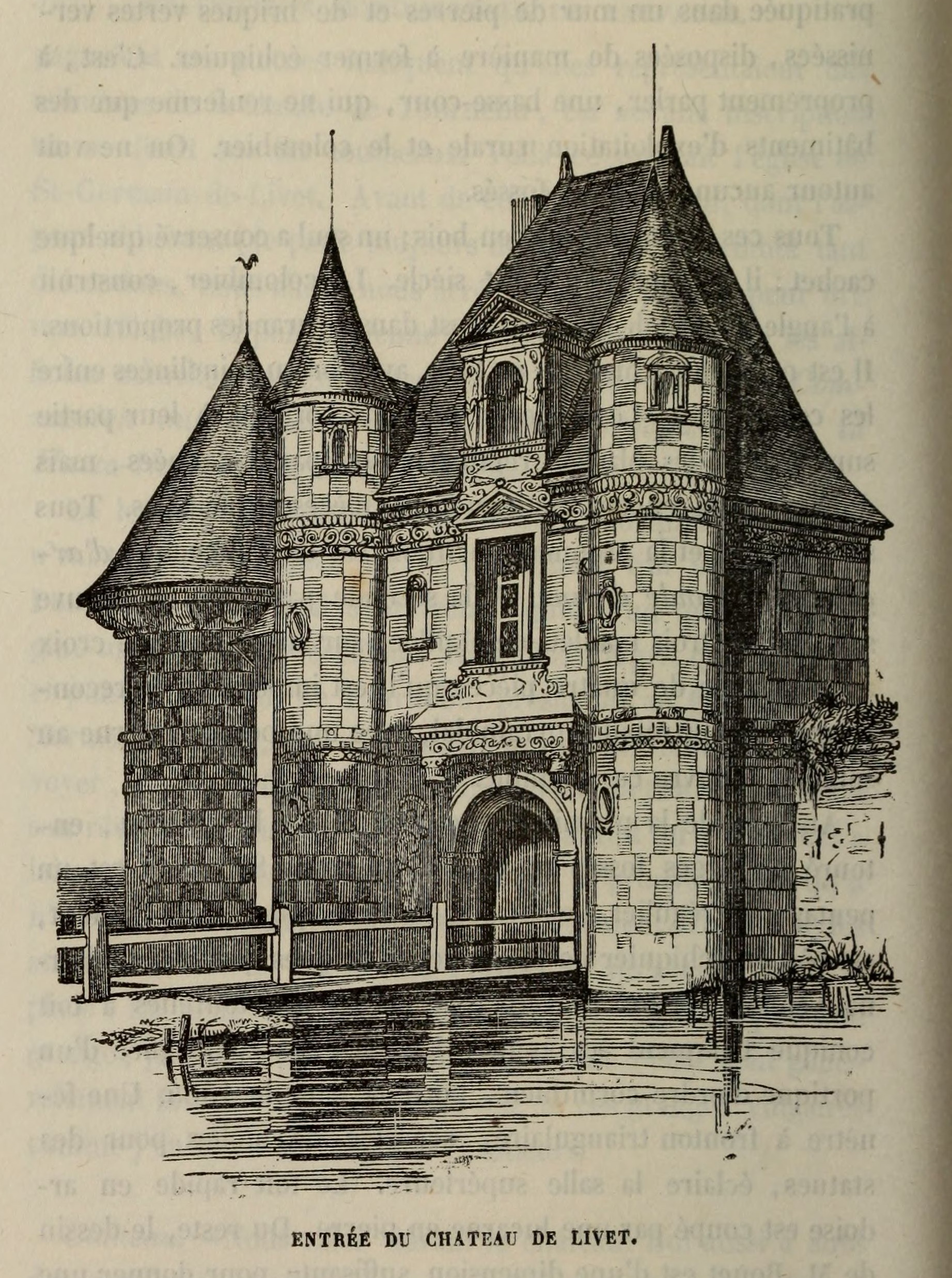
Château de Saint-Germain-de-Livet from Statistique monumentale du Calvados

De Caumont penned more than thirty books on archeology, and he very actively contributed to the publication of about two hundred volumes of reports and briefs by the learned societies he founded. His magnum opus is the monumental Cours d'antiquités monumentales: histoire de l'art dans l'ouest de la France, depuis les temps les plus reculés jusqu'au XVII^{e} siècle, published from 1830 to 1841, it covers the religious, civil and military architecture of the Gallo-Roman to the medieval era.

A philanthropist, de Caumont endowed his hometown with a botanical garden and an elementary school. A high school and a street there have been named after him in his hometown. Upon his death at Caen, he was buried in the cemetery in the suburb of that city.

== Works ==
- (in French) Mémoire géologique: sur quelques terrains de la Normandie occidentale. Caen, Chalopin Fils, 1825.
- (in French) Essai sur l'architecture religieuse du Moyen Age, principalement en Normandie. Caen, Chalopin fils, 1825.
- (in French) Essai sur la topographie géognostique du département du Calvados. Caen, Chalopin, 1828.
- (in French) Mémoires de la Société linnéenne de Normandie, Paris, Lance, 1829.
- (in French) Cours d'antiquités monumentales professé à Caen, en 1830, (1^{re} partie: Antiquités celtiques; 2^{e} partie et 3^{e} partie: Antiquités gallo-romaines; Architecture religieuse; 5^{e} partie: Architecture militaire; 6^{e} partie: État de la peinture, de la calligraphie, de l'orfèvrerie et autres arts à l'époque du Moyen Âge). Caen, Lange, 1830-41.
- (in French) Histoire sommaire de l'architecture religieuse, civile et militaire au Moyen Âge. Caen, Lance, 1836.
- (in French) Histoire de l'architecture religieuse au Moyen Âge. Caen, Derache, 1841.
- (in French) Rapport verbal fait à la société Française pour la conservation des monuments dans la séance administrative du 7 déc. 1844, sur quelques antiquités du midi de la France. Caen, [s.n.], 1845.
- (in French) Statistique monumentale du Calvados. Caen, Le Blanc-Hardel, 1846-67. Volume 1; Volume 2; Volume 3; Volume 4; Volume 5.
- (in French) Statistiques routières de la Basse-Normandie. Caen, Derache, 1855.
- (in French) Abécédaire héraldique, ou Notions générales sur le blason. Caen, A. Hardel, 1861.
- (in French) Inauguration d'un monument à Dives en mémoire du départ de l'armée de Guillaume-le-Bâtard pour la conquête de l'Angleterre en 1066. Caen, A. Hardel, 1861.
- (in French) Bulletin monumental ou collection de memoires et de renseignements sur la statistique monumentale de la France, 1865.
- (in French) Archéologie des écoles primaires. Caen, Le Blanc-Hardel, 1868.
- (in French) Le Mur de Laudunum. Caen, [s.n.], 1868.
- (in French) Abécédaire ou rudiment d'archéologie. Caen, F. Le Blanc-Hardel, 1869.
- (in French) Le Beurre d'Isigny à Monaco. Caen, F. Le Blanc-Hardel, 1869.
- (in French) La Vallée de la Dives: statistique ripuaire. Caen, Res Universis, 1853, reprint 1992.

== Bibliography ==
- Arcisse de Caumont (1801-1873), érudit normand et fondateur de l'archéologie française, (Mémoires de la Société des antiquaires de Normandie, t. XL|), 2004, 515 p., 158 ill.
