= Paul Lacombe (historian) =

French historian and archivist

Paul Lacombe (January 6, 1834 in Cahors – July 2, 1919 in Lauzerte) was a French historian and archivist.

In a period of intense disciplinary debate among historians and sociologists at the turn of twentieth century Lacombe entered the debate about 'history served by scientific inquiry' through his groundbreaking work, De l'histoire considérée comme science [The History Considered as Science] (1894) and with his contributions to Revue de synthèse historique [The Journal of Historical Synthesis] of Henri Berr. Refusing an approach to history based on the mere narration of great dates and great men, he invented the concept of 'history of events' (l'histoire evenementielle) and insisted on the need for the historian to make strict selections of evidence and to establish a hierarchy among facts. He also laid the foundations of a history which brings social and economic factors to the forefront of investigation. He is, therefore, a precursor to the idea of Fernand Braudel and the Annales school that history needs to be studied in 'the long time' (longue durée). He also championed the idea of the history of Homo faber as "man has at all times been to a great extent a workman."

== Bibliography ==
- Arms and Armour in Antiquity and the Middle Ages: also a descriptive notice of modern weapons; translated from the French of M.P. Lacombe, and with a preface, notes, and one additional chapter on Arms and armour in England by P Lacombe
- Arms and Armour in Antiquity and the Middle Ages : also a descriptive notice of modern weapons
- De l'histoire considérée comme science
- A Short History of the French People
- The Growth of a People: A Short Study in French History
