= Gervais de La Rue =

French historian (1751–1835)

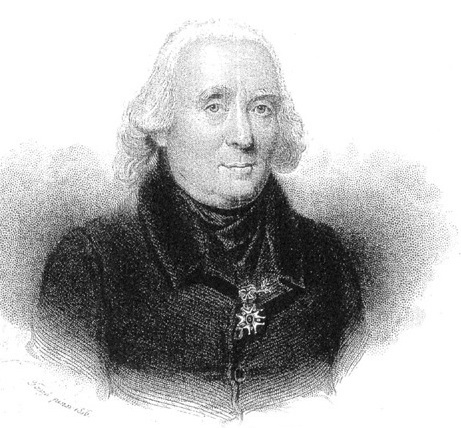
A portrait of Gervais de La Rue

Gervais de La Rue (7 September 1751 – 24 September 1835), French historical investigator, once regarded as one of the chief authorities on Norman and Anglo-Norman literature.

== Biography ==
Gervais de La Rue was a native of Caen. He received his education at the university of that town, and was ultimately raised to the rank of professor.

His first historical enterprise was interrupted by the French Revolution, which forced him to take refuge in England, where he took the opportunity to examine a vast mass of original documents in the Tower of London and elsewhere, and received much encouragement, from Sir Walter Scott among others. From England, he moved to Holland, still in prosecution of his favorite task. In 1798, he returned to France. The rest of his life was spent in his native town, where he was chosen principal of his university.

While in England, he had been elected a member of the Royal Society of Antiquaries; and in his own country he was made a corresponding member of the Institute, and was enrolled in the Légion d'Honneur.

Besides numerous articles in the Memoirs of the Royal Society of London, the Mémoires de l'Institut, the Mémoires de la Societé d'Agriculture de Caen, and in other periodical collections, he published separately Essais historiques sur les Bardes, les Jongleurs, et les Trouvères normands et anglo-normands (3 vols., 1834), and Recherches historiques sur la Prairie de Caen (1837); and after his death appeared Mémoires historiques sur le palinod de Caen (1841), Recherches sur la tapisserie de Bayeux (1841), and Nouveaux Essais historiques sur la ville de Caen (1842). In all his writings, he displayed a strong partiality for everything Norman, and rated the Norman influence on French and English literature as of the very highest moment.

== Main publications ==
- (in French) Essais historiques sur la ville de Caen et son arrondissement (2 vol., 1820)
- (in French) Recherches sur la tapisserie représentant la conquête de l’Angleterre par les Normands et appartenant à l’église cathédrale de Bayeux (1824, on the Bayeux Tapestry)
- (in French) Essais historiques sur les bardes, les jongleurs et les trouvères normands et anglo-normands, suivis de pièces de Malherbe, qu’on ne trouve dans aucune édition de ses œuvres (3 vol., 1834)
- (in French) Mémoire historique sur le palinod de Caen (1841)
- (in French) Nouveaux essais historiques sur la ville de Caen et son arrondissement, contenant mémoires d’antiquités locales et annales militaires, politiques et religieuses de la ville de Caen et de la Basse-Normandie (2 vol., 1842)
