= Ancient settlement of Montaigu-la-Brisette =

Gallo-Roman secondary settlement in Normandy, France

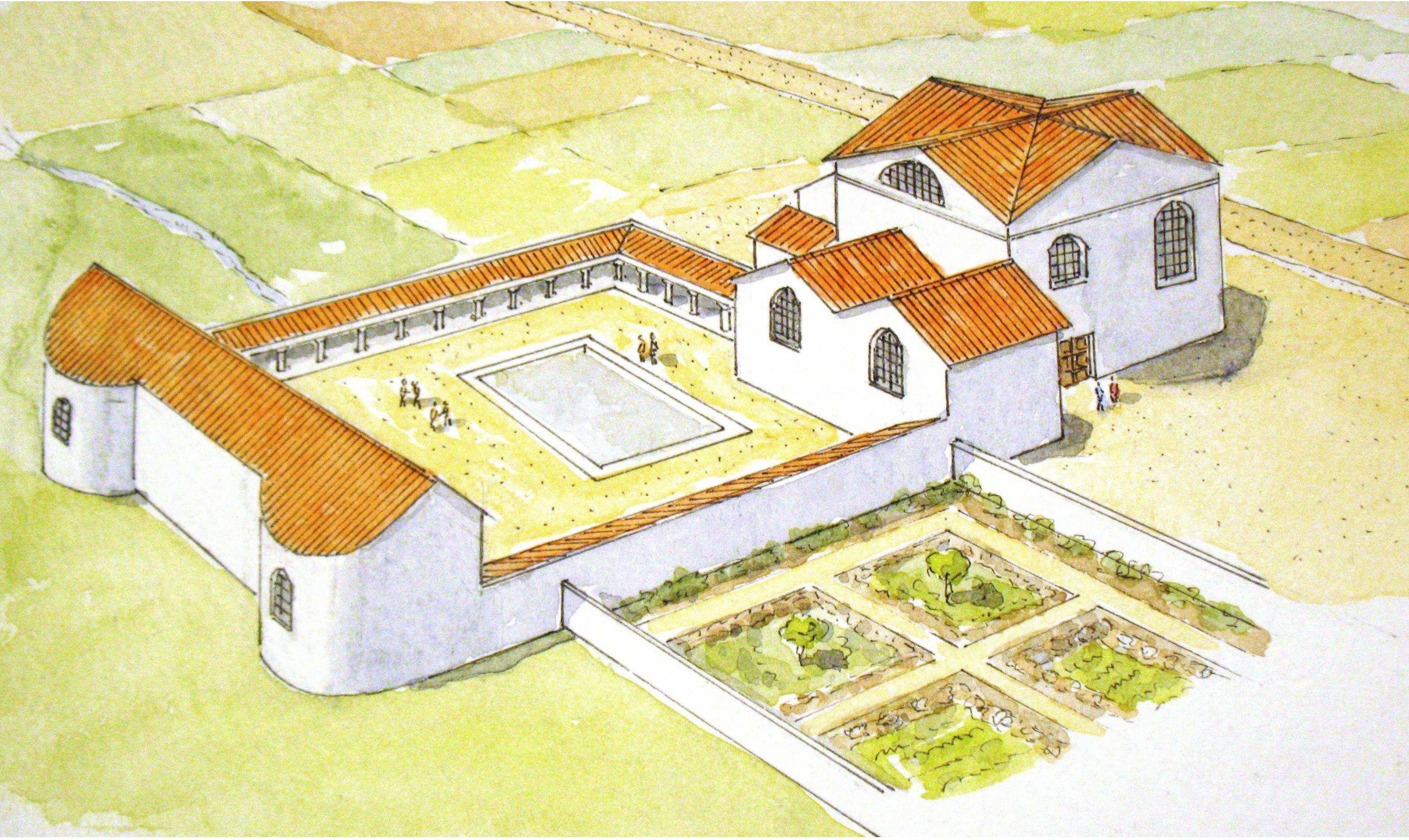
- Artist's impression of the baths (4th state)

- Location within France
- 49.582418°N 1.444624°W
- Location: Montaigu-la-Brisette, Manche, Normandy, France

History
- Built: Mid-1st century AD

Site notes
- Area: 15 hectares

The ancient settlement of Montaigu-la-Brisette is a Gallo-Roman secondary settlement (vicus) of the first three centuries AD, located in the territory of the modern commune of Montaigu-la-Brisette, in the French department of Manche, in the region of Normandy.

In ancient geography, this Gallo-Roman secondary settlement of the first three centuries AD lies in the north-eastern part of the civitas of the Unelli (province of Gallia Lugdunensis); it is, however, not mentioned in any text and does not appear on any ancient itinerary. Despite its small size, estimated at no more than 15 hectares (37 acres) for its densely built part, it includes a large sanctuary in the northwest and monumental public baths partly built above the bed of a channelled stream in the southeast. By contrast, the buildings in the central part include well-off dwellings with porticoes alongside constructions of more modest plan but with gardens or outbuildings of perhaps craft use, all in a fairly loose organisation with no uniform urban scheme. This configuration raises questions about the function and status of the settlement, which may have been a stopover town on an ancient route and/or a centre of cereal production. At a greater or lesser distance from the settlement, agricultural or craft establishments seem to be linked to the main site; they were in any case active from the 1st century to the 3rd century AD, like the settlement itself.

The activity of the site declined towards the end of the 3rd century. It was definitively abandoned at the beginning of the 4th century and its masonry was then systematically salvaged over the centuries. Since no medieval settlement emerged from the remains of the ancient town, it was covered by forest and fell into oblivion before its remains were rediscovered in the early 19th century and studied two centuries later (surveys followed by test pits and planned excavations between 1999 and 2011). These remains, foundations of walls or roads or sometimes only their traces, were buried again after the excavations: nothing of the ancient settlement remains standing, and only fragments of architectural terracotta or bands of pebbles on the ground surface indicate its presence.

== Geography ==
=== Location ===
The ancient settlement lies in the northern part of the territory of the commune of Montaigu-la-Brisette (3.2 km northwest of the commune's main village), west of the locality called "le Hameau Dorey" and of the D 63 road, and south of the Montaigu-la-Brisette animal park. The site is also almost on the boundary with the commune of Saussemesnil to the west, and not far from Teurthéville-Bocage to the east. The nearest points of the Cotentin coast are about 10 km away as the crow flies, to the northwest at Bretteville and to the east towards Morsalines.

Relief map of the ancient site.

The ancient site sits at the bottom of the small valley of the ruisseau aux Presles, a sub-tributary on the right bank of the Saire; this stream, about 1 km long, flows into the Querbot, which joins the Saire some 6 km further on. It extends on both sides of the stream near its source, but developed mainly on the left bank, since that slope has better exposure. Elevations in the modern landscape are 103 m near the sanctuary, which stands at the highest point of the site, 93 m at the source of the stream, and down to 87 m at the baths, which gives the stream a gradient of about 3% across the site. Studies have shown, however, that in antiquity the streambed lay at a lower elevation; it was later raised by human activity in the first centuries AD and then by deposits from the erosion of the hillside.

=== Geology ===
The geological substrate is a layer of weathered schist (alterite) dated to the late Precambrian (Brioverian). It is covered by fine silts containing clay inclusions, and then topsoil. In the immediate surroundings of the site, outcrops of Triassic pebbles are reported to the west, together with the conglomerate (puddingstone) formed from them, as well as, locally and further south, shallow veins of Armorican sandstone. Finally, to the north, clays are mixed with the Triassic sand deposits. All of these rocks are found in the construction or backfill materials of the ancient settlement, whether on the site of the town itself or coming from specialised tile workshops located some distance away.

=== Territorial context ===
Suggested partition of the territory of the Unelli.

Together with Alauna, Coriallum (Cherbourg-en-Cotentin) and Portbail, Montaigu-la-Brisette is one of four ancient settlements in the Cotentin Peninsula whose presence is attested by archaeological remains. Others are mentioned in the literature without their location being known (Crociatonum, perhaps Saint-Côme-du-Mont or Carentan, or Grannonum, which Charles de Gerville identified with Portbail in 1829) or their antiquity remains to be verified (Fermanville, Beuzeville-au-Plain, Saint-Jores and L'Étang-Bertrand). In the geography of the Roman Empire, the Montaigu site belonged to the civitas of the Unelli, whose territory roughly corresponds to the Cotentin peninsula. Under the Early Roman Empire, this territory appears to have been administratively divided in two at about the latitude of Carentan. Montaigu-la-Brisette fell within the northern part, run from Alauna, which lies 8 km to the southwest, while the southern part was administered from Cosedia (Coutances). Under the Late Roman Empire, the administratively reunified civitas of the Unelli had Constantia (the new name of Cosedia) as its sole chief town and became the Constantinus Pagus, which gave its name to the Cotentin.

=== Regional road network ===
A road crosses the settlement from east to west. To the east, for lack of discovered remains, its destination is unknown; it may have led towards the eastern shore of the Cotentin through the Val de Saire. To the west it is better documented archaeologically, and it very probably joined the road linking Alauna to the northern coast of the Cotentin (Cherbourg-en-Cotentin, as indicated by the Peutinger table, or Fermanville). It is the only one, in the present state of knowledge, to connect with the network of ancient roads of the Cotentin. However, the still incomplete state of research across the Cotentin probably tends to underestimate the importance of the ancient road network on the peninsula.

== History ==
=== Chronology of the occupation ===
Indicative chronology of the ancient occupation of the Montaigu-la-Brisette site (years AD)

A few isolated Palaeolithic artefacts (knapped flints or their flakes), and somewhat more numerous traces of the following periods (Mesolithic and Neolithic), have been found in the surroundings of the site. At the Hameau Dorey itself, the oldest evidence consists of bronze or silver coins, the latter datable to the 1st century BC but possibly in circulation long after they were issued, mixed with Gallo-Roman coins; no lasting human occupation appears to precede the foundation of the ancient settlement, which seems to have been a creation ex nihilo on land cleared in the catchment area of the stream.

By about the middle of the 1st century AD, the settlement already seems to have been structured by a network of ditches delimiting a kind of urban blocks. The roadways were surfaced with pebbles and fragments of roof tile. The sanctuary, consisting of a fanum surrounded by its peribolos, was set on a terrace on the north bank. Dwellings were built between the sanctuary and the stream. On the other bank a peri-urban settlement developed, which in one case included a kiln.

The first phase of urbanisation (phase 1) ran from the last third of the 1st century to the 140s–150s. The first stone houses and the public baths date from this period, although the baths are difficult to date: they already included a complex of rooms in the north and a palaestra built across the stream, which was partly channelled and dammed. The road system became denser. Well-off houses were built between the spring, the baths and the decumanus; their foundations are of schist, sandstone or puddingstone, depending on the case.

A second stage (phase 2) took place in the second half of the 2nd century and ended around 170–180. The management of the stream seems to have been completed to feed a mill set on its left bank. New houses were built between the sanctuary and the decumanus; some had a portico and they were served by lanes. On the other bank, warehouses were mostly built, as well as a well. The presence of kilns or hearths in the northeast and northwest of the urbanised area seems to show a wish to push polluting activities to the margins of the town. The sanctuary was remodelled, with annexe buildings added within an enlarged sacred enclosure. Buildings were erected on the right bank of the stream.

The site seems to have reached its peak in the last decades of the 2nd century and the early 3rd century, a period ending around 210–220 (phase 3), when changes consisted of reconstructions and extensions of existing structures.

During the 3rd century and until about 270–280 (phase 4), development was mixed: the public baths were enlarged, but at the same time some houses, warehouses and the hydraulic works were destroyed. The plan of the surviving houses was simplified. From then on, and more certainly during the first decades of the 4th century (phase 5), the settlement seems to have been abandoned, beginning with its public buildings, and its buildings served as a stone quarry until very recent times. This decline is part of a wider phenomenon across the Cotentin, which saw, at about the same time, the disappearance of some ancient establishments and the shrinking of others.

No hamlet or medieval settlement was built on the site of the ancient settlement, and none of those nearby seems to be its "heir"; no element of the ancient road system was taken up by a modern track. The landscape gradually closed as the forest reclaimed the site, before the area was cleared again and returned to agriculture in the early 19th century.

=== Rediscovery and archaeological research ===
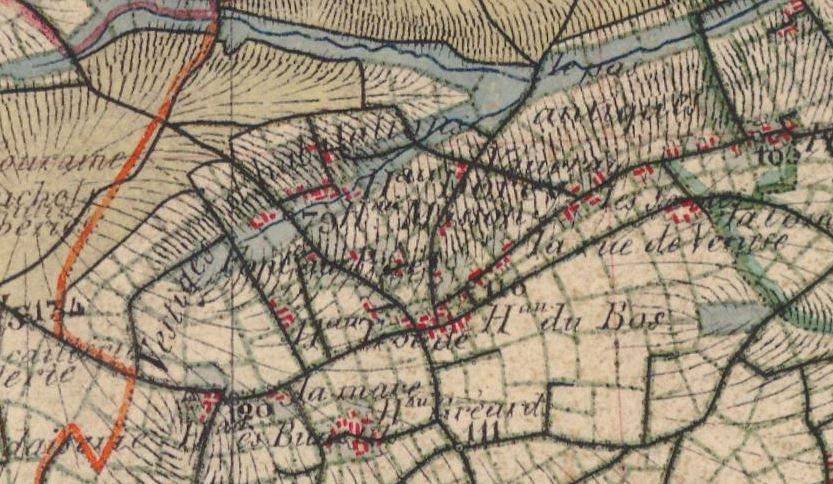
The site on the état-major map.

The Montaigu site is not mentioned in any ancient or medieval document. It was not until the 19th century that the clearing of the Barnavast woods (today largely reduced to an area straddling the communes of Montaigu-la-Brisette, Le Theil and Teurthéville-Bocage) brought to light masonry structures associated with ancient buildings. In 1829 and then in 1854, Charles de Gerville was the first to describe the ancient past of Montaigu-la-Brisette precisely, noting that one could find there "old, well-cemented walls and many bricks, certain signs of Roman dwellings". These discoveries were part of a broader survey effort in which de Gerville was at first informed of the activities of "treasure hunters". He recorded, on cadastral plans kept in the library of Cherbourg, the concentrations of Roman tiles in the areas of Valognes and Montaigu-la-Brisette. Sheet no. 17 of the état-major map, surveyed for this area between 1835 and 1845, mentions the presence of "remains of ancient dwellings" at the southern edge of the Barnavast woods, in the Querbot valley.

The remains, not very imposing according to de Gerville's description, then fell into almost total oblivion until the end of the 20th century. A few isolated mentions appear in 1901 and in 1962, and the Carte archéologique de la Gaule, published in 1989 for the department of Manche and written by Jacqueline Pilet-Lemière and Daniel Levalet, mentions only a few levelled walls and a clay statuette found on the site. Ten years earlier, however, Frédéric Scuvée had reported the possible existence of a fanum. In 2000, an oral survey among the oldest inhabitants of Montaigu-la-Brisette showed that some of them knew the tradition of an ancient settlement at the level of the rue de Venise, southeast of the Hameau Dorey.

To try to find the sites mentioned by de Gerville, the critical analysis of written and oral sources was accompanied by a campaign of field-walking and aerial surveys (the latter being however not as effective in a bocage landscape as in open fields) begun in 1999 in the Nord-Cotentin and quickly refocused in the following years on the Montaigu-la-Brisette area, which was particularly promising; this strand of study continued until 2002. It then appeared necessary to undertake campaigns of test pits and archaeological assessments (2002 to 2008) with the threefold aim of defining the perimeter of what proved to be an ancient settlement, studying its organisation and characterising some of its components, such as the large sanctuary. In parallel, the complete excavation of the baths was undertaken; it ended in 2010, accompanied by the study of the management of the stream. Numerous dwellings were located, as well as craft structures and warehouses. The road network meshing the settlement began to be better understood. In addition, peripheral sites outside the more densely urbanised area were located. It is the complementarity of the different investigation methods used throughout this period by the field operators (CRAHAM, the Groupe de recherches archéologiques du Cotentin (GRAC) and Inrap) that makes it possible to offer the most plausible image and chronology of the ancient settlement of Montaigu-la-Brisette by synthesising the results obtained.

The work done is publicised through visits to excavation sites (European Heritage Days), publications (regional daily press, scientific or heritage journals) and exhibitions. The latter is notably illustrated by the exhibition ArchéoCotentin II, which traces the history of the peninsula in Antiquity and the Middle Ages and ran from 1 December 2023 to 10 March 2024 at the Thomas-Henry Museum in Cherbourg-en-Cotentin; panels and material found during the excavations told the history of the Montaigu-la-Brisette site, and the exhibition gave rise to the publication of a catalogue.

== Description ==
The archaeological site of Montaigu-la-Brisette, in the north of the commune, lies within a landscape of Norman bocage, that of the landscape unit known as the "wooded inner Val de Saire". It is made up of small natural meadows and hedges, bordered to the north by the remnants of the Barnavast woods, which were much larger before the clearances of the 19th century. The farming carried out there disturbs the soil little; it is not favourable to anthropogenic deposits, and archaeological remains are found on the surface (finds, scattered building materials) or a few tens of centimetres deep, under the layer of ploughsoil (foundations still in place of dismantled buildings, or the trenches from which their materials were salvaged, covered over again after the excavations).

=== Urban character and function ===
Timeless plan of the ancient settlement. It does not show the settlement at a given period; it compiles on one base map most of the remains and structures uncovered by surveys, test pits and excavations, whatever their date.

The ancient town of Montaigu-la-Brisette has a surprising appearance. On the fifteen or so hectares covered by the most densely urbanised part of the town (500 × 300 m at its greatest extent) in the most recent state of knowledge, houses that are for the most part rather simple and modest and structures devoted to craft activities, partly organised on a fairly free plan, stand alongside two public monuments, the sanctuary and the baths. These lie at the two ends of the town, northwest and southeast, share the same orientation, were repeatedly repaired and enlarged, and alone occupy 7.5% of the urban space. Such a disproportion puzzles archaeologists: Laurent Paez-Rezende, Laurence Jeanne and Caroline Duclos note the absence of private baths in the houses of Montaigu-la-Brisette, without however linking this observation to the size of the public baths. The large size of these facilities may indicate active and powerful euergetism on the part of local dignitaries over several generations. In 2012, Ludovic Le Gaillard and Julie Cavanillas put forward the still open hypothesis that the settlement extended further to the northwest (commune of Saussemesnil), which the absence of investigations would not have allowed to be shown.

The very function of the town is still a mystery. Nothing indicates that the natural or geological resources present in the town's environment were exploited intensively. The presence of warehouses and perhaps a mill could point to agricultural activity linked to cereal processing. The study of the successive sediment inputs in the streambed also shows that the land in its catchment area was farmed continuously throughout the whole period of occupation of the ancient settlement. It is also possible that Montaigu served as a stopover town on a route yet to be discovered, along which its cereal production could have been shipped.

Only a sanctuary and public baths are known, whose plans respect the orientation of the road considered to be the main one. No entertainment building has yet been identified at Montaigu, even though tradition mentions one, with several possible locations. There is likewise no evidence for a forum, although such facilities are attested outside the chief towns of civitates, for example at Cherré (Sarthe) or at Verdes (Loir-et-Cher).

In 2024, no cemetery had been located at Montaigu; if the customs in force in the Roman world were observed, such a facility should lie outside the town's boundary (pomerium) but as close to it as possible, along one of the roads entering it. The one identified at the Hameau Gréard, 700 m further south, seems too small to play this role: it is more probably a family cemetery, or one devoted to the burials of the small group of inhabitants of that site.

=== Public monuments ===
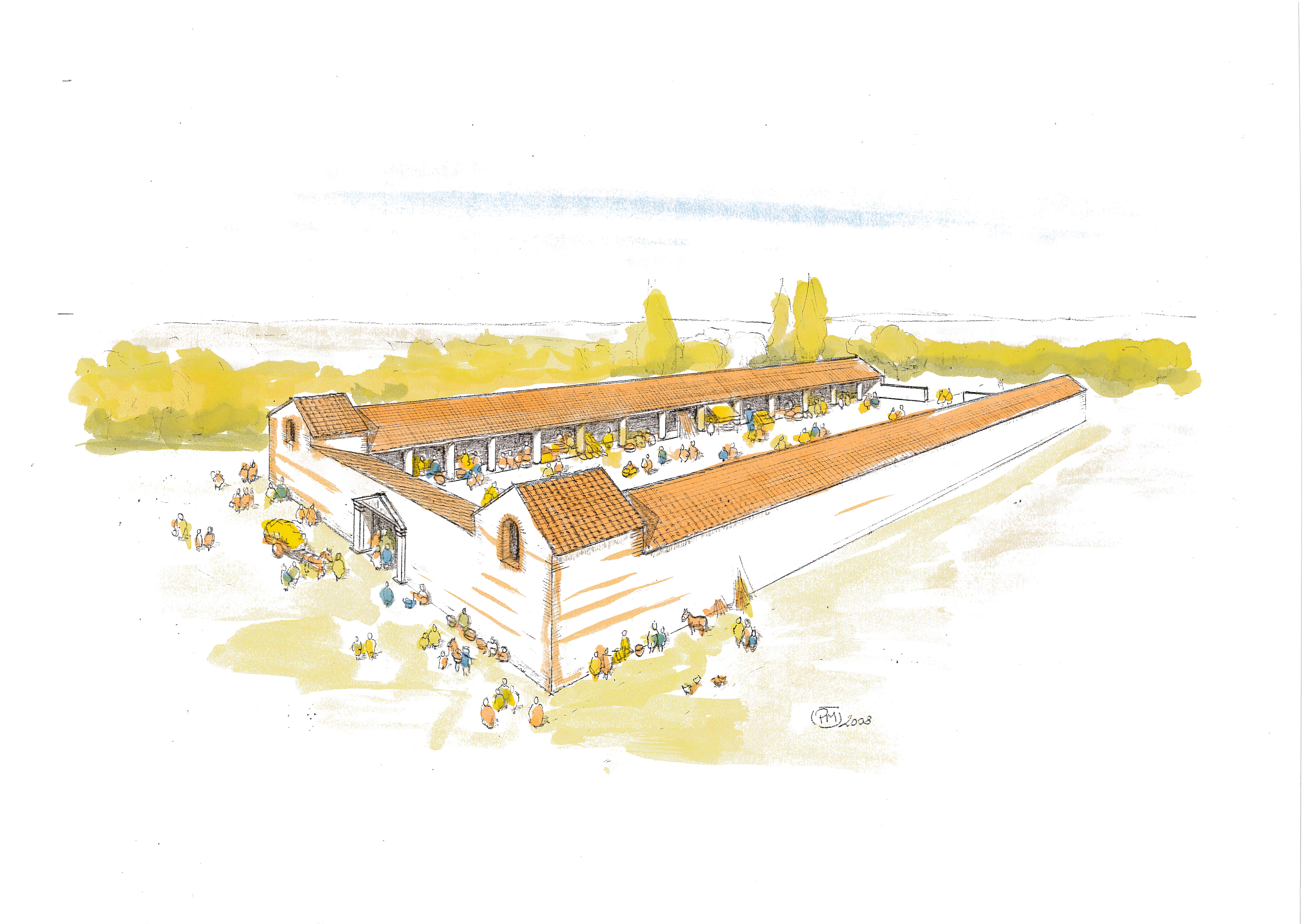
Artist's impression of the market-forum of Cherré.

==== The sanctuary ====
Schematic plan of the sanctuary.

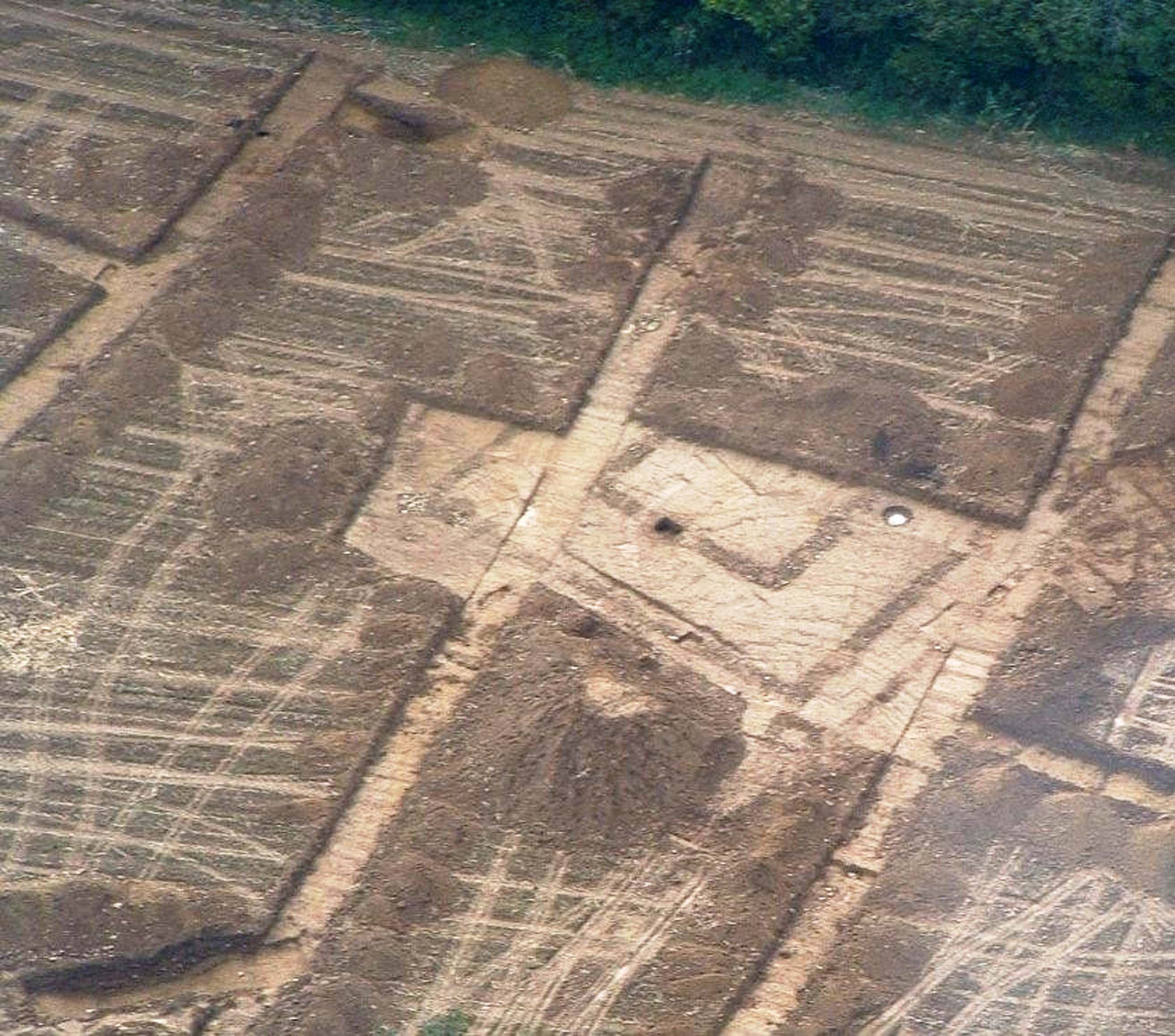
Sanctuary under excavation, seen from the northeast.

The sanctuary of Montaigu-la-Brisette seems to have been active from the middle of the 1st century to the end of the 3rd century. After its abandonment, its materials were almost systematically salvaged, including the limestone blocks that make it distinctive. All that can still be detected are the trenches in which the foundations of its walls were set, which show, in places, that these foundations were made of schist. Only its plan can be reconstructed with relative certainty; hypotheses on the nature, height and above all the possible decoration of its walls remain uncertain.

The sanctuary stands at the highest point of the settlement, on its northwest edge, on a slight shelf of the slope. Its monumentality is reinforced by a schist fill that levels and raises towards the south the promontory on which it stands, offsetting the natural slope. By contrast, the access roads that border it on three sides were laid in trenches 7 to 8 m wide and 0.30 to 0.70 m deep, which further emphasises the monument.

The temple proper, of the fanum type, occupies an almost central place in the sacred area. It consists of a cella 8.5 m on a side and a peripheral gallery of 17.60 × 17 m. A column drum of Valognes limestone, found during ploughing, probably belongs to this gallery and is one of the few remains of the temple's superstructure; it suggests, with all due reservations, a height of the monument above 15 m. One proposed reconstruction shows a building on a square plan, whose cella, covered by a four-sided roof, is surrounded by a lower gallery with columns of the Tuscan order that was also roofed. Although the topography and the remains discovered would allow it, it is not attested at Montaigu-la-Brisette that the temple opened to the east, as is most often the case.

The wall of the peribolos has not been identified along its whole perimeter. However, it does not seem to have been lined by a portico. On its western side, two almost parallel trenches of slightly different lengths (the southwest corner is preserved in each case) show that there were two construction states; a dimension of 90 × 85 m can be assigned to the largest extent of the sacred space, an area of about 7,500 m^{2} compared with about 7,000 m^{2} before enlargement. On this same west side, an exedra in a roughly central position, whose floor is made of pebbles bound with mortar, could be the entrance threshold of the remodelled sanctuary or the base of a bench or a statue.

The sacred enclosure contained structures whose plan and function remain poorly defined. Between the temple and the north wall of the peribolos, a building oriented west–east and measuring 32.50 × 17.50 m could be a reception structure for worshippers. Other features, a wall between this building and the temple and masonry in the southwest corner of the peribolos, are difficult to interpret in the present state of knowledge. The ground was probably covered with a surface of pebbles and tile fragments, parts of which survive in place in one corner of the enclosure.

==== The public baths ====
Evolution of the ancient baths.

Six construction phases of the baths have been identified, marked by successive enlargements for the first four and by a partial dismantling and a reorganisation of the bath building for the last two, which preceded the final abandonment of the complex. Although a relative chronology suggesting an order for the succession of phases is possible, it remains harder to establish an absolute dating of the baths and to place their chronology within the architectural development of the whole settlement, except for their initial construction and their dismantling.

In their initial configuration (state 1), which may go back to the second half of the 1st century, the baths consisted of a single building of reduced size, with only a few rooms, two of them heated (remains of hypocausts and a possible praefurnium), on the flank of the left bank of the stream.

In a second period (states 2 and 3), the building grew and became more complex, occupying the whole space separating the first rooms from the watercourse. A channel was built in which the stream flowed, its bed thus being backfilled and covered. On this fill was built a natatio (an unheated swimming pool) measuring 108 m^{2} and one metre deep, reached by a staircase in its southeast corner. A new backfill of this area made it possible to install a palaestra with a carefully levelled floor, covering 770 m^{2}, at the centre of which the open-air pool was rebuilt. Nothing allows us to say that the stream passing under the baths contributed in any way to their water supply, although doubt remains for the palaestra: a pit in the northwest corner of the pool can be interpreted as a reservoir in which stream water was stored and then drawn to fill the pool. By contrast, it is certain that the drain water from the pool, and doubtless from part of the bath building, flowed into the stream downstream of the baths. This characteristic also explains why the baths were not built further upstream: the houses, located downstream, could not have used water polluted by the effluents of the baths. More generally, no other information is available on the water supply systems; had the bath building been supplied by the stream, the difference in altitude of 2 to 3 m would have required lifting machines.

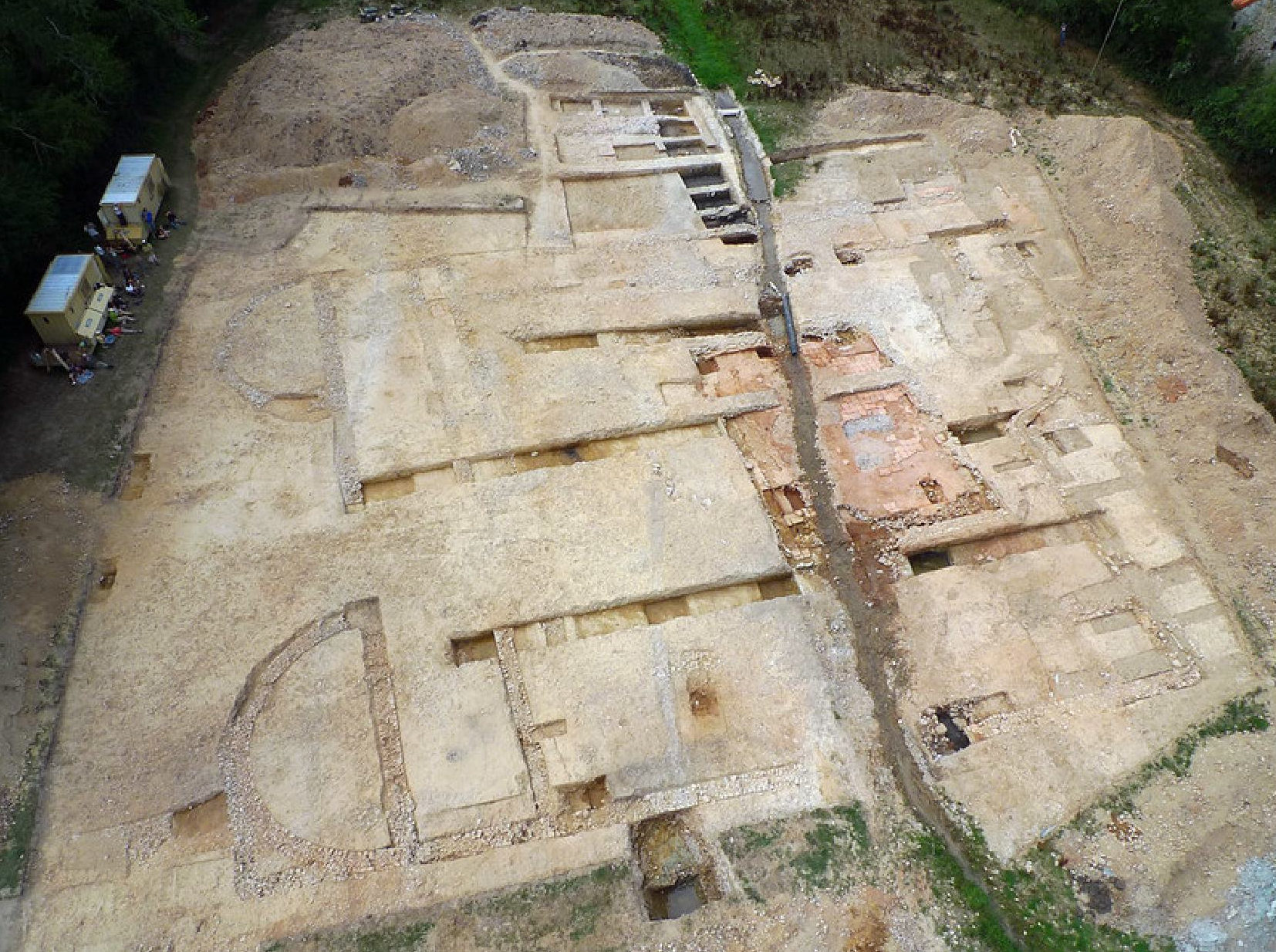
Baths under excavation, seen from the east.

The third phase of construction is marked by the enlargement of the palaestra (it now covered nearly 1,100 m^{2}) through the addition of a portico on three of its sides, and by the building to the south of a structure measuring 33 × 7.70 m, evoking a civil basilica with two apses but which may have served as a gymnasium or a library (state 4), as at Drevant; gardens adjoining the eastern part of the palaestra were laid out at a date that is hard to define. The construction of a large block of buildings east of the bath complex, comprising an apodyterium and two frigidaria and forming a new entrance, may date from this time, but its chronology is not secure, since at the same time the portico of the palaestra began to be dismantled (state 5). In this configuration the baths covered a total estimated area of 2,400 m^{2}, or even 3,000 m^{2} including the entrance courtyard east of the bath building. The presence of the palaestra and the basilica, in the extension of the bath building, gives the whole a north–south axis of symmetry, like the Baths of Nero in Rome, a plan widely diffused in the Roman Empire. This symmetry was not present in the earliest states.

The last stage (state 6), dated to the second half of the 3rd century, saw a very significant reduction in the scale of the baths: the pool was closed off, the porticoes dismantled, and the palaestra and gardens abandoned; all the activity of the complex seems to have been concentrated in a few remodelled rooms whose plan tends to resemble the first state of the bath building, for an area of about 300 m^{2}.

=== Management of the stream ===
In the first decades of the Common Era, the floodplain ("major bed") of the ruisseau aux Presles, whose present source lies about fifty metres upstream of the ancient site, was wider (10 m) and deeper (1.30 m) than in the contemporary period, in a meadow environment tending to be marshy, where water stagnated.

Around the second half of the 2nd century, the watercourse underwent major works that seem to have remained in operation until the first decades of the 3rd century. The architectural characteristics of these works suggest that they were part of the town's general urban plan.

A retaining wall of stone and clay, probably crossed by a wooden pipe or plug, dams the stream (a north–south road was laid along its crest). Upstream, the reservoir thus formed measured about 40 m long and 6 to 7 m wide, with a depth of 0.60 m. Downstream of the reservoir, the stream was channelled to a width of about 0.60 to 0.70 m over a length of 47 m; this millrace, whose walls appear vertical and held by sheet piles, very probably fed a mill on the north bank, even though no convincing remains of it survive; the mill certainly had two states (a timber building, then a masonry building). On either side, two ditches parallel to the stream provided drainage. The reservoir could also, with all due reservations, have been used for fish farming.

Filtering device at the entrance of the underground channel.

The construction of the palaestra made it necessary to level and raise the ground above the stream by about 2 to 3 m, and therefore to carry the stream through the layer of fill beneath the palaestra by means of an underground channel. This is built of masonry, vaulted in its middle section, with tightly fitted unmortared blocks on either side, and has no inspection shaft. It is 0.30 to 0.50 m wide and at most 0.40 m high, and its winding course is doubtless that of the natural channel it replaces.

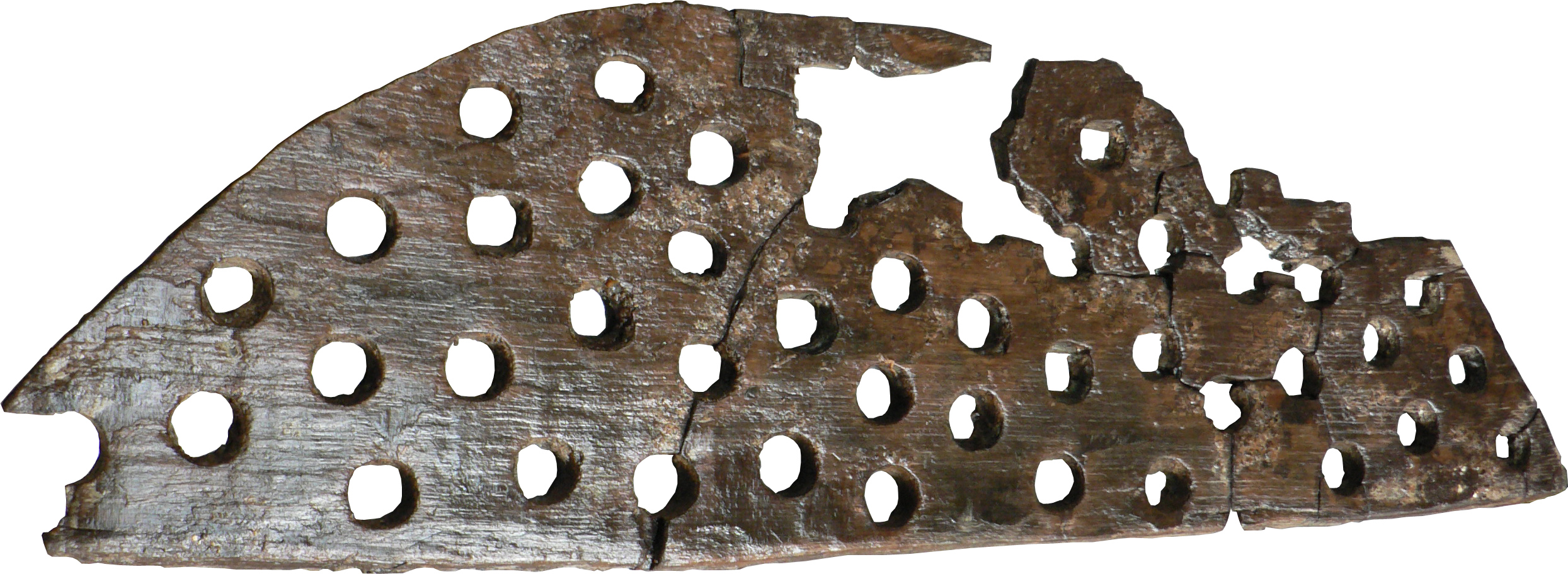
Reconstructed wooden filter grille.

A device, probably meant to filter the water to keep plant debris from invading the underground conduit, was installed at the entrance of the underground conduit, in the west wall of the palaestra. It consists of a brick arch with an opening 0.75 m wide and 0.65 m high resting on limestone blocks; the opening was closed by a segment of an oak disc matching the shape of the arch and pierced with holes 2 cm across.

Downstream of the palaestra, the stream no longer seems to have been managed, apart from side walls that doubtless correspond to its passage through the gardens adjoining the palaestra.

In the second half of the 3rd century, silt deposits seem to have filled the reservoir and invaded the millrace; the mill was probably dismantled and the retaining dam breached, before a new channel was cut between this dam and the palaestra and, finally, a last channel restored the flow of water from the disused reservoir to the old millrace and then through the rubble of the palaestra fill, itself also abandoned.

=== Housing, warehouses and crafts ===
Houses, warehouses and craft structures were rebuilt and modified throughout the period in which the ancient town was active. Within the settlement they occupied well-defined sectors, located with few exceptions between the sanctuary to the north and the stream to the south.

None of these buildings has been exhaustively excavated so as to uncover all of its remains. The work consisted either of test pits laid out on a defined grid or of partial excavations linked to the study of neighbouring structures. In these conditions the plan, evolution and function of the buildings often remain hypothetical.

==== Dwellings ====
Most of the buildings identified as potentially residential occupy the space between the sanctuary and the east–west road regarded as the main one in the town's network, as well as the space between that road and the stream. The study of housing types shows that their architecture was very varied.

Different building methods are found, with foundations of sandstone blocks, schist masonry, but also timber-framed houses, and sometimes several types used together, with a timber frame serving as a "skeleton" for earth walls. The same diversity is seen in the plans of the houses, where these can be identified. The buildings along the so-called main road, on the south-facing left bank of the stream, enjoyed optimal sunshine and their main façades seem accordingly to be aligned and turned towards the south; some of these southern façades were clearly completed, or even linked together, by colonnaded galleries. Higher up the slope the plan of the dwellings seems less complex, but it also includes annex buildings of still undetermined function (post holes attest to their presence) and gardens. Ditches dug around the properties, some of which seem to have remained in place throughout the settlement's period of activity, may have served to mark property boundaries.

From the end of the 2nd century, however, house plans seem to have become simpler, with the dismantling of the porticoes and the destruction of interior partitions, or even total reconstruction on a simpler quadrangular scheme, while building techniques seem to have become less elaborate, with more frequent use of "coarser" materials such as puddingstone. Change was constant, and some dwellings went through as many as six successive phases during the period in which the town was occupied.

On the right bank of the stream, two groups of complex masonry structures lie on the margins of, or even beyond, the most densely urbanised area. At least one of them may consist of buildings linked to an early agricultural holding, marked by a network of ditches (1st century); it was entirely reorganised and its occupation continued until the end of the 3rd or the beginning of the 4th century. The second group has its own domestic oven, evidence of the comfortable circumstances of its occupants.

East of the D 63, the plots at the level of the stream, south of the Hameau Dorey, show remains of ancient works (poorly characterised walls and their robbing trenches, a section of road). Although they are difficult to interpret, these remains show that here, as south of the stream and the baths, ancient occupation was not confined to the most densely urbanised core of the settlement.

==== Warehouses and craft activities ====
A structure set on the north bank of the channelled stream, downstream of the reservoir, is considered to be a mill, although no remains formally confirm its use. More than the discovery nearby of millstones, which seem rather to have been domestic and hand-operated, it is the presence of a piece of wood (part of a water-lifting machine or of the mill itself) and the building's evident link with the hydraulic works, which form a millrace, that support this hypothesis. The mill seems to have been first a timber structure 3 m on a side, replaced later by a masonry building measuring 6.20 × 4.60 m.

The warehouses, two in number according to the most recent data, are simple rectangular structures set on the right bank of the stream; post holes suggest that these buildings were not completely enclosed. It is tempting to see in them grain-storage buildings whose location was carefully chosen, facing the mill that may have stood on the other bank. They were probably built in the second half of the 2nd century, the most active phase of the town's development. One of them is accompanied by a circular stone well 1.70 m in diameter, whose presence less than a hundred metres from the stream is hard to explain unless the inhabitants had doubts about the potability of running water.

In the part of the town between the sanctuary and the main road, especially in the northwest and southeast, the evidence seems to point to a smaller footprint of residential buildings in favour of craft or utilitarian structures: traces of ovens or hearths, ditches delimiting possible gardens, and a few fragments of forge slag. The activities carried out there, potentially polluting (metalworking, firing and smoking generate smells and smoke), may for that reason have been relegated to the margins of the town. This is notably the case of several lime kilns attested immediately west of the west wall of the sanctuary's peribolos, at the edge of the town. These kilns were dug in simple pits, without masonry structures. The two largest (5 × 4 and 3.50 × 3.10 m) may be linked to the construction of the temple and its outbuildings; the smaller ones, set around the edge of the former, would have been put into service later during repairs. The lime from these kilns, partly produced from the waste of the dressed limestone used for the temple, could have been used in other sectors of the settlement, without however meeting all its needs.

Less than a hundred metres south of the sanctuary, two zones where fragments of weathered schist were extracted can, because of their small size, be regarded as supplementary sources of building materials.

=== Road network of the settlement ===
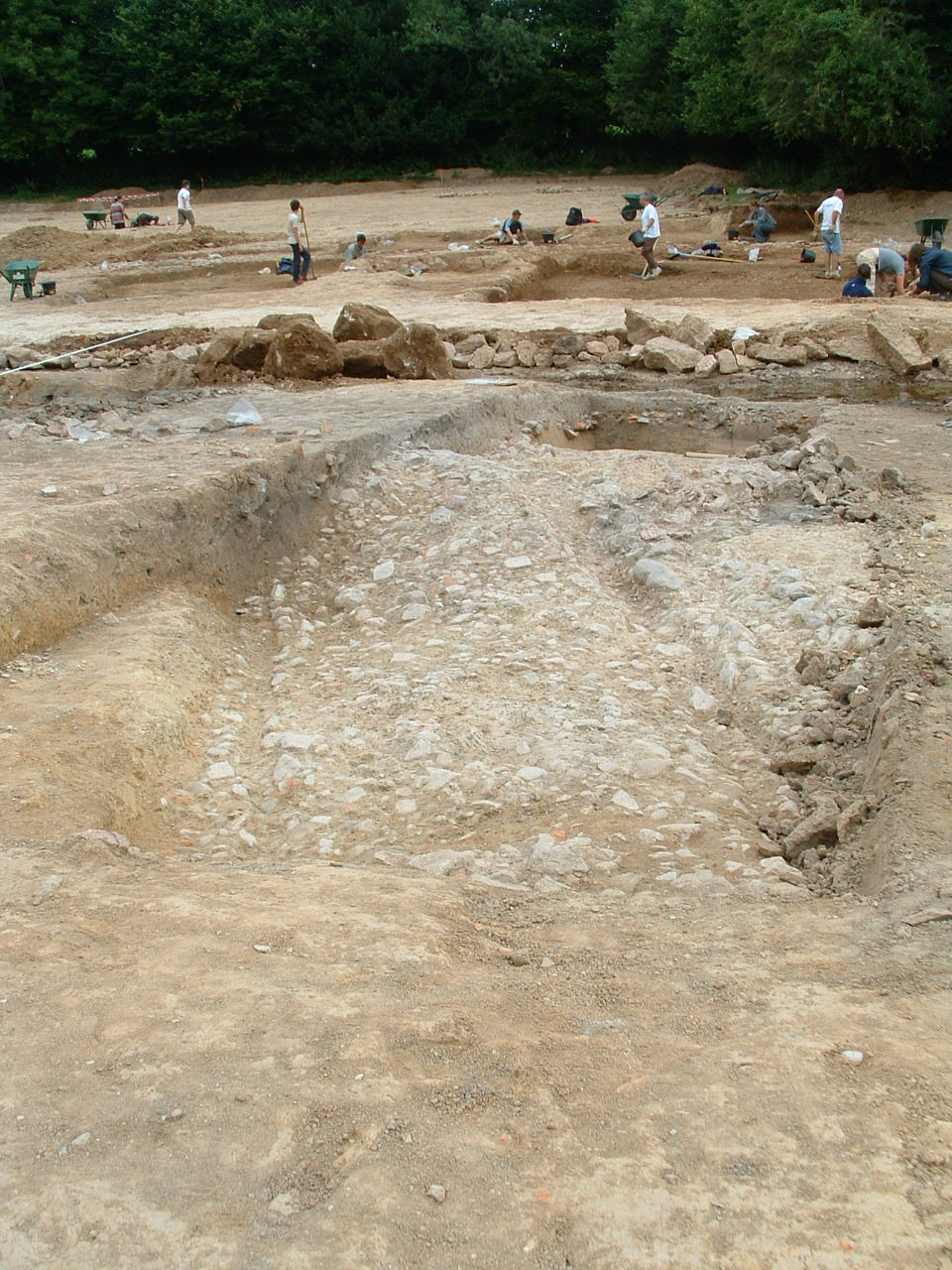
Road with ruts under excavation.

The general organisation of the road network, doubtless partly rather free, remains hard to grasp and certainly does not correspond to an orthogonal scheme of the kind usually presented for Roman settlements. The network of Montaigu-la-Brisette seems in fact to be made up of groups whose orientations are either diffuse or divergent. Moreover, it is not possible to attach a group of roads with homogeneous orientations to a precise period of construction. Finally, the siting of the town on a slope makes a regularly laid-out road system practically impossible. One common feature nevertheless seems to emerge: the surface of all these roads consists of a mixture of pebbles and tile fragments resting either directly on the schist bedrock or on a foundation of rough rubble.

One road, probably the main one, is oriented east–west (decumanus); it is laid on a shelf between the foot of the north slope and the bottom of the stream valley. A band of pebbles persisting in the ploughed soil suggests that it very probably continues west, doubtless to join the route linking Alauna to the northern coast of the Cotentin. To the east its course is unknown: it may not extend beyond the baths, which it possibly serves, or it may continue across the Val de Saire to the east coast of the peninsula. Its width of 10 m, at least twice that of the other known roads of the settlement, confirms in any case the dominant status it held in the network: some of the roads of Montaigu seem to be organised around the course of this main artery.

The peribolos of the temple seems to be framed by three roads set in trenches, whose carriageway is about 3 m wide. Identified to the north, west and south, they outline a block, perhaps older than the foundation of the temple, in which the temple was later inserted. The west road is perpendicular to the main street of the settlement; nothing proves it, but if it continued between the temple and the main road, it could have formed the preferred access to the sanctuary.

Other road sections are also identified between the sanctuary and the main road; their winding course and smaller width, sometimes less than a metre, suggest that they were perhaps lanes serving the houses or the utilitarian buildings, but that they did not help to structure the road system or delimit blocks or districts. Their layout seems to result from opportunities linked to the location of the points to be served and to the topography of the area.

These three types of road can be dated to the period of the town's rise and prosperity (from the middle of the 1st century to the middle of the 3rd century).

West of the baths, a north–south road crosses the stream at a ford, at the level of the retaining wall that dams the watercourse. It seems to have been created later, between the 2nd century and the very beginning of the 4th century.

Lastly, other roads appear to be very late access routes to the various structures, laid out as needed when the town was being dismantled and its materials recovered from the end of the 3rd century. One of them, on the right bank of the stream, cuts through the remains of an earlier construction, a dismantled warehouse.

=== Finds ===
The archaeological material found on the site and its surroundings is very varied in nature. However, the schistose nature of the soil gives it a natural acidity that is unfavourable to the preservation of certain remains, including bones.

Apart from the pieces from the oldest excavations, which are generally scattered among private collections, most of the material from the Montaigu site is held at the Maison de l'Ange (in the commune of Saint-André-de-Bohon), property of the departmental council of the Manche.

==== Statues and figurines ====
In 1839, Charles de Gerville reported the discovery of a white clay statuette about ten centimetres high, with its head missing; he saw in it a depiction of Venus Anadyomene of a type known in the Nord-Cotentin and widely found in Gallo-Roman sanctuaries, but the discovery is poorly documented and imprecisely located on the site (probably in the fill of the reservoir).

The small cemetery of the Hameau Gréard yielded bronze figurines, some of which represent horses. Even though they were found during unauthorised digs and the archaeological context is unknown, they were certainly ritual offerings.

==== Pottery ====
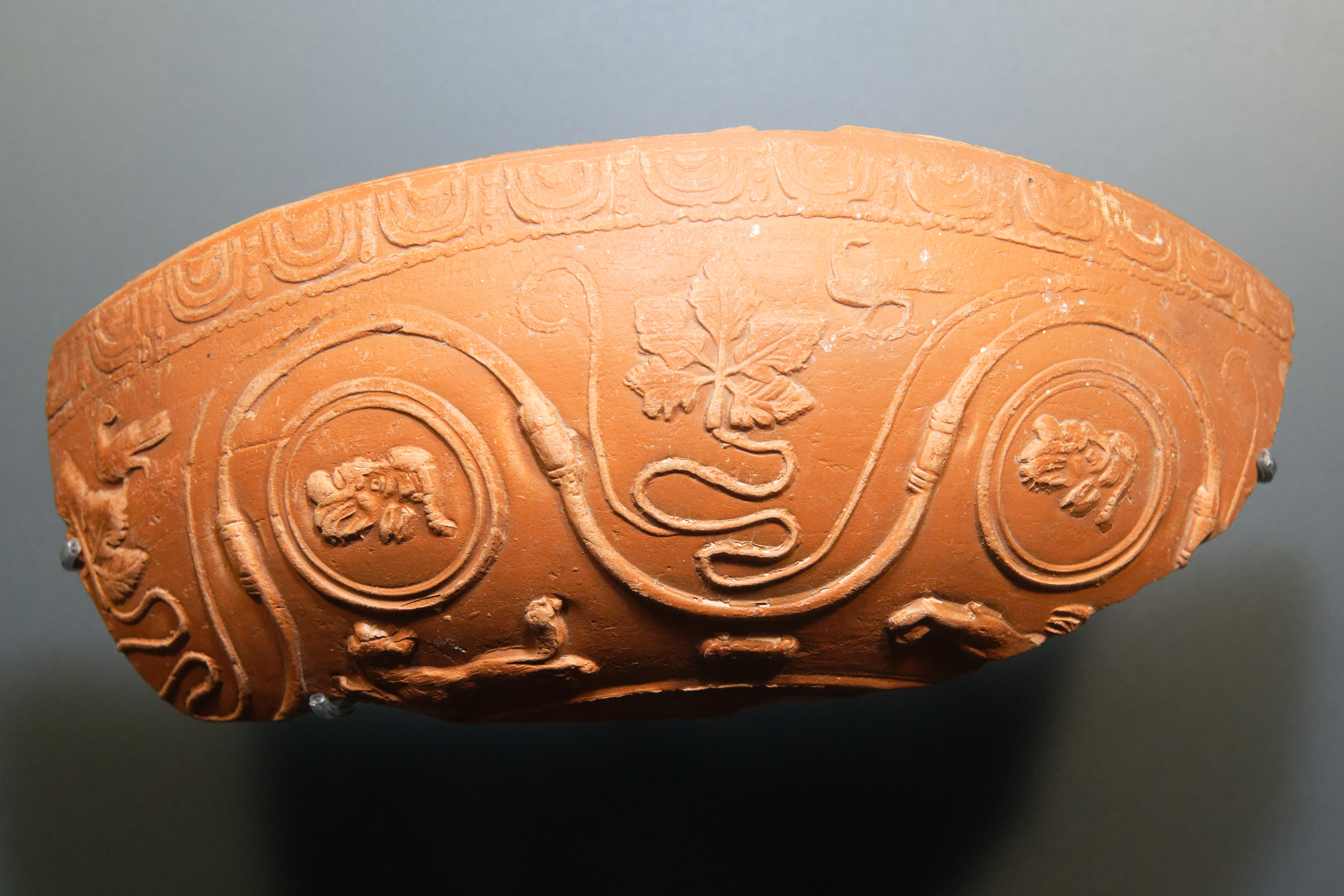
Dragendorff 37 bowl (samian ware from Lezoux), a type found at Montaigu.

Known origins of the pottery found at Montaigu. Most points do not mark precise locations but the "centre" of larger production areas.

A study of 52,000 pottery sherds found on the site helps to establish its chronology: almost all of the material falls within a range between AD 60 or 70 and AD 270 or 280.

The objects found can be classified into two broad categories. Domestic ware (tableware and kitchenware) includes plates, bowls, cups, mortars, pots and cooking pots, among others; funnels are more frequently represented than on other sites. The transport containers are exclusively amphorae.

The origin of the pottery is very varied, with a predominance of Unelli products and a notable, although smaller, proportion of Bajocasses and Viducasses wares, whether common ware, fine ware or probable imitations of terra nigra. A few sherds of Black Burnished ware of Romano-British origin, samian ware from north-eastern, southern or central Gaul (Lezoux workshops), and amphorae from Baetica (type Dressel 20 among others) and Narbonensis have also been found, testifying to trade links with these provinces.

==== Glassware ====
The almost 200 glass fragments collected in situ during the excavations and test pits for the years 2002 to 2004 alone have been studied in detail. They cover the whole period of activity of the site and include fragments of very varied vessels in blown glass commonly found in north-western Gaul, as well as window glass characteristic of the High Empire. Tableware glass, which differs according to where it was found, doubtless reflects both the diversity of production places and the social status of its users.

The peripheral site of the Hameau Gréard yielded fragments of domestic glass in the settlement area and glass of probably ritual function in the cemetery.

==== Coins and miscellaneous metal objects ====
In 1828, Charles de Gerville reported the discovery on the site of a little under thirty coins, one dated to the reign of Trajan and another to that of Antoninus Pius. About fifteen Gaulish coins come from the excavations at the sanctuary, and more than 500 Roman coins come from a peripheral site (the Hameau Gréard). These coins are in private collections; only part of them is accessible and some pieces, in too poor condition, cannot be used. The dates, necessarily incomplete, range from 88 BC (Roman Republic) for the oldest to AD 205 (reign of Septimius Severus) for the most recent; the mints of these coins cannot be identified.

Wheel-shaped pendants (rouelles), two bracelets and pieces of horse harness were collected in the 1980s on the site, in the sanctuary area, but the exact archaeological context in which these items were found is unknown, which complicates their interpretation.

== Peripheral sites ==
Location and function of the peripheral sites.

Peripheral sites, located at short distances (a few hundred metres or a few kilometres) from the ancient settlement in the strict sense, can hardly be separated from it, with which they undoubtedly maintained close links, and they fall within its sphere of influence even if their function is not always clearly established.

=== Hameau Gréard ===
The site of the Hameau Gréard, one kilometre south of the ancient settlement in the same commune of Montaigu, yielded a cremation cemetery of a small ten or so burials, perhaps family in character, dating from the 1st century BC to a large part of the 2nd century AD, in two main phases of occupation; the burials were accompanied by bronze figurines found by individuals carrying out clandestine surveys; other pieces of furnishing were not retained in the study because their provenance or description was too uncertain. The burials were perhaps marked by a stone placed on the ground directly above the buried urn. On the same site, ditches suggest the laying out of enclosures or an agricultural field system; these structures are accompanied by remains of an open settlement occupied from the middle of the 2nd century to the middle of the 3rd century. This group suggests a satellite settlement of the ancient town, perhaps contributing to its supply of agricultural products.

=== Pas du Vivray ===
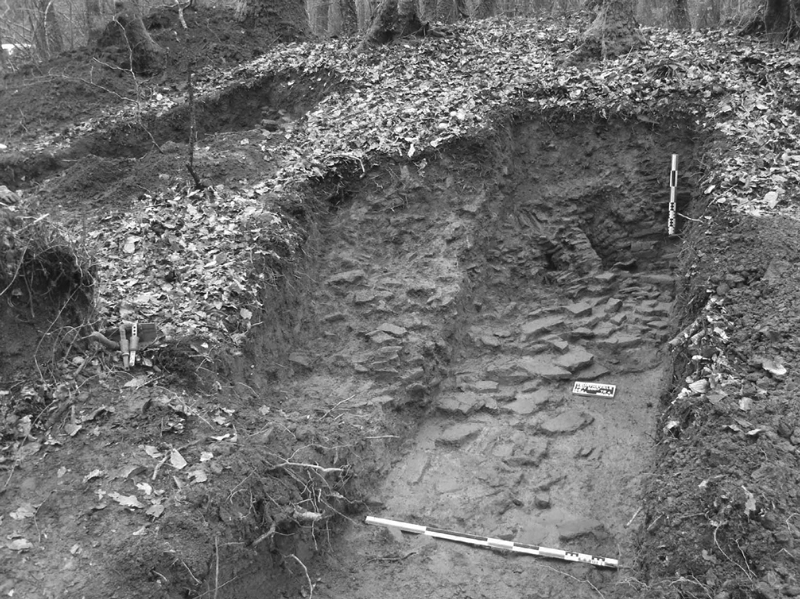
Tile kiln under excavation at Teurthéville-Bocage.

In the commune of Teurthéville-Bocage, in the Barnavast woods, the site of the Pas du Vivray lies 2 km northeast of the ancient settlement. It was already mentioned by Charles de Gerville in 1828 and then by Frédéric Scuvée in 1979, and was the subject of archaeological test pits in 2007. The production of architectural terracotta is attested there by the presence of clay extraction pits and by the discovery of two firing kilns and of varied finished products (roofing tegulae or imbrices, paving tiles or tubuli used in the baths and bathhouses). This workshop would have been active from the end of the 1st century to the first half of the 3rd century, but this dating hypothesis remains fragile.

=== Le Douetty (Brillevast) ===
Another production workshop for architectural terracotta has been identified at the place called le Douetty, at Brillevast, 4 km north of Montaigu. The site was discovered in 1982 when a pipeline was laid and brought to light very many tegulae. Two groups combining dwellings and kilns lie close together, but they do not seem to be contemporary. The older of the units appears to be Augustan, before the site was reorganised with the construction of the second unit around the middle of the 1st century. Activity ceased at the beginning of the 2nd century. Production seems to have been mainly directed towards roofing materials, with a strong predominance of tegulae.

The physical (size, shape) and chemical (constituents and their respective proportions) characteristics of the architectural terracotta make it possible to distinguish the output of Teurthéville from that of Brillevast, and manufacturing techniques appear more sophisticated in the latter case. The question of how these products were distributed to places of use (settlements, for example) has not been formally settled, although architectural terracotta found at the sites of Alauna and Montaigu-la-Brisette meets the characteristics of the output of Teurthéville and Brillevast.

=== Priory of Barnavast ===
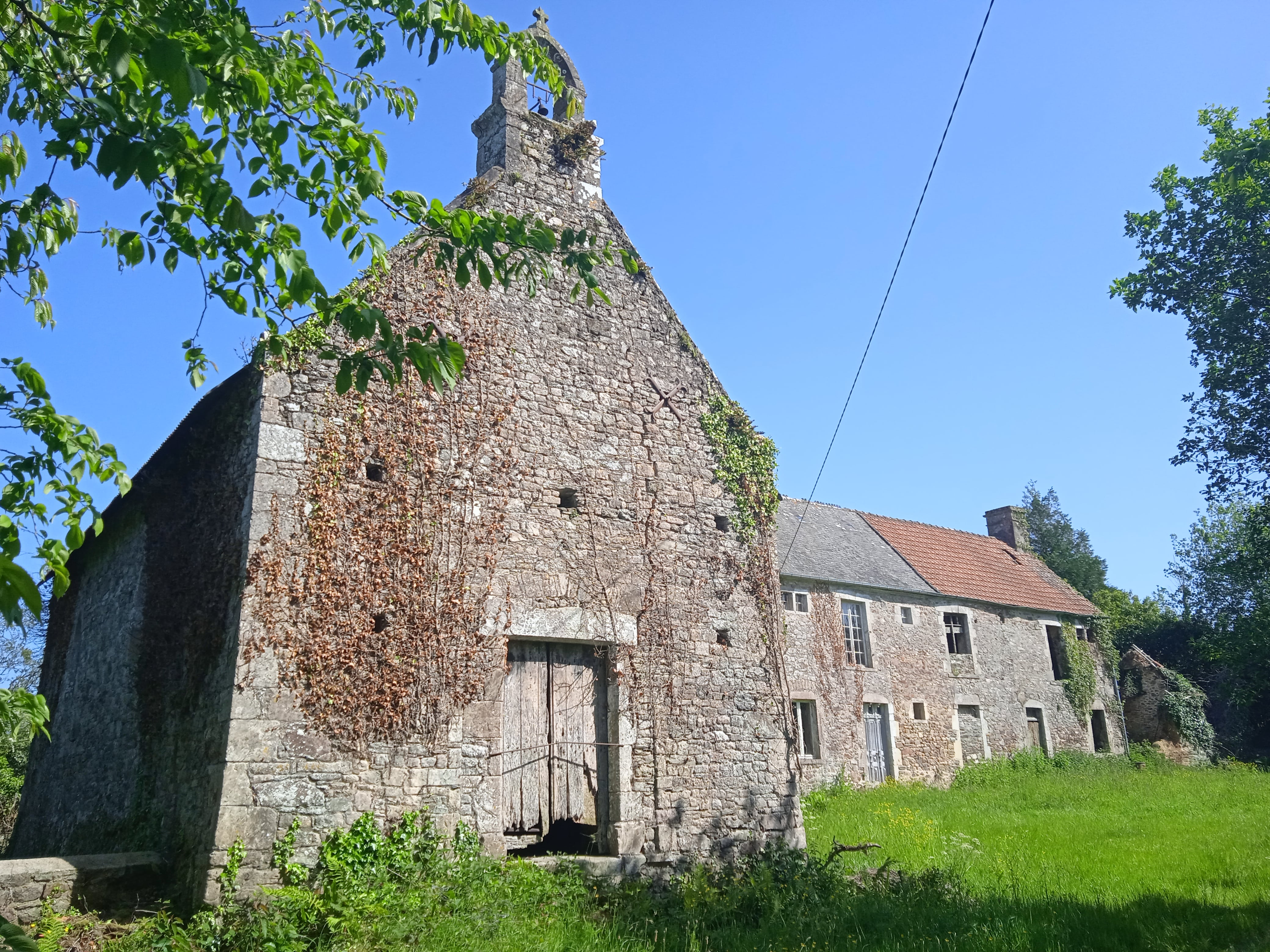
Barnavast priory.

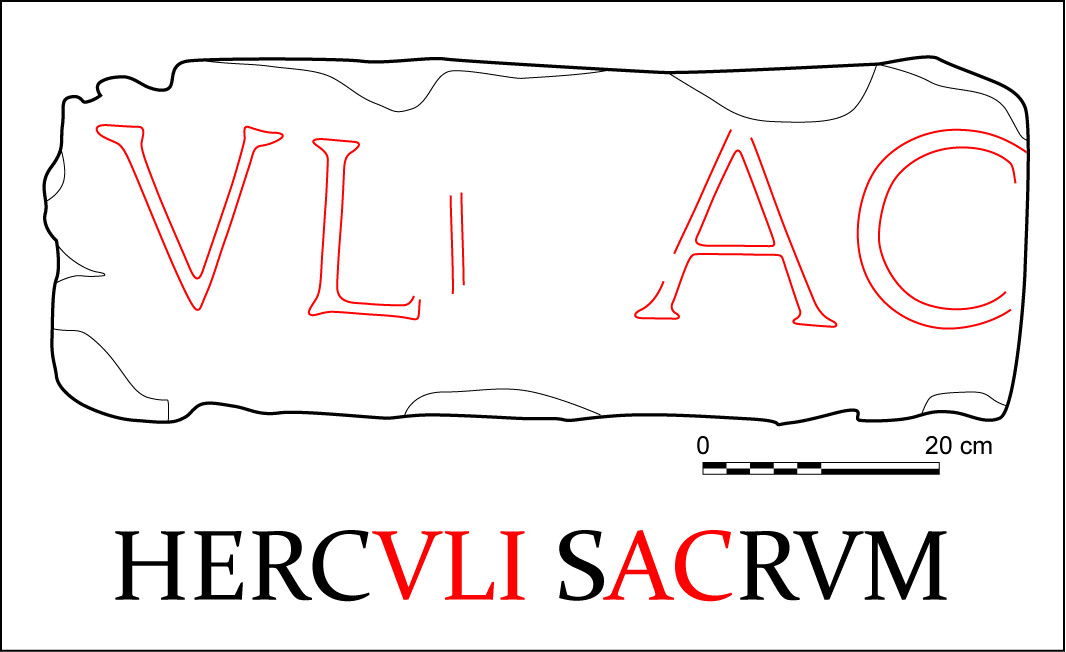
Reconstruction of the inscription of Barnavast priory.

A reused block of Valognes limestone (81.5 × 30 × 45 cm) is set upside down in a wall of the chapel of Saint Martin of the priory of Barnavast at Teurthéville-Bocage. The chapel, which can be dated to the 11th century, lies a little over 2 km north-north-east of the site. The block, of which the only restorable parts are [HERC]VLI[S]AC[RUM], could, with all due reservations, come from the sanctuary of Montaigu-la-Brisette if the inscription it bears were indeed, once completed by other lost blocks, a dedication to Hercules. The walls of the chapel also contain other reused ancient architectural elements (a block with a hole for a lewis, a reworked cornice). The inverted position of the reused block may be accidental, simply reflecting the illiteracy of the mason who set it, or deliberate, forming part of a kind of desacralisation of the block.

The presence around the chapel of signs of Gallo-Roman occupation (fragments of architectural terracotta and pottery) led Frédéric Scuvée to conclude in 1979 that the priory was built on the site of an "enormous Gallo-Roman villa whose foundations sleep under the pastures all around the old farm". At the present state of knowledge this claim cannot be verified, and it is not possible to know the nature or importance of this ancient site; the possible reuse of a block from a monument at Montaigu nevertheless suggests that the two sites, Barnavast and the Hameau Dorey, are linked.
