= Gonneville =

Gonneville may refer to:

== Places ==
- Gonneville, Manche, a commune in the Manche département of France.
- Gonneville-en-Auge, a commune in the Calvados département of France.
- Gonneville-sur-Honfleur, a commune in the Calvados département of France.
- Gonneville-sur-Mer, a commune in the Calvados département of France.

== People ==
- Binot Paulmier de Gonneville
