= Gonneville-le-Theil =

- Commune
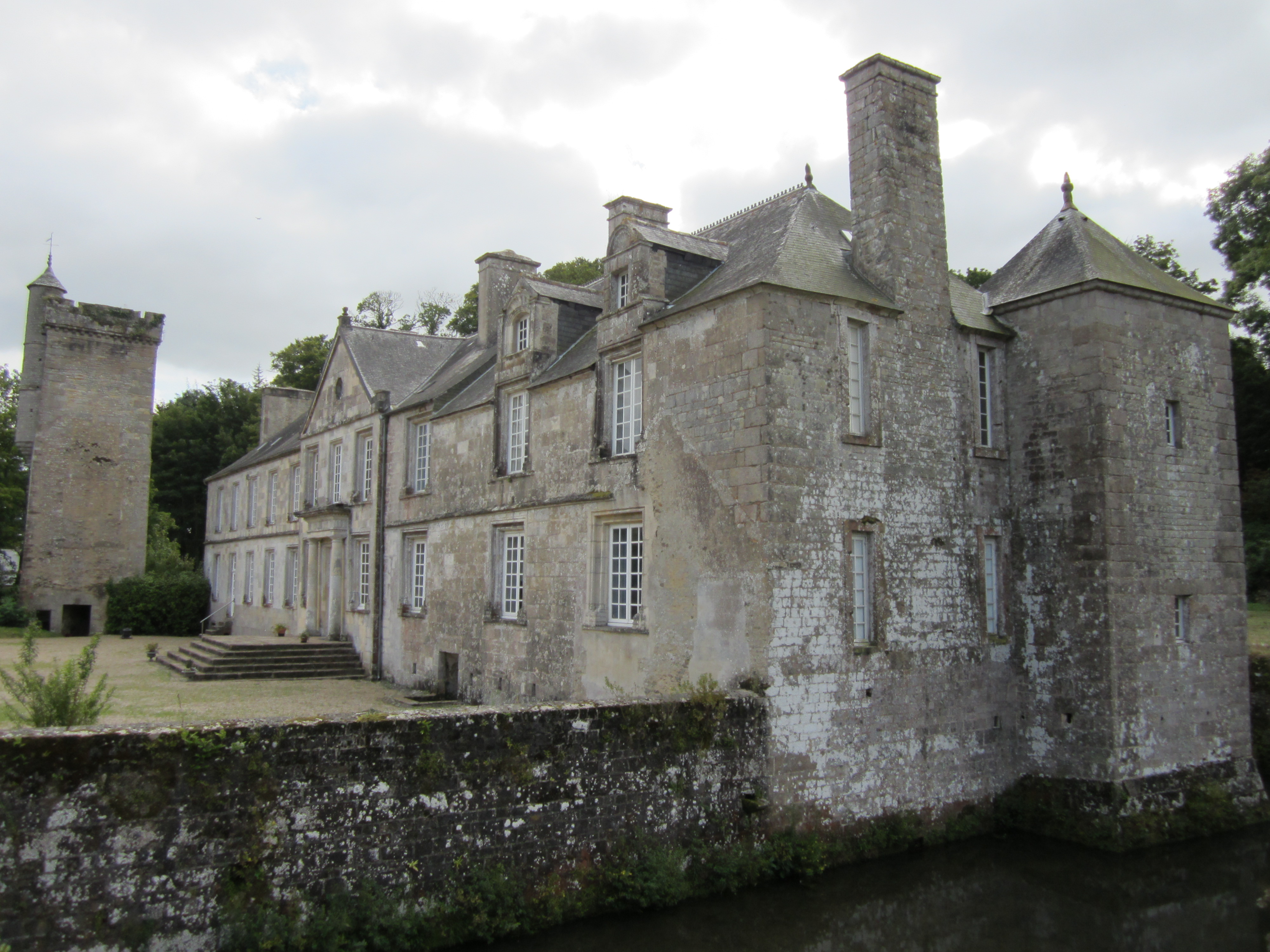
- The chateau in Gonneville
- Location of Gonneville-le-Theil
- Location within France Location within Normandy
- Coordinates: 49°38′17″N 1°27′58″W
- Country: France
- Region: Normandy
- Department: Manche
- Arrondissement: Cherbourg
- Canton: Val-de-Saire
- Intercommunality: CA Cotentin

Government
  - Mayor (2021–2026): Philippe Le Clech
- Area^{1}: 29.17 km^{2} (11.26 sq mi)
- Population (2023): 1,513
  - Density: 51.87/km^{2} (134.3/sq mi)
- Time zone: UTC+01:00 (CET)
  - Summer (DST): UTC+02:00 (CEST)
- INSEE/Postal code: 50209 /50330
- ^{1} French Land Register data, which excludes lakes, ponds, glaciers > 1 km^{2} (0.386 sq mi or 247 acres) and river estuaries.

Gonneville-le-Theil (French pronunciation: [ɡɔnvil lə tɛj]) is a commune in the department of Manche, northwestern France. The municipality was established on 1 January 2016 by merger of the former communes of Gonneville and Le Theil.

== Geography ==
=== Climate ===
Gonneville-le-Theil has an oceanic climate (Köppen climate classification Cfb). The average annual temperature in Gonneville-le-Theil is 10.7 °C (51.3 °F). The average annual rainfall is 919.7 mm (36.21 in) with December as the wettest month. The temperatures are highest on average in August, at around 16.6 °C (61.9 °F), and lowest in February, at around 5.5 °C (41.9 °F). The highest temperature ever recorded in Gonneville-le-Theil was 33.7 °C (92.7 °F) on 19 July 2006; the coldest temperature ever recorded was −12.3 °C (9.9 °F) on 17 January 1985.

Climate data for Gonneville-le-Theil (1981–2010 averages, extremes 1959−present)
Month	Jan	Feb	Mar	Apr	May	Jun	Jul	Aug	Sep	Oct	Nov	Dec	Year
Record high °C (°F)	14.9 (58.8)	18.9 (66.0)	23.7 (74.7)	23.9 (75.0)	28.6 (83.5)	31.7 (89.1)	33.7 (92.7)	33.4 (92.1)	29.3 (84.7)	27.0 (80.6)	20.8 (69.4)	15.9 (60.6)	33.7 (92.7)
Mean daily maximum °C (°F)	7.8 (46.0)	7.8 (46.0)	9.9 (49.8)	11.8 (53.2)	14.9 (58.8)	17.7 (63.9)	19.8 (67.6)	19.9 (67.8)	18.0 (64.4)	14.8 (58.6)	11.0 (51.8)	8.5 (47.3)	13.5 (56.3)
Daily mean °C (°F)	5.7 (42.3)	5.5 (41.9)	7.3 (45.1)	8.8 (47.8)	11.7 (53.1)	14.3 (57.7)	16.4 (61.5)	16.6 (61.9)	14.9 (58.8)	12.1 (53.8)	8.7 (47.7)	6.4 (43.5)	10.7 (51.3)
Mean daily minimum °C (°F)	3.5 (38.3)	3.2 (37.8)	4.6 (40.3)	5.7 (42.3)	8.5 (47.3)	10.9 (51.6)	13.0 (55.4)	13.3 (55.9)	11.8 (53.2)	9.4 (48.9)	6.4 (43.5)	4.2 (39.6)	7.9 (46.2)
Record low °C (°F)	−12.3 (9.9)	−9.9 (14.2)	−4.6 (23.7)	−3.1 (26.4)	0.1 (32.2)	2.9 (37.2)	6.0 (42.8)	6.3 (43.3)	3.5 (38.3)	−0.6 (30.9)	−4.0 (24.8)	−8.8 (16.2)	−12.3 (9.9)
Average precipitation mm (inches)	100.8 (3.97)	69.6 (2.74)	69.8 (2.75)	61.8 (2.43)	58.1 (2.29)	49.1 (1.93)	46.4 (1.83)	51.4 (2.02)	74.4 (2.93)	111.6 (4.39)	113.1 (4.45)	113.6 (4.47)	919.7 (36.21)
Average precipitation days (≥ 1.0 mm)	14.5	11.4	11.6	10.1	9.4	7.9	7.9	8.2	10.1	14.7	15.9	15.1	136.8
Source: Meteociel

== See also ==
- Communes of the Manche department
