= Montaigu-la-Brisette =

- Commune
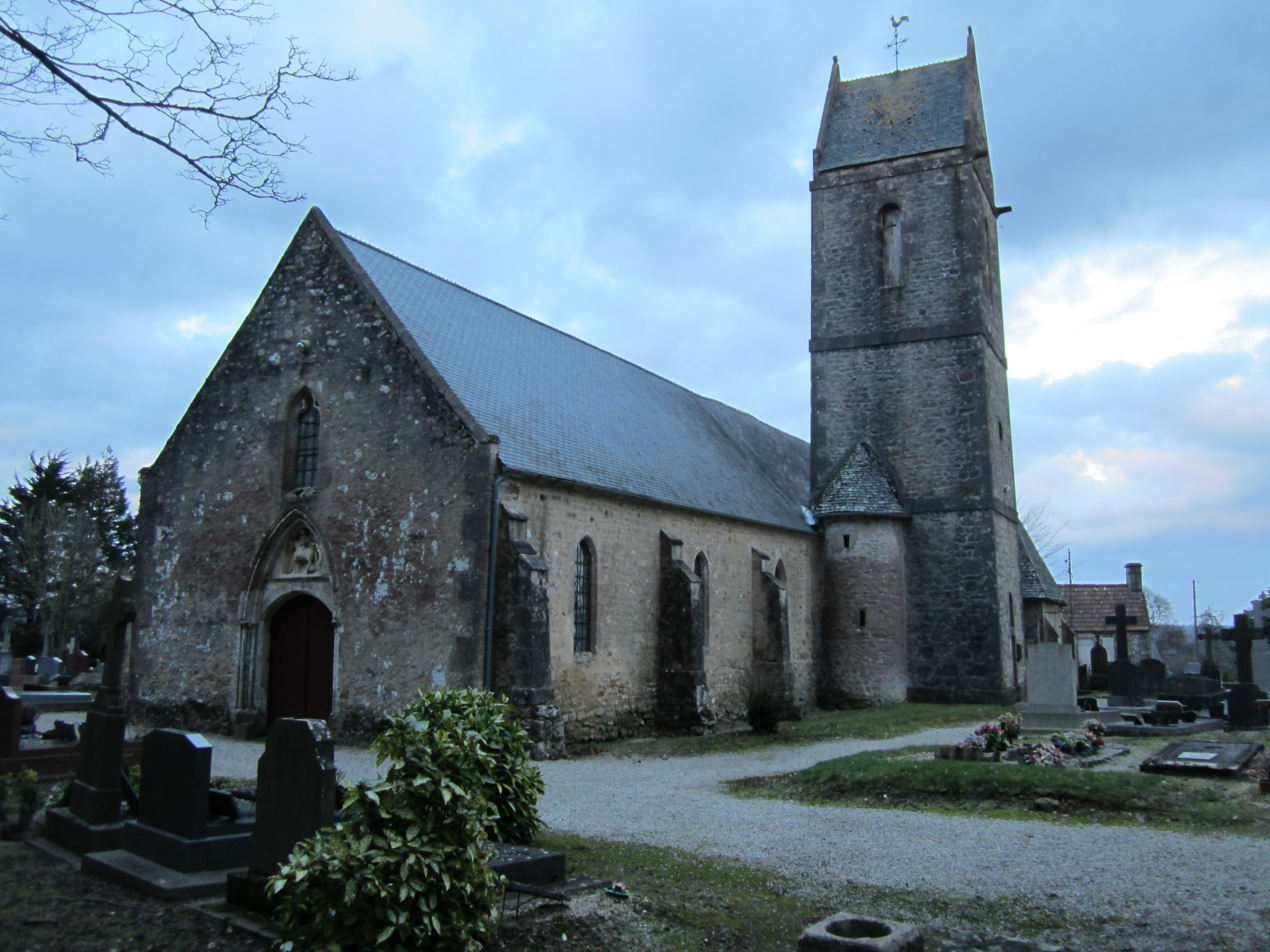
- The church of Saint-Martin de Montaigu-la-Brisette
- Location of Montaigu-la-Brisette
- Location within France Location within Normandy
- Coordinates: 49°33′57″N 1°25′06″W
- Country: France
- Region: Normandy
- Department: Manche
- Arrondissement: Cherbourg
- Canton: Valognes
- Intercommunality: CA Cotentin

Government
  - Mayor (2020–2026): Dominique Godan
- Area^{1}: 14.71 km^{2} (5.68 sq mi)
- Highest elevation: 131 m (430 ft)
- Lowest elevation: 37 m (121 ft)
- Population (2023): 495
  - Density: 33.7/km^{2} (87.2/sq mi)
- Demonym: Montaiguais
- Time zone: UTC+01:00 (CET)
  - Summer (DST): UTC+02:00 (CEST)
- INSEE/Postal code: 50335 /50700
- ^{1} French Land Register data, which excludes lakes, ponds, glaciers > 1 km^{2} (0.386 sq mi or 247 acres) and river estuaries.

Montaigu-la-Brisette (French pronunciation: [mɔ̃tɛɡy la bʁizɛt]) is a commune in the Manche department in Normandy in north-western France.

== Points of interest ==
- Parc animalier Montaigu la Brisette is a zoo covering 15 hectares that was established in 1983. The zoo has around 400 animals.
- Ancient settlement of Montaigu-la-Brisette is the site of a Gallo-Roman secondary settlement of the 1st to 3rd centuries AD, which was investigated by surveys, test pits and excavations between 1999 and 2011.

=== National heritage sites ===
- Église Saint-Martin is a thirteenth century church that along with its grounds was classed as a Monument historique in 1970.

== See also ==
- Communes of the Manche department
