= Parc animalier Montaigu la Brisette =

- Interactive map of Parc animalier Montaigu la Brisette
- 49°35′3.516″N 1°26′40.236″W
- Date opened: 1983
- Location: Montaigu-la-Brisette, France
- Land area: 15 hectares
- No. of animals: 400
- No. of species: 45
- Annual visitors: 45,000
- Owner: Nicolas Descoursières
- Website: zoomontaigu.fr

Parc animalier Montaigu la Brisette is a zoological park in the commune of Montaigu-la-Brisette.

The park covers an area of 15 hectares (37 acres). It is home to about 400 animals, and features around 45 species.

The Park is open from February to the start of November. It receives approximately 45,000 visitors per year.

== History ==
The Park was opened in 1983 by Nicolas Descoursières.
