= Rouelle =

The word rouelle can refer to:

== Things ==
- A yellow badge that Jews were forced to wear as an identifying mark when living under hostile regimes, especially in Nazi Germany
- Pont Rouelle, a bridge in Paris

== People ==
- Guillaume-François Rouelle, French chemist who proposed the concept of a base
- Hilaire Rouelle, younger brother of above, French chemist who discovered urea

== Places ==
- Rouelles, a French commune in the Haute-Marne département of the Champagne-Ardenne region
