= Gonneville, Manche =

Gonneville
- Part of Gonneville-le-Theil
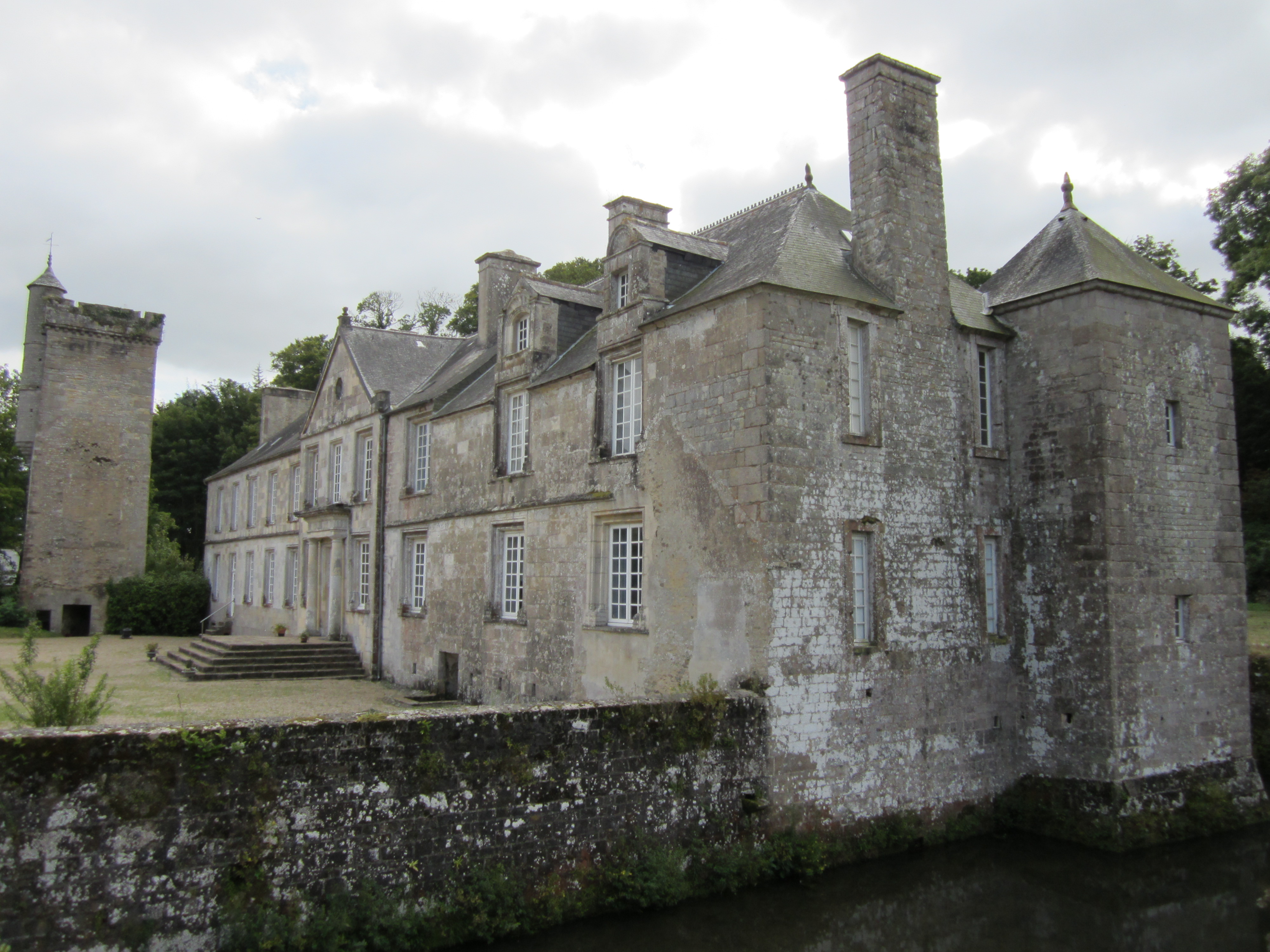
- The castle
- Location of Gonneville
- Location within France Location within Normandy
- Coordinates: 49°38′21″N 1°27′51″W
- Country: France
- Region: Normandy
- Department: Manche
- Arrondissement: Cherbourg
- Canton: Val-de-Saire
- Commune: Gonneville-le-Theil
- Area^{1}: 15.36 km^{2} (5.93 sq mi)
- Elevation: 108 m (354 ft)
- Highest elevation: 156 m (512 ft)
- Lowest elevation: 52 m (171 ft)
- Population (2018): 879
  - Density: 57.2/km^{2} (148/sq mi)
- Time zone: UTC+01:00 (CET)
  - Summer (DST): UTC+02:00 (CEST)
- Postal code: 50330
- ^{1} French Land Register data, which excludes lakes, ponds, glaciers > 1 km^{2} (0.386 sq mi or 247 acres) and river estuaries.

Gonneville (French pronunciation: [ɡɔnvil]) is a former commune in the Manche department in north-western France. On 1 January 2016, it was merged into the new commune of Gonneville-le-Theil.

== Climate ==
Climate data for Gonneville, Manche (1981–2010 averages)
Month	Jan	Feb	Mar	Apr	May	Jun	Jul	Aug	Sep	Oct	Nov	Dec	Year
Record high °C (°F)	14.9 (58.8)	18.7 (65.7)	20.9 (69.6)	23.9 (75.0)	28.6 (83.5)	30.7 (87.3)	33.7 (92.7)	33.2 (91.8)	29.3 (84.7)	27.0 (80.6)	20.8 (69.4)	15.9 (60.6)	33.7 (92.7)
Mean daily maximum °C (°F)	7.8 (46.0)	7.8 (46.0)	9.9 (49.8)	11.8 (53.2)	14.9 (58.8)	17.7 (63.9)	19.8 (67.6)	19.9 (67.8)	18.0 (64.4)	14.8 (58.6)	11.0 (51.8)	8.5 (47.3)	13.5 (56.3)
Mean daily minimum °C (°F)	3.5 (38.3)	3.2 (37.8)	4.6 (40.3)	5.7 (42.3)	8.5 (47.3)	10.9 (51.6)	13.0 (55.4)	13.3 (55.9)	11.8 (53.2)	9.4 (48.9)	6.4 (43.5)	4.2 (39.6)	7.9 (46.2)
Record low °C (°F)	−12.3 (9.9)	−9.9 (14.2)	−4.6 (23.7)	−3.1 (26.4)	0.1 (32.2)	2.9 (37.2)	6.0 (42.8)	6.3 (43.3)	3.5 (38.3)	−0.6 (30.9)	−4.0 (24.8)	−8.8 (16.2)	−12.3 (9.9)
Average precipitation mm (inches)	100.8 (3.97)	69.6 (2.74)	69.8 (2.75)	61.8 (2.43)	58.1 (2.29)	49.1 (1.93)	46.4 (1.83)	51.4 (2.02)	74.4 (2.93)	111.6 (4.39)	113.1 (4.45)	113.6 (4.47)	919.7 (36.21)
Average precipitation days	14.5	11.4	11.6	10.1	9.4	7.9	7.9	8.2	10.1	14.7	15.9	15.1	136.8
Source: Météo France

== See also ==
- Communes of the Manche department
