= Carte archéologique de la Gaule =

The Carte archéologique de la Gaule (CAG) is a series of books surveying French archaeology launched in 1931 and relaunched in 1988. The series lists all the archaeological discoveries of France from the Iron Age to the beginning of the Middle Ages (that is, from 800 BC to 800 AD). Each volume deals with one department of France. The survey is conducted under the aegis of the Académie des Inscriptions et Belles-Lettres.

== Volumes ==
- CAG 01 – Ain, by A. Buisson, 2017, 400 p., 290 fig. ISBN 2-87754-363-3 (reworked from 1990, 192 p., 79 fig., ISBN 2-87754-010-3.
- CAG 02 – Aisne, by Blaise Pichon, 2002, 598 p., 698 fig., ISBN 2-87754-081-2.
- CAG 03 – Allier, by J. Corrocher, M. Piboule, M. Hilaire, 1989, 216 p., 65 fig., ISBN 2-87754-009-X.
- CAG 04 – Alpes-de-Haute-Provence, G. Bérard, M. Provost, 2019 (544 p., 517 ill., ISBN 2-87754-390-0 (reworked from M. Provost de G. Bérard, 1997, 567 p., 496 fig., ISBN 2-87754-054-5.
- CAG 05 – Hautes-Alpes, by Fl. Mocci, 2022, 384 p, ISBN 978-2-87754-691-1 (reworked from I. Ganet, 1995, 188 p., 107 fig., ISBN 2-87754-036-7.
- CAG 06 – Alpes-Maritimes, by L. Lautier, M.-P. Rothé, 2010, 832 p., 990, fig. ISBN 2-87754-252-1.
- CAG 07 – Ardèche, by J. Dupraz, Ch. Fraysse, 2001, 496 p., 597 fig., ISBN 2-87754-069-3.
- CAG 08 – Ardennes, by D. Nicolas (R. and M. Chossenot, B. Lambot), 2011, 512 p., 696 fig., ISBN 2-87754-275-0.
- CAG 09 – Ariège, by J.-M. Escudé-Quillet, C. Maissant, 1996, 211 p., 173 fig., ISBN 2-87754-050-2.
- CAG 10 – Aube, by L. Denajar, 2005, 704 p, 528 ill., 920 fig, pl; ISBN 2-87754-093-6.
- CAG 11/1 – Narbonne, by E. Dellong, 2002, 700 p., 1044 ill. ISBN 2-87754-079-0.
- CAG 11/2 – Aude, by P. Ournac, M. Passelac, G. Rancoule, 2009, 572 p., 469 ill., ISBN 2-87754-233-5
- CAG 12 – Aveyron, by Ph. Gruat, G. Malige, M. Vidal, l’ASPAA, 2011, 695 p., 658 fig., ISBN 2-87754-273-4.
- CAG 13/1 – Etang de Berre, by F. Gateau, 1996, 380 p., 246 fig., ISBN 2-87754-041-3.
- CAG 13/2 – Les Alpilles and la Montagnette, by F. Gateau, O. Colas, M. Provost, 1999, 464 p., 407 fig., ISBN 2-87754-059-6.
- CAG 13/3 – Marseille and ses alentours, by M.-P. Rothé, H. Tréziny, 2005, 925 p., 1301 fig., ISBN 2-87754-095-2.
- CAG 13/4 – Aix-en-Provence, Pays d’Aix, Val de Durance, dirigé par Fl. Mocci, N. Nin, 2006, 781 p., 1000 ill. ISBN 2-87754-098-7.
- CAG 13/5 – Arles, Crau, Camargue, by M.-P. Rothé, M. Heijmans, 2008, 906 p., 1331 ill., ISBN 2-87754-204-1.
- CAG 14 – Calvados, by F. Delacampagne, 1990, 166 p., 90 fig., ISBN 2-87754-011-1.
- CAG 15 – Cantal, M. Provost, P. Vallat, 1996, 217 p., 174 fig., ISBN 2-87754-043-X.
- CAG 16 – Charente, by Chr. Vernou, 1993, 254 p., 138 fig.ISBN 2-87754-026-X.
- CAG 17/1 – Charente-Maritime, by L. Maurin, 1999, 363 p., 332 fig., ISBN 2-87754-061-8.
- CAG 17/2 – Saintes, by L. Maurin, 2007, 439 p., 502 fig. ISBN 978-2-87754-190-9.
- CAG 18 – Cher, by J.-Fr. Chevrot, J. Troadec, 1992, 370 p., 250 fig., 15 pl. ISBN 2-87754-016-2.
- CAG 19 – Corrèze, by G. Lintz, 1992, 224 p., 96 fig., ISBN 2-87754-017-0.
- CAG 2A-2B – Corse, by Fr. Michel, D. Pasqualaggi, 2013, 315 p., 525 ill., ISBN 9782877543156.
- CAG 21/1 – Côte d’Or, Alésia, M. Provost, 2009, 558 p., 640 fig., ISBN 978-2-87754-227-2
- CAG 21/2 – Côte d’Or, d’Allerey à Normier, M. Provost and alii, 2009, 651 p., 763 fig., ISBN 2-87754-228-9.
- CAG 21/3 – Côte d’Or, de Nuits-Saint-Georges à Voulaines, M. Provost and alii, 2009, 464 p., 554 fig., pl., ISBN 978-2-87754-229-6.
- CAG 22 – Côtes d'Armor, by C. Bizien, P. Galliou, H. Kerébel, 2003, 406 p., 332 fig, atlas, ISBN 2-87754-080-4.
- CAG 23 – Creuse, by D. Dussot, 1989, 205 p., ISBN 2-87754-005-7.
- CAG 24 – Dordogne, by H. Gaillard, 1997, 299 p., 169 fig., ISBN 2-87754-051-0.
- CAG 24/2 – Périgueux, by Cl. Girardy (and E. Saliège, H. Gaillard), 2013, 310 p., 397 fig, plan, ISBN 9782877543019.
- CAG 25 and 90 – Doubs and Belfort, by L. Joan, 2003, 561 p., 576 fig., ISBN 2-87754-082-0.
- CAG 26 – Drôme, by J. Planchon, M. Bois, P. Conjard-Réthoré, 2010, 73 p, 1073 ill., ISBN 978-2-87754-246-3.
- CAG 27 – Eure, M. Provost and Archéo 27, 2019, 832 p., 1296 ill., ISBN 978-2-87754-018-6 (reworked from M. Provost dir. by D. Cliquet, 1993, 285 p., 128 pl., ISBN 2-87754-018-9).
- CAG 28 – Eure-et-Loir, by A. Ollagnier, D. Joly, 1994, 370 p., 435 ill., ISBN 2-87754-032-4.
- CAG 29 – Finistère, by P. Galliou, 2010, 495 p., 476 ill., ISBN 2-87754-251-3, (reworked from P. Galliou, 1989, 227 p., 78 ill.)
- CAG 30/1 – Nîmes, by J.-L. Fiches, A. Veyrac, 1996, 633 p., 388 fig., 32 pl., ISBN 2-87754-047-2.
- CAG 30/2 – Gard, M. Provost, 1999, 399 p., 427 ill., ISBN 2-87754-065-0.
- CAG 30/3 – Gard, M. Provost, 1999, 466 p., 512 fig., ISBN 2-87754-066-9.
- CAG 31/1 – Haute-Garonne by J. Massendari, 2006, 399 p., 215 ill., ISBN 2-87754-188-6.
- CAG 31/2 – Le Comminges by R. Sablayrolles, A. Beyrie, 2006, 515 p., 620 ill., ISBN 2-87754-101-0.
- CAG 31/3 – Toulouse, M. Provost, J.-M. Pailler, 2017, 406 p., 410 ill., ISBN 2-87754-356-0.
- CAG 32 – Gers, by J. Lapart, C. Petit, 1993, 354 p., 138 fig., 2 pl., ISBN 2-87754-019-7.
- CAG 33/1 – Gironde, by H. Sion, 1994, 360 p., 223 fig., ISBN 2-87754-028-6.
- CAG 33/2 – Bordeaux, by C. Doulan, X. Charpentier, 2013, 387 p., 456 ill., ISBN 9782877543026.
- CAG 34/1 – Lodévois, by L. Schneider, D. Garcia, 1998, 332 p., 257 fig. ISBN 2-87754-057-X.
- CAG 34/2 – Agde and l'Etang de Thau, by M. Lugand, I. Bermond, 2001, 448 p., 619 fig., ISBN 978-2-87754-071-1.
- CAG 34/3 – Montpelliérais, by J. Vial, 2003, 480 p., 411 ill., ISBN 2-87754-083-9.
- CAG 34/4 – Béziers, by D. Ugolini, Chr. Olive, and E. Gomez, 2012, 405 p., 555 ill, atlas, ISBN 9782877542852.
- CAG 34/5 – Le Biterrois, by D. Ugolini, Chr. Olive, 2013, 635 p., 952 ill., ISBN 2-87754-314-5.
- CAG 35 – Ille-et-Vilaine, by G. Leroux, A. Provost, 1990, 304 p., 556 fig., ISBN 2-87754-013-8.
- CAG 36 – Indre, M. Provost, G. Coulon, J. Holmgren, 1992, 240 p., 194 fig., ISBN 2-87754-014-6.
- CAG 37 – Indre-et-Loire, M. Provost, 1988, 141 p., 41 fig., ISBN 2-87754-002-2.
- CAG 37/2 – Tours, Anne-Marie Jouquand, Élisabeth Lorans, Jacques Seigne, 2024, 160 p. ISBN 978-2-87754-703-1.
- CAG 38/1 – Isère, by A. Pelletier, 1994, 192 p., 128 fig., ISBN 2-87754-034-0.
- CAG 38/2 – Isère, Tour-du-Pin, 2011, by Fr. Bertrandy, St. Bleu, J.-P. Jospin, R. Royet, 387 p., 352 ill., ISBN 2-87754-264-5.
- CAG 38/3 – Vienne, F. Adjadj, R. Lauxerois (and B. Helly), 2013, 555 p, 561 p., ISBN 2-87754-316-1.
- CAG 38/4 – Isère, Grenoble, by François Bertrandy, Jean-Pascal Jospin, Denis Gonin, Jean-Pierre Moyne, Guillaume Varennes, 2017, 397 pages, 355 fig., ISBN 978-2-87754-355-2.
- CAG 39 – Jura, by M.-P. Rothé, 2001, 840 p., 554 fig., ISBN 2-87754-072-3.
- CAG 40 – Landes, by B. Boyrie-Fénié, 1994, 192 p., 114 fig. ISBN 2-87754-033-2.
- CAG 41 – Loir-et-Cher, M. Provost, 1988, 159 p., 33 fig., ISBN 2-87754-003-0.
- CAG 42 – Loire, by M.-O. Lavendhomme, 1997, 305 p., 172 fig., ISBN 2-87754-053-7.
- CAG 43 – Haute-Loire, M. Provost, B. Rémy, M.-Chr. Pin-Carré, 1994, 192 p., 54 fig., ISBN 2-87754-029-4.
- CAG 44 – Loire-Atlantique, M. Provost, 1988, 177 p., 33 fig., ISBN 2-87754-001-4.
- CAG 45 – Loiret, M. Provost, 1988, 249 p., ISBN 2-87754-004-9.
- CAG 46 – Lot, by A. Filippini (and J.-P. Girault, J.-M. Paillet, D. Rigal), 2010, 263 p., 197 ill., ISBN 978-2-87754-253-1 (reworked from M. Labrousse, G. Mercadier, 1990, 155 p, 65 ill., ISBN 978-2-87754-012-4).
- CAG 47 – Lot-et-Garonne, by B. Fages, 1995, 365 p., 230 fig., ISBN 2-87754-037-5.
- CAG 48 – Lozère, by A. Trintignac, 2012, 531 p., 628 ill., ISBN 2-87754-277-7 (reworked from D. Fabrié, 1989, 144 p., 70 fig., ISBN 2-87754-007-3).
- CAG 49 – Maine-et-Loire, M. Provost, 1988, 174 p., 26 fig., ISBN 2-87754-000-6.
- CAG 50 – Manche, by J. Pilet-Lemière, D. Levalet, 1989, 136 p., 60 fig., ISBN 2-87754-008-1.
- CAG 51/1 – Marne, by R. Chossenot, 2004, 848 p., 710 ill. ISBN 2-87754-090-1.
- CAG 51/2 – Reims, by R. Chossenot, A. Estéban, R. Neiss, 2010, 480 p., 775, plan, ISBN 2-87754-243-2.
- CAG 52/1 – Haute-Marne, by J.-J. Thévenard, 1996, 372 p., 300 fig. ISBN 2-87754-049-9.
- CAG 52/2 – Langres, by M. Joly, 2001, 188 p., 189 fig., ISBN 2-87754-049-9.
- CAG 53 – Mayenne, by J. Naveau, 1992, 176 p., 339 fig., ISBN 2-87754-015-4.
- CAG 54 – Meurthe-et-Moselle, by G. Hamm, 2004, 468 p., 400 ill. ISBN 2-87754-091-X.
- CAG 55 – Meuse, by F. Mourot, 2001, 655 p., 503 fig., ISBN 2-87754-074-X
- CAG 56 – Morbihan, by P. Galliou, 2009, 445 p., 436 ill., ISBN 978-2-87754-238-8.
- CAG 57/1 – Moselle, by P. Flotté, M. Fuchs, 2004, 896 p., 516 ill., ISBN 2-87754-087-1.
- CAG 57/2 – Metz : P. Flotté, 2005, 368 p., 314 fig. ISBN 2-87754-094-4.
- CAG 58 – Nièvre, by H. Bigeard, A. Bouthier, 1996, 300 p., 218 fig. ISBN 2-87754-045-6.
- CAG 59 – Nord, by R. Delmaire, 1996, 492 p., 175 fig., ISBN 2-87754-048-0.
- CAG 59/2 – Nord, Bavai, by R. Delmaire, 2011, 392 p., 129 fig., ISBN 978-2-87754-274-6.
- CAG 60 – Oise, by G.-P. Woimant, 1995, 570 p., 416 ill., ISBN 2-87754-039-1.
- CAG 61 – L'Orne, by Ph. Bernouis, 1999, 249 p., 180 fig., ISBN 2-87754-060-X.
- CAG 62/1 – Pas-de-Calais, by R. Delmaire, 1994, ISBN 2-87754-021-9.
- CAG 62/2 – Pas-de-Calais, by R. Delmaire, 1994, 603 p.ISBN 2-87754-023-5.
- CAG 63/1 – Clermont-Ferrand, M. Provost, Chr. Jouannet, 1994, 290 p., 117 fig., ISBN 2-87754-030-8.
- CAG 63/2 – Puy-de-Dôme, M. Provost, Chr. Jouannet, 1994, 374 p., 158 fig., ISBN 2-87754-031-6.
- CAG 64 – Pyrénées-Atlantiques, by G. Fabre, by A. Lussault, 1994, 232 p., 104 fig., ISBN 2-87754-027-8.
- CAG 65 – Hautes-Pyrénées, by A. Lussault, 1997, 304 p., 227 fig., ISBN 2-87754-052-9.
- CAG 66 – Pyrénées-Orientales, by J. Ktarba, G. Castellvi, Fl. Mazière, 2007, 712 p., 745 ill, 8 cartes, ISBN 978-2-87754-200-5.
- CAG 67/1 – Bas-Rhin, by P. Flotté, M. Fuchs, 2000, 735 p., 587 ill., ISBN 2-87754-067-7.
- CAG 67/2 – Strasbourg, by J. Baudoux, P. Flotté, M. Fuchs, M.-D. Waton, 2002, 586 p., 588 ill., ISBN 2-87754-067-7.
- CAG 68 – Haut-Rhin, by M. Zehner, 1998, 375 p., 234 fig. ISBN 2-87754-058-8.
- CAG 69/1 – Le Rhône : O. Faure-Brac, 2006, 484 p., 528 fig. ISBN 2-87754-096-0.
- CAG 69/2 – Lyon : A.-C. Le Mer, Cl. Chomer, 2007, 883 p., 887 fig. ISBN 2-87754-099-5.
- CAG 70 – Haute-Saône, by O. Faure-Brac, 2002, 484 p., 528 fig., ISBN 2-87754-077-4.
- CAG 71/1 – Autun, by A. Rebourg, 1993, 238 p., 165 fig., ISBN 2-87754-025-1.
- CAG 71/2 – Autun, by le CEAA, Architecture and Archéologie, 1993, 81 p., 12 pl., ISBN 2-87754-022-7.
- CAG 71/3 – Saône-et-Loire, by A. Rebourg, 1994, ISBN 2-87754-024-3.
- CAG 71/4 – Saône-et-Loire, by A. Rebourg, 1994, 2 vol., 552 p., fig., ISBN 2-87754-040-5.
- CAG 72 – Sarthe, by J.-Ph. Bouvand and St. Deschamps, 2001, 519 p., 480 fig. ISBN 2-87754-073-1.
- CAG 73 – Savoie, by B. Rémy, Fr. Ballet, E. Ferber, 1996, 247 p., 141 fig. ISBN 2-87754-046-4.
- CAG 74 – Haute-Savoie, by Fr. Bertrandy, M. Chevrier, J. Serralongue, 1999, 412 p., 384 fig., ISBN 2-87754-062-6.
- CAG 75 – Paris, by D. Busson, 1998, 609 p., 398 fig., ISBN 2-87754-056-1.
- CAG 76/1 – Seine-Maritime, by I. Rogeret, 1998, 662 p., 556 fig., ISBN 2-87754-055-3.
- CAG 76/2 – Rouen, by M.-Cl. Lequoy, B. Guillot, 2004, 320 p, 322 ill. ISBN 2-87754-089-8.
- CAG 77/1 – Seine-et-Marne, by J.-N. Griffisch, D. Magnan, D. Mordant, 2008, 707 p., 768 ill, ISBN 978-2-87754-210-4.
- CAG 77/2 – Seine-et-Marne, by J.-N. Griffisch, D. Magnan, D. Mordant, 2008, 707 p. (p. 713-1287); 1321 ill., ISBN 978-2-87754-211-1.
- CAG 78 – Yvelines, by Y. Barat, 2007, 429 p., 604 ill.. ISBN 978-2-87754-189-3.
- CAG 79 – Deux-Sèvres, by J. Hiernard, D. Simon-Hiernard, 1996, 400 p., 269 p., ISBN 2-87754-044-8.
- CAG 80/1 – Amiens, by Bl. Pichon, 2009, 286 p., 414 ill. ISBN 2-87754-231-9
- CAG 80/2 – Somme, by T. Ben Redjeb, 2013, 840 p., 1268 ill., ISBN 978-2-87754-294-4
- CAG 81 – Tarn, by the Comité Départemental du Tarn, 1995, 298 p., 173 fig. ISBN 2-87754-038-3.
- CAG 82 – Tarn-et-Garonne, by H. Mavéraud-Tardiveau, 2007, 226 p., 234 ill., ISBN 2-87754-196-7
- CAG 83/1 – Var, by J.-P. Brun, 1999, 488 p., 530 fig., ISBN 2-87754-063-4.
- CAG 83/2 – Var, by J.-P. Brun, 1999, 496 p., 597 fig., ISBN 2-87754-064-2.
- CAG 83/3 – Fréjus, by Ch. Gébara (and P. Digelmann, Y. Lemoine), 2012, 513 p., 754 ill, carte, ISBN 978-2-87754-287-6.
- CAG 84/1 - Vaison-la-Romaine, M. Provost, J.-Cl. Meffre, 2003, 553 p., 789 ill, atlas, ISBN 2-87754-084-7.
- CAG 84/2 – Luberon and Pays d’Apt, by L. Tallah, 2004, 420 p., 450 ill., ISBN 2-87754-085-5.
- CAG 84/3 – Orange and sa région, by A. Roumégous, 2009, 371 p., 306 ill., ISBN 978-2-87754-232-6.
- CAG 84/4 – Avignon, Carpentras, Cavaillon, 2013 (2015), 473 p., 375 ill., ISBN 978-2-87754-334-7.
- CAG 85 – Vendée, M. Provost and J. Hiernard, 1996, 246 p., 173 fig., ISBN 2-87754-042-1.
- CAG 86/1 – Vienne, M. Provost, 2021, 490 p., 480 ill., ISBN 978-2-87754-675-1
- CAG 86/2 – Vienne, M. Provost, 2021, p. 491-927, iII. 481-1097, ISBN 978-2-87754-676-8.
- CAG 86/3 – Poitiers, M. Provost, 2022, 439 p., 360 ill. by SIG, ISBN 978-2-87754-686-7.
- CAG 87 – Haute-Vienne, by J. Perrier, 1993, 224 p., 129 pl., ISBN 2-87754-020-0.
- CAG 88 – Vosges, by M. Michtler, 2004, 425 p., 453 ill., ISBN 2-87754-088-X.
- CAG 88/2 – Grand, M. Provost, mai 2022, 126 p., 125 ill., ISBN 2-87754-687-X.
- CAG 89/1 – Yonne, by J.-P. Delor, 2002, 480 p., 665 fig., ISBN 2-87754-075-8.
- CAG 89/2 – Yonne, by J.-P. Delor, 2002, p., 481 to 884, fig. 666 to 1282; ISBN 2-87754-076-6.
- CAG 90 – see above, CAG 25
- CAG 91 – Essonne, by F. Naudet, July 2004, 320 p., 157 fig., ISBN 2-87754-086-3.
- CAG 92 – Hauts-de-Seine : Fr. Abert, 2005 91 p., 53 fig. ISBN 2-87754-092-8.
- CAG 93 – Seine-Saint-Denis, by Cl. Héron dir., 2018, 381 p., 549 ill, ISBN 2-87754-366-8.
- CAG 94 – Val-de-Marne, by F. Naudet, L.D.A., 2001, 168 p., 137 fig. ISBN 2-87754-070-7.
- CAG 95 – Val d’Oise : M. Wabon, Fr. Abert, D. Vermeersch, 2006, 495 pages, 497 ill. ISBN 2-87754-097-9.
