= Le Theil, Manche =

Le Theil
- Part of Gonneville-le-Theil
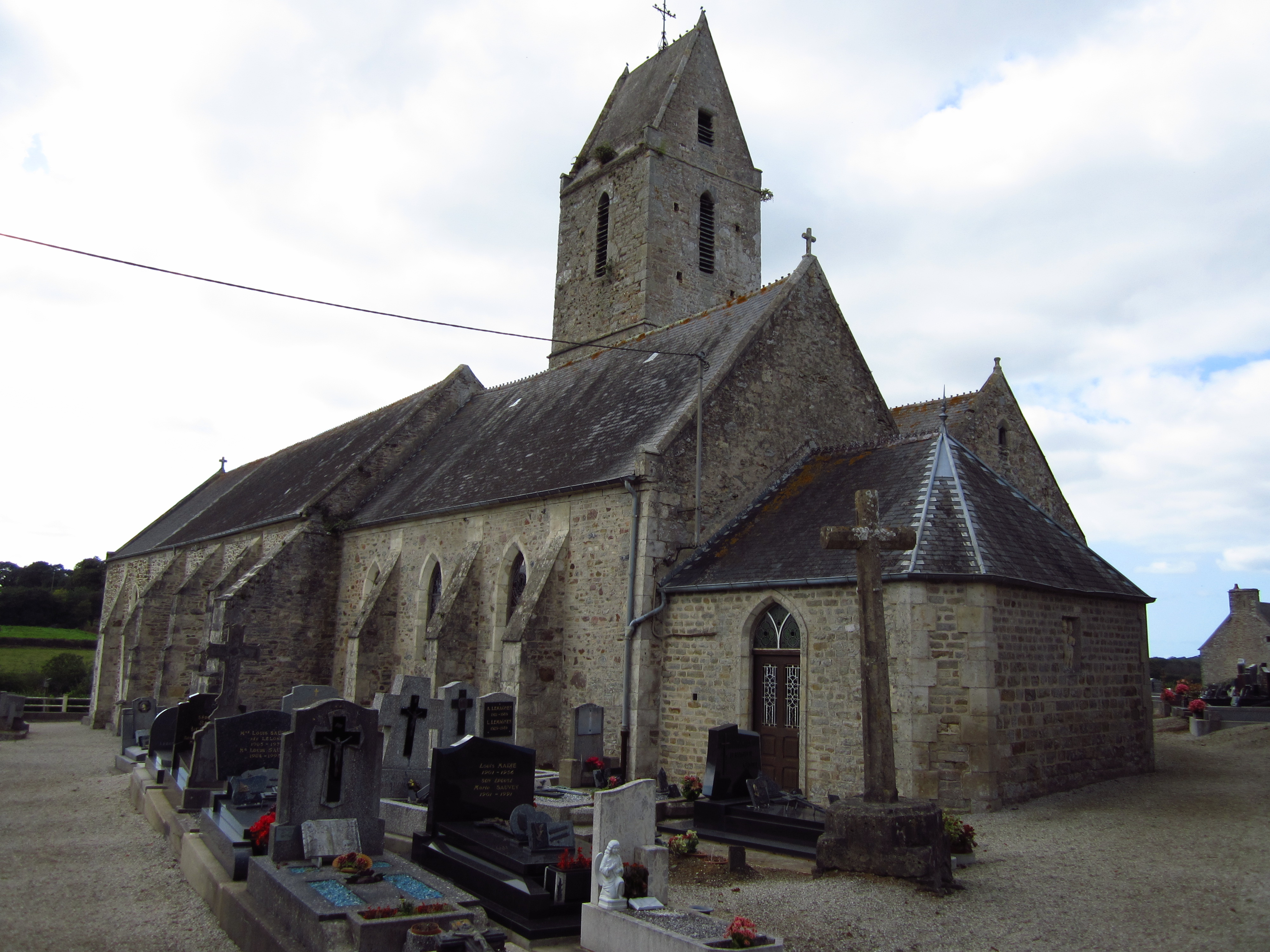
- The church of Sainte-Marguerite
- Location of Le Theil
- Location within France Location within Normandy
- Coordinates: 49°36′35″N 1°28′16″W
- Country: France
- Region: Normandy
- Department: Manche
- Arrondissement: Cherbourg
- Canton: Val-de-Saire
- Commune: Gonneville-le-Theil
- Area^{1}: 13.81 km^{2} (5.33 sq mi)
- Elevation: 120 m (390 ft)
- Highest elevation: 132 m (433 ft)
- Lowest elevation: 47 m (154 ft)
- Population (2018): 653
  - Density: 47.3/km^{2} (122/sq mi)
- Time zone: UTC+01:00 (CET)
  - Summer (DST): UTC+02:00 (CEST)
- Postal code: 50330
- ^{1} French Land Register data, which excludes lakes, ponds, glaciers > 1 km^{2} (0.386 sq mi or 247 acres) and river estuaries.

Le Theil is a former commune in the Manche department in Normandy in north-western France. On 1 January 2016, it was merged into the new commune of Gonneville-le-Theil.

== See also ==
- Communes of the Manche department
