= Corpus Agrimensorum Romanorum =

Roman book on land surveying

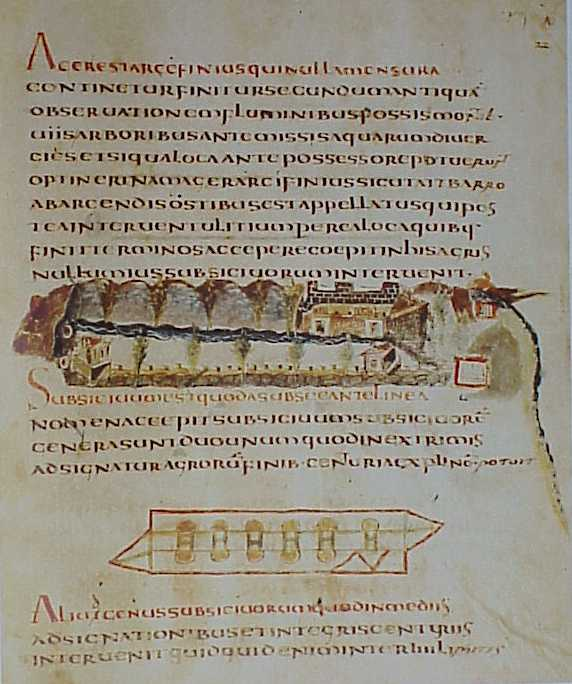
A page from the Codex Arcerianus. One illustration shows a perspective view of a house, and the other, the boundaries of the property.

The Corpus Agrimensorum Romanorum (Corpus of Roman Land Surveyors) is a Roman book on land surveying which collects works by Siculus Flaccus, Frontinus, Agennius Urbicus, Hyginus Gromaticus and other writers, known as the Gromatici or Agrimensores ("land surveyors"). The work is preserved in various manuscripts, of which the oldest is the 6th or 7th-century Codex Arcerianus.

== Contents and authors ==
The Corpus consists of a number of texts with different contents, composed at different dates. The Codex Arcerianus alone contains 33 separate works, most of which are the writings of the Agrimensores. These writings were clearly written as textbooks or manuals for working land surveyors. The most important authors in the collection are Frontinus (1st century AD), Agennius Urbicus (5th or 6th century), Hyginus Gromaticus, Siculus Flaccus (2nd century), Balbus and Marcus Junius Nipsus (2nd century).

Another important component of the work are the Libri Coloniarum ("Books of Colonies"), lists of surveyed areas of countryside and cities in Italy between Etruria and Sicily, mostly in southern Italy. Possibly, these were areas that were subject to land surveys, although they had already been occupied under the arcifinalis law (i.e. land survey and distribution at point of conquest). The process is much debated among historians.

A third sub-set of works in the corpus are writings which deal with the mathematical and geometric aspects of land surveying. The most important of these are the Expositio et ratio omnium formarum (Explanation and Calculation of All Shapes) by Balbus and a mathematical work by Epaphrodites and Vitruvius Rufus

Various other texts are also bundled into the Corpus, including:

- Extracts from Euclid's Elements
- Extracts from Columella's De re rustica
- The Lex Mamila Roscia Peducaea Alliena Fabia, part of a Roman law on setting and protecting land boundaries. In particular, the law imposes a fine of 5,000 sesterces for moving a boundary stone. The date of the law is debated, but it is likely that the law was proposed and passed by Gaius Mamilius Limetanus when he was tribune of the people in 109 BC.

== Transmission and legacy ==
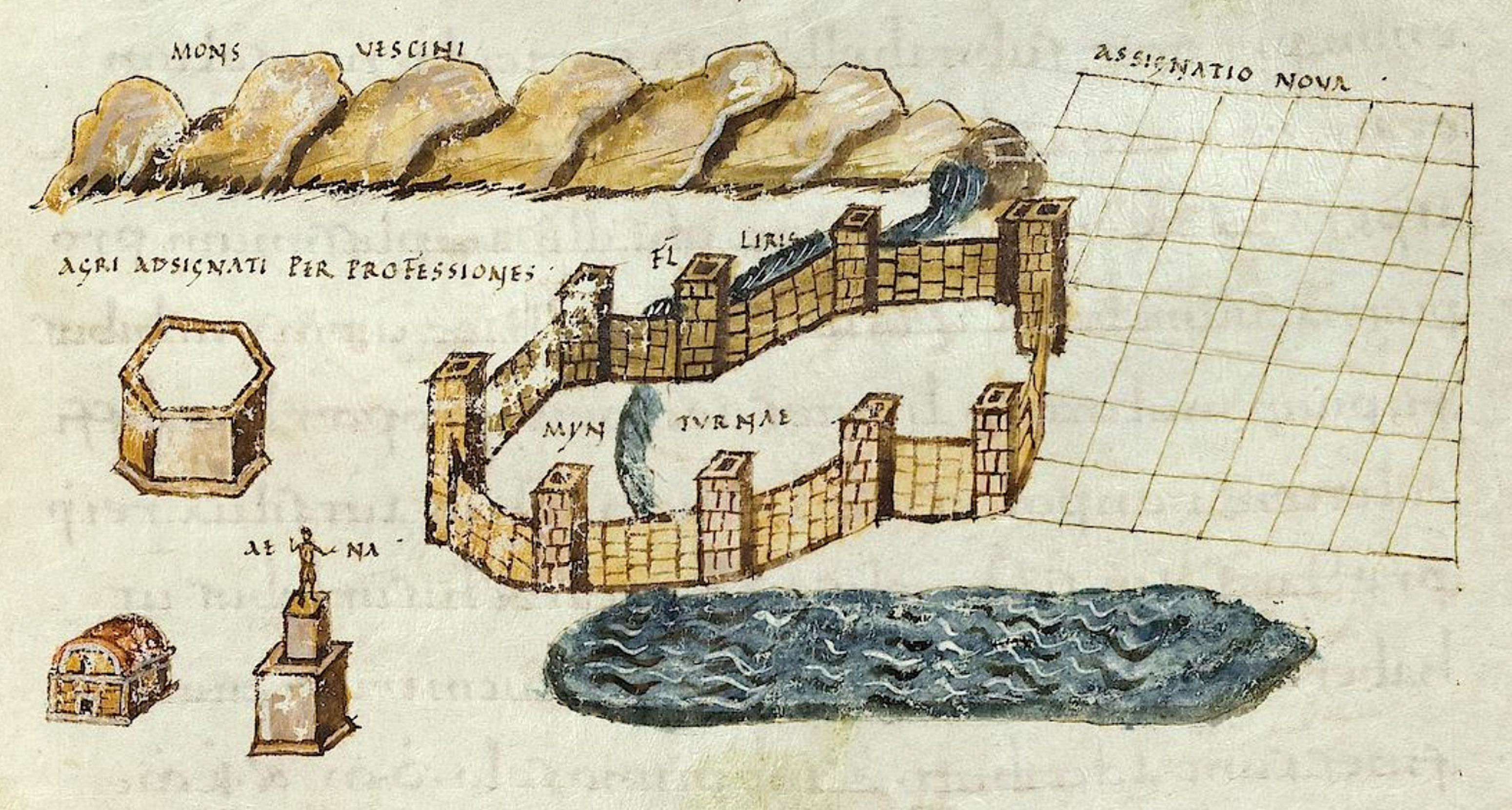
Minturnae, from the Carolingian manuscript Palatinus 1564

The Corpus is transmitted in several manuscripts. The oldest of these is the sixth- or seventh-century uncial manuscript known as the Codex Arcerianus or Codex Guelfferbytanus 36.23 Augusteus 2, now held in the Herzog August Bibliothek in Wolfenbüttel. This is one of the few surviving non-literary and non-religious illuminated manuscripts from late antiquity. Like all later manuscripts, this text contains gaps and corrupt sections; the beginning and ending of the manuscript are both missing. The various scripts and formats of the manuscript show that the work is a compilation. Different manuscripts have very different contents. For example, Siculus Flaccus' text is absent from the Codex Arcerianus and manuscripts derived from it, except for a short extract appearing within another text.

The Corpus, especially its mathematical portions, were also included in the encyclopaedic works of Late Antiquity. Its influence may extend to the Palace school of Charlemagne. The collection was still widely read in the Early Middle Ages.

== Printing and translation ==
Individual texts from the Corpus began to appear in printed editions from 1491. In 1554, Adrianus Turnebus published a printed edition of the majority of the Corpus, including the important Agrimensores, under the title De Agrorum Conditionibus et Constitutionibus Limitum (On the Creation of Fields and Delimitation of their Borders). Petrus Scriverius used the Codex Arcerianus as the basis of his edition in 1607.

The German ancient historian, Karl Lachmann edited significant portions of the collection, especially the writings of the Agrimensores Frontinues, Agennius Urbicus, Hyginus Gromaticus and Siculus Flaccus, as well as the Libri Coloniarum in 1848. The 1913 edition of Carl Olof Thulin contains only a few works. The 2000 edition of Brian Campbell is much broader and also contains an English translation.

== Editions ==
- Blume, Friedrich; Lachmann, Karl; Rudorff, Adolf August Friedrich, eds. (1848–1852). Gromatici veteres. Die Schriften der römischen Feldmesser. Berlin.
- Corpus Agrimensorum Romanorum (Cod. Guelf. 36.23 Aug. 2°, Codex Arcerianus): ein Agrimensorencodex, illustriertes Handbuch für den römischen Feldvermesser, 6. Jahrhundert, in der Herzog August Bibliothek. Fotomechnische Reproduktion mit einer Einleitung von Hans Butzmann, Leiden 1970, ISBN 90-218-9230-8.
- Carl Olof Thulin, ed., Corpus agrimensorum Romanorum (= Opuscula agrimensorum veterum. I). Leipzig 1913 (Nachdruck Stuttgart 1971), ISBN 3-519-01245-6.
- Campbell, Brian, ed. (2000). The writings of the Roman land surveyors. Introduction, translation and commentary. Journal of the Roman Studies Monographs. Vol. 9. London.
