= Hyginus =

Hyginus may refer to:

== People ==
- Hyginus, the author of the Fabulae, an important ancient Latin source for Greek mythology.
- Hyginus, the author of the Astronomia, a popular ancient Latin guide on astronomy. It is disputed whether this author was the same person as the author of the Fabulae.
- Gaius Julius Hyginus (c. 64 BC–17 AD), a learned freedman of Augustus, librarian of the Palatine library, and reputed author of the Fabulae and the Astronomia, although this is disputed.
- Hyginus Gromaticus (fl. 98–117), Roman surveyor
- Pope Hyginus (died 142), Greek saint and bishop of Rome
- Hyginus of Córdoba, 4th-century bishop and opponent of Priscillian

== Other uses ==
- Hyginus, a crater on the Moon

== See also ==
- Pseudo-Hyginus (disambiguation)
