= Barbarian Princess =

Barbarian Princess may refer to:

- Princess Kaiulani (film), sometimes titled Barbarian Princess, a 2009 film based on the life of Princess Kaʻiulani
- Barbarian Princess (novel), a 1982 novel by Damion Hunter
