= Pseudo-Hyginus =

Pseudo-Hyginus ("False Hyginus") may refer to:

- The author of the work De Astronomica credited to G. Julius Hyginus
- The author of the work De Munitionibus Castrorum credited to Hyginus Gromaticus
- The author of the work Fabulae credited to Hyginus
