= Frontinus =

Roman civil engineer, author, soldier and senator (c. 40–103 AD)

Sextus Julius Frontinus
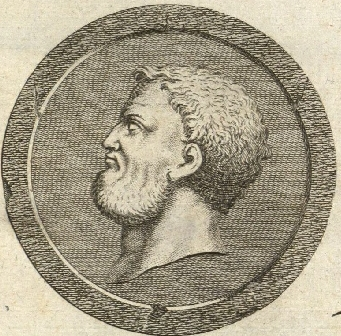
- Medallion portrait of Frontinus on the title page of the Bipontine edition of his works.

Roman consul
- In office c. 98 AD – c. 98 AD
- Preceded by: Gnaeus Domitius Curvius Tullus II
- Succeeded by: Lucius Julius Ursus II
- In office c. 100 AD – c. 100 AD
- Preceded by: Tiberius Julius Ferox
- Succeeded by: Gaius Cilnius Proculus

Governor of Roman Britain
- In office c. 74 AD – c. 78 AD
- Preceded by: Quintus Petillius Cerialis
- Succeeded by: Gnaeus Julius Agricola

Personal details
- Born: c. 40 AD Gallia Narbonensis, Roman Empire
- Died: c. 103 AD
- Children: 1+
- Occupation: Engineer, author, soldier & politician

Sextus Julius Frontinus (c. 40 – 103 AD) was a Roman civil engineer, author, soldier and senator of the late 1st century AD. He was a successful general under Domitian, commanding forces in Roman Britain, and on the Rhine and Danube frontiers. A novus homo, he was consul three times. Frontinus ably discharged several important administrative duties for Nerva and Trajan. However, he is best known to the post-Classical world as an author of technical treatises, especially De aquaeductu, dealing with the aqueducts of Rome.

== Family ==
Due to a lack of either a titulus honorarius or sepulcralis, there is no outline of Frontinus' life, the names of his parents, or of his wife. Some details can be inferred from chance mentions: He is thought to be of Narbonese origins, and originally of the equestrian class. From the nomenclature of the name of Publius Calvisius Ruso Julius Frontinus (consul c. 84), it is likely Frontinus had a sister, who was the other's mother. Frontinus had at least one daughter, the wife of Quintus Sosius Senecio (cos. 99, II 107) and mother of Sosia Polla.

== Career ==
In AD 70, Frontinus participated in the suppression of the Rhineland revolt, and later recorded that he received the surrender of 70,000 Lingones. Between that date and being appointed governor of Britain to succeed Quintus Petillius Cerialis a few years later, Frontinus was appointed suffect consul. While governor of Britain, he subjugated the Silures of South Wales and is thought to have likewise campaigned against the Brigantes. He was succeeded by Gnaeus Julius Agricola, the father-in-law of the famous historian Tacitus, in 77. Birley believes it "is fair to speculate" that Frontinus was with Domitian during the German campaign of 83. An inscription at Hieropolis in Phrygia, as well as a number of coins of Smyrna, attests that he was proconsul of Asia in AD 86.

In 97, he was appointed curator aquarum (supervisor of the aqueducts) by the emperor Nerva, an office only conferred upon persons of very high standing. In this capacity, he followed another distinguished Roman statesman, Agrippa, the friend, ally and son-in-law of Augustus, who organised in 34 BC a campaign of public repairs and improvements, including renovation of the aqueduct Aqua Marcia and an extension of its pipes to cover more of the city.

The following year Frontinus held a second consulship as suffect in February, with Trajan as his colleague, and two years later he was made consul ordinarius with Trajan. Birley notes, "This exceptional honour underlines the high regard in which he [Frontinus] was held, and suggests, further, that Trajan had a debt to repay." He was also a member of the College of Augurs. He died in 103 or 104, a date based on Pliny the Younger writing to his friends that he was elected to the college of augurs to fill the vacancy Frontinus' death had created.

== Writings ==
=== Aqueducts of Rome ===
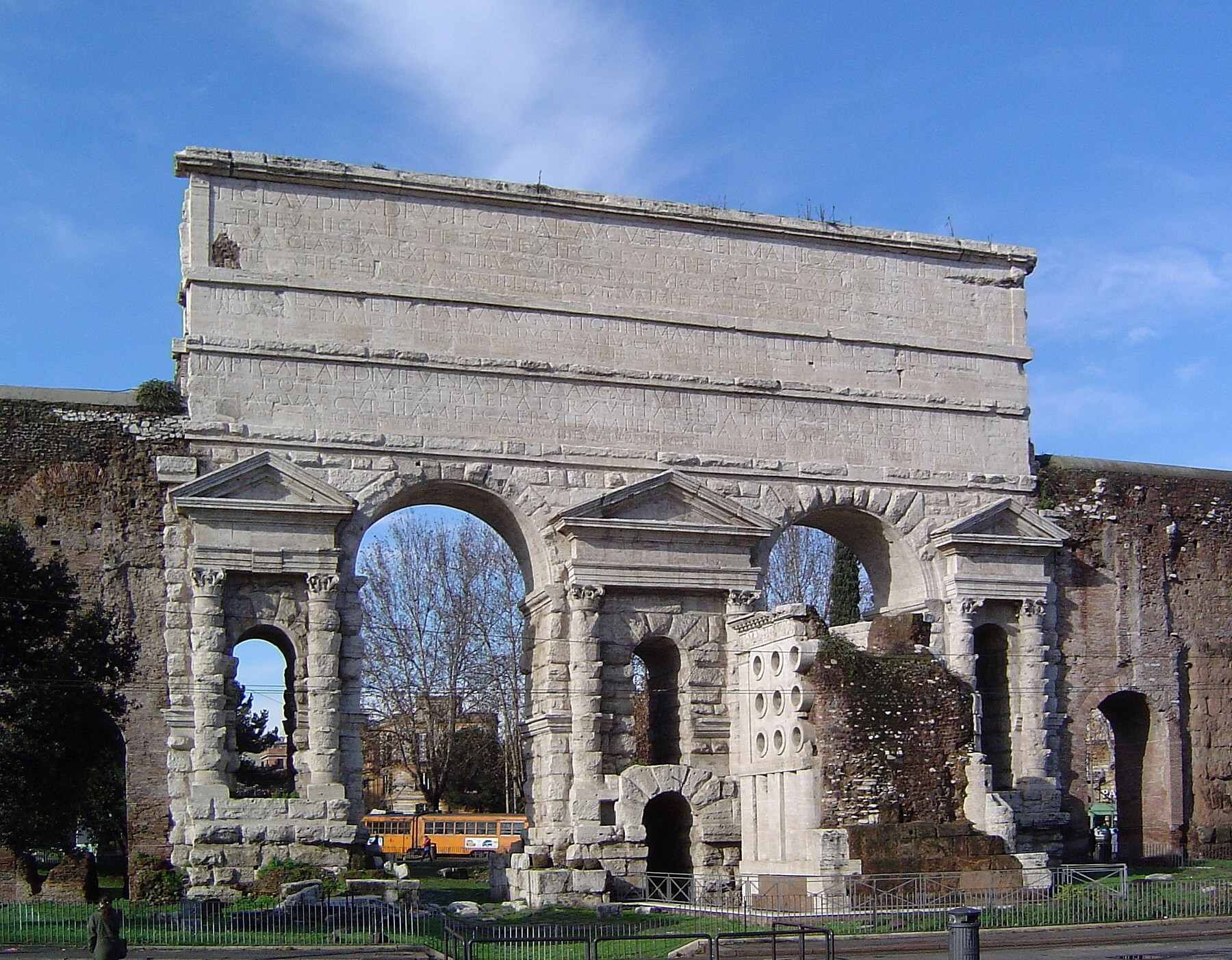
Remains of aqueducts Aqua Claudia and Aqua Anio Novus, integrated into the Aurelian Wall as a gate in 271 AD.

Frontinus's chief work is De aquaeductu, in two books, an official report to the emperor on the state of the aqueducts of Rome. It presents a history and description of the water-supply of Rome, including the laws relating to its use and maintenance. He provides the history, sizes and discharge rates of all of the nine aqueducts of Rome at the time at which he was writing at the turn of the 1st century AD: the Aqua Marcia, Aqua Appia, Aqua Alsietina, Aqua Tepula, Anio Vetus, Anio Novus, Aqua Virgo, Aqua Claudia and Aqua Augusta. Frontinus describes the quality of water delivered by each, mainly depending on their source, be it river, lake, or spring.

==== Fraud and theft ====
One of the first jobs he undertook when he was appointed water commissioner was to prepare maps of the system so that he could assess their condition before undertaking their maintenance. He says that many had been neglected and were not working at their full capacity. He was especially concerned by diversion of the supply by unscrupulous farmers and tradesmen, among many others. They would insert pipes into the channel of the aqueducts to tap the supply. He, therefore, made a meticulous survey of the intake and the supply of each line, and then investigated the discrepancies. Lead pipe stamps bearing the name of the owner were also used to prevent such water theft. He was well aware of the seminal work De architectura by Vitruvius, which mentions aqueduct construction and maintenance published in the previous century; Frontinus refers to the possible influence of Vitruvius on the plumbers.

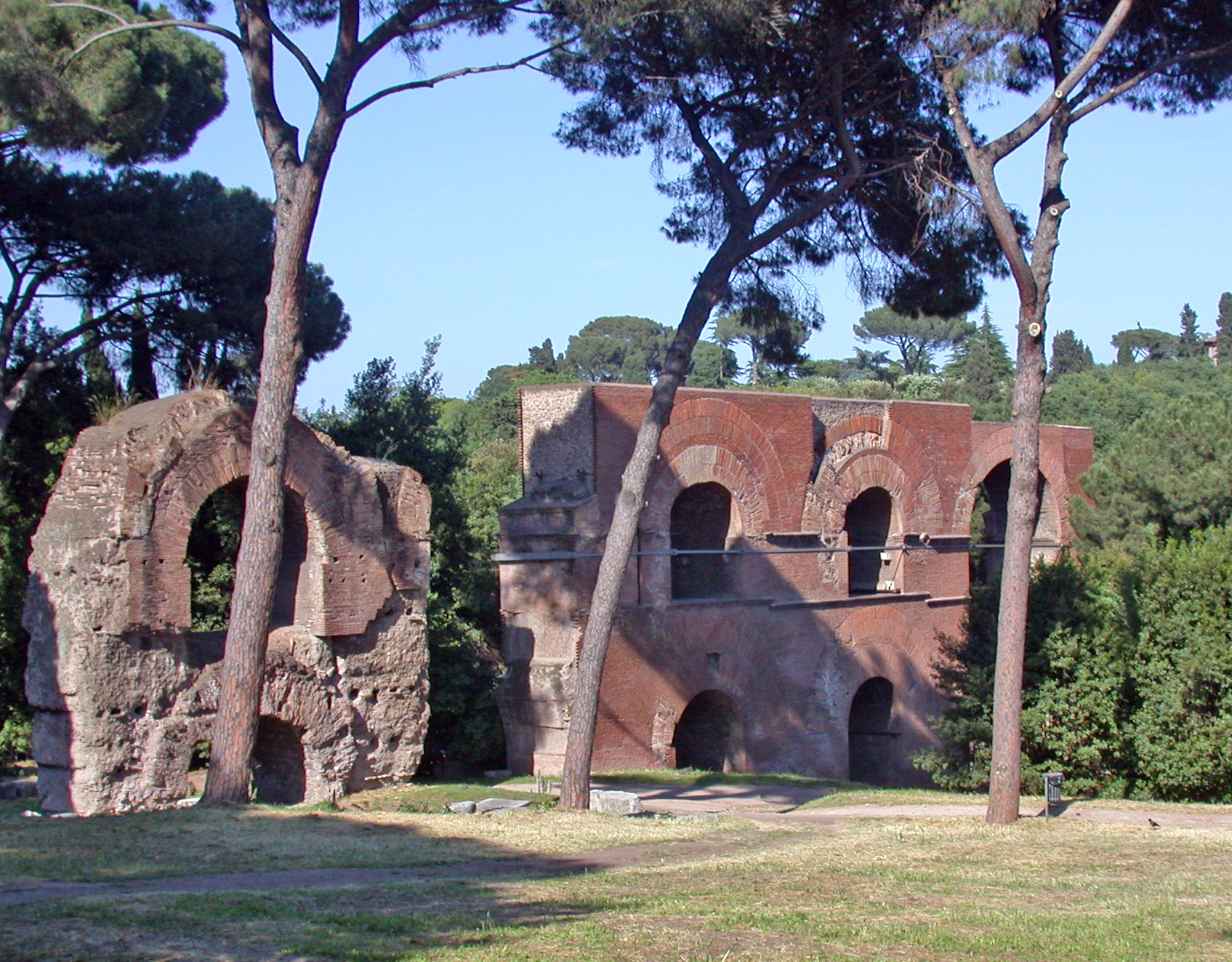
Remains of Aqua Claudia

==== Distribution system ====
Distribution of the water depended in a complex way on its height entering the city, the quality of the water, and its rate of discharge. Thus, poor-quality water would be sent for irrigation, gardens, or flushing, while only the best would be reserved for drinking water. Intermediate-quality water would be used for the many baths and fountains. However, Frontinus criticized the practice of mixing supplies from different sources, and one of his first decisions was to separate the waters from each system.

==== Maintenance ====
He was very concerned by leaks in the system, especially those in the underground conduits, which were difficult to locate and mend, a problem still faced by water engineers today. The aqueducts above ground needed care to ensure that the masonry was kept in good condition, especially those running on arched superstructures. It was, he said, essential to keep trees at a distance so that their roots would not damage the structures. He reviewed the existing law governing the state aqueducts, as well as the need for enforcement of those statutes.

=== Military tactics ===
Frontinus also wrote a theoretical treatise on military science, which is lost. His extant work on military matters, the Stratagems (Latin: Strategemata), is a collection of examples of military stratagems from Greek and Roman history, for the use of generals. He draws on his own experience as a general in Germania under Domitian, but similarities between the anecdotes he records and versions of other Roman authors like Valerius Maximus and Livy suggest that he drew mainly on literary sources. The authenticity of the fourth book has been challenged. One example he gives of control of river water during a siege reads:

Lucius Metellus, when fighting in Hither Spain, diverted the course of a river and directed it from a higher level against the camp of the enemy, which was located on low ground. Then, when the enemy were in a panic from the sudden flood, he had them slain by men whom he had stationed in ambush for this very purpose.

== Selected editions and translations ==
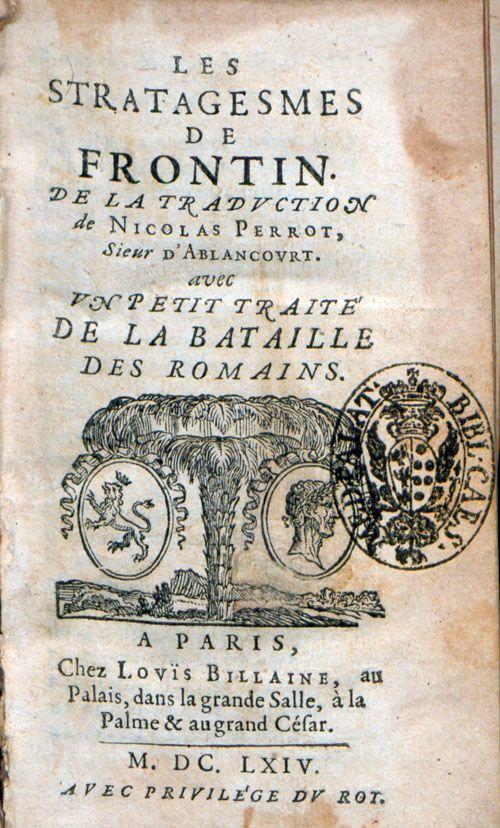
Stratagemata, 1664

=== De aquaeductu ===
- The standard edition of the Latin text of Frontinus' major work, with extensive commentary in English, is now R.H. Rodgers, Frontinus: De aquaeductu urbis Romae (Cambridge University Press, 2004).
- Rodgers has published his English translation online
- An English translation by Charles E. Bennet, edited by Mary B. McElwain, has been published in the Loeb Classical Library.
- A translation by Herschel is useful for his commentary on the engineering aspects of the De aquaeductu.

=== Other works ===
- The latest edition of the Stratagems is by R. I. Ireland (Teubner, 1990 ISBN 3-322-00746-4) (in Latin); English translation in Loeb Classical Library (translated by Charles Bennet and edited by Mary B. McElwain), 1925. ISBN 9780674991927
- Extracts from a treatise on land surveying ascribed to Frontinus are preserved in B. Campbell (2000), The Writings of the Roman Land Surveyors: Introduction, Text, Translation and Commentary, London.
- The Stratagems and The Aqueducts of Rome, translated by Charles E. BENNETT (1858 - 1921), available on Librivox as an audiobook.

== In fiction ==
He appears as a fictionalised character in the Marcus Didius Falco novels The Silver Pigs, Shadows in Bronze, Three Hands in the Fountain, and The Jupiter Myth. He also appears as a character in The Centurions novels Barbarian Princess and The Emperor's Games.

== See also ==
- Cloaca Maxima
- Dolaucothi
- Gromatici
- List of aqueducts in the city of Rome
- List of aqueducts in the Roman Empire
- List of Roman aqueducts by date
- Quinaria
- Roman aqueducts
- Roman conquest of Britain
- Aggenus Urbicus

Political offices
Preceded by Lucius Aelius Oculatus, and Quintus Gavius Atticus as Suffect consuls	Suffect Consul of the Roman Empire; 73 with ignotus	Succeeded by Vespasian V, and Titus III as Ordinary consuls
Preceded by Gnaeus Domitius Afer Curvius Tullus II	Suffect Consul of the Roman Empire; 98 with Trajan II	Succeeded by Lucius Julius Ursus II
Preceded by Tiberius Julius Ferox, and ignotus as Suffect consuls	Consul of the Roman Empire; 100 with Trajan III, followed by Lucius Julius Ursus III	Succeeded by Marcus Marcius Macer, and Gaius Cilnius Proculus as Suffect consuls
Preceded by Quintus Petillius Cerialis	Roman governors of Britain; 73/4-77	Succeeded by Gnaeus Julius Agricola
