= De Munitionibus Castrorum =

De Munitionibus Castrorum ("Concerning the fortifications of a military camp") is a work by an unknown author. Due to this work formerly being attributed to Hyginus Gromaticus, its author is often called "Pseudo-Hyginus". This work is the most detailed surviving description of a Roman military camp (Latin: castra) and dates most probably from the late 1st to early 2nd century AD.

== The author and the time of creation of the work ==
Very little is known about the author of De munitionibus castrorum. According to the text, his work was intended to be a useful manual about how to properly lay out a military camp, specially written for a high-ranked officer:

"novitatem metationis ad magnitudinem tuam primus adferam, quae tibi spero placebit, si primum cottidianam metationem tractabis"

He also suggests that he was a beginner author and used other authors' works relevant to the theme:

"In quantum potui, domine frater, pro tirocinio meo, in brevi omnes auctores sum persecutus, sed quidquid circa compositionem castrorum aestalivium instituerunt, in hoc libello, priusquam numeros instituerem, sub ratione omnia declaravi"

The exact date of creation of the work is also uncertain. According to Domaszewski, it is certain that the work was not written before the time of the Roman emperor Trajan (it mentions Daci amongst the auxiliary forces), and was before the reforms of Diocletian (the Roman legion has its traditional structure). Domaszewski suggested that the image of the camp best fits the early second century AD, prior to the reforms of Hadrian.

Experts, however, still dispute the date, ranging from the earliest dating to the rule of Domitian.

It is also disputed whether such a large camp was ever built by the Romans. Archaeological finds clearly show that in actual practice a military camp was not always so regularly organized, as suggested by the author.

But, as he describes even the smallest part of the camp (including how much space is required for a soldier or a horse), it may be adopted to the requirements of the practice. He also mentions some general rules which must be considered when constructing a camp, although most of them are obvious (like a water source must be in the vicinity, etc.).

== Original Manuscript ==
The text survives in the Codex Arcerianus, a collection of agrimensores in the Herzog-August-Bibliothek at Wolfenbüttel (Cod. Guelf. 36.23A). However, it has been distorted by numerous corruptions, necessitating heavy editing. Thus, the text published by Domaszewski differs from that of Grillone, while Lenoir's text differs from both. A new Latin text (with English translation) has now been published.

- Corpus Agrimensorum Romanorum: Codex arcerianus A der Herzog-August-Bibliothek zu Wolfenbüttel (Cod. Guelf. 36.23A), Codices Graeci et Latini photographice depicti Vol. XXII, ed. H. Butzmann. Lugduni Batavorum: A.W. Sijthoff, 1970. (includes facsimile of Codex Arcerianus, which contains De munitionibus castrorum). Online here.

== Editions ==
- C.C.L. Lange, Hygini Gromatici, Liber De Munitionibus Castrorum (Göttingen 1848). Latin text and commentary in Latin.
- W. Gemoll, Hygini Gromatici, Liber De Munitionibus Castrorum (Leipzig 1879). Latin text.
- A. von Domaszewski, Hygini Gromatici, Liber De Munitionibus Castrorum (Leipzig 1887). Latin text, German translation, and short essay on the work in German.
- A. Grillone, Hygini qui dicitur de Metatione Castrorum Liber (Leipzig 1977). Latin text.
- M. Lenoir, Pseudo-Hygin, Des Fortifications du Camp (Paris 1979). Latin text, French translation, and copious notes on the work in French.
- A. Grillone, Gromatica militare: lo ps. Igino. Prefazione, testo, traduzione e commento (Brussels 2012). Latin text (basically Grillone's 1977 text), Italian translation, and commentary in Italian.
- Duncan B. Campbell, Fortifying a Roman Camp. The Liber de munitionibus castrorum of Hyginus (Glasgow 2018). Latin text, facing-page English translation, apparatus criticus.

== English Translations ==
- Catherine M. Gilliver: The de munitionibus castrorum: Text and Translation. Journal of Roman Military Equipment Studies, Volume 4, 1993. 33–48. (Grillone's 1977 Latin text; also includes a short introduction, and a short bibliography of the most important literature)
- Alan Richardson - Theoretical Aspects of Roman Camp and Fort Design (BAR, 2004) ISBN 1-84171-390-2 (includes a 1925 translation of "De Munitionibus Castrorum" by Ian A. Richmond).
- Duncan B. Campbell, Fortifying a Roman Camp: The Liber de munitionibus castrorum of Hyginus. ASIN 1717957560 Includes a new Latin text with facing-page English translation and apparatus criticus.
