= Hyginus Gromaticus =

Latin writer

Hyginus, usually distinguished as Hyginus Gromaticus, was a Latin writer on land-surveying, who flourished in the reign of Trajan (AD 98–117). Fragments of a work on boundaries attributed to him are found in Corpus Agrimensorum Romanorum, a collection of works on land surveying compiled in Late Antiquity.

== Name ==
The cognomen gromaticus means "agrimensor" or "surveyor" and derives from groma, one of their common tools in antiquity. Its application to Hyginus derives from the Codex Arcerianus, whose copy of the Corpus Agrimensorum Romanorum reads in part exp[licit] Kygini gromatici constitutio feliciter ("The establishment of Kyginus the Surveyor explains well..."). Other manuscripts of the text like the Palatinus Vatic. Lat. 1564 have instead explicit liber Hygini gromaticus ("The book of Hyginus on surveying explains..."), in which the adjective gromaticus is grammatically attached to the book rather than the author. For this reason, some scholars like Brian Campbell avoid the epithet and instead call him simply Hyginus or Hyginus 1 (to distinguish him from another Hyginus whose work appears in the same text).

== Works ==
Hyginus was probably active around the year 100.

His only extant work is De Constitutione [Limitum] ("On the Establishment [of Boundaries]") in the Corpus Agrimensorum Romanorum ("Body of Roman Surveying"), a collection compiled in Late Antiquity. De Constitutione is preserved only in a corrupt text, but its contents include important evidence on the Latin reception of Greek astronomical and mathematical texts. Notably, in his discussion of the establishment of the decumanus and cardo—the main east–west and north–south thoroughfares in most Roman towns—Hyginus is decidedly in favour of the construction of the decumanus using a gnomon (sundial) and compares this method with other less precise methods such as using the location of sunrise and sunset. The text has some connection with a passage included in Bubnov's Geometria Incerti Auctori ("Geometric Works of Unknown Authors"). Editions of the work appear in C. F. Lachmann's Gromatici Veteres, Vol. I (1848), Carl Olof Thulin's Corpus Agrimensorum Romanorum, Vol. I (1913), and Brian Campbell's Writings of the Roman Land Surveyors (2000).

Another work by Hyginus, Liber Gromaticus de Divisionibus Agrorum ("Surveying Book on the Division of Fields") is transmitted only as a title and might be the same as De Constitutio.

A treatise on Roman military camps (De Munitionibus Castrorum) was formerly attributed to this Hyginus, but it was probably composed later, around the 3rd century and is thus now attributed to "Pseudo-Hyginus".

== Bibliography ==
- '
- F. Blume, K. Lachmann, K. Rudorff (ed.): Gromatici veteres. Die Schriften der römischen Feldmesser. 2 Volumes. Berlin 1848–52, pp. 166–208. (online)
- N. Bubnov: Gerberti postea Silvestri II papae Opera mathematica (972-1003). Berlin 1899. (Reprint: Hildesheim 2005). (online)
- B. Campbell. The writings of the Roman land surveyors. Introduction, translation and commentary (= Journal of the Roman Studies Monographs. 9). London 2000.
- M. Clavel-Lévêque, D. Conso, A. Gonzales, J.-Y. Guillaumin et al. Corpus Agrimensorum Romanorum V. Hygin, L'Œuvre gromatique. Luxembourg 2000. (online)
- J.-Y. Guillaumin. Les arpenteurs romains. Tome 1: Hygin le Gromatique, Frontin. (= Les belles Lettres 1, Collection des universités de France Série latine). Paris 2005.
- J-O. Lindermann, E. Knobloch, C. Möller. Hyginus – Das Feldmesserbuch. Ein Meisterwerk der spätantiken Buchkunst. Herausgegeben, übersetzt und mit Kommentaren versehen, Darmstadt 2018 (edition with German translation and commentary).
- J.-O. Lindermann. Hygini liber gromaticus de limitibus constituendis. Historisch-kritische Edition und Erläuterungen. Darmstadt 2022 (critical edition).
- Thulin, Carl Olof (1913). Corpus Agrimensorum Romanorum. Vol. 1.1: Opuscula Agrimensorum Veterum. Leipzig: B. G. Teubner. pp. 131–171.
