= Duncan B. Campbell =

British scholar of Greek and Roman warfare

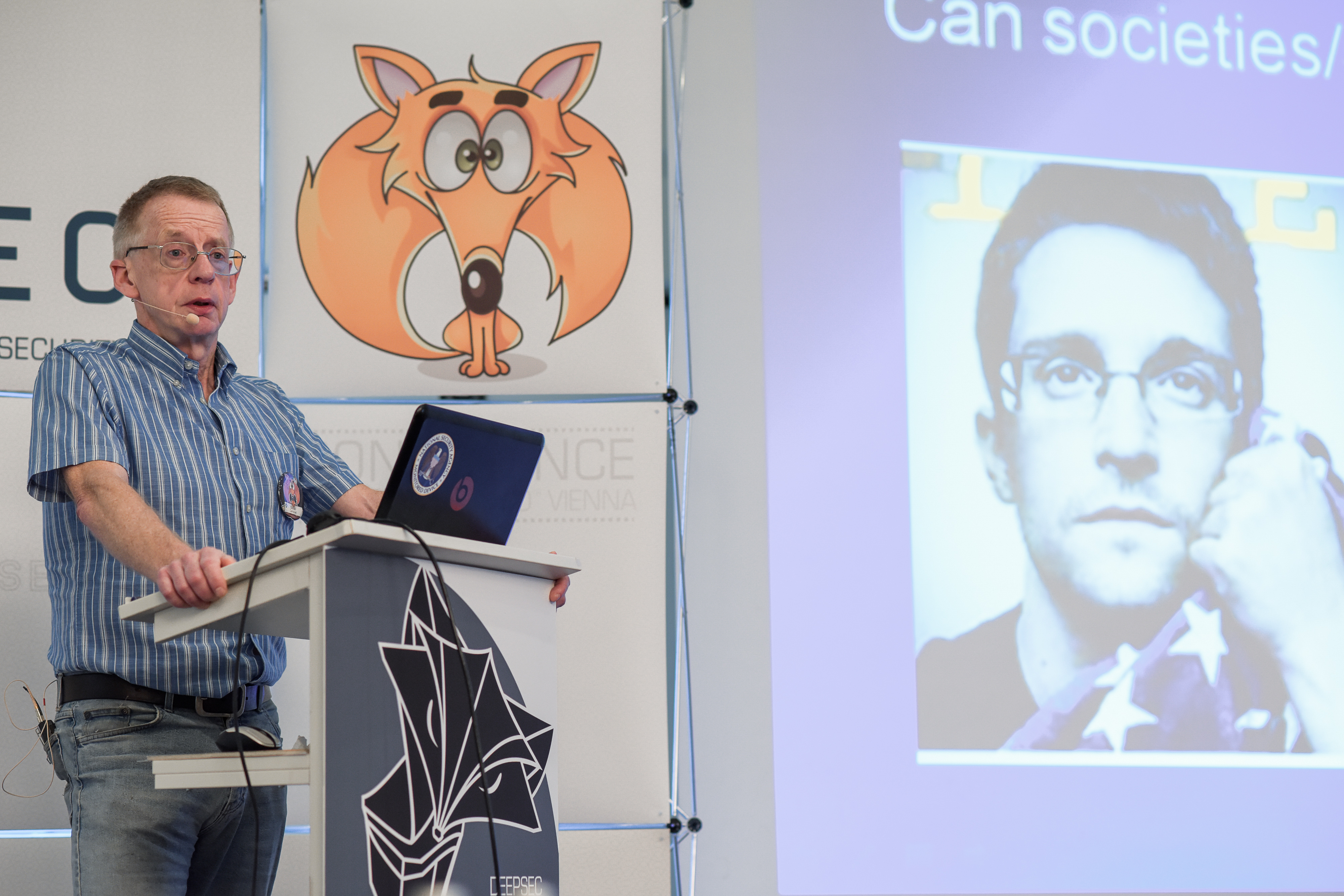
Campbell presenting at DeepSec In Depth Security Conference, 2015

Duncan B. Campbell is a British scholar of Greek and Roman warfare. He published his first paper in 1984, as an undergraduate at the Glasgow University, Scotland, and produced a complete re-assessment of Roman siegecraft for his PhD. Besides academic articles, he has written several other popular books about ancient warfare, chiefly siegecraft, published by Osprey Publishing. He has been a regular contributor to Ancient Warfare magazine and a frequent reviewer for Bryn Mawr Classical Review. He has published a new edition, with English translation, of the Roman military source known as the Liber de munitionibus castrorum, and a new edition, with English translation and detailed commentary, of the Ektaxis kat' Alanōn of Arrian.

== Critical acclaim ==
Campbell's work has frequently been critically acclaimed, both for its informed content and for its accessible style.

The Fate of the Ninth: The curious disappearance of one of Rome's legions (2018) has been called "A tale well told, written with exemplary clarity and scholarship", "a splendid book ... History at many levels and all very well done", and an "elegantly written book ... essential reading for anyone interested in the history of the Roman army". The Classics For All website called it "a model monograph. And it is beautifully written".

Phantom Horsemen: Exploding the myth of the Emperor Gallienus' battle cavalry (2025) has been called " a very thorough and fascinating investigation", a "superb devastating debunking of the myth of the battle cavalry army", and "proper history and historiography. Essential reading on the Crisis of the Third Century". The journal Electrum insisted that "the author's erudition and substantive arguments in support of his position deserve great recognition. Moreover, the clear language of this work makes it a pleasure to read".
