= Castra =

Roman term for a fortified military base

Templeborough Roman fort in South Yorkshire visualised 3D flythrough, produced for Rotherham Museums and Archives

Castra (pl.) is a Latin term used during the Roman Republic and Roman Empire for a military 'camp', and castrum (sing.) for a 'fort'.

In current English use, the peculiarity of the noun having different meanings in the singular and plural is sometimes less rigorously observed, given that both meanings indicate fortified positions used by the Roman army.

A castrum was the fortified base of a Roman legion, a detachment thereof, or of auxiliary units, providing secure locations for training, administration, and defense. The army used a variety of fortified positions, both in size and function, ranging from temporary marching camps (castra aestiva) to large, permanent fortresses (castra stativa) that housed entire legions. They were typically designed with a standardized layout, including a rectangular plan, defensive walls, gates, and internal streets arranged in a grid pattern, reflecting Roman military discipline and engineering expertise. Permanent castra often became the foundations for towns and cities across the Roman Empire, many of which still bear traces of their Roman origins in their modern layouts and names. These fortifications played a crucial role in the expansion and maintenance of Roman power, enabling the army to project control over vast territories and respond quickly to threats.

== Etymology ==
Castrum appears in Oscan and Umbrian, two other Italic languages, suggesting an origin at least as old as Proto-Italic. Julius Pokorny traces a probable derivation from *k̂es-, 'cut', in *k̂es-tro-m, 'cutting tool'. These Italic reflexes based on *kastrom include Oscan castrous (genitive case) and Umbrian castruo, kastruvuf (accusative case). They have the same meaning, says Pokorny, as Latin fundus, 'estate', 'tract of land', referring to a prepared or cultivated tract, such as a farm enclosed by a fence or wall. Cornelius Nepos uses Latin castrum in that sense: when Alcibiades deserts to the Persians, Pharnabazus gives him an estate (castrum) worth 500 talents in tax revenues. This is a change of meaning from the reflexes in other languages, which still mean some sort of knife, axe, or spear. Pokorny explains it as "a camp, as a cut-off piece of land".

If this is the civilian interpretation, the military version must be "military reservation", a piece of land cut off from the common land around it and modified for military use. All castra must be defended by works, often no more than a stockade, for which the soldiers carried stakes, and a ditch. The castra could be prepared under attack within a hollow square or behind a battle line. Considering that the earliest military shelters were tents made of hide or cloth, and all but the most permanent bases housed the men in tents placed in quadrangles and separated by numbered streets, one castrum may well have acquired the connotation of tent. (Note: Many uncited Latin dictionaries make this suggestion.)

=== Linguistic development ===
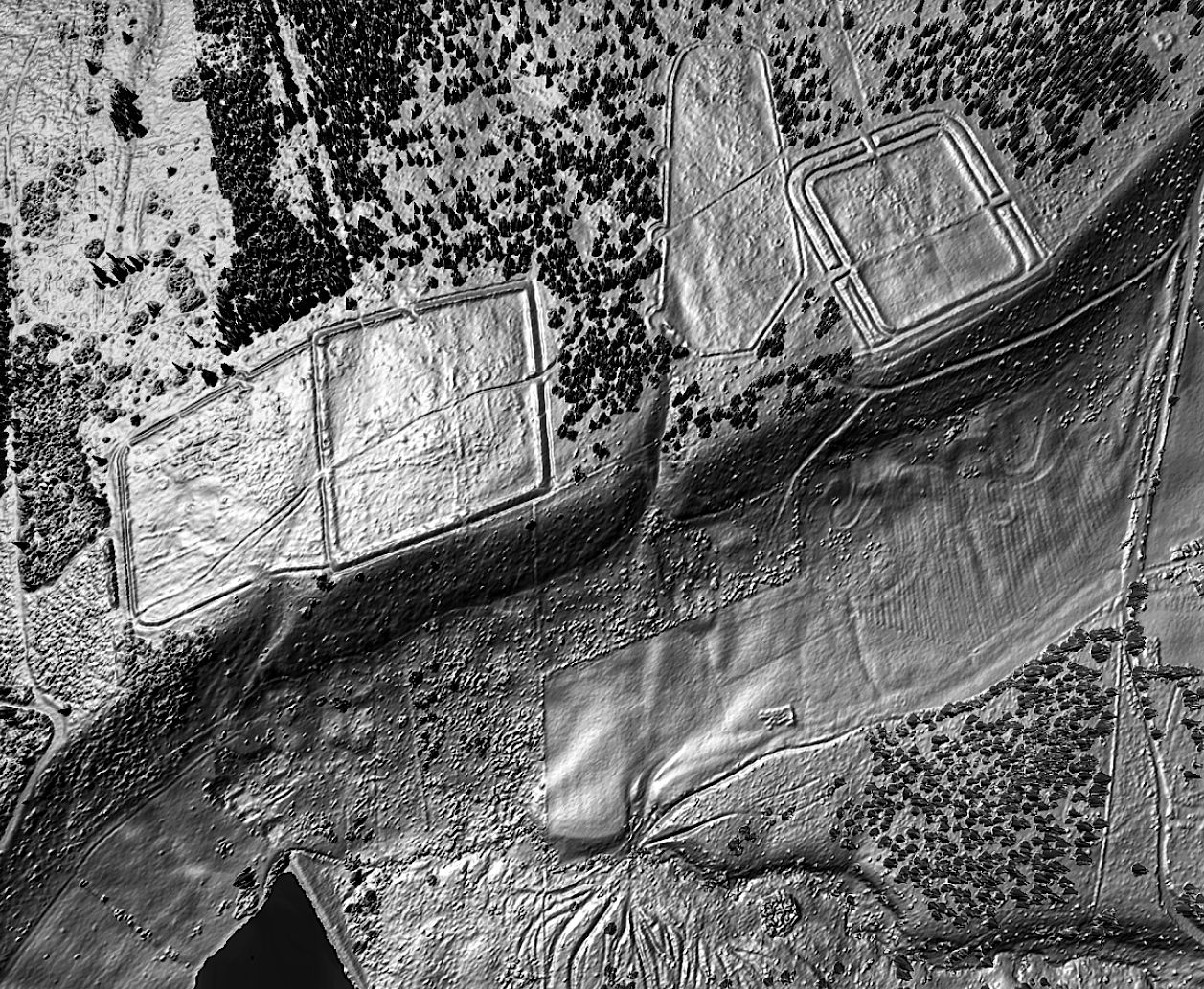
A lidar view of th Cawthorne Camp site in North Yorkshire, consisting of a camp and two forts: the western fort (right), square and cutting into the polygonal camp (left of it), and the eastern simple fort (left) with an eastern annexe (further left).

The commonest Latin syntagmata (here phrases) for the term castra are:

castra stativa
Permanent camp/fortresses
castra aestiva
Summer camp/fortresses
castra hiberna
Winter camp/fortresses
castra navalia / castra nautica
Navy camp/fortresses

In Latin the term castrum is much more frequently used as a proper name for geographical locations: e.g., Castrum Album, Castrum Inui, Castrum Novum, Castrum Truentinum, Castrum Vergium. The plural was also used as a place name, as Castra Cornelia, and from this comes the Welsh place name prefix caer- (e.g. Caerleon and Caerwent) and English suffixes -caster and -chester (e.g. Winchester and Lancaster). Castrorum Filius, "son of the camps", was one of the names used by the emperor Caligula and then also by other emperors.

Castro, also derived from Castrum, is a common Spanish family name as well as toponym in Spain and other Hispanophone countries, Italy, and the Balkans, either by itself or in various compounds such as the World Heritage Site of Gjirokastër (earlier Argurokastro). In Greek, writers used the terms stratopedon ('army camp') and phrourion ('fortification') to translate castrum and castellum, respectively.

== Description ==
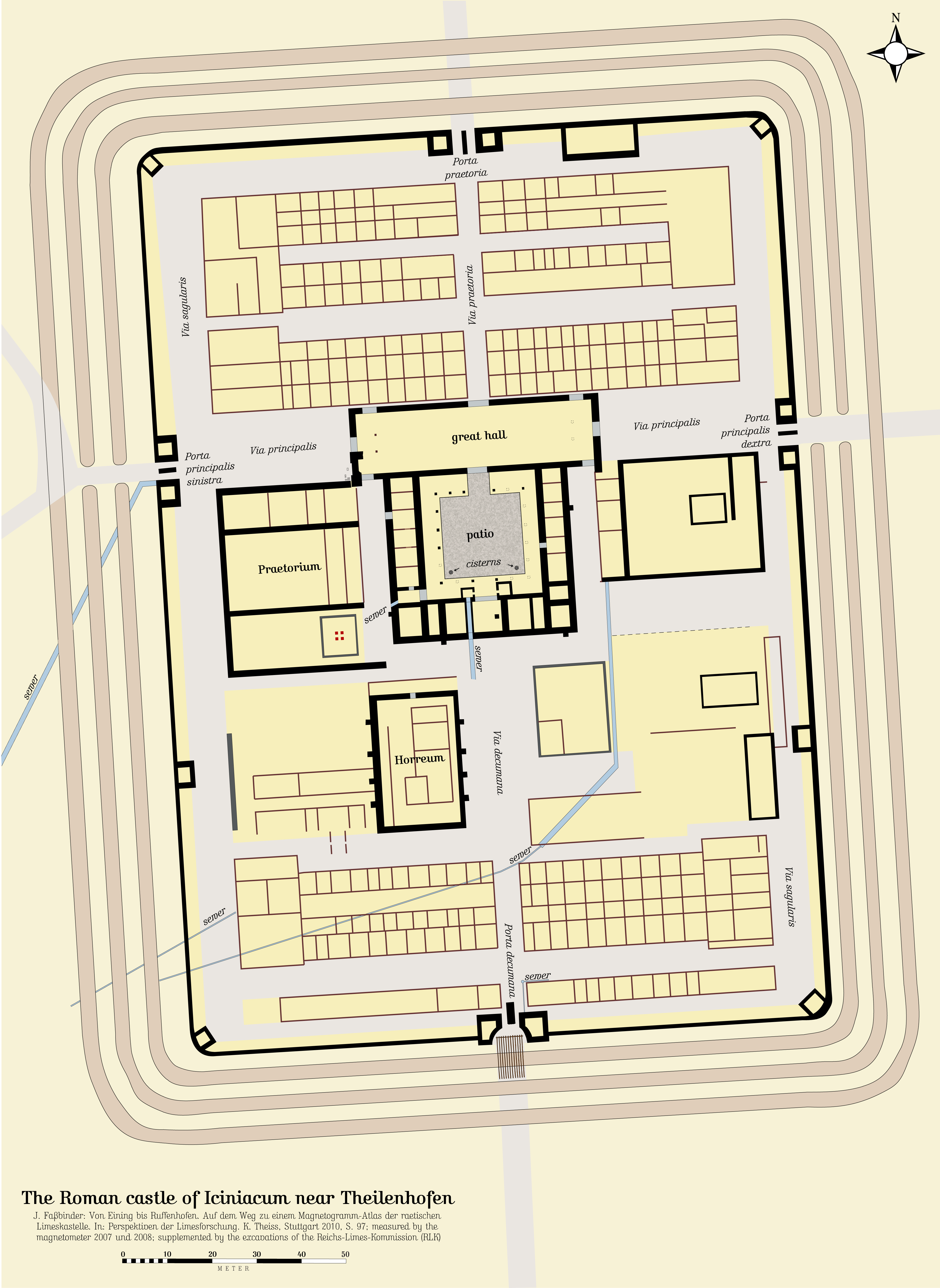
Plan of a typical Roman fort

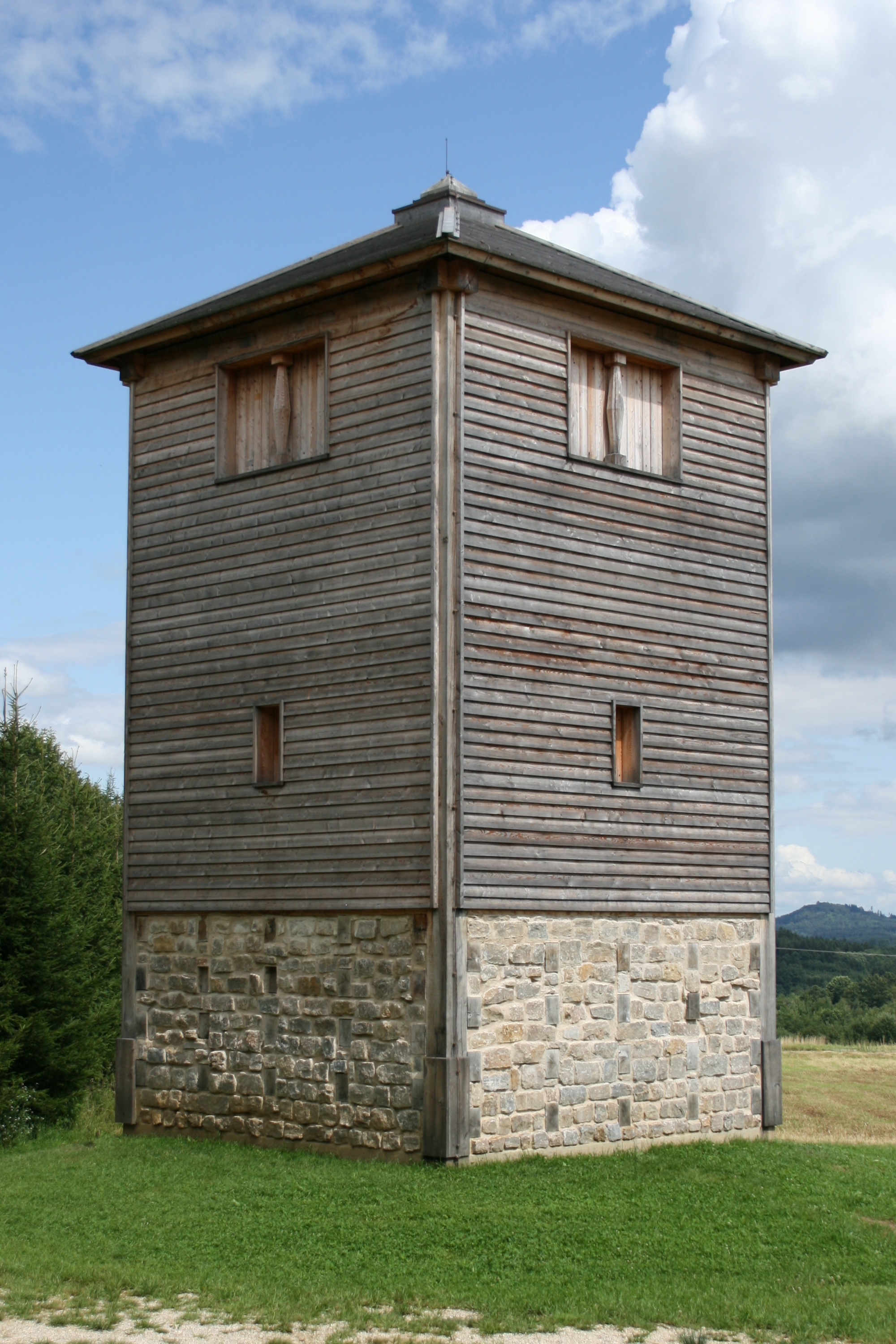
Reconstruction of the specula or vigilarium (Germanic burgus), "watchtower", a type of castrum, at Rainau-Buch, Germany. An ancient watchtower would have been surrounded by wall and ditch.

=== List of Latin terms ===
- munimentum - base, "fortification"

Fortifications

- vallum - "wall"; normally quadrangular, aligned N-S and W-E, but this depended on various factors
- fossa - "trench"
- agger - "rampart"
- sudes or valli - stakes forming the palisade on top of the rampart

Gates

- porta praetoria - front gate, facing the enemy, main among the 4 gates
- porta decumana - rear gate, opposite the porta praetoria
- porta principalis dextra - "right principal gate", right-side gate as one looked from the section toward the main, i.e. praetorian gate; set along the via principalis
- porta principalis sinistra, "left principal gate"
- turres, "towers"; protected the gates

Space right behind the walls

- intervallum - clear space inside the vallum; offered storage space for capita (cattle) and praeda (plunder)
- via sagularis, road running around the entire perimeter just inside the walls

Main streets and sections

- via sagularis, perimeter road: see above
- via praetoria, extending from main gate toward the central section
- via principalis, intersects at right angles with via praetoria
- via quintana
- via decumana - road between porta decumana (rear gateway) and via quintana

The front via principalis and the rear via quintana divided the camp into three latitudinal districts: the frontal praetentura, the central latera praetorii, and the rear retentura.

- latera praetorii, central section, between via principalis and via quintana; housed most important buildings
- praetentura, section between front wall and via principalis
- retentura, area between via quintana and rear wall

Buildings

- principia, headquarters, facing main gateway; in central section
- praetorium, the residence of the commanding officer; in central section
- bathhouse
- valetudinarium, hospital
- horrea, storage buildings
- barracks: see striga, hemistriga, centuria, contubernium

=== Sources and origins ===
From the most ancient times Roman camps were constructed according to a certain ideal pattern, formally described in two main sources, the De Munitionibus Castrorum and the works of Polybius. (Note: Alan Richardson compares both original authors and concludes that "the Hyginian model greatly reduced the area and perimeter length for any given force. P. Fl. Vegetius Renatus has a small section on entrenched camps as well. The terminology varies, but the basic plan is the same.)

=== Construction and layout ===
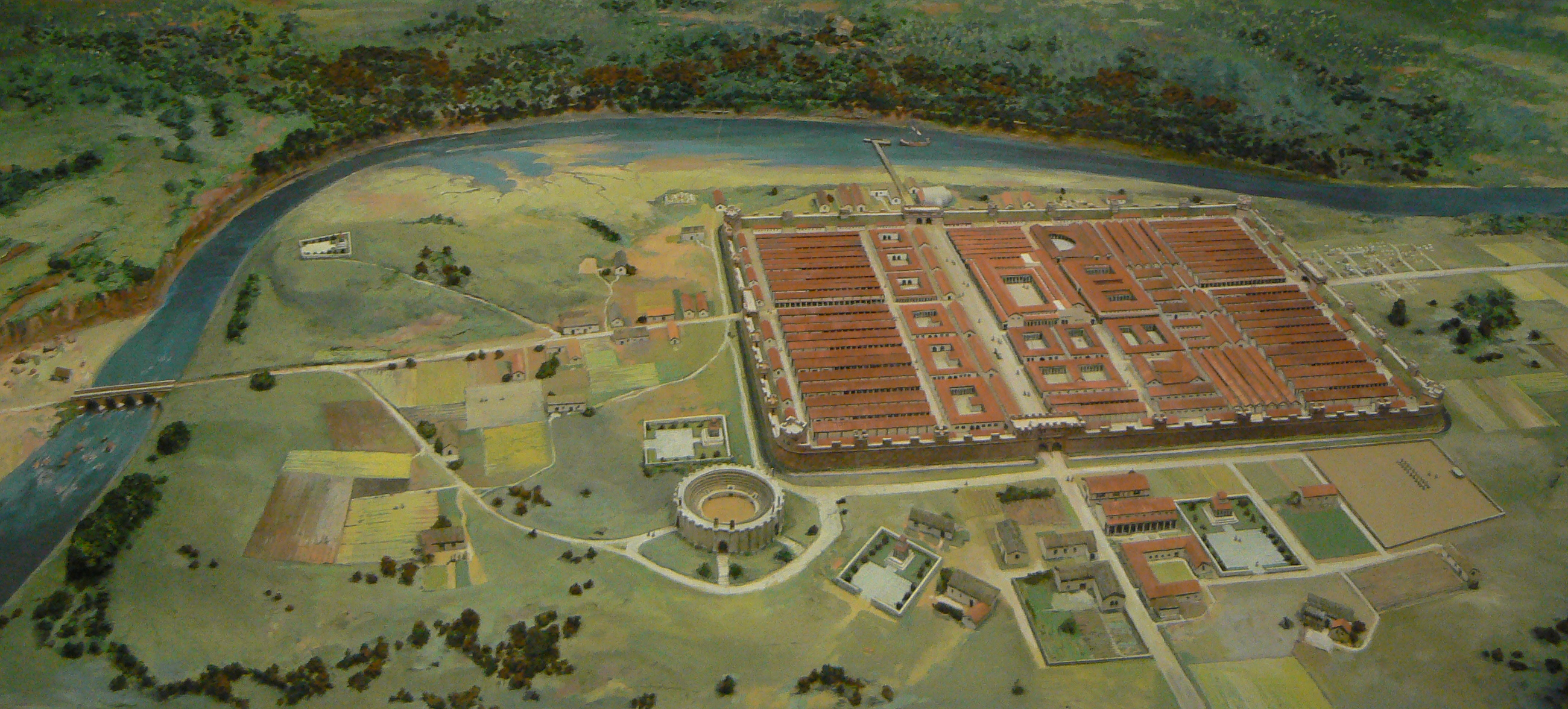
Model of the legionary fortress of Deva (Chester) plus adjoining amphitheatre in Britannia (reconstruction)

The first step in constructing a castrum was selecting an appropriate location. This was a critical decision, as the site had to meet several strategic and practical criteria: The site was chosen for its defensibility, often on elevated terrain, near rivers, hills, or other natural barriers. It also needed to provide a good vantage point for observing the surrounding area and controlling key roads or supply routes. The camp needed access to water sources, such as rivers or springs, and nearby woodlands for construction materials like timber. While elevated positions were preferable for defense, the site itself had to be relatively flat to allow for efficient construction and ensure internal order. Good drainage was also essential. Once the site was identified, surveyors mensorēs arrived to assess its suitability and begin the layout.

At first the center of the camp was determined where the via praetoria and the via principalis would intersect and thus dividing the camp into northern and southern halves. The intersection of these two roads formed the camp's central point, around which the rest of the layout was measured. Using tools like groma the mensorēs laid out the rectangular perimeter of the camp. The camp was divided into equal quadrants for easy organization and movement. Four gates were positioned at the cardinal points:

- porta praetoria - front gate, facing the enemy
- porta decumana - rear gate, opposite the porta praetoria
- porta principalis dextra - right-side gate along the via principalis
- porta principalis sinistra - left-side gate along the via principalis (Note: Richardson writes that from the aspect ratio of the castra one could determine the order of battle, and the size of the legion it housed determined the area of the camp. Steinhoff theorizes that Richardson has identified a commonality and builds on the latter's detailed studies to suggest that North African encampments in the time of Hadrian were based on the same geometrical skill.)

=== Wall and ditch ===
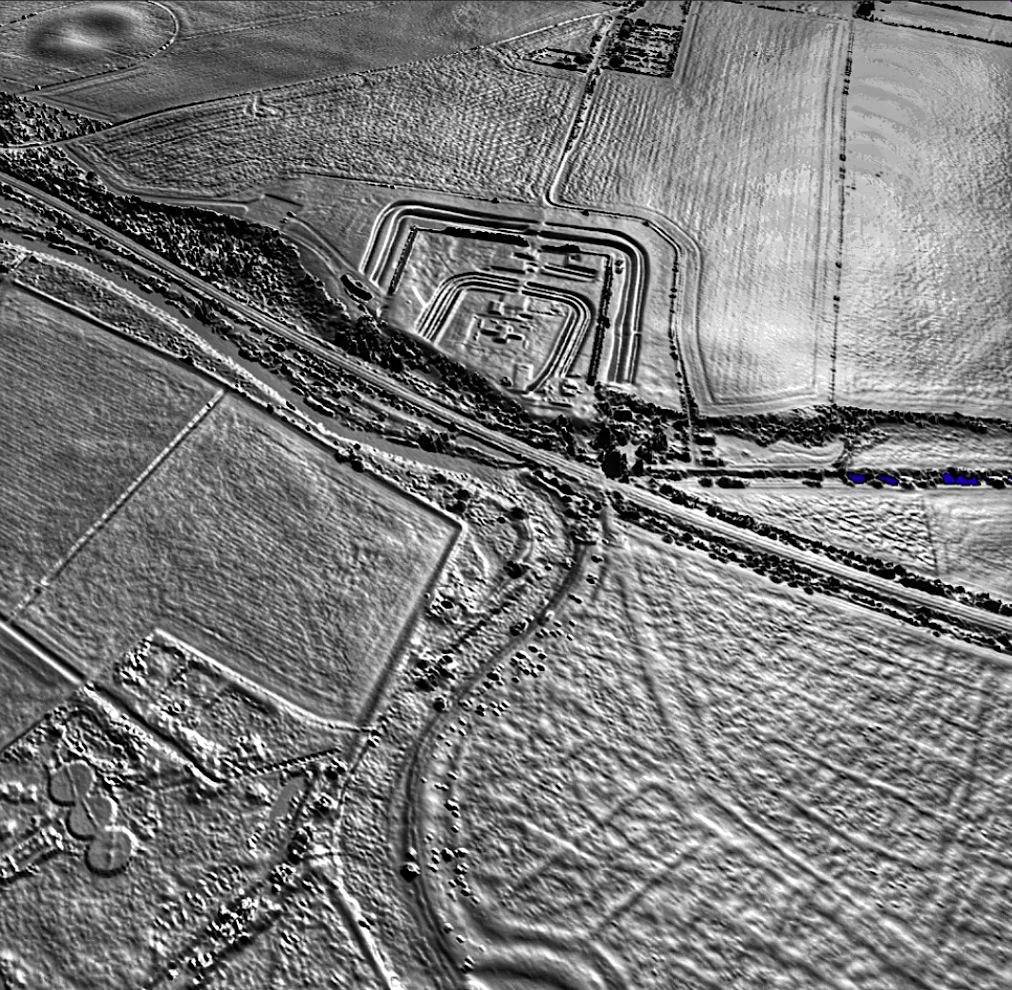
A lidar view of Richborough Roman fort, whose remains lie along the River Stour (in Roman times: the Wantsum Channel), seen running horizontally across the image: a small square-shaped military camp (AD 250s) inside the larger and slightly offset square of the Saxon Shore Fort (AD 275), both marked by the outline of ditches, partially affected by shore collapse, and an amphitheatre (the circular shape in the top-left) at the site of the settlement of Rutupiae in Kent.

The castrum's special structure also defended from attacks. The base (munimentum, "fortification") was placed entirely within the vallum ("wall"), which could be constructed under the protection of the legion in battle formation if necessary. The vallum was quadrangular, aligned on the cardinal points of the compass.The construction crews dug a trench (fossa), throwing the excavated material inward, to be formed into the rampart (agger). On top of this a palisade of stakes (sudes or valli) was erected. The soldiers had to carry these stakes on the march. (Note: The sudes were not just simple stakes. Three or four branches were left on for interlocking.) Over the course of time, the palisade might be replaced by a brick or stone wall, and the ditch served also as a moat. A legion-sized camp placed towers at intervals along the wall with positions between for the division artillery.

=== Intervallum ===
Around the inside periphery of the vallum was a clear space, the intervallum, which served to catch enemy missiles, as an access route to the vallum and as a storage space for cattle (capita) and plunder (praeda). The Romans were masters of geometry and showed it in their camps: a modern study shows that the intervallum "was 1/16th of the square root of the area it enclosed in the fort. Legionaries were quartered in a peripheral zone inside the intervallum, which they could rapidly cross to take up position on the vallum. Inside the legionary quarters was a peripheral road, the via sagularis, probably a type of "service road".

=== Main elements: gates, streets, sections, buildings ===
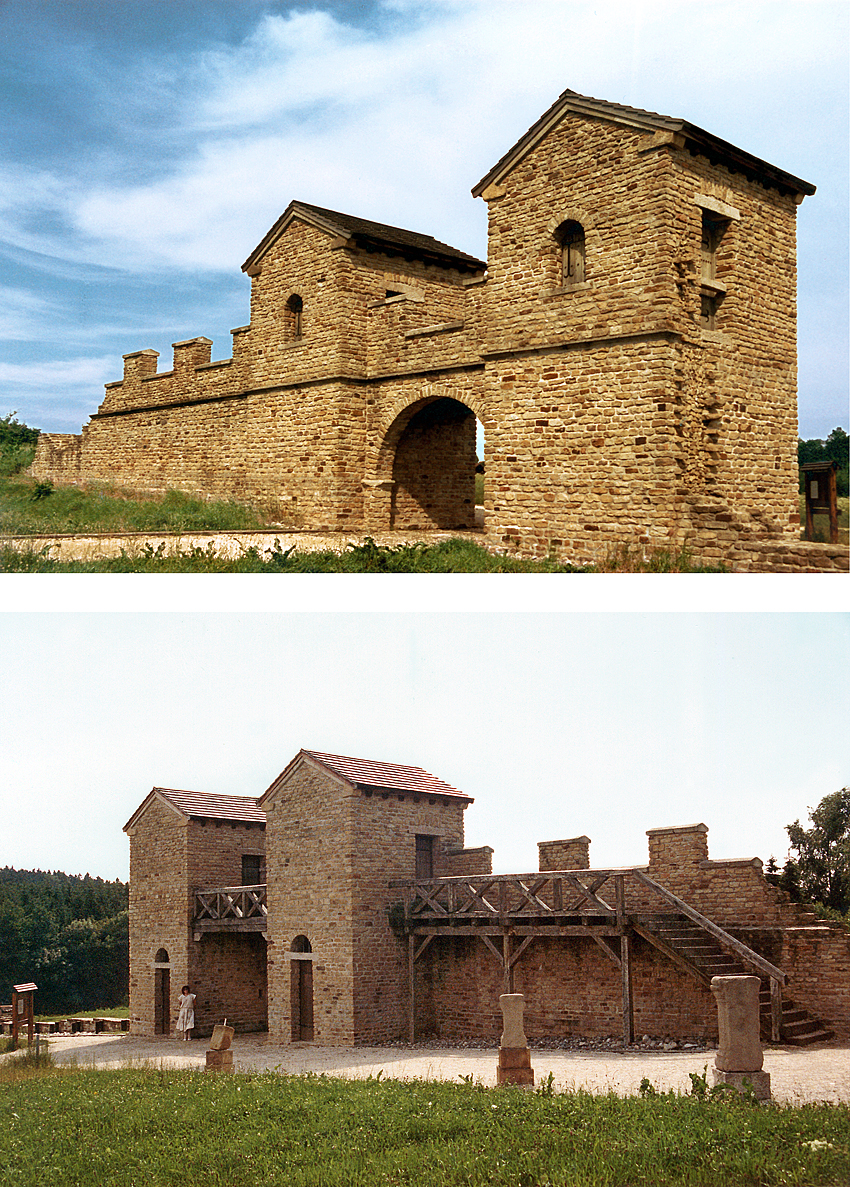
Reconstructed east gate of a castrum stativum, a more permanent base, at Welzheim, Germany

A Roman camp or fortress usually had fortifications (walls and ditches) in the shape of a square or rectangle. It typically featured four gateways, with the principal gateway, the porta praetoria, facing the enemy or main operational direction. It marked the front side of the camp or fortress. The main street, known as the via praetoria, extended longitudinally from the main, praetoria gate, toward the castra's central section which housed the praetorium, the commander's residence. It intersected at right angles with another primary road, the via principalis. The latitudinal via principalis went through the vallum at the porta principalis dextra ("right principal gate", i.e. the gate on the right as one looked from the central section of the castra toward the main gate) and the porta principalis sinistra ("left, etc."). The gates were fortified with turres ("towers").

Just inside the defensive walls and running around the entire perimeter of the fortress, was a major road, the via sagularis.

Another longitudinal road, the via decumana, stretched from the rear gateway, the porta decumana, to the latitudinal via quintana.

Smaller streets branched off to connect the various buildings with the main roads.

The front latitudinal via principalis and the rear latitudinal via quintana divided the camp into three districts: the latera praetorii, the praetentura and the retentura.

==== Praetentura (front section) ====
The section of the fortress located between the front wall and the via principalis was known as the praetentura, where barracks and storage buildings (horrea) were situated.

The praetentura ("stretching to the front") contained the quarters of officers who were below general but higher than company commanders (legati). (Note: The term legatus had other meanings in other contexts, such as governor or ambassador.) Near the principia were the valetudinarium (hospital), veterinarium (for horses), fabrica ("workshop", metals and wood), and further to the front the quarters of special forces. These included classici ("marines", as most European camps were on rivers and contained a river naval command), equites ("cavalry"), speculatores ("scouts"), and vexillarii (carriers of vexilla, the official pennants of the legion and its units). Troops who did not fit elsewhere also were there.

==== Central section (latera praetorii) ====
The central part of the fortress, lying between the lower end of the via principalis and the latitudinal via quintana, was called the latera praetorii and housed the most important buildings.

These included the principia (the headquarters), which was aligned to face the main gateway, the praetorium (the residence of the commanding officer), the bathhouse, and the hospital, known as the valetudinarium.

In the latera ("sides") were the arae (sacrificial altars), the auguratorium (for auspices), the tribunal, where courts martial and arbitrations were conducted (it had a raised platform), the guardhouse, the quarters of various kinds of staff and the storehouses for grain (horrea) or meat (carnarea). Sometimes the horrea were located near the barracks and the meat was stored on the hoof. Analysis of sewage from latrines indicates the legionary diet was mainly grain. Also located in the latera was the armamentarium, a long shed containing any heavy weapons and artillery not on the wall.

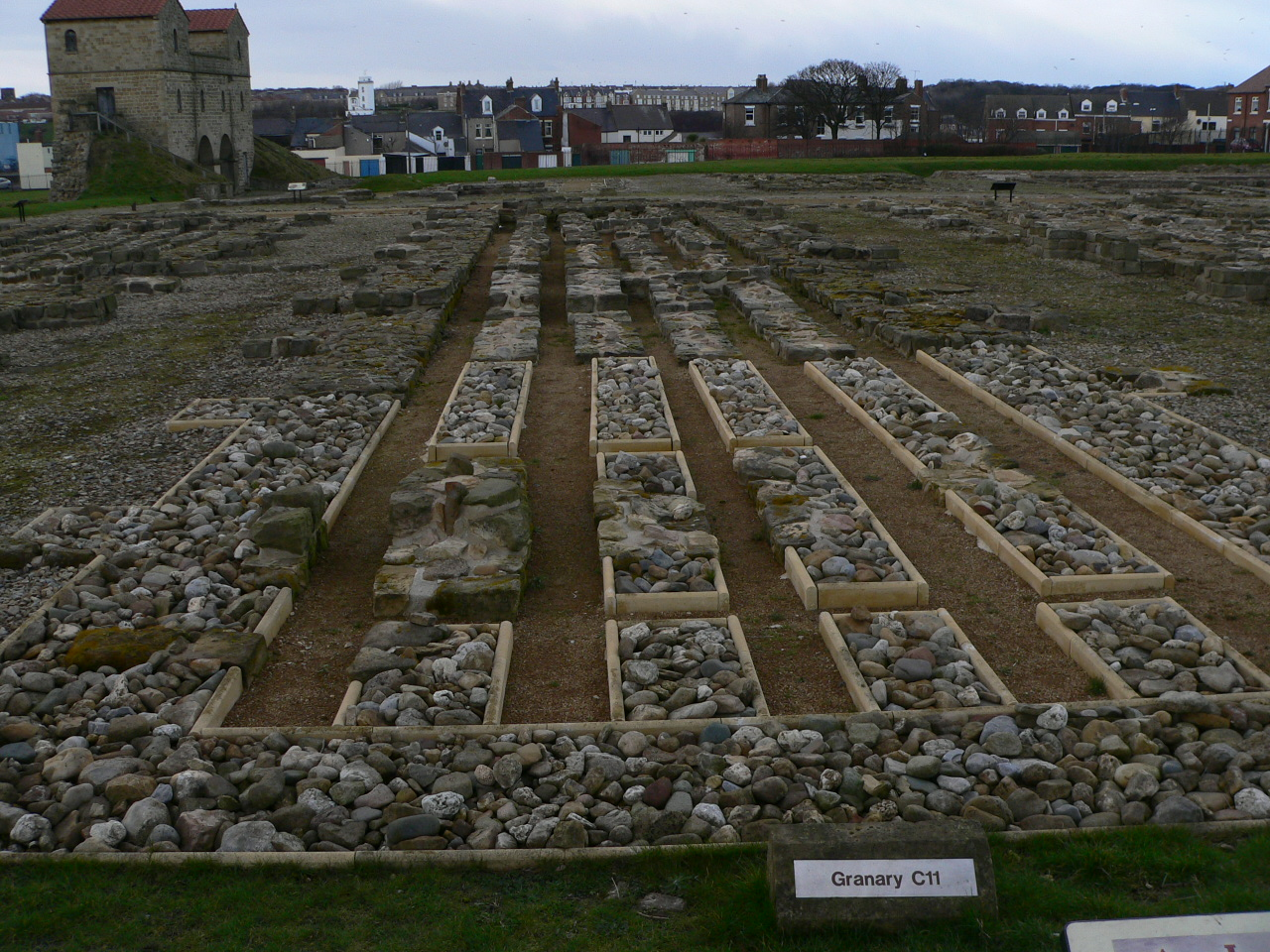
Not much remains of these horrea (granaries) at Arbeia (modern South Shields in north-east England), but the longitudinal supports for the floor can be seen.

==== Rear section (retentura) ====
The area between the via quintana and the rear wall (i.e. the wall containing the rear gateway), referred to as the retentura, also contained barracks, storage facilities, and workshops.

The part of the retentura ("stretching to the rear") closest to the principia contained the quaestorium. By the late empire it had developed also into a safekeep for plunder and a prison for hostages and high-ranking enemy captives. Near the quaestorium were the quarters of the headquarters guard (statores), who amounted to two centuries (centuriae, companies). If the imperator was present they served as his bodyguard.

=== Barracks ===
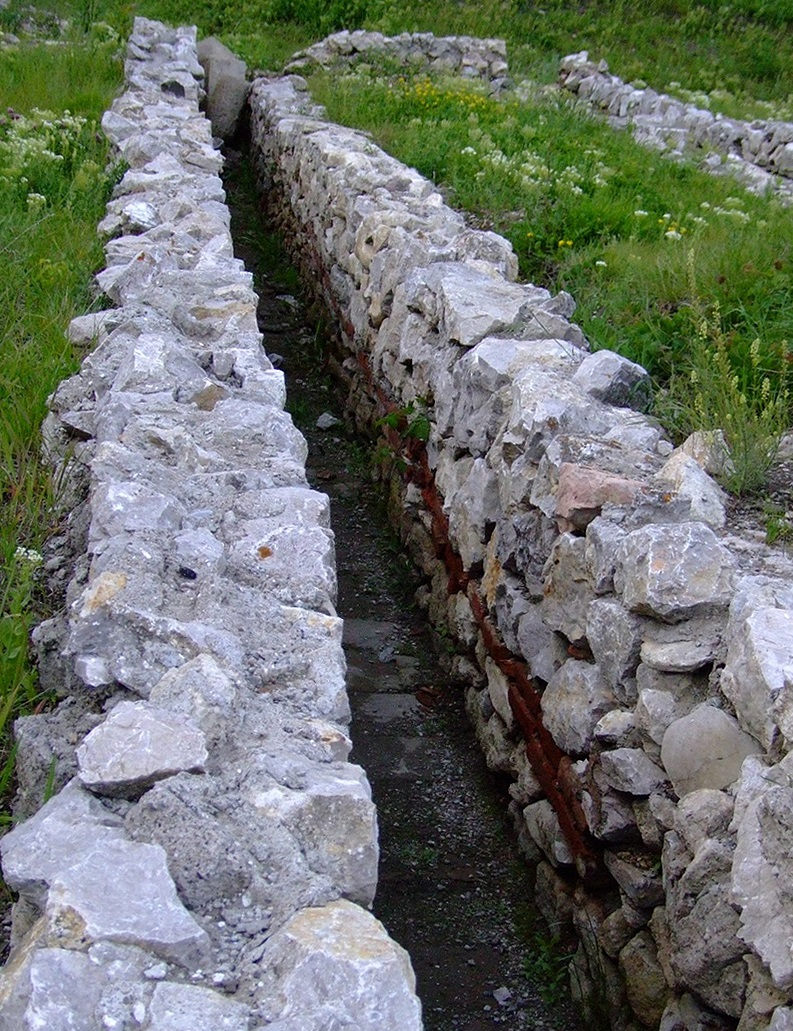
A sanitary channel at Potaissa, Dacia (modern Romania). It is placed cross-slope with a slight decline and then exits down-slope.

Further from the quaestorium were the accommodations of the nationes ("natives"), who were auxiliaries of foreign troops, and the legionaries in double rows of tents or barracks (strigae). One striga was as long as required and 18 m wide. In it were two hemistrigia of facing tents centered in its 9 m strip. Arms could be stacked before the tents and baggage carts kept there as well. Space on the other side of the tent was for passage. In the northern places like Britain, where it got cold in the winter, they would make wood or stone barracks. The Romans would also put a fireplace in the barracks. They had about three bunk beds in it. They had a small room beside it where they put their armour; it was as big as the tents. They would make these barracks if the fort they constructed was permanent.

Typically, the barracks were situated in the front and rear areas of the fortress. Each cohort comprised six barrack blocks, positioned in parallel alignment, frequently arranged in facing pairs. However, there is considerable variation in the precise numbers and types of buildings in a fortress, as well as variation in the design, size and proportions of barracks. The buildings were rectangular in plan, measuring 30-100 x 7-15m, and divided into contubernia (usually 10-13 in number). Each contubernium comprised a front and rear room (probably for storage and sleeping respectively). The majority of barracks were equipped with a covered walkway or verandah along the front elevation. Accommodation for centurions was provided in individual houses, constructed in close proximity to or attached to their barrack block. For the elite first cohort, accommodation was typically located in the latera praeticii area, often in barracks that were slightly larger than those of the other cohorts. Their centurions (the legion's most senior centurions, each in charge of a double-century) enjoyed more substantial and larger residences. The tribunes' houses were even larger and typically followed the design of the civilian peristyle, featuring a series of rooms around a central courtyard.

=== Sanitation ===
For sanitary facilities, a camp had both public and private latrines. A public latrine consisted of a bank of seats situated over a channel of running water. One of the major considerations for selecting the site of a camp was the presence of running water, which the engineers diverted into the sanitary channels. Drinking water came from wells; however, the larger and more permanent bases featured the aqueduct, a structure running a stream captured from high ground (sometimes miles away) into the camp. The praetorium had its own latrine and probably the quarters of the high-ranking officers. In or near the intervallum, where they could easily be accessed, were the latrines of the soldiers. A public bathhouse for the soldiers, also containing a latrine, was located near or on the via principalis.

=== Surroundings ===
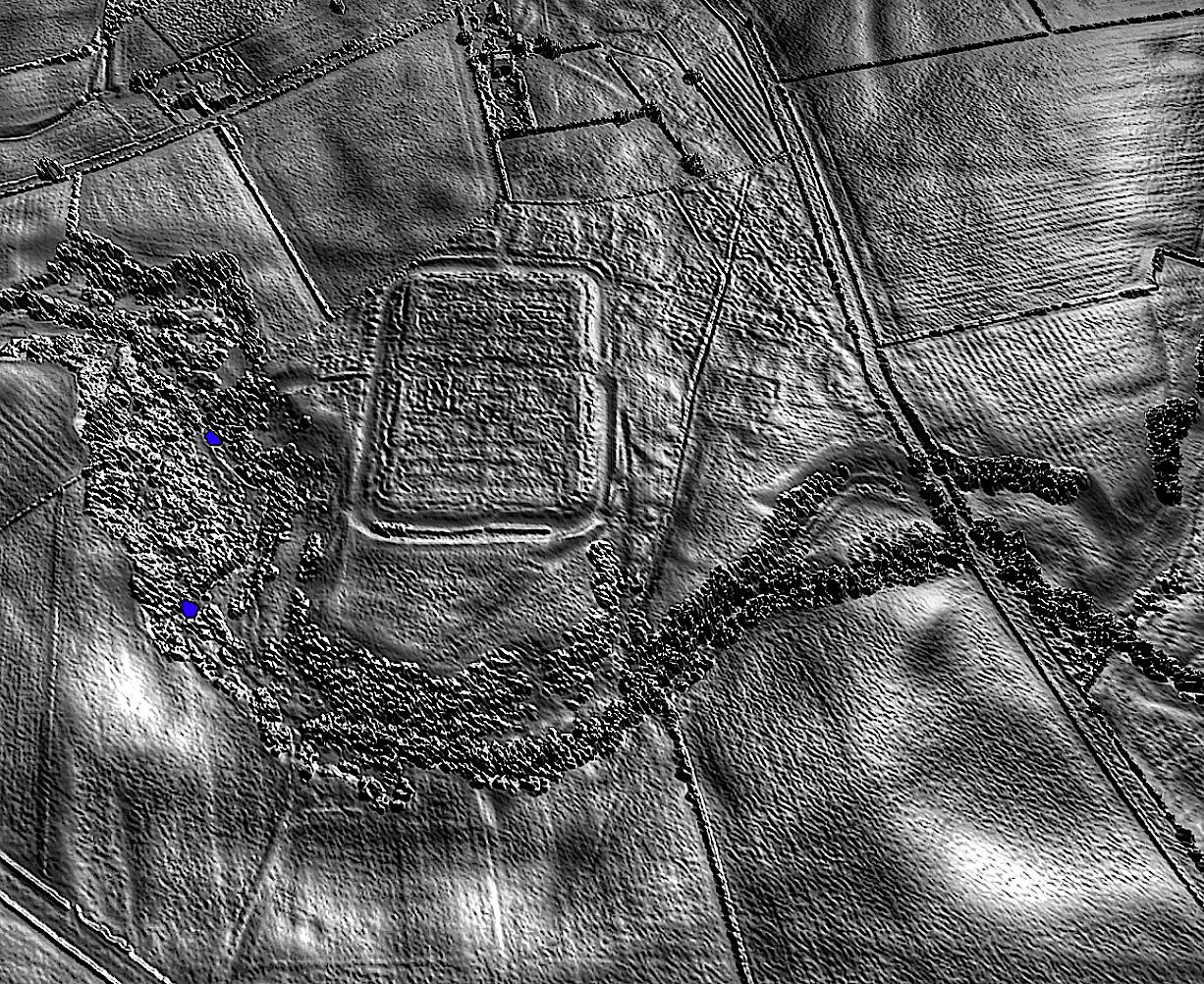
A lidar view of Olerica Roman fort and vicus in Cumbria. The fort is central and is surrounded by a ditch. The bent shape running in the foreground across the image is the Wiza Beck stream, and the A595 road runs from the bottom right to the top of the image.

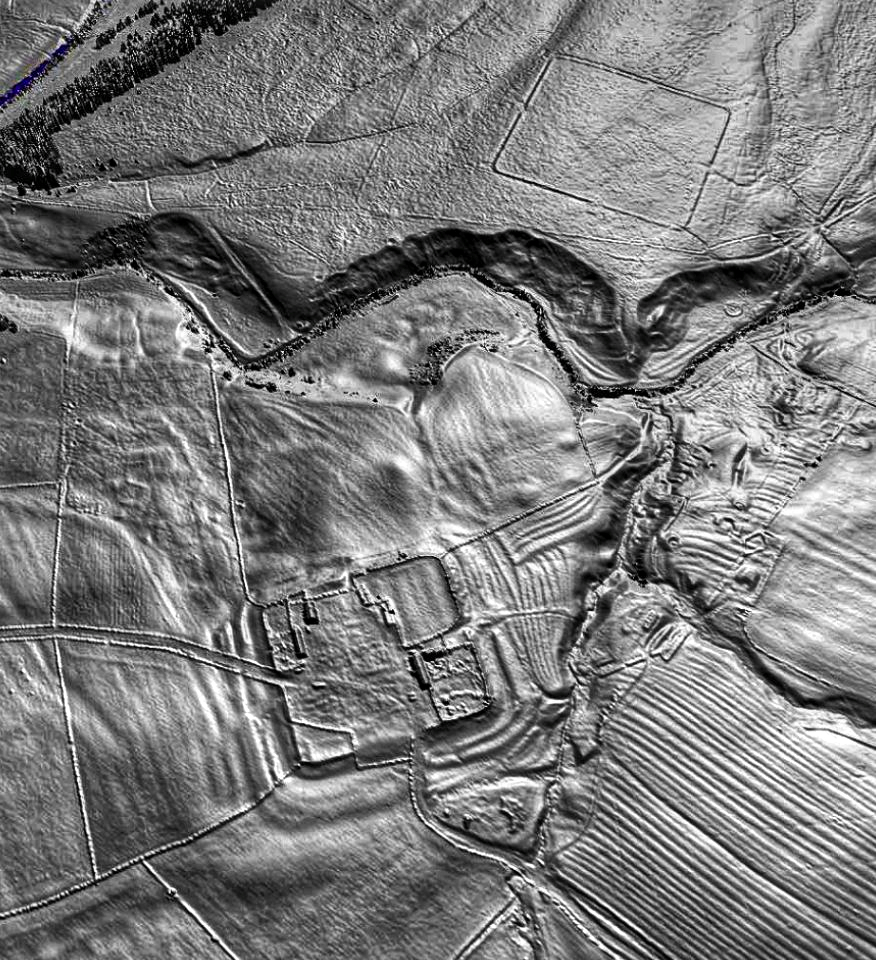
A lidar view of Bremenium Roman fort, vicus and Birdhope camps in Northumberland. A stream, the Sills Burn, runs horizontally across the image. The temporary marching camp is the fainter square in the upper half of the image, while the fort is the square shape in the lower half of the image.

Around the castra there were villages to support the needs of the military personnel stationed there. These villages, known as canabae for the legionary fortresses and vici for the auxiliary forts, were home to a variety of people, including merchants, craftsmen, families of soldiers, and other civilians who provided goods and services. The canabae and vici acted as vital hubs for trade and economic activity, supplying food, equipment, and other necessities to the soldiers. They also served as social and cultural centers, facilitating interactions between the Roman military and the local populations.

The villages were generally of three types. The first was the roadside village, where buildings lined the main arterial roads leading to and from the fortress. The second type, known as the tangential village, consisted of structures following a road that passed alongside the camp. The third type was the ring village, where buildings were arranged along a circular by-pass road that encircled the castra. The buildings in these villages were typically long and narrow, with a small frontage facing the street, often featuring a porticus (a covered walkway or porch). The houses were built on elongated plots, with the front sections serving as living quarters, taverns, kitchens, shops, or storage cellars. The rear portions of these properties were used for practical purposes, such as workshops, stables, wells, and latrines, making efficient use of the available space for both residential and commercial needs.

=== Modifications in practice ===
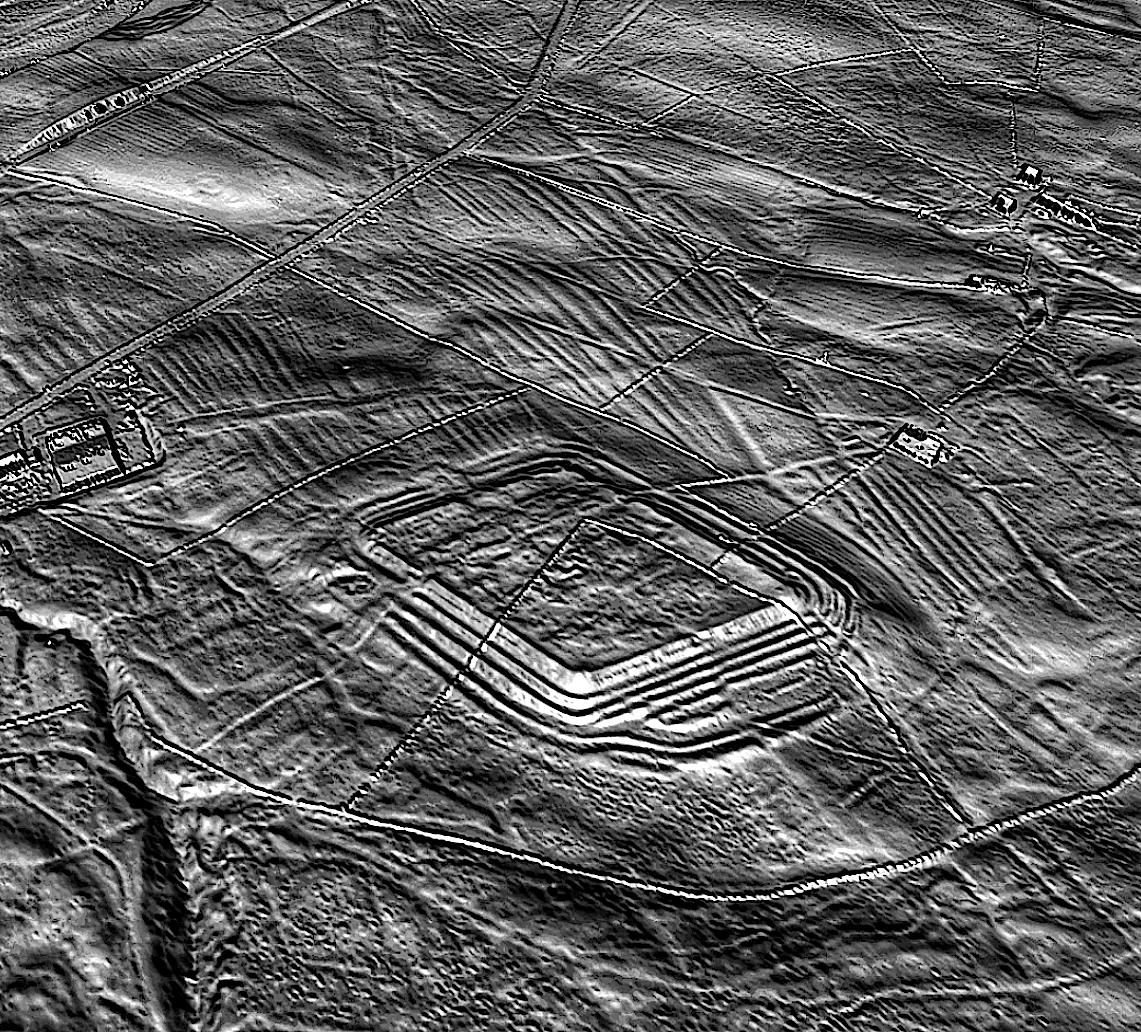
A lidar view of the lozenge-shaped Epiacum Roman fort in Northumberland, defended by multiple ramparts.

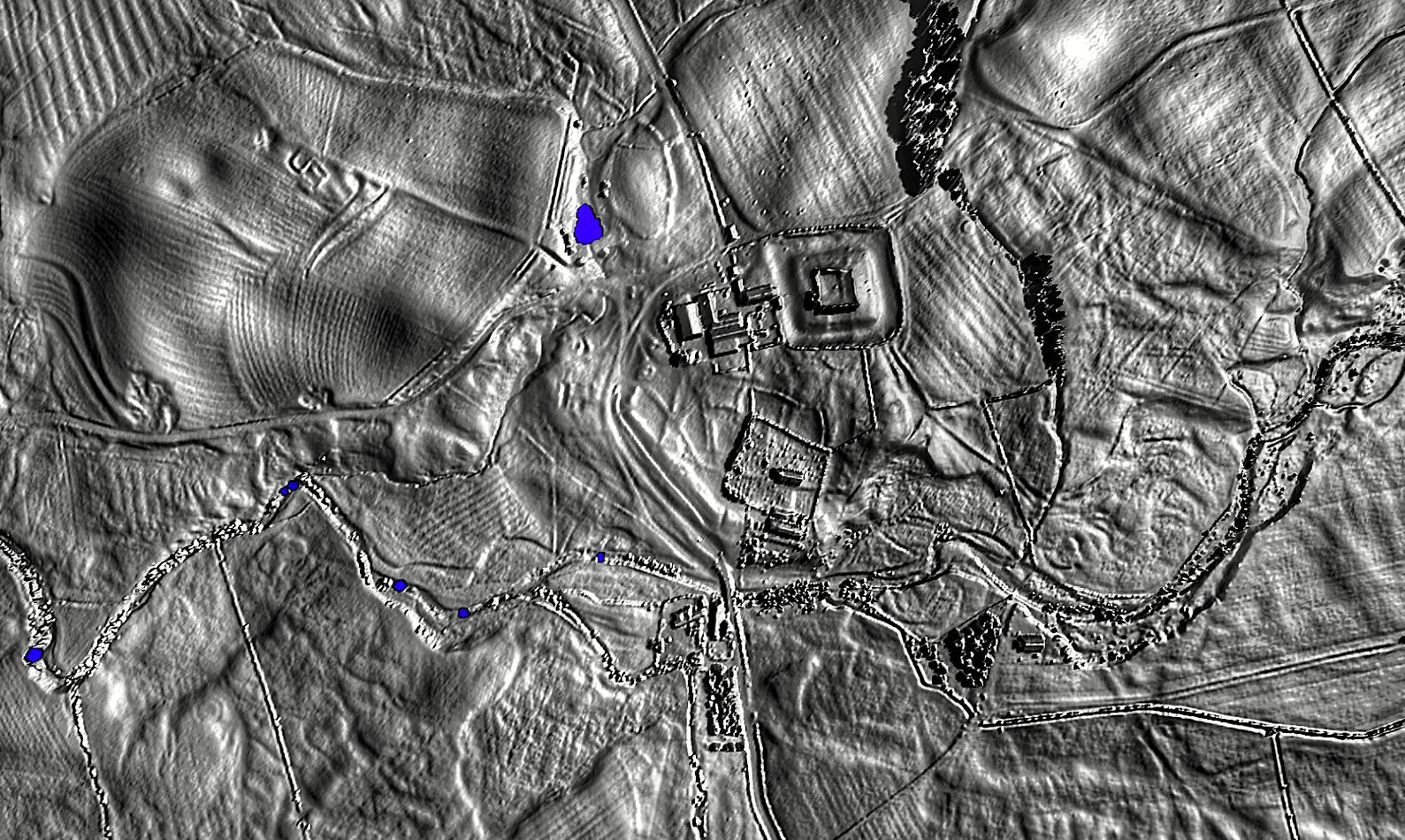
A lidar view of Bewcastle hexagonal Roman fort (top left), castle and deserted medieval village (DMV; in the centre) in Cumbria

The ideal plan was typically modified to suit the terrain and the circumstances. Each camp discovered by archaeology has its own specific layout and architectural features, which makes sense from a military point of view. If, for example, the camp was built on an outcrop, it followed the lines of the outcrop. The terrain for which it was best suited and for which it was probably designed in distant prehistoric times was the rolling plain.

The camp was best placed on the summit and along the side of a low hill, with spring water running in rivulets through the camp (aquatio) and pastureland to provide grazing (pabulatio) for the animals. In case of attack, arrows, javelins and sling missiles could be fired down at an enemy tiring himself to come up. For defence, troops could be formed in an acies, or "battle-line", outside the gates where they could be easily resupplied and replenished as well as being supported by archery from the palisade.

The streets, gates and buildings present depended on the requirements and resources of the camp. The gates might vary from two to six and not be centred on the sides. Not all the standard streets and buildings might be present.

== Camp life ==
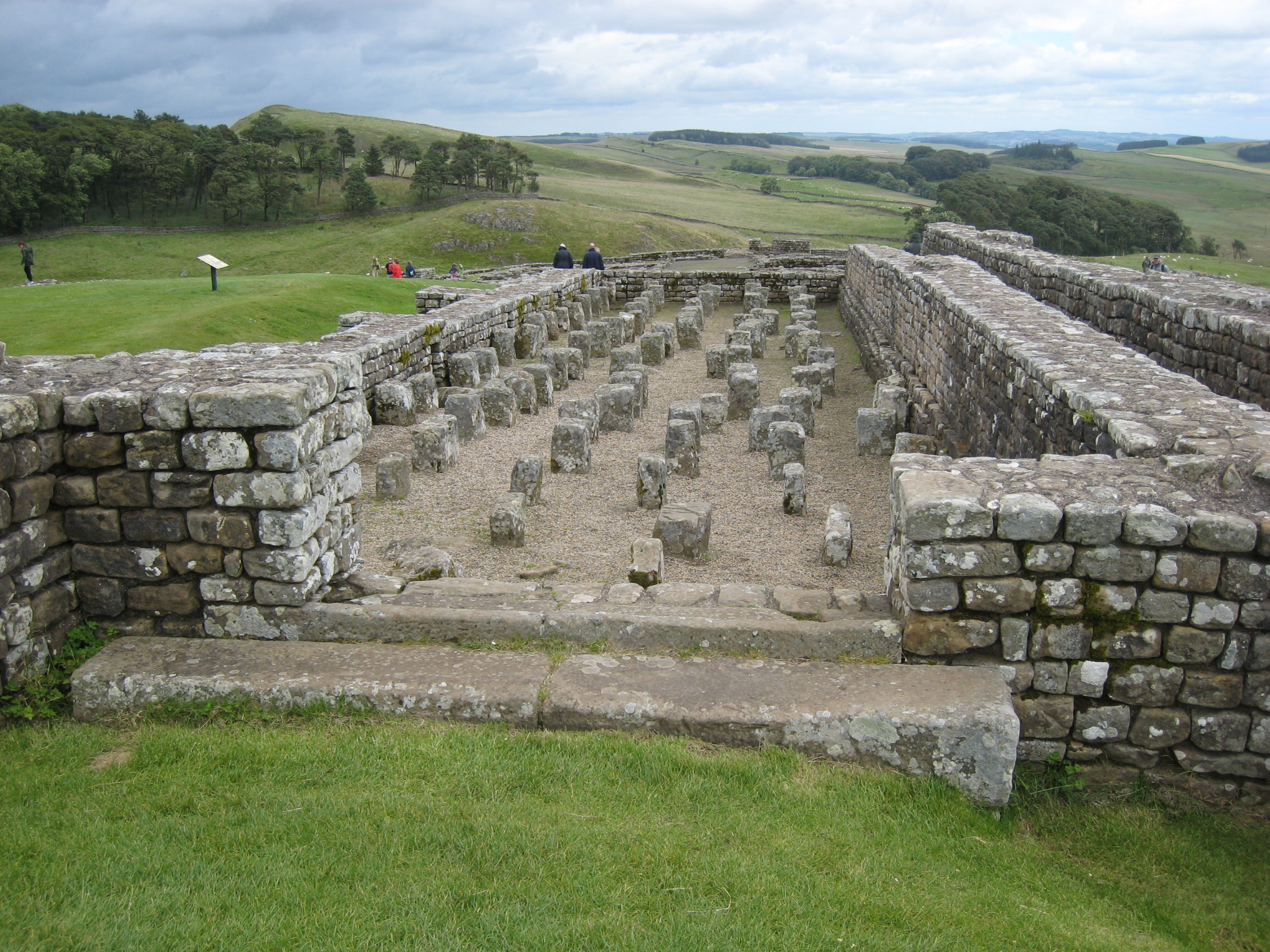
The pillars supported a raised floor to keep food dry and free from vermin in the northern granary at Housesteads Roman Fort (Vercovicium) on Hadrian's Wall.

At dawn, the day started with the sound of the buccina signaling the soldiers to rise. They quickly dressed in their tunics and armor, as punctuality was crucial. The morning assembly followed, where the centurion inspected the soldiers, ensuring their weapons and armor were in pristine condition. Orders for the day were issued during this time, and discipline was strictly enforced. After assembly, the soldiers often participated in physical training. This included marches, combat drills with wooden weapons, and strength exercises to keep them battle-ready. Depending on their location and the state of the fortress, soldiers might also train in archery, javelin throwing, or constructing siege equipment. These sessions were not only essential for maintaining fitness but also for instilling discipline and teamwork. When not training, soldiers were assigned various tasks within the fortress. These could include repairing fortifications, maintaining roads, or sharpening weapons. They also took turns on guard duty, patrolling the walls and gates of the fortress to ensure its security.

Around midday, the soldiers broke for their lunch, (prandium). This meal typically consisted of bread, porridge, cheese, vegetables, and occasionally meat if supplies allowed. After their meal, the soldiers returned to their duties. Some assisted in administrative tasks such as record-keeping, inventorying supplies, or writing reports. Others worked on construction projects, such as building or repairing barracks, stables, or roads leading to the fortress. Skilled craftsmen among the soldiers might be tasked with forging weapons, making armor, or creating tools.The afternoon often included more training or preparations for future campaigns. Soldiers practiced formations, honed their fighting techniques, and rehearsed strategies under the watchful eyes of their centurions.

As evening approached, the fortress became quieter. Soldiers rotated through their shifts for guard duty, with some standing watch while others rested. The dinner, (cena), was larger and more substantial than the midday meal. After dinner, the soldiers had some personal time (otium). They might write letters to their families, repair their equipment, or engage in games like dice or board games. Storytelling and singing were popular activities, helping to keep morale high. Some soldiers used this time for religious practices, offering sacrifices or prayers to their gods. Before retiring for the night, the watch schedule was finalized, and the gates of the fortress were secured. Soldiers on night guard patrolled the walls, ensuring the safety of the camp throughout the night. Others rested in their barracks, sleeping on simple wooden beds with straw mattresses, ready to begin the routine again at dawn.

== See also ==
- List of castra by province
- Military history of ancient Rome
- Outline of ancient Rome

== Bibliography ==
- Adkins, Lesley; Adkins, Roy (2004). Handbook To Life In Ancient Rome. New York: Facts On File. ISBN 0-8160-5026-0.
- Bishop, M.C. (2012). Handbook to Roman Legionary Fortresses. Barnsley: Pen and Sword. ISBN 978-1-84884-138-3.
- Campbell, Duncan B. (2010). "Women in Roman forts: Residents, visitors or barred from entry?". Ancient Warfare. Vol. IV, no. 6.
- Davies, Roy (1989). Service in the Roman Army. Endinburgh: Edinburgh University Press. ISBN 0852244959.
- Goldsworthy, Adrian (2007). The Complete Roman Army. London: Thames & Hudson. ISBN 978-0-500-05124-5.
- Hanel, Norbert (2011). "Military Camps, Canabae, and Vici. The Archeological Evidence". In Paul Erdkamp (ed.). A Companion to the Roman Army. Chichester, West Sussex: Wiley-Blackwell. pp. 395–416. ISBN 978-1-4051-2153-8. For author see Norbert Hanel.
- Hanson, W.S.; Friel, J.G.P. (1996). "Westerton: A Roman watchtower on the Gask frontier". Proceedings of the Society of Antiquaries of Scotland. 125: 499–519. doi:10.9750/PSAS.125.499.519.
- Johnson, Anne (1983). Roman Forts of the 1st and 2nd centuries AD in Britain and the German Provinces. London: Adam & Charles Black. ISBN 0-7136-2223-7.
- Josephus. The War of the Jews . Translated by William Whiston – via Wikisource.
- Pokorny, Julius (1959). Indogermanisches Etymologisches Wörterbuch [Indo-European Etymological Dictionary] (in German). Vol. 2. Bern: Francke.
- Richardson, Alan (2001). "The order of battle in the Roman army: Evidence from marching camps". Oxford Journal of Archaeology. 20 (2). doi:10.1111/1468-0092.00129.
- Richardson, Alan (2002). "Camps and forts of units and formations of the Roman army". Oxford Journal of Archaeology. 21 (1). doi:10.1111/1468-0092.00151.
- Richardson, Alan (2003). "Space and Manpower in Roman Camps". Oxford Journal of Archaeology. 22 (3). doi:10.1111/1468-0092.00189.
- Scheidel, Walter (November 2005). "Marriage, Families and Survival in the Roman Imperial Army: Demographic Aspects" (PDF). Princeton/Stanford Working Papers in Classics. Princeton University.
- Shirley, Elizabeth (2001). Building a Roman legionary fortress. Stroud: Tempus. ISBN 0752419110.
- Sims, Lesley (2004). Roman Soldier's Handbook. London: Usborne Publishing. ISBN 1474903347.
- Steinhoff, John Paul (2019). "Theoretical Approaches to Roman Camp and Fort Design: An Examination of the Frontiers in Britain and North Africa under Hadrian". Vancouver: University of British Columbia Press.
- Vegetius, Flavius (2013). Renatus Epitoma Rei Militaris [Epitome of Military Science]. Liverpool: Liverpool University Press. ISBN 978-0853239109.
- Verboven, Koenraad; et al. (The Impact of the Roman Army (200 BC–AD 476): Economic, Social, Political, Religious and Cultural Aspects) (2007). Lukas De Blois; Elio Lo Cascio (eds.). Good for Business: The Roman Army and the Emergence of a 'Business Class' in the Northwestern Provinces of the Roman Empire (1st century BCE–3rd century CE). Leiden, Netherlands: Brill. ISBN 978-90-04-16044-6.
