= Siculus Flaccus =

Siculus Flaccus (date uncertain) was an ancient Roman gromaticus (land surveyor), and writer in Latin on land surveying. His work was included in a collection of gromatic treatises in the 6th century AD.

Siculus Flaccus made the distinction between public roads (viae publicae), local roads (viae vicinales) and private or estate roads (viae privatae) in Roman Italy.

== See also ==
- Roman roads
