= Gromatici =

Ancient Roman land surveyors

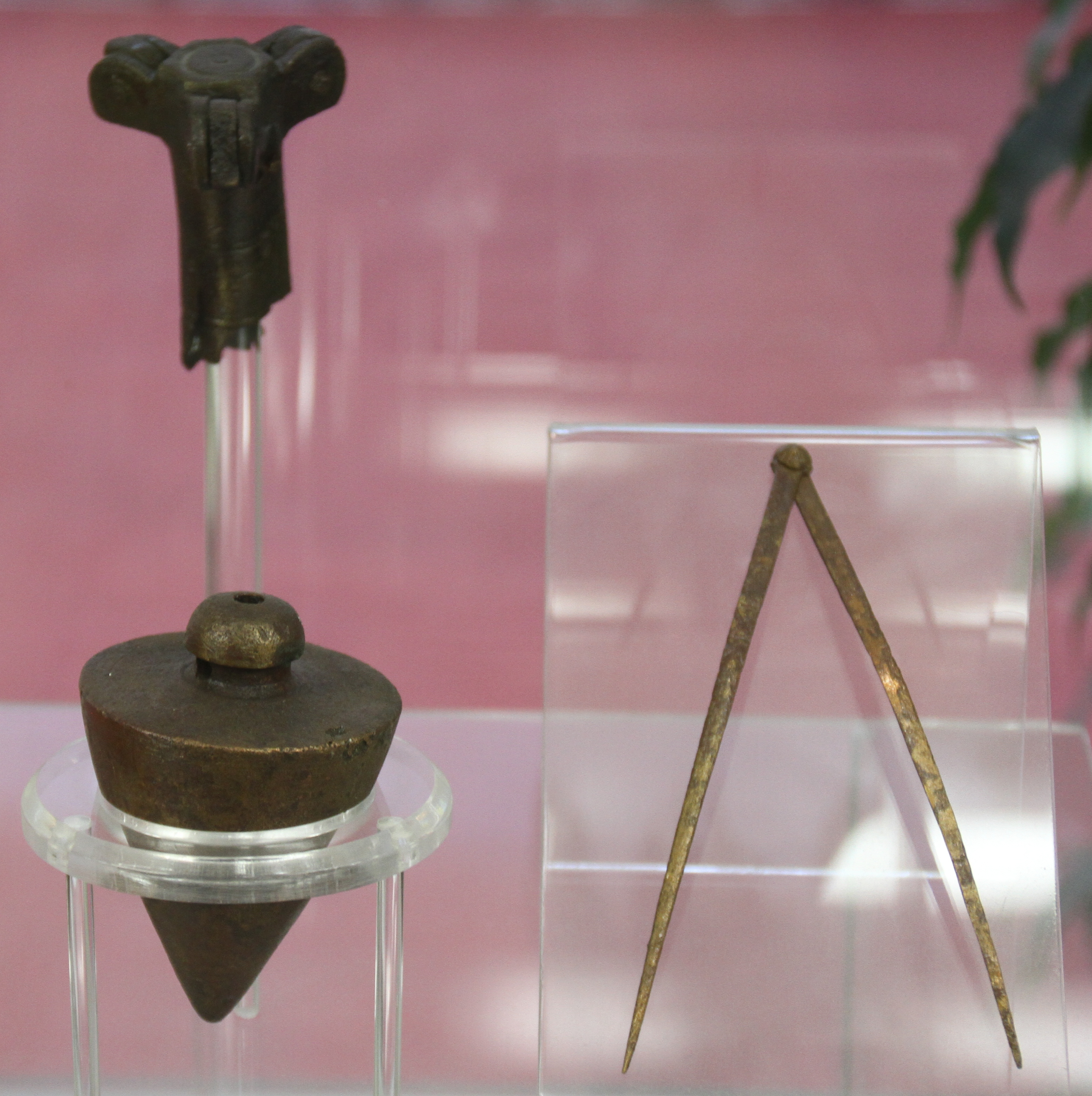
Equipment used by an ancient Roman land surveyor (gromaticus), found at the site of Aquincum, modern Budapest, Hungary

Gromatici (from Latin groma or gruma, a surveyor's pole) or agrimensores was the name for land surveyors amongst the ancient Romans. The "gromatic writers" were technical writers who codified their techniques of surveying, most of whose preserved writings are found in the Corpus Agrimensorum Romanorum.

== History ==
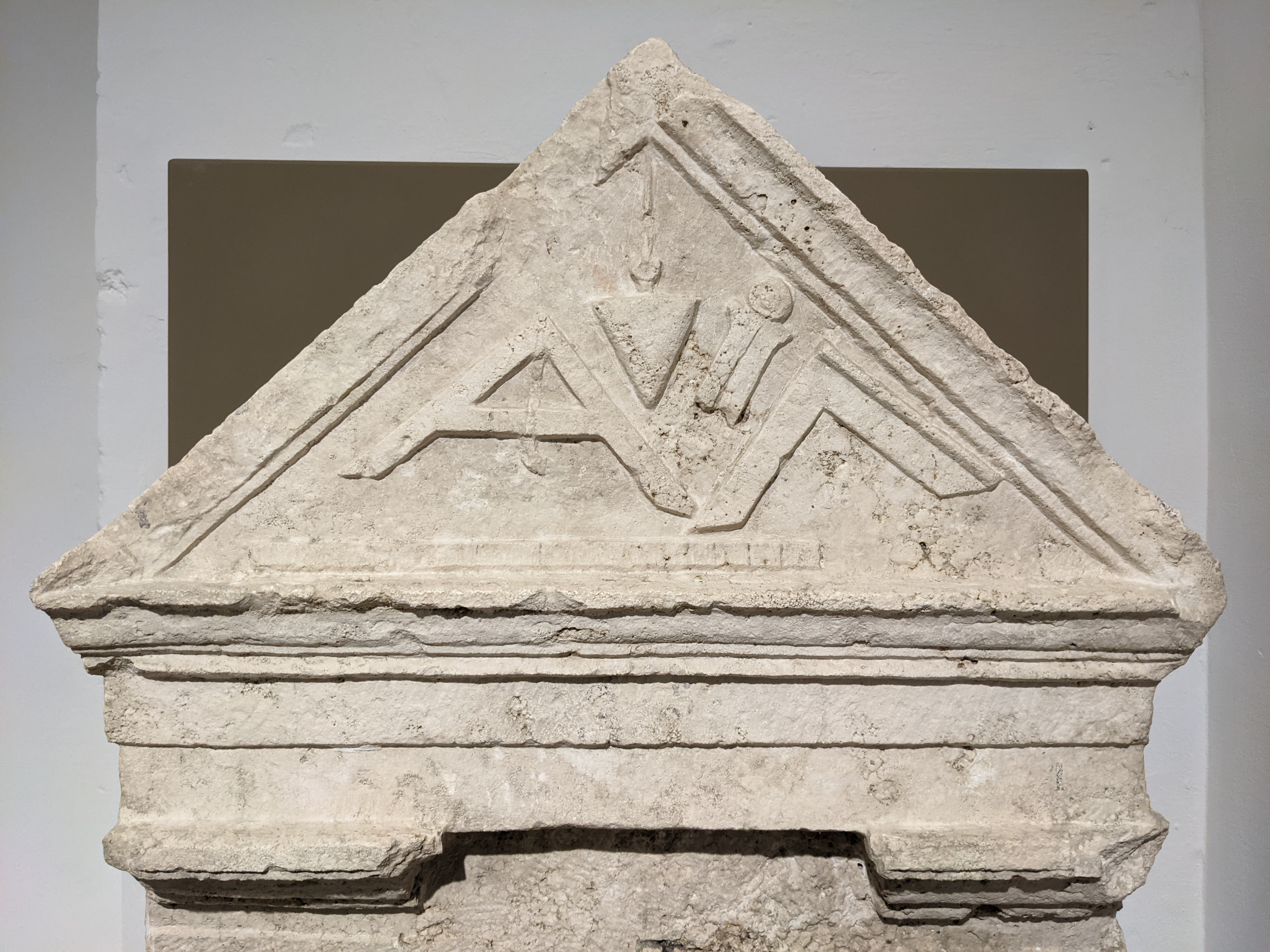
CIL VI 10588, Ancient Roman measuring instruments

=== Roman Republic ===
At the foundation of a colony and the assignation of lands the auspices were taken, for which purpose the presence of the augur was necessary. But the business of the augur did not extend beyond the religious part of the ceremony: the division and measurement of the land were made by professional measurers. These were the finitores mentioned by the early writers, who in the later periods were called mensores and agrimensores. The business of a finitor could only be done by a free man, and the honourable nature of his office is indicated by the rule that there was no bargain for his services, but he received his pay in the form of a gift. These finitores appear also to have acted as judices, under the name of arbitri (single arbiter), in those disputes about boundaries which were purely of a technical, not a legal, character. The first professional surveyor mentioned is Lucius Decidius Saxa, who was employed by Mark Antony in the measurement of camps.

=== Roman Empire ===
Under the empire the observance of the auspices in the fixing of camps and the establishment of military colonies was less regarded, and the practice of the agrimensores was greatly increased. The distribution of land amongst the veterans, the increase in the number of military colonies, the settlement of Italian peasants in the provinces, the general survey of the empire under Augustus, the separation of private and state domains, led to the establishment of a recognized professional corporation of surveyors. The practice was also codified as a system by technical writers such as Julius Frontinus, Hyginus, Siculus Flaccus, and other Gromatic writers, as they are sometimes termed. The teachers of geometry in the large cities of the empire used to give practical instruction on the system of gromatics. This practical geometry was one of the liberalia studia; but the professors of geometry and the teachers of law were not exempted from the obligation of being tutores, and from other such burdens, a fact which shows the subordinate rank which the teachers of elementary science then held.

The agrimensor could mark out the limits of the centuriae, and restore the boundaries where they were confused, but he could not assign without a commission from the emperor. Military persons of various classes are also sometimes mentioned as practising surveying, and settling disputes about boundaries. The lower rank of the professional agrimensor, as contrasted with the finitor of earlier periods, is shown by the fact that in the imperial period there might be a contract with an agrimensor for paying him for his services.

=== Late empire ===
The agrimensor of the later period was merely employed in disputes as to the boundaries of properties. The foundation of colonies and the assignation of lands were now less common, though we read of colonies being established to a late period of the empire, and the boundaries of the lands must have been set out in due form. Those who marked out the ground in camps for the soldiers' tents are also called mensores, but they were military men. The functions of the agrimensor are shown by a passage of Hyginus, in all questions as to determining boundaries by means of the marks (signa), the area of surfaces, and explaining maps and plans, the services of the agrimensor were required: in all questions that concerned property, right of road, enjoyment of water, and other easements (servitutes) they were not required, for these were purely legal questions. Generally, therefore, they were either employed by the parties themselves to settle boundaries, or they received their instructions for that purpose from a judex. In this capacity they were advocati. But they also acted as judices, and could give a final decision in that class of smaller questions which concerned the quinque pedes of the Lex Mamilia (the law setting which boundary spaces were not subject to usucapio), as appears from Frontinus.

Under the Christian emperors the name mensores was changed into agrimensores to distinguish them from another class of mensores, who are mentioned in the codes of Theodosius I and Justinian I. By a rescript of Constantine I and Constans (344 AD) the teachers and learners of geometry received immunity from civil burdens. According to a constitution of Theodosius II and Valentinian III (440 AD), they received jurisdiction in questions of alluvio; but some writers disagree that this crucial passage is genuine. According to another constitution of the same emperors, the agrimensor was to receive an aureus from each of any three bordering proprietors whose boundaries he settled, and if he set a limes right between proprietors, he received an aureus for each twelfth part of the property through which fee restored the limes. Further, by another constitution of the same emperors, the young agrimensores were to be called "clarissimi" while they were students, and when they began to practise their profession, "spectabiles".

== Writers and works ==
The earliest of the gromatic writers was Frontinus, whose De agrorum qualitate, dealing with the legal aspect of the art, was the subject of a commentary by Aggenus Urbicus, a Christian schoolmaster. Under Trajan a certain Balbus, who had accompanied the emperor on his Dacian campaign, wrote a still extant manual of geometry for land surveyors (Expositio et ratio omnium formarum or mensurarum, probably after a Greek original by Hero), dedicated to a certain Celsus who had invented an improvement in a gromatic instrument (perhaps the dioptra, resembling the modern theodolite); for the treatises of Hyginus see that name.

Somewhat later than Trajan was Siculus Flaccus (De condicionibus agrorum, extant), while the most curious treatise on the subject, written in barbarous Latin and entitled Casae litterarum (long a school textbook) is the work of a certain Innocentius (4th-5th century). It is doubtful whether Boetius is the author of the treatises attributed to him. The Gromatici veteres also contains extracts from official registers (probably belonging to the 5th century) of colonial and other land surveys, lists and descriptions of boundary stones, and extracts from the Theodosian Codex.

According to Mommsen, the collection had its origin during the 5th century in the office of a vicarius (diocesan governor) of Rome, who had a number of surveyors under him. The surveyors were known by various names: decempedator (with reference to the instrument used); finitor, metator or mensor castrorum in republican times; togati Augustorum as imperial civil officials; professor, auctor as professional instructors.

The best edition of the Gromatici is by Karl Lachmann and others (1848) with supplementary volume, Die Schriften der römischen Feldmesser (1852). The 1913 edition of Carl Olof Thulin contains only a few works. The 2000 edition of Brian Campbell is much broader and also contains an English translation.

== See also ==
- Bematist
- Triangulation (surveying)#History
