= Mary Belle McElwain =

American classical scholar

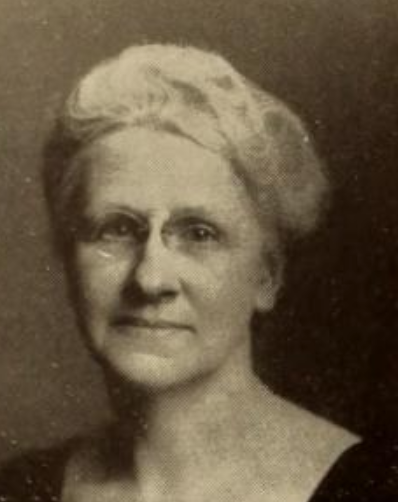
- Mary Belle McElwain, from the 1925 Smith College yearbook
- Born: 14 May 1874; Chambersburg, Pennsylvania, United States
- Died: 23 February 1964 (aged 89); Gettysburg, Pennsylvania, United States

Academic background
- Education: Cornell University
- Thesis: "The use of the imperative in Plautus" (1910)

Academic work
- Discipline: Classics
- Sub-discipline: Greek and Latin language
- Institutions: Wilson College; Smith College

Mary Belle McElwain (14 May 1874 – 23 February 1964) was an American classical scholar.

== Biography ==
McElwain gained her BA from Wilson College in 1895. She subsequently taught Greek, English, and maths at the college until 1903. After teaching at a finishing school ('Miss Wright's School') at Bryn Mawr until 1908 McElwain gained a MA from Cornell University in 1909 with a thesis titled "The Life of the Empress Livia Based on Latin and Greek Sources" and her PhD in 1910 on "The use of the imperative in Plautus". In 1936 she was awarded an honorary Litt. D. from Wilson College.

From 1910 until her retirement in 1942, McElwain taught Latin and Greek at Smith College. She served as class dean three times and was made Professor Emeritus of Classical Languages and Literature.

She returned to Wilson College after retirement and worked as the acting dean until 1946 and as the college historian. She had previously served on the board of trustees of Wilson College from 1929 to 1932 and 1938–56.

McElwain was a member of Phi Beta Kappa, American Academy in Rome, American Philological Association, and the American Association of University Women.

McElwain is buried at Cedar Grove Cemetery in Chambersburg. A hall of residence at Wilson College is named after her.

== Select publications ==
- McElwain, M. B. (ed) 1975. Stratagems. Aqueducts of Rome (Loeb Classical Library 174)
- McElwain, M. B. 1939. "Further Reflections on the Forgotten Student", The Classical Journal 34 (4), pp. 198–212
- McElwain, M. B. 1922. "In Memoriam: Charles Edwin Bennett, 1858-1921", The Classical Journal 18 (1), pp. 23–25.
