= Aggenus Urbicus =

Aggenus Urbicus (also Agennius Urbicus) was an ancient Roman technical writer appearing in the Corpus Agrimensorum Romanorum, a collection of works on land surveying from Late Antiquity. It is uncertain when he lived, but he may have been a Christian living in the later part of the 4th century, judging by expressions he uses.

Only two, fragmentary works are preserved in the Corpus Agrimensorum Romanorum under his name:

- De controversiis agrorum ("On Land Disputes")
- Commentum de agrorum qualitate ("Commentary on Land Quality"), a commentary on the work of this name by Frontinus.
- The Liber Diazographus ("Multi-coloured Painter Book") attached to the Commentum is sometimes counted as a third work.

== Name ==
The correct form of the author's name is uncertain. In the oldest surviving manuscript of both works, the 6th- or 7th-century Codex Arcerianus, the name appears as AGGENVS or AGENVS VRBICVS. The form used most often in scholarship, Agennius Urbicus, derives from the 9th or 10th century Bamberg manuscript.

Two inscriptions from the 1st century AD mention one M. Adginnius Urbicus. However a connection between this individual and the author of the works in the Corpus Agrimensorum Romanorum is not possible; word choice and syntax patterns in the works show that they were written in the 5th century AD or later.

== Works ==
=== On Land Disputes ===
The version of De controversiis agrorum available to modern readers derives from the 1913 edition of Carl Olof Thulin, who based his edition in turn on the edition of Karl Lachmann, published between 1848 and 1853. Both editors used the oldest manuscript, the Codex Arcerianus ("Manuscript B"), which is considered the first class manuscript, alongside two second class manuscripts, the Codex Palatinus Vaticanus Latinus 1564 ("Manuscript P") and the Codex Guelferbytanus Gudianus Latinus 105 ("Manuscript G"). In both editions, the order of passages is significantly altered from that of the manuscripts, since the manuscripts themselves probably derive from a series of texts with errors in them. Moreover, Karl Lachmann starts from the assumption that Agennius Urbicus based the majority of the text on the work of Frontinus and attempted to reconstruct his second book on land surveying on that basis. Thulin also sees the work as deriving from that of Frontinus. The differences between the older work and Agennius Urbicus' version are indicated in the edition by the use of small italic type and larger regular type.

=== Commentary on Land Quality ===
The second work transmitted under Agennius' name, the Commentum de agrorum qualitate, was probably not actually written by the same author as De controversiis. The work is (as its title indicates), a commentary on Frontinus' De agrorum qualitate (On Land Quality), explaining consecutive passages from this work (sometimes with explicit citations), and also dealing with the work De Limitibus (On Boundaries) by one Hyginus. Word choice and syntax indicate that the Commentum is a Late Antique work, probably of the 5th century. This makes it roughly contemporary with the first compilation and reworking of the Agrimensor texts, which led to the creation of the Corpus Agrimensorum Romanorum. The commentator declares his goal to be the explanation of older texts that were considered difficult: "We have undertaken to deal with the characteristics of fields and to explain them in plain and simple language, and we hope that what has been composed by the ancients in obscure language may be laid out more openly and comprehensibly for the childlike intellect of modern times." It is unclear whether this formulation means that the commentary was a book for experts or for use in training. Attached to the Commentum is a volume with text illustrated with geometric diagrams, known as the Liber diazographus ("Multi-coloured Painter Book"), which is sometimes counted as a separate work.

=== Assessement ===
Lachmann formed a negative judgement of Agennius' accomplishment in both works. In particular, he declared the Commentum to be "the wretched work of some Christian schoolmaster" and charged that "his unfortunate name has handed down confusion." However, it is uncertain how far the issues with the works ascribed to Agennius are due to subsequent transmission errors and interpolations.

== Bibliography ==
- Friedrich Blume, Karl Lachmann, Adolf Friedrich Rudorff (ed.): Gromatici veteres. Die Schriften der römischen Feldmesser. 2 Volumes, Georg Reimer, Berlin 1848–1852 (Digitised: Vol. 1, Vol. 2).
- Nicolaus Bubnov: Gerberti postea Silvestri II papae Opera mathematica (972–1003). Berlin 1899 (Nachdruck Hildesheim 2005), especially Appendix VII on manuscripts.
- Carl Olaf Thulin: Corpus agrimensorum Romanorum (= Opuscula agrimensorum veterum. Band I). B. G. Teubner, Leipzig 1913 (Digitalisat).
- James N. Carder: Art historical problems of a Roman land surveying manuscript: The codex Arcerianus A, Wolfenbüttel. Dissertation, University of Pittsburgh 1976.
- Brian Campbell: The writings of the Roman land surveyors. Introduction, translation and commentary (= Journal of the Roman Studies Monographs. Vol. 9). Society for the Promotion of Roman Studies, London 2000, ISBN 0-907764-28-2.
- Okko Behrends, Monique Clavel-Lévêque et al.: Agennius Urbicus. Controverses sur les terres (= Corpus agrimensorum Romanorum. Vol. VI). Office des publications officielles des Communautés européennes, Luxembourg 2005.
