= Amanda Cockrell =

American novelist

Amanda Cockrell is an American author and academic at Hollins University, a private women's university in Virginia, United States. She has written historical novels under the pseudonym Damion Hunter.

== Academic career ==
Amanda Cockrell co-founded the children's literature graduate program at Hollins University in 1992, along with R.H.W. Dillard, and was director of the program until she retired from it. Since then, she has been managing editor of The Hollins Critic, a position she holds as of 2024.

== Writing career ==
Cockrell is the author of a number of historical novels for adults, some written under her own name and some under the pseudonym Damion Hunter. She has written novels about the Romans and about the indigenous peoples of the Americas. In 1981, she published The Centurions, the first book in a historical fiction series about the 1st-century Roman Empire. Set primarily in Roman Britain circa AD 72–75, it follows the adventures of a pair of Roman brothers – one free-born and one slave-born – as they serve in the Roman legions. The other three books in the series are Barbarian Princess, The Emperor's Games, and The Border Wolves. The three first books were written back in the 1980s, while the last novel in the series was published in 2021 finally wrapping up the story.

Her first young adult novel, What We Keep Is Not Always What Will Stay (2011), was named one of the best children's books of the year by The Boston Globe.

== Selected bibliography ==
=== As Amanda Cockrell ===
- Legions of the Mist, 1979
- Pomegranate Seed, 2002
- What We Keep Is Not Always What Will Stay, 2011

The Deer Dancers

- Daughter of the Sky, 1995
- Wind Caller's Children, 1996
- The Long Walk, 1996

The Horse Catchers

- When the Horses Came, 1999
- Children of the Horse, 2000
- The Rain Child, 2001

=== As Amanda Cockrell "writing as Damion Hunter" ===
- The Wall at the Edge of the World, 2020

(sequel to Legions of the Mist)

- The Border Wolves, 2021

(fourth book in The Centurions series)

=== As Damion Hunter ===
The Centurions Trilogy

- The Centurions, 1981
- Barbarian Princess, 1982
- The Emperor's Games, 1984
