= Ode to a Banker =

2000 novel by Lindsey Davis

- First edition
- Author: Lindsey Davis
- Language: English
- Series: Marcus Didius Falco
- Genre: Historical mystery crime novel
- Publisher: Century
- Publication date: 2000
- Publication place: United Kingdom
- Media type: Print (hardback and paperback)
- Pages: 305 pp
- ISBN: 0-71-268034-9
- OCLC: 267166181
- Preceded by: One Virgin Too Many
- Followed by: A Body in the Bath House

Ode to a Banker is a 2000 historical mystery crime novel by Lindsey Davis and the 12th book of the Marcus Didius Falco Mysteries series. Set in Rome between July and August AD 74, the novel stars Marcus Didius Falco, informer and imperial agent. The title refers to both the poetry that leads Falco to the Chrysippus scriptorum and to the bank that is the Chrysippus family's other business.

== Plot summary ==
When Marcus Didius Falco gives a poetry reading for family and friends, things get a little out of hand. The event is taken over by Aurelius Chrysippus, a wealthy Greek banker and patron to a group of struggling writers, who subsequently offers to publish Falco's work, which Falco turns down as being a raw deal. Unfortunately, soon afterwards Chrysippus is brutally murdered, with part of a broken scroll jammed up his nose, and due to his presence at Chrysippus' scriptorium Falco is implicated in his death and forced by his friend Petronius Longus, the enquiry chief of the vigiles, to investigate.

The result is a trawl through the literary and financial worlds of Ancient Rome, as Falco delves deep into Chrysippus' personal life and business history. Falco's investigations reveal that the deceased Chrysippus (Greek: "Golden Horse") was owner of the Golden Horse Bank, and many potential suspects are turned up, including disgruntled writers employed by Chrysippus’ scriptorium, a shipper Pisarchus who has fallen on hard times, as well as his family: Chrisyppus' widow Vibia, his ex-wife Lysa and his son Diomedes. Meanwhile, things get worse: one of the suspected writers, Avienus, is found dead and Falco and his friend Petronius are also attacked, although they manage to survive and kill the assassin. To add insult to injury, Falco also faces problems with his own family: his estranged father Geminius has problems coping with the death of his mistress, Flora, and Falco's nemesis Anacrites is slowly ingratiating himself with Falco's own mother, persuading her to place her savings with his own at the Golden Horse Bank — which, unfortunately for the two and Falco, goes insolvent.

Falco initially suspects Pisarchus because Pisarchus has recently gone into insolvency, but soon discounts that motive as being insufficient for murder after consulting his banker and his father for advice. Running out of time and options, Falco plays a desperate gambit — bring together Chrysippus' family and his associates who are directly implicated in the murders at a conference at the Chrysippus home for questioning, along with Helena and the vigiles, who have been assisting Falco so far. Eventually, the murderer is identified and it's none other than Diomedes, identified by his accidentally revealing knowledge of how Chrysippus was found dead, and with further corroborating evidence collected during investigation or provided by witnesses at the time of the crime. The novel ends on an ominous tone, with Diomedes being sentenced to a gruesome death, and Falco brooding over tensions between his family and Anacrites, who has tried to woo Maia but was spurned by her.

== Characters ==
=== Family and associates ===
- A. Camillus Aelianus – Older brother of Helena
- Anacrites – Chief Spy
- Geminus – Father of Falco, Auctioneer
- Glaucus and Cotta – Bath House Contractors
- Helena Justina – Wife of Falco, and daughter of the Senator Decimus Camillus Verus
- Junia – Falco's sister
- Junilla Tacita – Mother of Falco
- Maia Favonia – Falco's widowed sister
- Marcus Didius Falco – Informer and Imperial Agent.
- Rutilius Gallicus – Ex-consul

=== Vigiles ===
- Fusculus
- Lucius Petronius Longus – Friend of Falco and Vigiles Officer
- Passus
- Sergius

=== From the world of the arts ===
- Anna – Wife of Trypho
- Aurelius Chrysippus – Patron and Banker
- Avienus – Historian
- Constrictus – Poet
- Euschemon – Scroll-seller
- Pacuvius – Satirist
- Turius – Utopian
- Urbanus Trypho – Playwright

=== From commerce ===
- Bos
- Diomedes – Son of Chrysippus and Lysa
- Lucrio – Banker
- Lysa – First wife of Chrysippus
- Nothokleptes – Banker
- Philomelus – Son of Pisarchus
- Pisarchus – Shipping magnate
- Vibia Second wife of Chrysippus

== Major themes ==
- Investigation into the murder of Aurelius Chrysippus.
- Falco's family: Falco's feud with his sister Junia, development of a relationship between his sister Maia and his friend Lucius Petronius Longus, and intensification of the feud between the Didii and Anacrites, which reaches a climax in Nemesis.
- Beginning of a new plot through the series, which runs through A Body in the Bath House and The Jupiter Myth.
- An insight into banking and finance in Rome.

== Allusions/references to history ==
- Set in Rome in AD 74, during the reign of Emperor Vespasian.

== Release details ==
- 2000, UK, Century Hardback ISBN 0-7126-8034-9
- 2001, UK, Arrow, Paperback ISBN 0-09-929820-1
- 2001, US, Mysterious Press, Hardback ISBN 0-89296-740-4
- US, Mysterious Press, Paperback ISBN 0-446-67906-2
