= Death on the Tiber =

2024 historical crime novel by Lindsey Davis

- Cover of 1st UK hardback edition 2024
- Author: Lindsey Davis
- Series: Flavia Albia
- Genre: historical fiction, crime fiction
- Publisher: Hodder & Stoughton
- Publication date: 4 April 2024
- Publication place: UK
- ISBN: 978-1399719612
- Preceded by: Fatal Legacy
- Followed by: There Will Be Bodies

Death on the Tiber is a historical crime novel by British writer Lindsey Davis, the twelfth in her Flavia Albia series. It was published in the UK on 4 April 2024 by Hodder & Stoughton (ISBN 978-1399719612) and in the United States on 23 July 2024 by Minotaur Books (ISBN 978-1250799906).

The book is set in Rome and Ostia in AD 90. The list of characters includes Marcus Didio Falco ("one-time hero; has he still got it?") and Helena Justina ("his wife, an absoluter heroine") from the Falco series, vigiles from seven cohorts, and members of five underworld gangs. Davis has said that the plot involves a corpse dredged out of the Tiber, the "ever-warring gangster community", "the failings of the various public bodies who are supposed to tackle crime and threats to the community" and "a very elaborate joke about crime writing".

The book refers to events from Davis's earlier book The Jupiter Myth.

The cover of the first UK hardback edition shows a barnacle-encrusted vase on a river-bed with blood flowing out of it. The cover of the first American edition shows a woman looking over the Tiber.
