= Accuser =

Accuser may refer to:

- Someone who accuses
- Satan, whose name means "accuser" (or "adversary") in Hebrew
- Accuser (band), German thrash metal band
- The Accusers, a crime novel
- The Accuser (animated series), a series produced by Stan Lee
- The Accuser (film), a 1977 French film
- Ronan the Accuser, a Marvel Comics character
