= Contubernium (disambiguation) =

Contubernium may refer to

- Contubernium, quasi-marital relationship involving slaves in ancient Rome
- Contubernium (Roman army unit)
