= Scandal Takes a Holiday =

2004 historical crime novel by Lindsey Davis

- First edition
- Author: Lindsey Davis
- Language: English
- Series: Marcus Didius Falco
- Genre: Historical mystery crime novel
- Publisher: Century
- Publication date: 2004
- Publication place: United Kingdom
- Media type: Print (hardback and paperback)
- Pages: 283 pp
- ISBN: 0-7126-2587-9
- OCLC: 57751578
- Preceded by: The Accusers
- Followed by: See Delphi and Die

Scandal Takes a Holiday is a 2004 historical mystery crime novel by Lindsey Davis and the 16th book of the Marcus Didius Falco Mysteries series. Set in Ostia Antica during AD 76, the novel stars Marcus Didius Falco, informer and imperial agent. The title refers to the "holiday" taken by Infamia, gossip columnist of the Daily Gazette.

== Plot summary ==
A long and complicated case awaits Falco and Lucius Petronius Longinus (or Petro' for short) on the streets of the port town of Ostia, accompanied by Maia, Helena and Falco's daughters — Albia, Julia and Favonia. Petro' is on the lookout for Balbinus Florius, a dangerous mobster last seen in Britain, while Falco is on the lookout for a missing gossip columnist named Diocles, an Imperial freedman known by the pen name of "Infamia" (Latin: "scandal", "calumny"). A young boy named Zeno approaches Petro', and tells him that "his mother won't wake up". Zeno's mother is found unconscious and drooling, and Maia is sent to nurse her – only to end up with a black eye when the woman, Pullia, wakes up. When asked why he told them, Zeno replies to Petro' that his uncle Lygon told Zeno that "the vigiles would want to know" if Pullia wouldn't wake up.

Infamia's colleagues Mutatus and Holconius say that Diocles is gifted but dissolute, and believe that he is playing truant, but Falco suspects otherwise. Continuing on the Infamia case, Falco calls on Diocles' landlady, who admits that she has no idea where he has gone to. Falco bribes one of her slaves, Titus, to hand over Diocles' possessions, which but for one note tablet marked with the name "Damagoras" and another engraved with a strange grid-shaped pattern, hand no conclusive leads to Falco. Much to Falco's chagrin, the one man in all of Ostia who seems ready to talk about Damagoras and who he is turns out to be none other than Falco's brother-in-law Gaius Baebius, whom Falco loathes greatly.

Gaius leads Falco to a large estate up north near Portus, where they are assaulted and confined (and Gaius belatedly tells Falco that Damagoras is rumoured to have been a pirate), and brought out later to meet its ostensibly prosperous owner. Damagoras surprisingly treats them hospitably in the opulent surroundings of his villa, and reveals that he was born in Cilicia (a region in Asia Minor notorious for piracy) but when questioned by Falco about being a pirate, Damagoras instantly denies being one or being connected with them, saying he is a "retired sea captain" who contacted Deiocles to "write his memoirs". Falco is not convinced by Damagoras, however, and decides that Damagoras needs to be inspected more closely.

Back in Ostia, the local vigiles chief, Brunnus, suggests that Falco talk to an expert on piracy — a naval officer named Caninus. Caninus, once drunk, however arouses Falco's suspicion: Caninus is a naval attaché who is supposed to be attached with the Imperial fleet at Ravenna on the Adriatic: if so, then what is he doing on the wrong side of the Italian peninsula? Meanwhile, Aulus comes back to Falco with news — the wife to the owner of Aulus' ship to Athens, Aline, has been kidnapped. Falco discovers more clues about the kidnapping racket in Ostia, and discovers that the kidnappers' go-between for contacting hostages' relatives is a cross-dressing man known as "The Illyrian".

Seeking more help, Falco returns to Rome on two errands — the first is Marcus Rubella, Petro's tribune, to inform him of the kidnappings going on in Ostia. The second is to speak to Holconius and Mutatus, but they are out. Nevertheless, a slave in the columnists' office tells Falco the reason Deiocles went back to Ostia – to see his aunt Vestina. En route, Falco meets his father Favonius, who tells Falco that he knows Damagoras as a business partner. Falco's father also reveals that Aline wasn't the first victim — previously, a young girl named Rhodope had also been abducted. Speaking to Rhodope, Helena manages to discover that she was seduced by one of her former captors, named Theopompus. Back in Ostia, Falco tries to locate Vestina, but discovers that she died in a fire almost a year ago, and that Deiocles would normally stay with her.

Falco's sleuthwork also reveal a darker side to law enforcement in Ostia — the vigiles are seen as heavy-handed and not trustworthy, and so fire fighting and security work is done mostly by members of the local builders' guild, headed by a rich building contractor named Privatus. When Rubella's Sixth Vigiles Cohort arrives in Ostia to take over from the Fourth Cohort of Brunnus, Privatus has his men attempt to intimidate the vigiles at the handing-over ceremony. Naturally, Falco asks Privatus about the whereabouts of Diocles, and notes Privatus' seeming disquiet, implying that Privatus is somehow involved with Diocles' disappearance. More note tablets by Diocles turn up, proving that he had contact with someone who had engaged in piracy, mentioning the name of Lygon — Zeno's uncle, and possibly one of Damagoras' henchmen. Falco decides that he needs to question Damagoras again, but once more, Damagoras flatly denies anything to do with piracy or the abductions on the quays. At the same time, Falco and Helena manage to meet Falco's uncle Fulvius, whom Falco has not see for twenty years.

More trouble is in store for Falco, however: Theopompus elopes with Rhodope in Ostia, but is soon murdered — ostensibly by jealous colleagues and the wealthy but hapless Posidonius is forced to cough up for Theopompus' wake. Suddenly, Holconius and Mutatus arrive in Ostia, with what seems to be a large chest full of cash in order to ransom back Diocles on Helena's advice. This causes her to have a heated argument with Falco, but he backs down in the end and following Helena's plan, he asks the vigiles to trail the scribes, but the scribes are assaulted by unknown assailants who take the ransom money, and the vigiles lose the trail. Dejected and disgusted, Falco goes for a walk and bumps into Caninus, who tries to convince Falco that his uncle Fulvius is "the Illyrian", but Falco doesn't believe him and tells Caninus to leave Fulvius alone. Much later, however, Falco catches sight of the alleged kidnappers with the ransom chest, and tails them to a military dock, where they are planning to board a liburna, but is spotted and attacked. Falco, outnumbered, is defeated in the ensuing scuffle and realises that Caninus is connected with the pirates operating in Ostia.

Now taken prisoner, Falco discovers that he is on board a pirate ship and confronts her Illyrian captain Cotys. Cotys and his crew taunt Falco and force him to climb down a ladder into the water, but when they discover that the scribes' chest is actually full if pebbles, Cotys cuts the ladder off in anger, dropping Falco overboard. By a twist of fate, Falco is rescued by his father and his father's porter Gornia. It turns out that Geminus has been smuggling goods into Ostia from offshore, possibly with help from Fulvius. Once back, Falco hastily returns into town to attend Theopomous' wake, presided over by Rhodope. As usual, things get out of hand once Rhodope identifies a suspect for Theopomous' death at his wake, sparking a gang war which results in a three-way melee between the Illyrians, Cilicians and the vigiles. Falco, his family as well as Petro' manage to rescue Rhodope from the fight and take refuge in a mausoleum, where she finally reveals that during her captivity she was drugged (possibly by Pullia) and held in a sacrificial vault in a temple. After being rescued along with Petro and the rest, Falco follows Mutatus into a temple to Cybele to meet with Diocles' supposed captors, where he bumps into Fulvius, who reveals that he works for the Navy as an intelligence gatherer, and that he has been watching Caninus, who is the actual "Illyrian" — this is soon proven when they hear Caninus demanding the ransom money from Mutatus, before killing him. Caninus is shortly afterwards detained by the vigiles, never to be seen again.

But what of Diocles? Damagoras finally breaks his silence and offers Falco information in return for Diocles' note tablets. Damagoras asserts that he and Diocles were indeed working on publishing the old sea dog's memoirs, but Diocles was depressed at having lost his aunt in the fire. Damagoras also warns Falco that Diocles might have blamed Privatus for Vestina's death, and the building guild then had Diocles murdered to silence him. Falco finally figures out what the strange grid pattern in Deiocles' possession was — it's a map, and shows that Diocles may have been working on the old vigiles station prior to disappearing. The vigiles send for a diver to look for Diocles in a cistern under the vigiles house, and confirm Damagoras' story, when they find a human corpse weighed down deep in it.

== Characters ==
=== Family and associates ===
- A. Camillus Aelianus – Helena's elder brother
- Albia – British girl adopted by Helena and Falco
- Decimus Camillus Verus – Helena's father
- Fulvius – Falco's uncle, the "black sheep" of the Falco family
- Gaius Baebius – Junia's husband, a senior customs clerk
- Geminus – Falco's father, an auctioneer
- Helena Justina – Falco's wife, daughter of the Senator Decimus Camillus Verus
- Julia Junilla and Sosia Favonia – Daughters of Falco and Helena
- Julia Justa – Helena's mother
- Junia – Falco's sister
- Junilla Tacita – Falco's mother
- Maia Favonia – Falco's widowed sister
- Marcus Didius Falco – Principal character, narrator; informer and occasional imperial agent
- Q. Camillus Justinus – Younger brother of Helena

=== Staff of the Daily Gazette ===
- Diocles – Correspondent, gossip columnist
- Holconius – Political reporter
- Mutatus – Sports commentator
- Vestina

=== Vigiles ===
- Brunnus – Leader of the VI Cohort's Ostia detachment
- Fusculus – Member of the IV Cohort
- Lucius Petronius Longus – Friend of Falco and officer of the vigiles
- Marcus Rubella – Tribune of the IV Cohort
- Passus – Member of the IV Cohort
- Rusticus – Recruiting officer
- Virtus – Slave

=== Others in Ostia ===
- Aline – Ship's owner
- Antemon – Sea captain
- Banno Ship's owner
- Caninus – Naval attaché
- Cotys – Illyrian
- Cratidas – Cilician
- Damagoras – Cilician
- Lygon – Cilician
- Posidonius – Importer
- Privatus – President of the Builders Guild
- Pullia – Cilician
- Rhodope – Daughter of Posidonius
- Theopompus – Illyrian
- Zeno – Cilician

== Major themes ==
- Investigation into the disappearance of a gossip columnist.
- Investigation into possible piracy around Ostia.

== References to history ==
- Set in Ostia Antica in AD 76, during the reign of Emperor Vespasian.

== Release details ==
- 2004, UK, Century Hardback ISBN 0-7126-2587-9
- 2004, UK, Arrow, Paperback ISBN 0-09-944527-1
- UK Audio BBC AudioBooks read by Jamie Glover, Cassette ISBN 1-4056-0062-4, CD ISBN 1-4056-7171-8
- 2004, US, Mysterious Press, Hardback ISBN 0-89296-812-5
- 2006, US, St Martins Press, Paperback ISBN 0-312-94040-8
