= A Dying Light in Corduba =

1996 novel by Lindsey Davis

- First edition
- Author: Lindsey Davis
- Language: English
- Series: Marcus Didius Falco
- Genre: Historical mystery crime novel
- Published: 1996 (Century)
- Publication place: United Kingdom
- Media type: Print (hardback and paperback)
- Pages: 352 pp
- ISBN: 0-7126-5941-2
- OCLC: 227274028
- Preceded by: Time to Depart
- Followed by: Three Hands in the Fountain

A Dying Light in Corduba is a 1996 historical mystery crime novel by Lindsey Davis and the eighth book of the Marcus Didius Falco Mysteries series. Set in Rome and Imperial Spain during the spring and summer of AD 73, the novel stars Marcus Didius Falco, informer and imperial agent. The title refers to the setting of much of the action, Corduba, as well as to the olive oil which features heavily in the plot, one use of which is for lamp oil.

== Plot summary ==
The Society of Olive Oil Producers of Baetica is throwing a big dinner party in Rome, trying to drum up business for their product. Falco is invited at the request of Claudius Laeta, Vespasian’s top clerk. Two guests at a dinner are assaulted, one fatally. The surviving victim, Anacrites, is Falco's rival and Vespasian's Chief Spy. Falco is asked to investigate the attack on Anacrites and its possible connection to an attempt to corner the market on Spanish olive oil. Trying to keep Anacrites safe, he moves him to the one place where no one will look: his mother’s house.

Falco travels to Hispania with his pregnant companion Helena Justina to track down some of the guests and the dancer from the dinner. Laeta hints that someone is looking to corner the market on Hispania’s olive oil production. Suspicion immediately falls on Quinctius Attractus, the host of the festivities that fatal evening.

Falco and Helena stay at the estate of her father Camillus Verus. Her brother Aelianus is also spending time there. Helena becomes friendly with the daughters of two local magnates, Claudia Rufina and Aelia Annaea. Falco gets to know some of the sons, including Claudia’s brother Constans. Also appearing is Attractus’ son Quadratus, the new quaestor of Baetica. That one item alone keeps Falco on guard.

While concluding the interviews of the dinner guests, Falco finally catches up with the dancer, Selia, who promptly tries to kill him with the help of her band. Before she strikes the final blow, she reveals that Laeta sent her too, not to find the killer, but to stop anyone following, a classic double cross. Falco suspects something, but the obvious suspect is his guest and claiming an injury. Claudia is convinced it was not an accident, and she asks Falco to investigate. Seeing the site of the death, he is convinced someone else was there when Constans died.

Falco goes to the Quinctius estate, and finds Selia dead and Quadratus gone. This death is much more elegant, and soon another Dancer appears: Perella. She is working for Anacrites, who was still alive when she saw him last, now with the Praetorian guard, but still being nursed by Falco’s mother.

Still not trusting Perella, Falco decides to share his information with her, and they piece together the real plot. Attractus and Quadratus are part of the plan because Laeta needs some legitimacy, and the Quinctii have enough influence to make it at least appear to be on the up and up. Falco also learns that Quadratus was indeed with Constans when he died. With Helena ready to give birth, Falco sends her east by land while he rides to catch Quadratus before he kills someone else. Falco is able to capture Quadratus, and returns to Helena in time for the birth of their child, a girl.

== Characters ==
=== Romans ===
- A. Camillus Aelianus – Eldest son of Decimus Camillus Verus
- Anacrites – Imperial spy
- Calisthenus – Architect
- Cornelius – Ex-quaestor of Baetica
- Decimus Camillus Verus – Senator and father of Helena Justina
- Gn. Drusillus Placidus – Procurator
- Helena Justina – Daughter of the Senator Decimus Camillus Verus and wife of Falco
- Helva – Usher
- Julia Justa – Wife of Camillus Verus and mother of Helena
- Junilla Tacita – Mother of Falco
- L. Petronius Longus – Enquiry chief in the XIII region and friend of Falco
- Marcus Didius Falco – Informer and Imperial Agent from the Aventine.
- Momus – Slave overseer
- Perella – Dancer
- Q. Camillus Justinus – Youngest son of Decimus Camillus Verus
- Quinctius Attractus – Senator
- Stertius – Transport manager
- T. Claudius Laeta – Imperial clerk
- T. Quinctius Quadratus – Son of Quinctius Attractus
- Titus Caesar – Eldest son of the Emperor
- Valentinus – Imperial agent
- Vespasian – Emperor

=== Baeticans ===
- Aelia Annaea – Widow
- Annaeus Maximus – Landowner
- Claudia Adorata – Wife of Licinius Rufius
- Claudia Rufina – Granddaughter of Licinius Rufius
- Cyzacus Junior – Poet
- Cyzacus Senior – Bargee
- Gorax – Retired gladiator
- Licinius Rufius – Landowner
- Marius Optatus – Tenant
- Marmarides – Driver
- Norbanus – Negotiator
- Rufius Constans – Grandson of Licinius Rufius
- Selia – Dancer

== Allusions/references to actual history, geography and current science ==
- Set in Rome and Baetica in AD 73, during the reign of Emperor Vespasian.

== Release details ==
- 1996, UK, Century (ISBN 0-7126-5941-2), Pub date 6 June 1996, hardback (First edition)
- 1998, USA, Mysterious Press (ISBN 0-89296-664-5), Pub date ? January 1998, hardback
- 2003, UK, Arrow, Paperback (ISBN 0-09-945199-9) (as part of single-volume omnibus edition, Falco on the Loose, with Last Act in Palmyra and Time to Depart)
