= Murder in Purple and Gold =

2026 historical crime novel by Lindsey Davis

- Cover of 1st UK hardback edition 2026
- Author: Lindsey Davis
- Series: Flavia Albia
- Genre: historical fiction, crime fiction
- Publisher: Hodder & Stoughton
- Publication date: 2 April 2026
- Publication place: UK
- ISBN: 9781399747981
- Preceded by: There Will Be Bodies
- Followed by: Ghosts of Our Ancestors (2027); The Titan's Apprentice (2028)

Murder in Purple and Gold is a historical crime novel by British writer Lindsey Davis, the fourteenth in her Flavia Albia series. It was published in the UK on 2 April 2026 by Hodder & Stoughton (ISBN 9781399747981), and in the United States on 7 July 2026 by Severn House (ISBN 9781448320790). An audiobook edition, narrated by Jane Collingwood, has been published by Hodder & Stoughton.

The book is set in Rome, in the "dangerous and glamorous world of charioteers", with the story starting when Flavia finds the body of dead charioteer Lepos near the Circus Maximus: the opening sentence is "A murderer needs to know that any body he is dumping will probably be found by a dog-walker."

The cover of the first UK hardback edition shows a knife with a bloodstained curved point, lying on bloodstained purple fabric on what might be a large pot or shard. (The text of the book makes clear that this is a small falx, the kind of knife a charioteer would use as a "safety knife" to cut themself free from the reins if their chariot overturned.) The cover of the first US hardback edition appears to show a golden model of a chariot and charioteer against a background of purple fabric.

The UK first edition of the book has an "Author's Preface" in which Davis states: "This novel was written by a human being with no use of AI. ... If it makes you laugh, if it makes you think, if it makes you glad we have communicated, then what we used to know as humanity will remain alive."

There is a prefatory quote from Pliny the Younger about devotion to the charioteers' racing colours. The book is set among the "Factions" which competed in Rome's chariot racing: the traditional blue, green, red and white and the two new factions sponsored by Domitian: purple and gold.

The action of the book takes place in Rome, between 25 April and 3 May 90AD, starting with the festival of Robigalia. The list of characters is headed by Flavia Albia and her husband Tiberius Manlius Faustus, described as "a heroic couple", and includes a large cast featuring their relatives (including Albia's parents Falco and Helena) and household, the members of six chariot factions, and miscellaneous others such as "Costus: a thwarted home invader" and "Servata, a motherly auntie: running a bar".

A reviewer for Shots: Crme and Thriller e-Zine, who commented that "Davis is widely regarded as our foremost Ancient Rome author", wrote:

Murder in Purple and Gold tackles a new aspect of Roman life – one that is, of course, wide open to underhand deals, subterfuge, huge money being made, and horrible death. This then, is Chariot racing. ... As always, we learn a lot about Roman life and Rome herself, without really knowing we are being instructed – from food and chefs to low lifers and the aristocracy, from hairstyles and beauty salons to slavery, and in this case, how to race chariots.
