= Rebels and Traitors =

Historical novel by Lindsey Davis set during the English Civil War

First edition (publ. Century)

Rebels and Traitors by British historical novelist Lindsey Davis (best known for her Marcus Didius Falco series) was published by Random House in September 2009 (ISBN 9781846056321). In contrast to the ancient Roman setting of the Falco books and Course of Honour, this book is set in the English Civil War period of the 17th century. At 742 pages it is substantially longer than her previous novels.

The prologue takes place on 30 January 1649 at the execution of King Charles I at the Palace of Whitehall, London. The main body of the book then begins in 1634, and the endpaper blurb describes the book as being set in Birmingham, where the author was born, Oxford, where she studied, and London, where she now lives.

Davis has said that her interest in this period goes back to when a print of the Laughing Cavalier by Frans Hals hung in her primary school classroom, and was further developed when she read Rosemary Sutcliff's novels Simon and The Rider of the White Horse.

== Dedication ==
The dedication is "For Richard / dearest and closest of friends / your favourite book / in memory", and the author's website tells that "I am still getting used to life without my dear Richard. For those of you who haven't seen this before, he died in October [2008]". The author says in her publisher's newsletter: "The greatest recommendation I can give is that Richard, its first reader, thought it wonderful. He devoured chunks, demanding ‘Bring more story!’ even when he was in hospital. One of the last things I was ever able to tell him was that Rebels and Traitors was to be published by Random House, so I would be working with dear friends for his favourite book."

== Plot summary ==
The story follows the experiences of two main protagonists: Gideon Jukes, a printer from London who joins the New Model Army, and Juliana Carlill, who, as a result of her marriage to the Royalist Orlando Lovell, experiences many vicissitudes. Their stories are linked through the activities of other characters, including the ne'er-do-well Kinchin Tew, the innocent and upright Edmund Treves, and real-life political figures such as Edward Sexby and Thomas Rainborough.
