= A Capitol Death =

2019 historical crime novel by Lindsey Davis

- Cover of 2019 UK first edition
- Author: Lindsey Davis
- Series: Flavia Albia
- Genre: historical fiction, crime fiction
- Publisher: Hodder & Stoughton, St. Martin's Press
- Publication date: 4 April 2019
- Publication place: UK
- Media type: Print, e-book, audiobook, large print
- ISBN: 9781473658745
- Preceded by: Pandora's Boy
- Followed by: The Grove of the Caesars

A Capitol Death is a historical crime novel by British writer Lindsey Davis, the seventh in her Flavia Albia series. It was published in the UK by Hodder & Stoughton on 4 April 2019 (ISBN 9781473658745).

The tale is set in November AD 89 on the Capitoline Hill, and includes a death by falling from the Tarpeian Rock, a stinking family of shell-fish boilers who produce the imperial purple dye, the preparations for Domitian's double triumph, family relationships, and augury, while Flavia and her husband are setting up their new household.

The cover of the UK hardback 1st edition shows a sea shell, likely to be the dye-producing bolinus brandaris, on a purple, perhaps bloodstained, background.

In an interview with her editor Oliver Johnson, Davis discussed her successful plan to base a series of books on the seven hills of Rome, starting with the Aventine Hill and reaching the Capitoline Hill with this latest book.
