= The Third Nero =

2017 historical crime novel by Lindsey Davis

The Third Nero: or Never Say Nero Again
- Cover of 2017 UK first edition
- Author: Lindsey Davis
- Series: Flavia Albia
- Genre: historical fiction, crime fiction
- Publisher: Hodder & Stoughton, St. Martin's Press
- Publication date: 6 April 2017
- Publication place: UK
- Media type: Print, e-book, audiobook, large print
- Pages: 398
- ISBN: 978-1-4736-1343-0
- Preceded by: The Graveyard of the Hesperides
- Followed by: Pandora's Boy

The Third Nero: or Never Say Nero Again is a historical crime novel by British writer Lindsey Davis, the fifth in her Flavia Albia series. It was first published in the UK on 6 April 2017 by Hodder & Stoughton (ISBN 978-1-473-61343-0) and in the United States in 2017 by St. Martin's Press.

The tale is set in Ancient Rome and opens in September AD 89, immediately after the previous novel The Graveyard of the Hesperides closes (Flavia's husband having been struck by lightning during their wedding celebration).

The story revolves around the third Pseudo-Nero, who had the support of the Parthians. Falco and Helena, Albia's adoptive parents, are mentioned but do not appear. The plot also involves a vicious white cat, a war elephant, a military archive, cataphracts and several references to public toilets including "the event which would supersede everything else when the Daily Gazette wrote up today's events".

The UK paperback cover image is of a two-faced Janus head from Vulci.

The book received a starred review in Publishers Weekly. Writing for the Historical Novel Society, Marilyn Sherlock positively compared it to Davis' Marcus Didius Falco series and called the characters "well-drawn".
