= The Grove of the Caesars =

2020 historical crime novel by Lindsey Davis

- Cover of 1st UK hardback edition 2020
- Author: Lindsey Davis
- Series: Flavia Albia
- Genre: historical fiction, crime fiction
- Publisher: Hodder & Stoughton, St. Martin's Press
- Publication date: 2 April 2020
- Publication place: UK
- Media type: Print, e-book, audiobook, large print
- ISBN: 9781529374247
- Preceded by: A Capitol Death
- Followed by: A Comedy of Terrors

The Grove of the Caesars is a historical crime novel by British writer Lindsey Davis, the eighth in her Flavia Albia series. It was published in the UK by Hodder & Stoughton on 2 April 2020 (ISBN 9781529374247).

The story is set in 1st century Rome, in and around the gardens beyond the Tiber, and features a serial killer, a buried collection of ancient scrolls, a shipwreck, a sad pair of dancing boys and much else. It reflects on the follies of the world of antiquarian scroll-collecting, with special reference to the writer Didymus Dodomos, described in the list of characters as "a ghastly horticulturalist, ghost-written".
