= Three Hands in the Fountain =

1997 novel by Lindsey Davis

- First edition
- Author: Lindsey Davis
- Language: English
- Series: Marcus Didius Falco
- Genre: Historical mystery crime novel
- Publisher: Arrow Books, Mysterious Press
- Publication date: 1997
- Publication place: United Kingdom
- Media type: Print (hardback and paperback)
- Pages: 304 pp
- ISBN: 0-7126-7791-7
- OCLC: 267166076
- Preceded by: A Dying Light in Corduba
- Followed by: Two for the Lions

Three Hands in the Fountain is a 1997 historical mystery crime novel by Lindsey Davis and the ninth book of the Marcus Didius Falco Mysteries series. Set in Rome between August and October, AD 73, the novel stars Marcus Didius Falco, informer and imperial agent. The title alludes to the song "Three Coins in the Fountain" as well as to the macabre discovery which triggers Falco's investigation.

== Plot summary ==
Falco arrives home in Rome with Helena Justina and Julia Junilla Laeitana, his new baby daughter, and barely have time to settle in before being subjected to a welcome-home party. Falco and Petronius sneak out for a drink in a nearby street next to a fountain, which is not working. When a worker turns up to clean it, it is revealed that a severed hand had blocked the aqueduct. Falco and Petro start to investigate, but their case is stolen by Anacrites. Petro puts up a sign proclaiming that awards are to be given on the discovery of any body parts. Falco talks to his brother-in-law and is told that severed body parts have been discovered in the rivers and aqueducts for several years, usually after festivals. When he's told that Petro put up the sign he runs back to his old apartment (where Petro now lives after being kicked out by his wife) as a slave hands over a new hand to Petro. Petro takes down the sign.

Anacrites, who is rather annoyed at being muscled out of his stolen case, sends four men to beat up Falco and Petro. They defeat the bruisers easily and trail them back to Anacrites. Soon afterwards, Julius Frontinus finds and gives over a new hand. It looks the same as the other hands but this one has a wedding ring with two names inscribed (Asinia and Caius). They track down Caius Cicurrus, the widower of Asinia. He is innocent and is greatly grieving for his lost wife. Petro's wife dumped him after he took up with Balbina Milvia from Time to Depart. Milvia's husband Florius sends men to beat up Falco and Petro. Falco, with the help of his trainer Glaucus and Glaucus's trainees, beats off his attackers but Petro has no such help and is heavily injured. Milvia comes to Falco asking him to help her, as she fears that her mother, who has vanished, has been taken by the killer. Falco finds Cornella Flaccida at a new apartment. He goes out to the country but finds no suspects. After continuous reconnaissance he has two problems: First, Claudia Rufina, the heiress from A Dying Light In Corduba and the new fiancee to Helena's brother Aelianus, has vanished, and second, a slave called Thurius has been identified as the murderer. Falco goes out to rescue Claudia and apprehend Thurius. He captures Thurius and finds his lair and his victim. He finds that it's not Claudia, it's Milvia's mother, who vanished again. Unlike Claudia, however, no one liked her enough to send out a search party. Claudia is later found to have eloped with Helena's other brother Justinus, an act that has disastrous consequences. The book ends with Falco telling Petro his wife went out with another man, and later receiving a visit from Anacrites.

== Characters ==
=== Friends and family ===
- Anacrites – Imperial spy
- Arria Silvia – Wife of L. Petronius Longus
- Camillus Aelianus – Eldest son of Decimus Camillus Verus
- Camillus Justinus – Youngest son of Decimus Camillus Verus
- Claudia Rufina – Betrothed to Aelianus
- Decimus Camillus Verus – Senator and father of Helena Justina
- Fusculus – Member of Petronius' enquiry team
- Gaius – Falco's Nephew
- Helena Justina – Wife of Falco, and daughter of the Senator Decimus Camillus Verus
- Julia Junilla Laeitana – Infant daughter of Falco and Helena.
- Julia Justa – Wife of Camillus Verus and mother of Helena
- Junilla Tacita – Mother of Falco
- Lollius – Father of Gaius
- Lucius Petronius Longus – Enquiry chief in the XIII region and friend of Falco
- Marcus Didius Falco – Informer and Imperial Agent.
- Marcus Rubella – Tribune of the Fourth Cohort of vigiles
- Marina – Ex-lover of Falco's brother, Festus
- Martinus – Deputy
- Scythax – Doctor
- Sergius – Punishment officer

=== Suspects, victims and others ===
- Asinia – Wife of Caius Cicurrus
- Aurelia Maesia – Daughter of Rosius Mundus
- Balbina Milvia – Daughter of Balbinus, former Crime Boss
- Bolanus – Assistant to Statius
- Caius Cicurrus – Corn Chandler
- Cordus – Slave
- Cornella Flaccida – Wife of Balbinus
- Damon – Driver
- Florius – Husband of Milvia
- Mundus – Pia's lover
- Pia – Friend of Asinia
- Rosius Gratus – Old man
- S. Julius Frontinus – Former Consul
- Statius – Engineer
- Thurius – Servant

== Major themes ==
- Investigation into the murder and mutilation of Roman women during the Games,
- Developing relationship of Marcus Didius Falco and Helena Justina.

== Allusions/references to actual history, geography and current science ==
- Set in Rome in AD 73, during the reign of Emperor Vespasian.
- Sextus Julius Frontinus was a Roman soldier, politician, engineer and author, who was appointed superintendent of the aqueducts (curator aquarum) at Rome in AD 95.
- Helena playfully suggests that she and Marcus buy the farmhouse near Tibur (modern-day Tivoli) they are using as a base for their investigations; Marcus retorts that no one with any taste or sense would want to own land in that area. This appears to be an inside joke, since they are located near the site where the Emperor Hadrian built his famous villa in the 2nd century AD.

== Release details ==
- 1997, UK, Century Hardback ISBN 0-7126-7791-7
- 1998, UK, Arrow, Paperback ISBN 0-09-979951-0
- 1999, UK, Chivers Press, Large Print, ISBN 0-7540-1288-3
- 1999, US, Mysterious Press, Hardback ISBN 0-89296-691-2
- 2000, US, Warner Books, Paperback ISBN 0-446-60774-6
