= A Comedy of Terrors =

2021 historical crime novel by Lindsey Davis

- Cover of 1st UK hardback edition 2021
- Author: Lindsey Davis
- Series: Flavia Albia
- Genre: historical fiction, crime fiction
- Publisher: Hodder & Stoughton, Minotaur Books
- Publication date: 1 April 2021
- Publication place: UK
- ISBN: 9781529374322
- Preceded by: The Grove of the Caesars
- Followed by: Desperate Undertaking

A Comedy of Terrors is a historical crime novel by British writer Lindsey Davis, the ninth in her Flavia Albia series. It was published in the UK on 1 April 2021 by Hodder & Stoughton (ISBN 9781529374322) and in the United States on 27 July 2021 by Minotaur Books (ISBN 978-1250241542).

The novel is set in 89 AD, starting during "the week before Saturnalia: 12–17 December". It features nuts ("both the snack and missile of choice of tipsy celebrants") and threats to the emperor ("Domitian himself is a target for the old criminals' new schemes").

Falco and his wife Helena appear in the list of "Our festival characters", described as "her [Flavia Albia's] iconic parents".

== Reception ==
The book was chosen as a Sunday Times Crime Club Star Pick. Publishers Weekly's reviewer said that "Davis convincingly depicts first-century mobsters, an aspect of ancient Roman criminality that's been underutilized by authors writing about this period. This series remains as fresh as ever." The reviewer for the Historical Novel Society's Historical Novel Review described the book as " vintage Lindsey Davis. ... She writes with verve and vitality, swooping from comedy to tragedy to a satisfying conclusion, with a tip of a Saturnalia wreath to Tiberius's [her husband's] pie charts." It was included in The Guardian's "This Month's Best Paperbacks" and in The Observer's list of "The best recent thrillers", where it was described as "Lighthearted, witty and effortlessly clever" and "a window into ancient Rome, and a tonic and a joy to read". The Times, in a paperback roundup, quotes critic Mark Sanderson: ""The Flavia Albia series are far more than mere mash-ups of Up Pompeii! The research supports her beady-eyed examination of human relationships."
