= Premio Colosseo =

The Premio Colosseo is a prize awarded to a person who has enhanced the image of the city of Rome. It was inaugurated in 2009, the 2000th anniversary of the birth of emperor Vespasian, builder of the Colosseum. The award is a silver model of the Colosseum.

== List of winners of the Premio Colosseo ==
- 2009: Franco Zeffirelli, Italian film director
- 2010: Lindsey Davis, English author whose Falco books are set in Rome
