= Last Act in Palmyra =

1994 novel by Lindsey Davis

- First edition
- Author: Lindsey Davis
- Language: English
- Series: Marcus Didius Falco
- Genre: Historical mystery crime novel
- Publisher: Century
- Publication date: 1994
- Publication place: United Kingdom
- Media type: Print (hardback and paperback)
- Pages: 384 pp
- ISBN: 0-7126-5936-6
- OCLC: 227274020
- Preceded by: Poseidon's Gold
- Followed by: Time to Depart

Last Act in Palmyra is a 1994 historical mystery crime novel by Lindsey Davis and the sixth book of the Marcus Didius Falco Mysteries series. Set in Rome, Nabatea, and Palmyra, the novel stars Marcus Didius Falco, informer and imperial agent. The title refers to the hunt undertaken by Falco for a murderer, the last act of which takes place in Palmyra, as well as plays upon Falco's temporary employment as a playwright with a travelling theatre group.

== Plot summary ==
In Last Act in Palmyra, Falco takes on a new spying mission for Vespasian to the east of the Empire. He also plans to investigate the disappearance of a young musician, Sophrona. Falco and Helena Justina travel to Petra, where they encounter a theatre group who have just lost their playwright due to drowning. Joining them, Falco attempts to fulfill his various investigations, whilst at the same time write his new play, The Spook Who Spoke.

== Characters in "Last Act in Palmyra" ==
=== Main characters ===
- Anacrites — Imperial spy
- Helena Justina — Daughter of the Senator Decimus Camillus Verus
- Marcus Didius Falco — Informer and Imperial Agent from the Aventine.
- Musa — Priest from Dushara
- Sophrona — Musician, player of the water organ
- Thalia — Snake dancer

=== The theatre company ===
- Byrria — Actress
- Chremes — Actor-manager
- Congrio — Billposter
- Davos — Actor
- Grumio — Clown
- Philocrates — Actor
- Phrygia — Actress, wife of Chremes
- Tranio — Clown

=== The orchestra ===
- Afrania — Tibia-player
- Ione — Tambourinist
- Plancina — Panpipe girl
- Ribes — Lyre-player

== Major themes ==
- Several investigations, including a spying mission for the emperor, a disappearing musician, and the murder of a travelling playwright.
- Developing relationship of Marcus Didius Falco and Helena Justina.
- The history and culture of the Roman Middle East (namely Arabia Petraea and Roman Syria).

== Allusions/references to other works ==
- Members of the company make many references to New Comedy.
- As noted in the footnotes (p. 401 UK paperback edition), Falco's play, The Spook Who Spoke, bears more than a little resemblance to Hamlet by William Shakespeare.
- During the course of their journey, the travelling theatre company perform or refer to various plays, poems and playwrights. These include:
  - Medea, The Trojan Women and The Bacchae by Euripides
  - The Birds by Aristophanes
  - Oedipus Rex by Sophocles
  - The Girl from Andros and The Mother-in-Law by Terence
  - The Rope, The Pot of Gold and Amphitryon by Plautus
  - The Arbitration by Menander
  - The Garland by Meleager
  - Aeschylus

== Allusions/references to actual history, geography and current science ==
- Begins in Rome in AD 72, during the reign of Emperor Vespasian.
- The journey takes them through Nabatea to Petra, then to the Decapolis and Palmyra.

== Release details ==
- 1994, UK, Century Hardback (out of print)
- 1995, UK, Arrow, Paperback ISBN 0-09-983180-5
- 1995, UK, Magna, Large Print, ISBN 0-7505-0839-6
- 1996, US, Mysterious Press, Hardback (out of print)
- 1997, US, Mysterious Press, Paperback ISBN 0-446-40474-8
- 2003, UK, Arrow, Paperback ISBN 0-09-945199-9 (as part of single-volume omnibus edition, Falco on the Loose, with Time to Depart and A Dying Light in Corduba)
