= Master and God =

2012 novel by Lindsey Davis

- First edition
- Author: Lindsey Davis
- Language: English
- Genre: Historical fiction
- Publisher: Hodder & Stoughton
- Publication date: 15 March 2012
- Publication place: United Kingdom
- Media type: Print
- Pages: 496
- ISBN: 9781444707328

Master and God is a historical novel by British writer Lindsey Davis, the author of the Falco series. It was first published in the UK on 15 March 2012 by Hodder & Stoughton and in the United States on 5 June 2012 by St Martin's Press.

It is set in ancient Rome in the time of the emperor Domitian and the story features a paranoid emperor, a hairdresser's love-life, the burial alive of the Chief of the Vestal Virgins, conspiracy and death.

== Reviews ==
In a review for The Independent, Jane Jakeman called the narrative "rapid" and described the story as "well told with much sharp-edged detail". A Kirkus Reviews review of the book described it as "Another detailed and witty recounting of ancient Roman life, public and private".
