= Caenis =

Mistress of Roman Emperor Vespasian

Antonia Caenis, (died 75 AD) a former slave and secretary of Antonia Minor (mother of the emperor Claudius), was Roman emperor Vespasian's contubernalis.

== Life ==
It could be thought that she had family in Istria, now in Croatia, based on a trip she took there (Suet. Dom. 12.3). In her 30s Caenis, still possibly a slave, was in an unofficial type of relationship with Vespasian, known as contubernium, before his marriage. According to Suetonius, after the death of Vespasian's wife Flavia Domitilla, Vespasian and Caenis, now a freedwoman, resumed their relationship; she was his wife "in all but name" until her death in AD 75.

According to Cassius Dio, she had a remarkable memory and considerable influence on the emperor's administration, carried out official business on his behalf, and apparently made a lot of money from her position. However, Suetonius states that she was treated with disrespect by Vespasian's son Domitian, who refused to greet her as one of the family.

== Popular culture ==
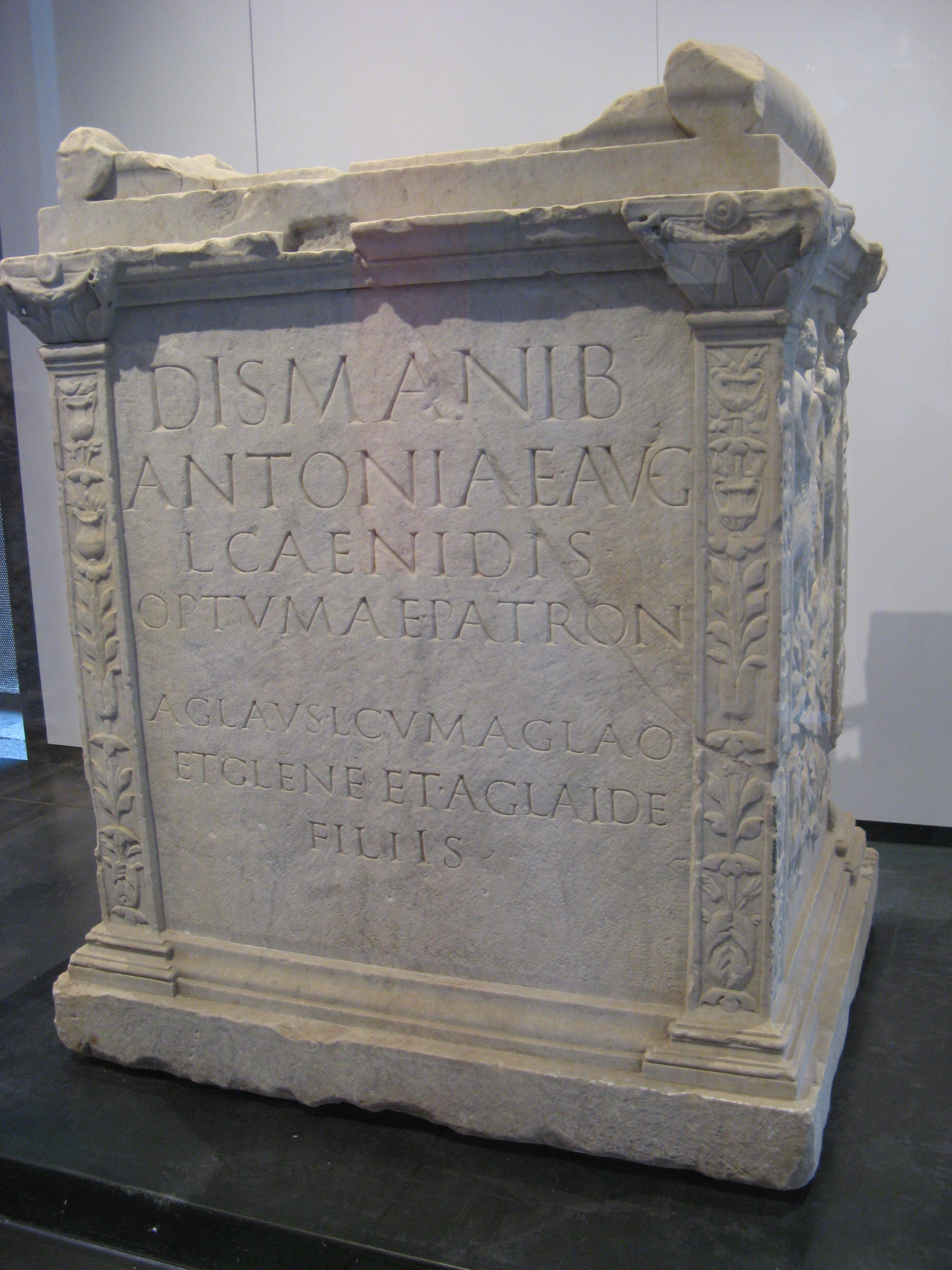
Inscription commemorating Caenis, described by the historian Suetonius as the "almost wife" of Vespasian

The life of Caenis and her love-story with Vespasian are portrayed in Lindsey Davis's novel The Course of Honour. She is also a character who features regularly in Robert Fabbri's Vespasian series, in which she is depicted as a long-lost grand-niece of the king of the Caenii, a rebelling tribe in Thracia.

Robert Graves, in his short story "Caenis on Incest", used her as a kind of foil to present what he then thought to have been the underlying reason for the power-related murders chronicled in I, Claudius. The story is included in his compendium "Occupation: Writer", and he admits to having missed the real reason for the murders in the introduction to that anthology.

== See also ==
- List of slaves
- Claudia Acte
- Galeria Lysistrate
- Marcia (mistress of Commodus)

== Sources ==
- Suetonius, Lives of the Twelve Caesars: Vespasian 3, 21; Domitian 12.3
- Dio Cassius, Roman History 66.14
- William Smith (1870), Dictionary of Greek and Roman Biography and Mythology
