= Two for the Lions =

1998 historical mystery crime novel by Lindsey Davis

- First edition
- Author: Lindsey Davis
- Language: English
- Series: Marcus Didius Falco
- Genre: Historical mystery crime novel
- Publisher: Century
- Publication date: 1998
- Publication place: United Kingdom
- Media type: Print (hardback and paperback)
- Pages: 400 pp (Hardback edition)
- ISBN: 0-7126-7796-8
- OCLC: 267166212
- Preceded by: Three Hands in the Fountain
- Followed by: One Virgin Too Many

Two for the Lions is a 1998 historical mystery crime novel by Lindsey Davis and the 10th book of the Marcus Didius Falco Mysteries series. Set in Rome and Tripolitania between December AD 73 and May AD 74, during the reign of Emperor Vespasian, the novel stars Marcus Didius Falco, informer and imperial agent. The title refers to the execution of criminals in the arena, by trained lions.

== Plot summary ==
As part of his attempts to earn enough money to buy himself into the upper middle ranks, and thus make his relationship with Helena Justina respectable, Marcus Didius Falco has offered his services to Vespasian as a tax collector during the "great Census" of AD 73. Unfortunately, his plan has several flaws, one major one being his need to take on Anacrites as a partner.

Whilst conducting the audit of two gladiatorial training schools, Falco stumbles upon the apparent murder of a star man-eating lion and an apparent rivalry between the schools. When a gladiator also ends up dead, Falco takes on the investigation, one which leads him to Tripolitania.

To add to the confusion, Helena's younger brother, Camillus Justinus, has eloped with the betrothed of his older brother, Aelianus. They too have made their way to North Africa, drawn by Justinus' quest to find Silphium, an expensive herb already deemed extinct.

== Major themes ==
- The "great Census" of AD 73,
- The elopement of Camillus Justinus and Claudia Rufina,
- The investigation into the rivalry between gladiatorial trainers,
- Developing relationship of Marcus Didius Falco and Helena Justina.

== Characters ==
=== Friends ===
- Anacrites – Imperial spy and partner of Falco
- Camillus Aelianus – Eldest son of Decimus Camillus Verus
- Camillus Justinus – Youngest son of Decimus Camillus Verus
- Claudia Rufina – Heiress
- Decimus Camillus Verus – Senator and father of Helena Justina
- Famia – Maia's husband
- Helena Justina – Wife of Falco, and daughter of the Senator Decimus Camillus Verus
- Junilla Tacita – Mother of Falco
- Lenia – Laundress
- Maia – Falco's sister
- Marcus Didius Falco – Informer and Imperial Agent.
- Smaractus – Husband of Lenia
- Thalia – Circus manager

=== Romans ===
- Antonia Caenis – Mistress of Vespasian
- Buxus – Animal Keeper
- Claudius Laeta – Senior Palace Administrator
- Pomponius Urtica – Praetor
- Rumex – Gladiator
- Rutilius Gallicus – Special envoy to Tripolitania
- Scilla
- Vespasian Augustus – Emperor of Rome

=== Tripolitanians ===
- Artemisia – Wife of Calliopus
- Calliopus – Venatio specialist from Oea
- Euphrasia – Wife of Saturninus
- Fidelis – Interpreter
- Hanno – From Sabratha
- Iddibal – Bestiarus
- Myrrha – Punic
- Saturninus – Gladiator's trainer from Lepcis Magna

== Awards and nominations ==
- Winner of the first Ellis Peters Historical Dagger awarded by the Crime Writers' Association in 1999.

== Release details ==
- 1998, UK, Century Hardback ISBN 978-0-7126-7796-7
- 1999, UK, Arrow, Paperback ISBN 978-0-09-979961-0
- 1999, UK, Isis, Audio, ISBN 978-0-7531-0509-2 (read by Christopher Scott)
- 1999, US, Mysterious Press, Hardback ISBN 978-0-89296-693-6
- 2000, US, Mysterious Press, Paperback ISBN 978-0-446-60902-9
