= Desperate Undertaking =

2022 historical crime novel by Lindsey Davis

- Cover of 1st UK hardback edition 2022
- Author: Lindsey Davis
- Series: Flavia Albia
- Genre: historical fiction, crime fiction
- Publisher: Hodder & Stoughton, Minotaur Books
- Publication date: 7 April 2022
- Publication place: UK
- ISBN: 9781529354713
- Preceded by: A Comedy of Terrors
- Followed by: Fatal Legacy

Desperate Undertaking is a historical crime novel by British writer Lindsey Davis, the tenth in her Flavia Albia series. It was published in the UK on 7 April 2022 by Hodder & Stoughton (ISBN 9781529354713) and in the United States on 27 July 2022 by Minotaur Books (ISBN 9781250799883).

The tale is set in Rome in late December 89 AD, set in and around the Field of Mars, and involving murders among the theatrical community. It is divided into parts, of varying lengths, with titles "Laureolus", "Pasiphae", "Oedipus Rex", "Medea", "Selurus the bandit king of Sicily", "Orpheus or possibly Daedalus", "Aeschylus", "Jason" and "The Girl from Londinium".

The cover of the first UK hardback edition shows a damaged bas-relief carving of a seated man contemplating a theatrical mask which he holds in his outstretched hand. The image is of part of "Relief of a seated poet (Menander) with masks of New Comedy, 1st century B.C.–early 1st century A.D.", held by the Princeton University Art Museum. The American cover shows a girl in a white and purple tunic looking towards a Roman theatre while clutching a large dagger.

In a starred review, Publishers Weekly wrote that the novel "reinforces Davis’s place at the top of the Ancient Roman historical subgenre". Kirkus Reviews and the Historical Novel Society also gave favourable reviews.
