= Fatal Legacy =

2023 historical crime novel by Lindsey Davis

- Cover of 1st UK hardback edition 2023
- Author: Lindsey Davis
- Series: Flavia Albia
- Genre: historical fiction, crime fiction
- Publisher: Hodder & Stoughton, Minotaur Books
- Publication date: 6 April 2023
- Publication place: UK
- ISBN: 9781529354737
- Preceded by: Desperate Undertaking
- Followed by: Death on the Tiber

Fatal Legacy is a historical crime novel by British writer Lindsey Davis, the eleventh in her Flavia Albia series. It was published in the UK on 6 April 2023 by Hodder & Stoughton (ISBN 9781529354737) and in the United States on 18 July 2023 by Minotaur Books (ISBN 9781250799906).

The plot, set in Rome in AD 90, involves, amongst other aspects of Roman life: an unpaid bar bill; a missing will and codicil; a rabbit farm; an orchard planted variously with walnuts, apricots and cherries; freed slaves; suspicious deaths; and feuding families with labyrinthine family trees. Before publication, the author wrote: "The joke of this plot is that it is impossible to summarise". It takes place on the Aventine and Caelian hills and at the Forum Romanum.

The cover of the first UK hardback edition shows a pair of shears against a mosaic showing a rabbit. The cover of the first American edition shows a woman holding a large dagger behind her back, and an armoured Roman soldier, inside a building.

Writing in The Globe and Mail, Margaret Cannon called the novel "as light as air and as witty and amusing as Davis’s finest Falco books of yore". Publishers Weekly wrote that it was "more low-key than past entries, but no less gripping", while Kirkus Reviews called it "dark mystery encased in a rich portrait of ancient Rome." The Historical Novel Society also gave a favourable review.
