= See Delphi and Die =

2005 historical crime novel by Lindsey Davis

- First edition cover
- Author: Lindsey Davis
- Language: English
- Series: Marcus Didius Falco
- Genre: Historical mystery crime novel
- Publisher: Century, Mysterious Press
- Publication date: 2005
- Publication place: United Kingdom
- Media type: Print (hardback and paperback)
- Pages: 354 pp (Paperback edition)
- ISBN: 0-312-35775-3
- OCLC: 131428046
- Preceded by: Scandal Takes a Holiday
- Followed by: Saturnalia

See Delphi and Die is a 2005 historical mystery crime novel by English author Lindsey Davis, the 17th book of the Marcus Didius Falco Mysteries series. The audiobook is narrated by Simon Prebble.

Set in Rome and Roman Greece between September and October AD 76, the novel stars Marcus Didius Falco, informer and imperial agent. As with many of the other Falco novels, See Delphi and Die uses a "modern" idea – in this case, the holiday package tour – as a device around which to build the story. The title refers to the deaths which take place at tourist attractions in Ancient Greece, including the sanctuary at Delphi, while paraphrasing Goethe's "See Naples and die", which refers to the grandeur of the capital of the Two Sicilies under the House of Bourbon; it also refers to a quote by one of the characters in the novel, addressed to Falco, as well as summarises the fate of another character.

== Plot summary ==
Through his brother-in-law Aulus, Falco hears details of two young Roman women who have died in Greece while seeing the sights of the ancient world. Falco and his wife, Helena, travel to Greece to meet up with the tour party which included one of the women, seeking clues to her murder, passing through Olympia, Corinth, Delphi and the oracle of Trophonius at Lebadeia before finally arriving at Athens.

The wayward Aulus is playing truant in Greece where, instead of studying law at Athens, he is investigating the death of Valeria Ventidia, a newly married Roman girl at Olympia, as well as another death which occurred three years earlier around the same area. Falco's mission has two objectives: to send Aulus back to school, and solve the mystery behind the deaths at Olympia. Eventually, a connection between the two deceased women is deduced: both had joined tours provided by Seven Sights, a tour company of dubious reputation, currently operating in Greece.

Falco's investigation does not go smoothly, however: the Roman authorities are not interested in properly investigating the deaths (much less governing Greece itself), and at Olympia Falco is attacked by a potential suspect, who later turns up dead in suspicious circumstances, the death blamed on Falco's ward Glaucus. Low on funds and unwilling to be confronted by the angry locals, Falco and his followers – Helena, Albia, Glaucus and Falco's nephews – are forced to leave Olympia for Corinth but not before discovering that Valeria's killer may have been connected to athletes who trained at Olympia.

Things do not look better at Corinth however: the governor is making an extended tour, and his deputy, the quaestor Aquillus Macer, is proven to be extremely inept and inexperienced. Fortunately the tour party has been apprehended at Corinth but worse is still to come: Aulus and Valeria's widower, Tullis Statianus, have run away to Delphi to seek answers from the Oracle there, and another member of the Seven Sights travelling party is murdered. Fearing that Statianus would be the killer's next victim, Falco and Helena rush off to Delphi but lose Statianus, who flees this time to Lebadeia and then disappears without a trace.

Dejected and defeated, Falco and his group travel to Delphi on their original mission: to persuade Aulus to return to studying law at Athens. Falco also gets to meet Aulus' mentor, a formidable lawyer named Minas who offers his aid in capturing the killer – by hosting a party for the Seven Sights tour party, now freed and in Athens too after the operators Phineus and Polystratus managed to threaten the Corinth government with legal action advised by Minas. Falco has no confidence in Minas' methods, but during the course of the party, more evidence is found by Falco and his nephews, revealing that Phineus and Polystratus had athletic training, and that female travellers on Seven Sights may have been sexually harassed by the men. Finally, Polystratus is unmasked as the real killer, and the remains of the missing Statianus are found in a stew he is serving to the party, proving his guilt.

== Major themes ==
- Falco's relations with his in-laws
- An insight into Roman rule in Greece
- Corruption in the classical Olympic Games
- The rise of Falco's nephew, Gaius, as an auctioneer

== Release details ==
- 2005, UK, Century Hardback ISBN 0-7126-2590-9
- 2006, UK, Arrow, Paperback ISBN 0-09-944528-X
- 2006, US, St Martins Press, Hardback ISBN 0-312-35765-6
- 2007, US, St Martins Press, Paperback
