= Pandora's Boy =

2018 historical crime novel by Lindsey Davis

- Cover of 2018 UK first edition
- Author: Lindsey Davis
- Series: Flavia Albia
- Genre: Historical fiction, crime fiction
- Publisher: Hodder & Stoughton, St. Martin's Press
- Publication date: 5 April 2018
- Publication place: UK
- Media type: Print, e-book, audiobook, large print
- Pages: 398
- ISBN: 978-1-4736-5863-9
- Preceded by: The Third Nero
- Followed by: A Capitol Death

Pandora's Boy is a historical crime novel by British writer Lindsey Davis, the sixth in her Flavia Albia series. It was published by Hodder & Stoughton in the UK on 5 April 2018, (ISBN 9781473658745) and in the United States in 2018 by St. Martin's Press.

The tale involves the death of a young girl and during her investigation Albia "has to contend with the occult, organised crime, an unusual fertility symbol, and celebrity dining"; the Pandora of the title is a local witch. The story begins in October AD 89 and is set in Rome, on the Quirinal Hill.

The first edition cover of the UK hardback shows a cracked blue glass bird credited as "vessel shaped like bird" from the Corning Museum of Glass.

Publishers Weekly and Library Journal praised the "close attention to detail", as did Kirkus Reviews, who also praised the "brisk pace" and "colorful cast". On the other hand, Marilyn Sherlock, writing for the Historical Novel Society was "not particularly impressed" and found the novel to "ramble".
