= There Will Be Bodies =

2025 historical crime novel by Lindsey Davis

- Cover of 1st UK hardback edition 2025
- Author: Lindsey Davis
- Series: Flavia Albia
- Genre: historical fiction, crime fiction
- Publisher: Hodder & Stoughton
- Publication date: 3 April 2025
- Publication place: UK
- ISBN: 978-1399719636
- Preceded by: Death on the Tiber
- Followed by: Murder in Purple and Gold

There Will Be Bodies is a historical crime novel by British writer Lindsey Davis, the thirteenth in her Flavia Albia series. It was published in the United Kingdom on 3 April 2025 by Hodder & Stoughton (ISBN 978-1399719636) and in the United States on 22 July 2025 by Minotaur Books (ISBN 978-1250906731).

The book is set in Stabiae, on the Bay of Naples, Italy, in 90AD, ten years after the eruption of Mount Vesuvius. Flavia's husband's uncle has bought a villa there, and while working on its reconstruction Flavia and her husband find the body of its previous owner: not overwhelmed in the eruption but laid out in a locked store room.

The cover of the first UK hardback edition shows a battered sculptured head half-buried in glowing embers. Davis has said that it represents Tyche, goddess of fortune and owner of the first set of dice, wearing a mural crown. The American first edition cover shows a woman with a dagger looking through the atrium of a villa towards a man with his back to her: Vesuvius is visible in the distance.

Neither of Flavia's parents, Falco and Helena, appear in the "List of characters".

On 1 April 2025, two days before publication date, Davis reported that she had been sent a "review" which had been posted on social media and which completely misrepresented the book. She concluded that it had been created using AI, drawing on assembled information about her earlier works (eg specifying the setting as Rome, because many of them were set there). She commented on Facebook on 2 April: "Never fear, he took it down".
