= Lindsey Davis =

English novelist (born 1949)

- Born: 1949 (age 76–77); Birmingham, England
- Occupation: novelist
- Writing career
- Period: 1989–present
- Genre: Historical crime fiction
- Notable works: Marcus Didius Falco series, Flavia Albia series
- Website: www.lindseydavis.co.uk

Lindsey Davis (born 1949) is an English historical novelist, best known as the author of the Falco series of historical crime stories set in ancient Rome and its empire. She has received the Cartier Diamond Dagger award.

== Life and career ==
Davis was born in Birmingham. After taking a degree in English literature at Oxford University (Lady Margaret Hall), she became a civil servant for 13 years. When a romantic novel she had written was runner up for the 1985 Georgette Heyer Historical Novel Prize, she moved toward a career in writing, at first creating romantic serials for the UK women's magazine Woman's Realm. One of these, The Bride from Bithynia, was published in her 2023 collection Voices of Rome.

Her dedication of the book Rebels and Traitors (2009) reads: "For Richard / dearest and closest of friends / your favourite book / in memory", and the author's website relates: "I am still getting used to life without my dear Richard. For those of you who haven't seen this before, he died in October [2008]." The author says in her publisher's newsletter: "The greatest recommendation I can give is that Richard, its first reader, thought it wonderful. He devoured chunks, demanding ‘Bring more story!’ even when he was in hospital. One of the last things I was ever able to tell him was that Rebels and Traitors was to be published by Random House, so I would be working with dear friends for his favourite book."

Davis suffered from the eye condition keratoconus from childhood, and in adulthood had a corneal transplant, about which she has said: "A stranger's generosity freed me from years of pain and anxiety" and urges her readers to carry a donor card.

== Writing ==
Davis's interest in history and archaeology led to her writing a historical novel about Vespasian and his lover Antonia Caenis (The Course of Honour), for which she could not find a publisher. She tried again, and her first novel featuring the Roman "detective", Marcus Didius Falco, The Silver Pigs (1989), set in the same time period, was the start of her career as a writer of historical whodunnits. A further 19 Falco novels have followed, as well as The Course of Honour, which was published in 1997. She published Falco: The Official Companion in June 2010.

Rebels and Traitors, set in the period of the English Civil War, was published in September 2009.

Master and God, published in March 2012, is set in ancient Rome and concerns the emperor Domitian.

In 2012, Davis and her publishers, Hodder & Stoughton in the UK and St. Martin's Press in the US, announced that she was writing a new series of books centred on Flavia Albia, Falco's British-born adopted daughter and "an established female investigator". The first title, The Ides of April was published on 11 April 2013 in the UK, and its sequel, Enemies at Home, was published in 2014, followed by annual additions. In an interview in 2019 Davis discussed her plan to write an Albia novel set on each of the seven hills of Rome, starting with the Aventine Hill in the book The Ides of April and culminating with the Capitoline Hill in the book A Capitol Death. By 2022 she had published three more Albia books, set in particular locations just outside the wall of Rome. After two further books in and around Rome, her 13th Flavia Alba book was set near Pompeii, ten years after the eruption of Mount Vesuvius in 79 AD.

Davis has won many literary awards, including, in 2011, the Cartier Diamond Dagger of the Crime Writers' Association given to authors who have made an outstanding lifetime contribution to the genre. She was honorary president of the Classical Association from 1997 to 1998, and is a life member of the Council of the Society of Authors.

== Adaptations ==
Davis's first Falco novel, The Silver Pigs, was loosely adapted in 1993 as Age of Treason. Starring Bryan Brown, Amanda Pays and Anthony Valentine, the screenplay by Lee David Zlotoff bore little resemblance to the original novel, and Davis had her name removed from the credits.

The BBC adapted the first five Falco novels (The Silver Pigs, Shadows in Bronze, Venus in Copper, The Iron Hand of Mars and Poseidon's Gold) as full cast radio dramas starring Anton Lesser as Falco, with Fritha Goodey and Anna Madeley as Helena.

== Published works ==
=== Marcus Didius Falco ===
1. The Silver Pigs (1989)
2. Shadows in Bronze (1990)
3. Venus in Copper (1991)
4. The Iron Hand of Mars (1992)
5. Poseidon's Gold (1993)
6. Last Act in Palmyra (1994)
7. Time to Depart (1995)
8. A Dying Light in Corduba (1996)
9. Three Hands in the Fountain (1997)
10. Two for the Lions (1998)
11. One Virgin Too Many (1999)
12. Ode to a Banker (2000)
13. A Body in the Bath House (2001)
14. The Jupiter Myth (2002)
15. The Accusers (2003)
16. Scandal Takes a Holiday (2004)
17. See Delphi and Die (2005)
18. Saturnalia (2007)
19. Alexandria (2009)
20. Nemesis (2010)

Omnibus editions

- Falco on His Metal (1999)
  - Venus in Copper
  - The Iron Hand of Mars
  - Poseidon's Gold
- Falco on the Loose (2003)
  - Last Act in Palmyra
  - Time to Depart
  - A Dying Light in Corduba

Companion

- Falco: The Official Companion (2010)

=== Flavia Albia ===
1. The Ides of April (2013, Hodder & Stoughton, ISBN 978-1-4447-5581-7)
2. Enemies at Home (2014, Hodder & Stoughton, ISBN 978-1444766585)
3. Deadly Election (2015, Hodder & Stoughton, ISBN 9781444794229)
4. The Graveyard of the Hesperides (2016, Hodder & Stoughton, ISBN 9781473613386)
5. The Third Nero (2017, Hodder & Stoughton, ISBN 9781473613423)
6. Pandora's Boy (2018, Hodder & Stoughton, ISBN 9781473658653)
7. A Capitol Death (2019, Hodder & Stoughton, ISBN 9781473658745)
8. The Grove of the Caesars (2020, Hodder & Stoughton, ISBN 9781529374247)
9. A Comedy of Terrors (2021) (ISBN 9781529374322)
10. Desperate Undertaking (2022, Hodder & Stoughton, ISBN 978-1529354683)
11. Fatal Legacy (2023, Hodder & Stoughton, ISBN 9781529354737)
12. Death on the Tiber (2024, Hodder & Stoughton, ISBN 978-1399719612)
13. There Will Be Bodies (2025, Hodder & Stoughton, ISBN 9781399719636)
14. Murder in Purple and Gold (2026, Hodder & Stoughton, ISBN 9781399747998)
15. Forthcoming: Ghosts of Our Ancestors (1 April 2027, Hodder & Stoughton, ISBN 978-1399748032)
16. Forthcoming: The Titan's Apprentice (13 April 2028, Hodder & Stoughton, ISBN 978-1399767521)

=== Other works set in ancient Rome ===
Novels

- The Course of Honour (1997)
- Master and God (2012)

Novellas

- The Spook Who Spoke Again (2015, ebook and audio only, ISBN 9781473617001)
- Vesuvius by Night (2017, ebook and audio only, ISBN 9781473658851)
- Invitation to Die (2019, ebook and audio only, ASIN B07L31RZ4G)

Novella collection

- Voices of Rome: Four Stories of Ancient Rome (2023, Hodder & Stoughton:ISBN 9781399721332) comprising The Bride from Bithynia, The Spook Who Spoke Again, Vesuvius by Night, and Invitation to Die

=== English Civil War ===
- Rebels and Traitors (2009)
- A Cruel Fate (3 February 2014, Hodder & Stoughton: ISBN 9781444763188), (a QuickRead set in the English Civil War)

=== Short story ===
- "'Going Anywhere Nice?'" (2005), published in The Detection Collection, edited by Simon Brett.

== Awards and nominations ==
- Shortlisted for the Georgette Heyer Prize for two unpublished works (pre-Falco).
- Winner of the Author's Club Prize for "Best First Novel" in 1989 for The Silver Pigs.
- Winner of the Crime Writers' Association (CWA): Dagger in the Library for being an author "whose work has given most pleasure" in 1995. "The Dagger in the Library". CWA. Archived from the original on 14 May 2012.
- Winner of the first Ellis Peters Historical Dagger awarded by the Crime Writers' Association in 1999 for Two for the Lions."The Ellis Peters Historical Award". Archived from the original on 7 November 2013.
- Winner of the Sherlock Award for the Best Comic Detective in 2000 for Didius Falco.
- Awarded the 2010 Premio Colosseo, awarded by the city of Rome to someone who "has enhanced the image of Rome in the world"
- Winner of the 2011 Cartier Diamond Dagger from the Crime Writers' Association
- Winner in 2013 of the first Barcelona Historical Novel Prize (Premi Internacional de Novella Històrica Barcino)
