= A Body in the Bath House =

2001 novel by Lindsey Davis

- First edition
- Author: Lindsey Davis
- Language: English
- Series: Marcus Didius Falco
- Genre: Historical fiction crime novel
- Publisher: Century
- Publication date: 2001
- Publication place: United Kingdom
- Media type: Print (hardback and paperback)
- Pages: 352 pp (Hardback edition)
- ISBN: 0-7126-7854-9
- OCLC: 47675102
- Preceded by: Ode to a Banker
- Followed by: The Jupiter Myth

A Body in the Bath House is a 2001 historical mystery crime novel by Lindsey Davis and the 13th book of the Marcus Didius Falco Mysteries series. Set in Rome and Britannia in AD 75, the novel stars Marcus Didius Falco, informer and imperial agent. The title refers to the discovery of a corpse hidden beneath the floor of one bath house and a murder which takes place in another. American editions spell "bathhouse" in the title as one word.

== Plot summary ==
When Marcus Didius Falco discovers a corpse hidden under the floor of his new bath house, he starts to track down the men responsible – Glaucus and Cotta. He also receives a commission from the Emperor Vespasian. A building project for the British Chieftain Togidubnus is running late and over-budget. The first phase of construction had gone smoothly – the first buildings on site were granaries, providing a supply base for the Roman army, constructed in the early part of the conquest. But progress had stalled on the stone-walled house and bath suite that would be Togidubnus's residence. Suspecting that the men he seeks have fled to Britain, Falco accepts the mission and travels there with his wife, two baby daughters, their nurse, and his two brothers-in-law Aelianus and Justinus.

Falco arrives at Fishbourne and starts by investigating corrupt practices. However events quickly take a turn for the worse when the Chief Architect is found murdered in the bath-house of the British King. Falco takes over the project and investigates the killings.

== Characters ==
=== In Rome ===
- Aulus Camillus Aelianus – Younger brother of Helena
- Anacrites – Chief Spy
- Camilla Hyspale – Nursemaid to Julia and Favonia
- Marcus Didius Geminus – Father of Falco, Auctioneer
- Glaucus and Cotta – Bath House Contractors
- Sosia Favonia – Daughter of Falco and Helena
- Helena Justina – Wife of Falco, and daughter of the Senator Decimus Camillus Verus
- Julia Junilla Laeitana – Daughter of Falco and Helena
- Lucius Petronius Longus – Friend of Falco and Vigiles Officer
- Maia Favonia – Falco's widowed sister
- Marcus Didius Falco – Informer and Imperial Agent.
- Perella – Dancer and Spy
- Quintus Camillus Justinus – Younger brother of Aelianus
- Vespasian – Emperor of Rome

=== In Britain ===
- Alexas – Doctor
- Blandus – Painter
- Cyprianus – Clerk of Works
- Gaius – Clerk
- Lupus – Overseas labour force supervisor
- Magnus – Surveyor
- Mandumerus – Local labour force supervisor
- Marcellinus – Retired Architect
- Milchato – Marble Mason
- Philocles – Mosaicist
- Plancus – Assistant Architect
- Pomponius – Project Manager
- Rectus – Draining Engineer
- Sextius – Mechanical statue-seller
- Strephon – Assistant Architect
- T. Claudius Togidubnus – Great King of the Britons
- Timagenes – Gardener
- Verovolcus – Briton working for Togidubnus
- Virginia – Barmaid

== Major themes ==
- Investigation into corruption at the building of a palace of an influential Roman ally.
- The obsessive pursuit of Maia by Anacrites.
- Falco's induction of his brothers-in-law as his investigative associates

== Allusions/references to history ==
- Set in Rome and Britannia, in AD 75, during the reign of Emperor Vespasian.
- Fishbourne Roman Palace, in the village of Fishbourne in West Sussex, is one of the most important archaeological sites in England.
- Tiberius Claudius Cogidubnus (or Togidubnus) was a 1st-century king of the Regni in early Roman Britain.

== Release details ==
- 2001, UK, Century Hardback ISBN 0-7126-8039-X
- 2002, UK, Arrow, Paperback ISBN 0-09-929830-9
- UK, Chivers/BBC AudioBooks, read by Christian Rodska, Cassettes ISBN 0-7540-9769-2 CD audios ISBN 1-4056-7048-7
- UK, Isis, Large Print ISBN 0-7531-6612-7
- 2002, US, Mysterious Press, Hardback (A Body in the Bathhouse) ISBN 0-89296-771-4
- US, Mysterious Press, Paperback (A Body in the Bathhouse) ISBN 0-446-69170-4
