= Ghosts of Our Ancestors =

2027 historical crime novel by Lindsey Davis

- Cover of 1st UK hardback edition 2027
- Author: Lindsey Davis
- Series: Flavia Albia
- Genre: historical fiction, crime fiction
- Publisher: Hodder & Stoughton
- Publication date: 1 April 2027
- Publication place: UK
- ISBN: 9781399748032
- Preceded by: Murder in Purple and Gold
- Followed by: The Titan's Apprentice (2028)

Ghosts of Our Ancestors is a historical crime novel by British writer Lindsey Davis, the fifteenth in her Flavia Albia series, expected to be published in April 2027.

As of October 2026 the page about the book on author's website bears only the words "Never work for family!", and the Human Authored certification from the Authors Guild. The publisher's website tells that the plot involves the festival of Lemuria, visiting relations from Britain, and the decades-old alleged poisoning of a family member.

The cover of the UK hardback edition shows the head of a snake twined round the top of a staff, in the style of the rod of Asclepius, in hammered silver-coloured metal against a dark blue textile.
