= One Virgin Too Many =

1999 novel by Lindsey Davis

- First edition
- Author: Lindsey Davis
- Language: English
- Series: Marcus Didius Falco
- Genre: Historical mystery crime novel
- Publisher: Century
- Publication date: 1999
- Publication place: United Kingdom
- Media type: Print (hardback and paperback)
- Pages: 292 pp
- ISBN: 0-7126-7702-X
- OCLC: 267166145
- Preceded by: Two for the Lions
- Followed by: Ode to a Banker

One Virgin Too Many is a 1999 historical mystery crime novel by Lindsey Davis and the 11th book of the Marcus Didius Falco Mysteries series. Set in Rome between 27 May and 7 June AD 74, the novel stars Marcus Didius Falco, informer and imperial agent. The title refers to the Vestal Virgins lottery that is a key plot device.

== Plot summary ==
When a frightened child approaches Marcus Didius Falco with a plea for help, he does not believe her. One quarrel with the family does not mean that a relation is trying to kill her. Beset by his own family troubles, his new responsibilities as Procurator of the Sacred Poultry, and the continuing search for a new partner, he decides to send her home.

However, he almost immediately regrets it. Gaia Laelia comes from a pre-eminent Roman family with a long history of key religious positions. Gaia, herself, is considered the most likely candidate for election to the office of Vestal Virgin. When she disappears, Falco is officially asked to investigate.

Meanwhile, Helena's brother Aelianus has problems of his own. In an attempt to restart his political career – stalled by his younger brother's elopement with his wealthy fiancee – he tries to gain election to the Arval Brethren. During the night-time ceremonies, however, Aelianus stumbles across the body of one of the Brethren with his throat cut as if he had been sacrificed.

Unable to bring in the Vigiles, Falco is forced to search the house of Gaia Laelia alone, aware that time is running out for finding her before the lottery takes place, or even alive.

== Characters ==
- A. Camillus Aelianus – Older brother of Helena
- Anacrites – Chief Spy
- Ariminius Modullus – Priest
- Athene – Gaia's nursemaid
- Berenice – Queen of Judaea and lover of Titus
- Caecilia Paeta – Mother of Gaia
- Cloelia – Maia's daughter
- Constantia – Vestal Virgin
- Decimus Camillus Verus – Father of Helena, Aulus and Justinus
- Fabius – Falco's uncle
- Gaia Laelia – Wannabe Vestal Virgin
- Geminus – Father of Falco, Auctioneer
- Glaucus and Cotta – Bath House Contractors
- Helena Justina – Wife of Falco, and daughter of the Senator Decimus Camillus Verus
- Julia Junilla – Daughter of Falco and Helena
- Junilla Tacita – Mother of Falco
- Laelius Scaurus – Father of Gaia
- Laelius Numentinus – Priest
- Lucius Petronius Longus – Friend of Falco and Vigiles Officer
- Maia Favonia – Falco's widowed sister
- Marcus Didius Falco – Informer and Imperial Agent.
- Marius – Maia's son
- Meldina – Freewoman
- Q. Camillus Justinus – Younger brother of Helena
- Rubella – Tribune of the Fourth Cohort of Vigiles
- Rutilius Gallicus – Ex-consul
- Statilia Laelia – Aunt of Gaia
- Terentia Paulla – Ex-Vestal Virgin
- Titus Caesar – Son of Vespasian
- Ventidius Silanus – Arval Brother
- Vespasian – Emperor of Rome

== Major themes ==
- Investigation into the disappearance of a young girl who is expected to be the next Vestal.
- Investigation into the murder of one of the Arval Brethren.

== Allusions/references to actual history, geography and current science ==
- Set in Rome in AD 74, during the reign of Emperor Vespasian.
- In Ancient Rome, the Vestal Virgins (sacerdos Vestalis), were the virgin holy priestesses of Vesta, the goddess of the hearth. Their primary task was to maintain the sacred fire of Vesta. The Vestal duty brought great honour and afforded greater privileges to women who served in that role. They were the only female priests within the Roman religious system.
- The Arval Brethren (Latin: Fratres Arvales) were a body of priests in ancient Rome who offered annual sacrifices to lares and gods to guarantee good harvests. The modern world knows them mainly for their stone-carved records of their oaths, rituals and sacrifices.

== Release details ==
- 1999, UK, Century Hardback ISBN 0-7126-7702-X
- 2000, UK, Arrow, Paperback ISBN 0-09-979971-5
- UK, Chivers/BBC AudioBooks, read by Christopher Scott, ISBN 0-7531-0770-8
- 2000, UK, Isis, Large Print ISBN 0-7531-6308-X
- 2000, US, Mysterious Press, Hardback ISBN 0-89296-716-1
- US, Mysterious Press, Paperback ISBN 0-446-67769-8
