= The Graveyard of the Hesperides =

2016 historical crime novel by Lindsey Davis

- Cover of 2016 UK hardcover, First Edition
- Author: Lindsey Davis
- Language: English
- Series: Flavia Albia (Falco: The New Generation) Mysteries
- Genre: historical mystery crime novel
- Publisher: Hodder & Stoughton
- Publication date: 14 April 2016
- Publication place: United Kingdom
- Media type: Print (Hardcover)
- ISBN: 978-1-4736-1336-2
- Preceded by: Enemies at Home
- Followed by: The Third Nero

The Graveyard of the Hesperides is a 2016 historical mystery crime novel by Lindsey Davis and the fourth book in the Flavia Albia (Falco: The New Generation) Mysteries series. (It will be published in the UK on 14 April 2016, by Hodder & Stoughton, and in the US in July 2016, under the title Graveyard of the Hesperides (omitting the initial "The"), by St. Martin's Press.) The novel stars Flavia Albia, the British-born adopted daughter of Marcus Didius Falco (the hero of the author's 20-volume Marcus Didius Falco Mysteries series, published from 1989 to 2010). Albia, a widow, works as a "delatrix" (a detective or private informer) in ancient Rome, like Falco.

The cover of the UK hardback edition has an image of a golden apple with a silver leaf, resting on a marble surface with a few drops of what appears to be blood, and it carries the strapline: "A Flavia Albia Novel". The American hardback edition has a colourful image of a woman walking away between classical columns.

The plot features sex workers, bones, wedding planners and lentils.

In Greek mythology, the Garden of the Hesperides is the garden of the goddess Hera in which grew golden apples, including that which started the Trojan War. In this novel, it is also the name of a run-down bar in ancient Rome, which Flavia's lover Manlius Faustus starts to renovate until human remains are found in the garden.
