= Falco: The Official Companion =

Book by Lindsey Davis

First edition (publ. Century)

Falco: The Official Companion is a 2010 book by English writer Lindsey Davis, which accompanies her 20 historical crime novels about Marcus Didius Falco, a private eye in Ancient Rome. It was published by Century, ISBN 978-1846056734.

Davis says in the introduction:

I won't create a comprehensive encyclopedia of every character, place, murder weapon, stuffed vineleaf and cockroach in the books. ... My intention is to shed light on how the books are written, why I tackle particular subjects, and what I believe to be important in portraying my characters."

The book is not an A-Z guide but a thematic account of many aspects of the background to the series, with sections including: "Falco's relatives", "Lindsey's favourite Roman places", "Praetorians, Urbans and Vigils", "Roman names: the trianomina" and "Where next for Falco?".
