= Contubernium =

Quasi-marital relationship involving slaves

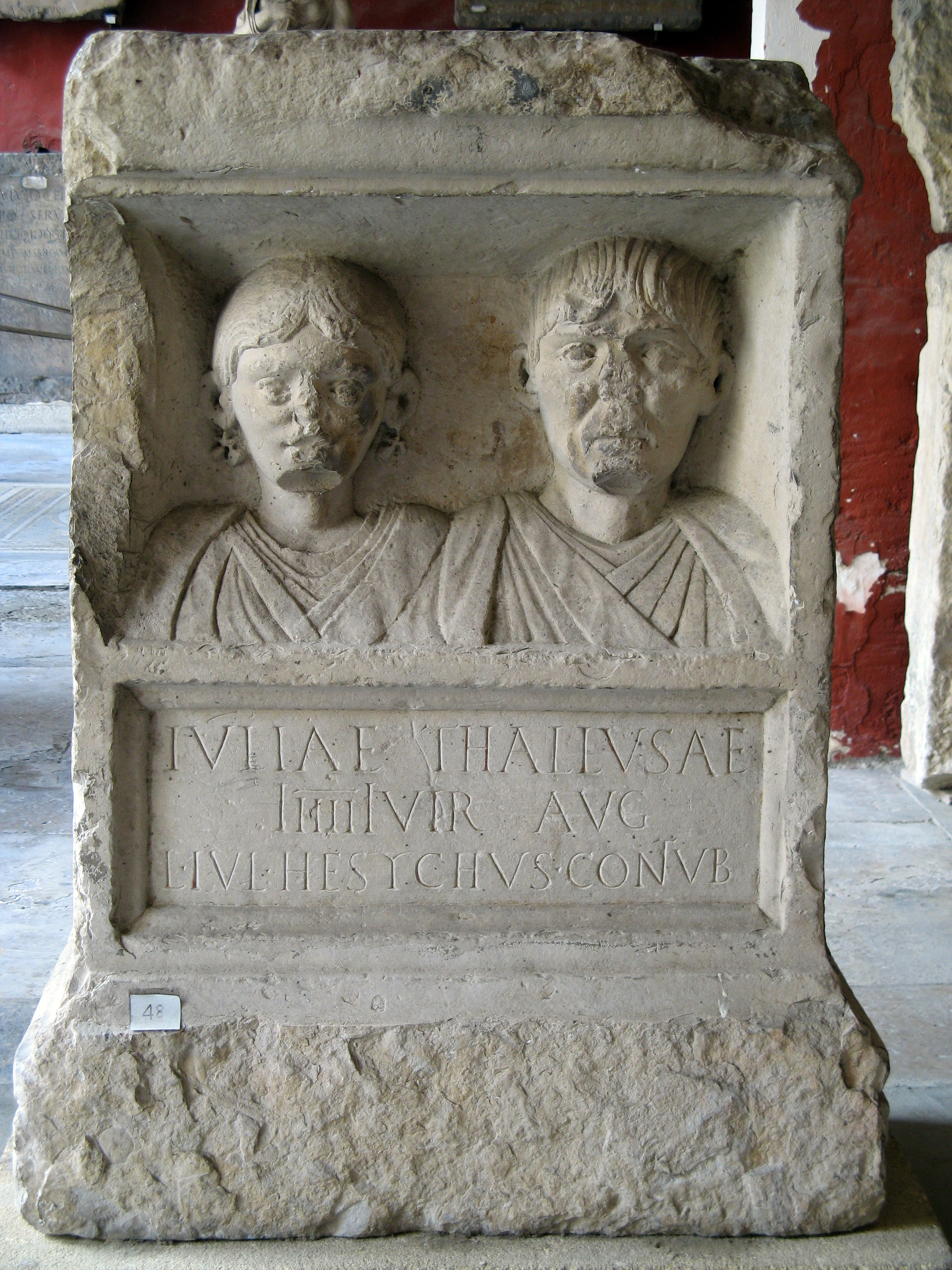
Funerary monument set up by Iulia Thallusa for herself and her contubernalis, the sevir augustalis Lucius Iulius Hesychus (2nd century CE, Musée de la Romanité, Nîmes)

In ancient Rome, contubernium was a quasi-marital relationship between two slaves or between a slave (servus) and a free person who was usually a former slave or the child of a former slave. A slave involved in such a relationship was called contubernalis, the basic and general meaning of which was "companion". (Note: Contubernalis originally meant "tent-mate" in the army, and was also used in this sense for slave "messmates" of the same sex.)

Under Roman law, the slave was treated as property (res) and lacked the legal personhood to enter into legitimate forms of marriage. Although not codified as marriage (conubium) in Roman law, contubernium had legal implications that were addressed by Roman jurists in case law and was intended to be a lasting, ideally permanent union modelled on marital affection (affectio maritalis) that was approved and recognized by the slave's owner. Inscriptions indicate that contubernium with the intentions it expressed was primarily a concern for "upwardly mobile" slaves and former slaves who served the imperial house (familia Caesaris) and bureaucracy or who belonged to houses of senatorial or equestrian rank. In contubernium when only one partner remained enslaved, most often the free person was a freedwoman (liberta).

Contubernium institutionalized the slave's honorable intention to form an enduring heterosexual union with economic, emotional, and parental benefits—an acknowledgment of the inherent contradictions between the status of the slave as property and "tool" (instrumentum) and the individual's evident humanity and desire to participate in what Romans regarded as normal family life.

== The contubernalis ==
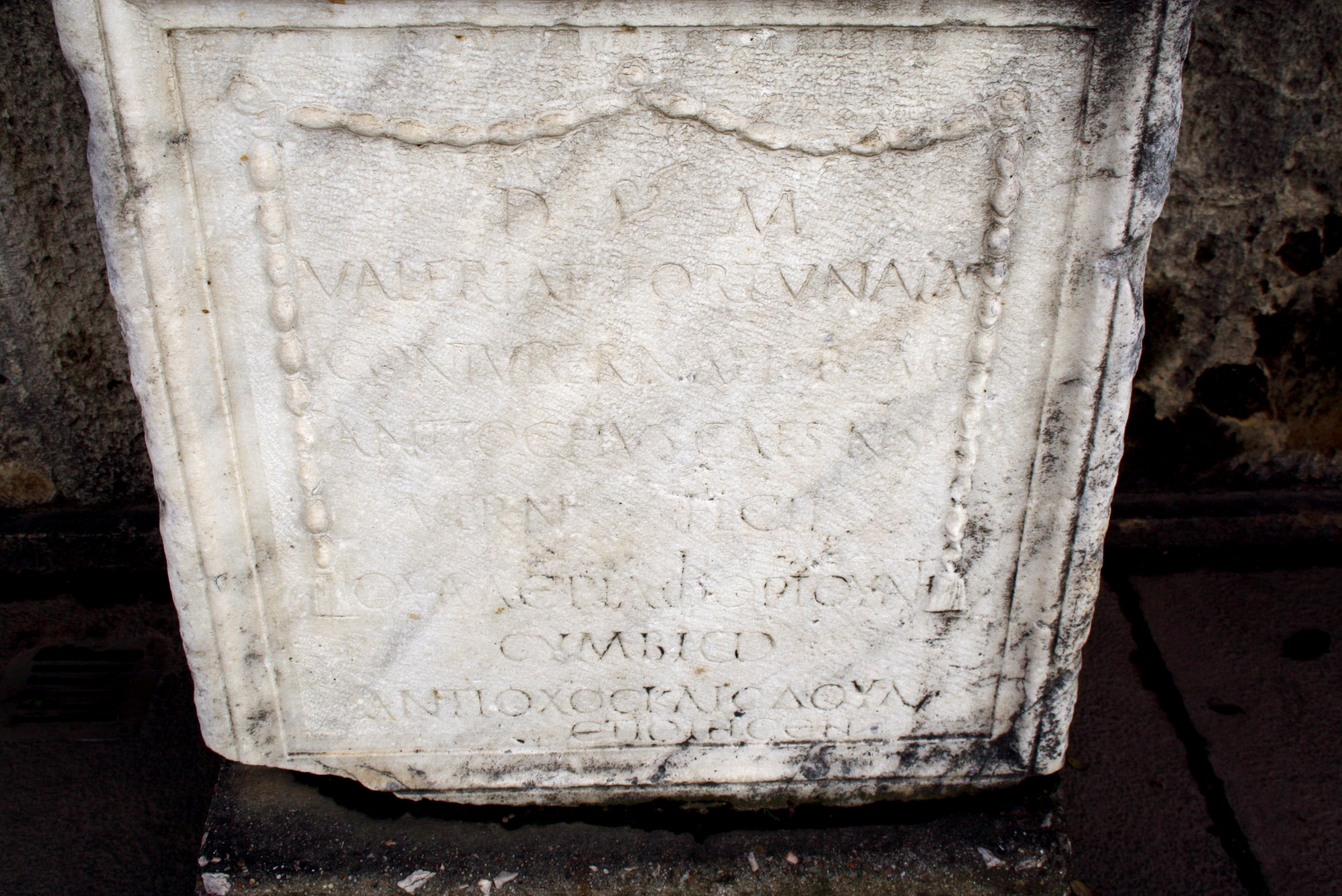
An imperial slave named Antiochus, reared as a verna (within the household he was born into), commemorated the death of his "well-deserving" contubernalis Valeria Fortunata in this Latin-Greek bilingual inscription, found along the Stoa of Attalus

The word contubernalis seems sometimes to have been used as an enduring term of endearment even after a formerly enslaved couple achieved a legal status that allowed them to marry formally.

Men who commemorate the death of a female partner set up epitaphs for a contubernali bene merenti ("to a well deserving companion"), carissimae ("dearest"), piissimae or pientissimae ("most devoted"), optimae ("best"), incomparabili ("incomparable"), rarissimae ("most rare"), sanctissimae ("most sacred"), and dulcissimae ("sweetest"). Women also use many of these descriptors for the male partner they lost, and the same adjectives are used in epitaphs for spouses who had legal marriages.

== Between two slaves ==
Roman law regarded the slave as property; slaves lacked legal personhood and therefore could not enter into contracts on their own behalf, including legally sanctioned forms of marriage (conubium). Some slaves, however, were permitted or encouraged to form family units—permanent heterosexual unions within which "natural children" (liberi naturales) might be reared as vernae. Roman jurists themselves when discussing case law sometimes refer to unions involving slave contubernales with terms for "husband" and "wife". In inscriptions, most contubernales whose status can be identified are slaves, though liberti and libertae (freedpersons) are also frequent. Although a slave lacked legal standing to contract a marriage recognized by Roman law, slaves who came from outside Italy would have their own marriage rites and customs, and there was no prohibition against slaves considering themselves married by custom in this way.

On a country estate (villa), a male slave who had proven his reliability might have license to cohabit with a fellow female slave (conserva). The agricultural writer Columella says that contubernium is particularly desirable for the vilicus, the bailiff or overseer of a farm, who was often but not always a slave or former slave. Any children born from these unions would increase the master's wealth. Vernae, slaves who had been born and reared within the household of their enslaved mother, were themselves more likely to be allowed to cohabit as a couple and to rear their own children. Inscriptions reinforce the impression that contubernium was a privilege extended to slaves whose work at higher-skill jobs was valued.

It was possible for contubernium to exist between two slaves with different owners, but the clearest evidence occurs within a household. During most of the Republican and Imperial eras, free Roman women had the right as citizens to own property and retained their property rights within marriage. The mistress of the house would have her own staff, and many of the household's female slaves are likely to have been hers. Documented examples of couples in which each is affiliated with a different gens (extended family or clan) suggest that the two slaves might still belong to the same household or estate, one in the possession of the male head of household as dominus and the other of his wife as domina.

Contubernium thus was normally a cohabiting relationship between two slaves within the same household. In the records kept by well-to-do families concerned with lineage, the contubernia of slaves were acknowledged along with family births, deaths, and manumissions. Arranged marriage was common among Romans of any status, and at least some contubernia would have been arranged by the owner. A Greek novel of the 2nd century AD has a fictional domina forcing a slave girl she's jealous of to serve as the wife of an enslaved goatherd. The paterfamilias would have retained the right to break up contubernia, just as a father might seek to dissolve the marriage of his son or daughter against their will, but the agricultural writers in particular thought that an attachment to family and home made workers more stable and productive. When cases about breaking up families came to juridical attention, the jurists tended toward keeping spouses, parents and children, and even siblings together. But neither the protections nor liabilities of Roman law on marriage applied to contubernales; for example, a contubernalis could not be prosecuted for adultery.

== Between a free woman and a male slave ==
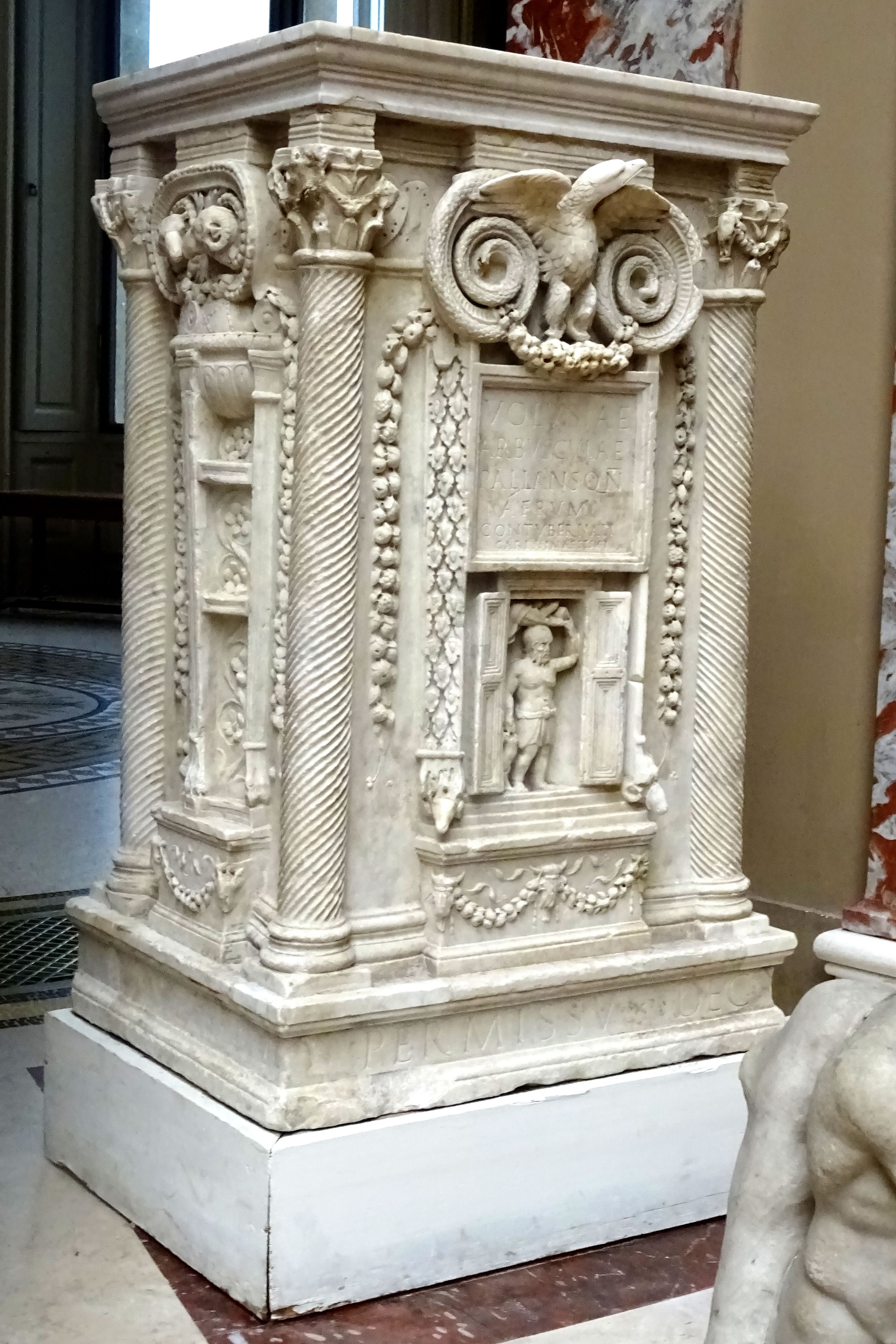
Funerary altar of the freedwoman Volusia Arbuscula (CIL 6.9424, latter 1st century AD), the contubernalis carissima of Pallans, slave of the consul Q. Volusius Saturninus, from the columbarium of the Volusii along the Appian Way, on display at the Musée Condé, Chantilly

The jurists of the Digest tend to use the term contubernalis in the context of a marital union between two slaves that is acknowledged by the owner. In practice, the 260 contubernia recorded in inscriptions from the city of Rome (CIL vol. 6), analyzed by Susan Treggiari, show that in this form of quasi-marriage, while most common between two slaves or two former slaves, one partner could be free and the other not. Among the contubernia between a slave and a free person, most often it was the woman who was free, and the male was the slave. There were several scenarios in which this arrangement could be advantageous to the female or male partner or both.

Since legally binding manumission came with automatic citizenship and the legal status of a child was determined by the mother's, children born from contubernium between a male slave and a freedwoman were themselves free citizens. If she remained a slave, their children would be born into slavery even if later manumission was granted to one or both parents. Some slaves earned money by managing a fund or property (peculium), and certain lucrative financial positions, such as the dispensator who managed a wealthy household, were staffed by slaves for legal reasons. "Upwardly mobile" slaves who served in the imperial bureaucracy also could expect to accumulate wealth and were regularly manumitted in their early thirties. Although women served in the imperial household as well, the highest positions in financial services were held by male slaves. Under these circumstances, a slave might retain the earning power of his job and arrange to use his peculium to pay for the manumission of his contubernalis instead of himself. In such cases, the wife might act as the functional head of the household because as a free person she had the right to own property.

As another example, a woman born into first-generation freedom as the daughter of a successful freedman might have limited prospects for finding a financially secure husband of compatible social standing. Contubernium with an imperial slave, who reasonably expected to be manumitted between the ages of 30 and 35 in possession of a certain amount of wealth, might be attractive, allowing her to start a family during her childbearing years before he completed his service; their children would be born illegitimate (spurii) (Note: The spurius child was one whose paternity could not be identified; a slave's lack of legal personhood meant that he lacked the standing to assert patriarchal potestas, and thus he could not be a father in the strictly legal sense, just as he could not be a lawful husband. The freeborn child fathered by a slave was therefore born sui iuris. If the male partner was later manumitted, it's possible that he would adopt his own child, but retroactive legitimation does not seem to have been enabled until late antiquity, under Justinian.) but free. In most contubernia between a male slave and a free woman, both partners are from imperial slave families—the wife being either a liberta of the imperial house or the daughter of an imperial freedman.

In one case, a domina had given (Note: The action of giving is expressed by the participle tradita ("handed over", "traded", or "sold") to describe the pedisequa, which may indicate that she was entrusted to the actor, himself a slave, in the same way that he could hold but not own other forms of property as his peculium.) one of her female slaves (pedisequae, "footwomen") to her business manager (actor) to serve as his wife; the relationship is specified as a contubernium. When the domina died, she freed all the pedisequae in her possession by the terms of her will, and the court ruled that the bequest of freedom applied also to the wife of the actor, whose status is not noted. Actores were typically slaves, and if this actor had been bequeathed as part of the estate and not also manumitted, the couple would have had unequal status in which only the wife was free.

In all these examples, once both partners were manumitted and held citizen status, they could enter into one of the legally recognized forms of marriage and exercise their rights. For instance, slaves lacked the right to make a will; property they had accumulated went to their master if they died enslaved, and if a freedman died intestate, his former owner as his patron had a claim on his property. By using the right to bequeath their property to their children, freedpersons could begin to build generational wealth.

=== Contubernium without approval ===
A senatus consultum of Claudius in AD 52 addressed sexual relationships between free women and male slaves of another owner. The legislation, drafted by Claudius's freedman Pallas, seems to have been motivated by unapproved cohabitation between imperial slaves and women from outside the familia Caesaris, and the ambiguous status of children produced by such a union. If the slave's owner did not approve of his male slave's relationship with a free woman, he could demand that it end. If three such demands were ignored, he had the right to take possession of the woman as his own property, and any children the couple had became his slaves.

The edict may have been primarily directed at contubernales when the freedwoman held only Latin rights, but it was remarkable for two reasons. Contrary to the ius gentium, the child's status was in effect determined by the father's. And a freeborn woman (ingenua) who consorted with someone else's male slave could gain the owner's approval but would be reduced to the status of freedwoman (liberta)—the only known instance of Roman law that gave a person the socio-legal status of former slave without having been a slave. A further refinement of the decree under the emperor Vespasian was that a liberta who entered into a contubernium with a male slave without the consent of his owner or her patron not only could be re-enslaved by her former master but was denied the hope of citizenship from a second manumission. (Note: Scholars have debated whether the wording of the decree prohibited her acquisition of citizenship only if manumitted by the owner who had re-enslaved her. If she passed into the possession of a different Roman citizen, it's possible that this master could free her with the usual conferral of citizenship. It may also be that she gained only Latin rights if manumitted, or that she was permanently barred from obtaining citizenship and became in effect a dediticia, one who was technically free but held no rights of citizenship.) Constantine I decreed that the offspring of a freeborn woman and a slave serving in the imperial treasury would hold only Latin rights if freed.

No law against contubernium between a free woman and a slave she owned is known until the 4th century AD, but the Romans generally disapproved of relationships in which the female partner was of higher social status than the male. Inscriptions indicate that most often contubernium between a free woman and someone else's slave occurred when the female partner was herself a former slave or the child of former slaves. When a woman was in a position to free a slave and to become first his patrona and then his wife in legal marriage, the slave most likely had been bequeathed to a liberta in a will with an awareness or intention that the couple would marry, or she had purchased her contubernalis and manumitted him. A freedman was not supposed to marry his deceased patron's wife or daughter; the punishment as specified in the Sententiae Pauli (late 3rd or early 4th century) was condemnation to hard labor.

== Between a free man and a female slave ==
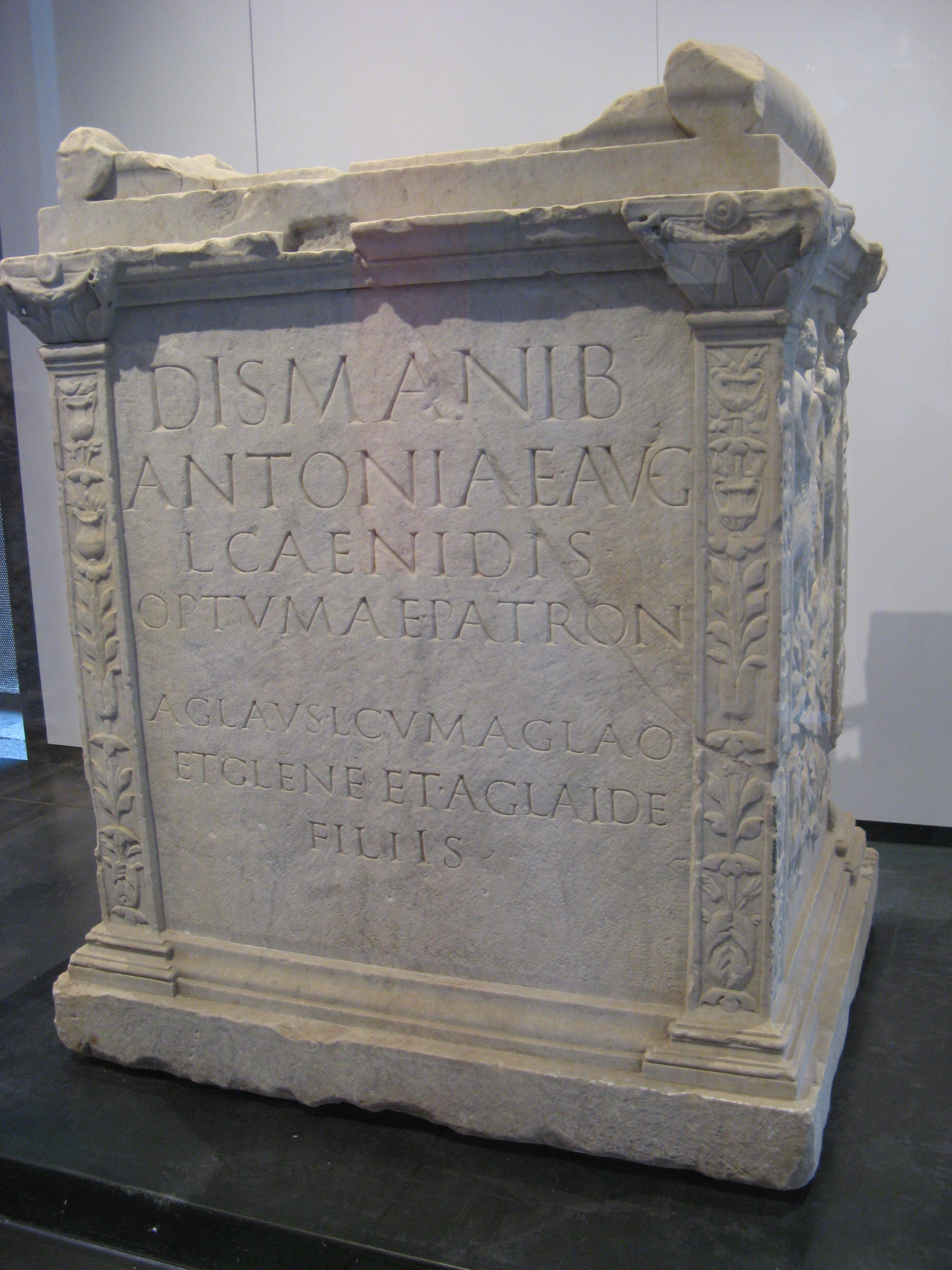
Inscription commemorating Caenis, described by the historian Suetonius as the "almost wife" of Vespasian

Among the 260 inscriptions from the city of Rome referring to contubernales, there is very little evidence of contubernium between a male partner who can be securely identified as free while the female is still enslaved. The sexual exploitation of female slaves by a slave-owner was not contubernium, which was a relationship meant to serve the purposes of monogamous marriage for those who did not presently possess the citizenship rights that enabled marriage by law (conubium). There was no obstacle to a slave-owner obtaining sexual gratification with no expectation of mutual commitment from his female slave, who was legally his property to use. A free man who wanted to have sex with a female slave belonging to someone else would have to come to an arrangement with the owner just as he would if using any other property he did not own. Because Romans conceived of marriage as a union between a man and a woman who were ideally social equals, the motives for a free man to want a marriage with an enslaved woman would be peculiar to the individual.

The status of children born from sexual relations between a free male and an enslaved female was one consideration in whether or how to marry. If the male participant in the relationship was free but the woman was a slave, their children would be born slaves. Slaves referred to as vernae—those who were born to a slave woman and reared within the familia—were at times the biological children of the paterfamilias, his sons, or other free men of the household, though evidence of this is mostly indirect. Vernae might be brought up and educated as companions to the freeborn children of the house and were more likely to receive privileges such as contubernium and manumission. The father of a verna who had no other heir could manumit the child at his discretion independently of the mother's enslaved status, and heads of household without heirs are known to have left their estate to a favored slave who was also manumitted by the will. If the slave-owner had legitimate heirs, the decision to free a slave whom he had impregnated so that she could bear citizen children would require a motive other than producing an heir.

A widowed or divorced slave-owner who had no heirs and lacked prospects for a desirable wife might turn to a companionable female slave of his household in hope of producing a "natural" heir, manumitting her to circumvent the disadvantage of servile birth. One of the Augustan laws pertaining to marriage prohibited the manumission of a slave under the age of thirty except for freeing a slave woman for the purpose of marriage. A man of senatorial rank would face legal penalties, including degradation of status, if he married a freedwoman (liberta), but monogamous concubinage (concubinatus) was an alternative. Men not of senatorial rank could enter into a legal marriage with libertae, including wealthy men of the equestrian order, though the importance of marriage in securing social and political connections in Rome made a formerly enslaved wife a liability at the highest levels of society. Among the lower ranks, however, many inscriptions record the marriage of a freedwoman and her former owner, who became her patron before he became her husband. Their relationship before legal marriage was not construed as contubernium unless the male partner had been a slave or freedman when it began. A child born from either contubernium with a freedwoman or concubinage would be spurius, free but not legitimate; the child could not make a claim to the estate against legitimate heirs, but the father could make the spurius child legal heir through a will.

Because contubernium expressed a relationship based on mutual affection and contubernalis was used fondly for a dear companion, as in epitaphs of those legally married, common usage is at times looser than juristic. For example, after the death of his wife, Vespasian maintained a relationship with Caenis, the freedwoman and former secretary of Antonia Minor, even when he became emperor as he neared the age of 60, at which time she was around 58. Their relationship began when she was about 20. In his Life of Vespasian, Suetonius calls their union a contubernium but also refers to Caenis as a concubina "almost in place of a legal wife" until her death in AD 74; the inscription commemorating her does not use either term.

As Roman society changed in the later empire, the finer legal distinctions among freeborn people, freedpersons, and slaves began to dissolve. An attempt in AD 331 to retighten law pertaining to contubernium was directed at freeborn men who lived with a female slave, had children with her, and then brought up these children as if they were free without bothering to formally manumit them. Family law under Constantine, the first Christian emperor, was primarily aimed at preserving the privileges of freeborn status (ingenuitas), but at least one law also had the effect of protecting contubernales attached to a property whose family might have been broken up during a change of lease.

=== Between a soldier and a slave woman ===
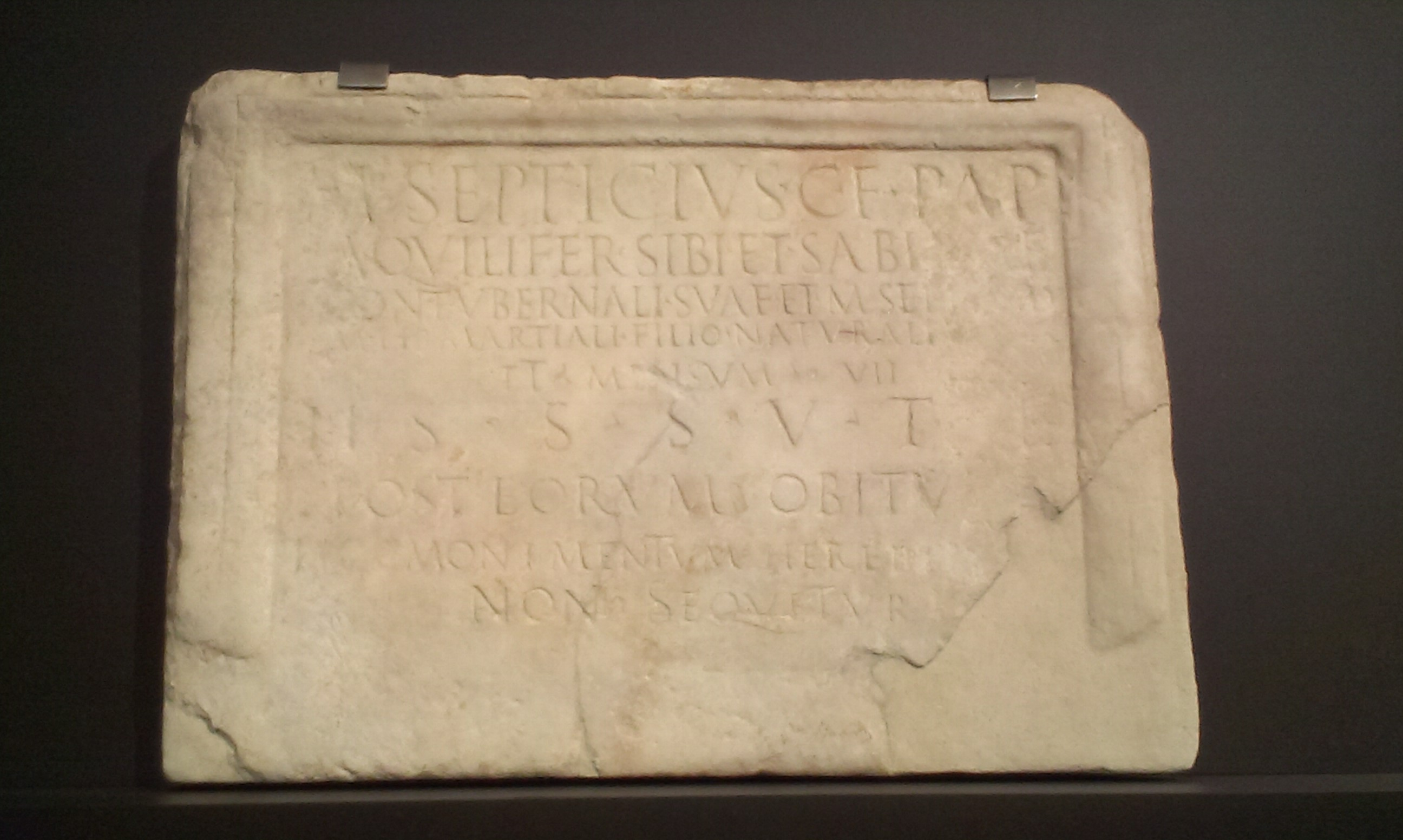
Epitaph for an aquilifer, his contubernalis Sabina, and son Martialis (Museo Arqueológico y Etnológico de Córdoba)

In the provinces, Roman social norms would not be in effect, even for the army. Until AD 213, soldiers serving in the legions were not permitted to marry until they were discharged, placing them in a position rather like that of the imperial slave awaiting an expected or contractually fixed manumission. A soldier who consorted with women who were not supposed to be sexually available to him was subject to prosecution under the Augustan laws of morality that regulated illicit sex (stuprum). The sexual use of a female slave, who as property of the owner had no personhood, was not a sex crime.

Emotional attachments, expressed in epitaphs, letters, and other written media, formed within some of these unequal relationships, and parental approval might be sought. The epitaphs of soldiers in the provinces are often commemorations by their freedwomen, who in some cases are also identified as a legal wife (coniunx). An alternative union such as contubernium with a slave woman or monogamous concubinage with his own freedwoman, mutually agreed upon and perhaps with the approval of the female partner's family, avoided dishonor for the soldier and the woman. Many of these relationships were long-lasting and significant enough to the partners to be commemorated in epitaphs.

One such epitaph was set up in Corduba, Roman Spain, by an aquilifer (legionary standard-bearer) named Marcus Septicius on behalf of himself; his contubernalis, Sabina; and his biological son (filius naturalis) Martialis, who died aged ten years, seven months, as the freedman (libertus) of his own father. When one member of a family died, the funerary inscription sometimes was set up in anticipation of all those who would be entombed together as they died; Martialis, still in childhood, predeceased his father. It can be inferred (though not specifically stated in the epitaph—nontraditional families sometimes shared a tomb) that Sabina is his mother. That she was the slave of Septicius is suggested by the unusualness of manumitting such a young child. As the illegitimate child of a union not recognized as marriage in Roman law, Martialis would not have been an automatic heir to his father's estate, and his father could not have made him a beneficiary of his will if he was still a slave—hence the manumission.

== See also ==
- Inheritance law in ancient Rome
- Marriage in ancient Rome

== Bibliography ==
- Cantarella, Eva (1992). Bisexuality in the Ancient World. Yale University Press. ISBN 978-0-300-04844-5.
- Cantarella, Eva (2015). Istituzioni di diritto romano [Institutions of Roman law] (in Italian). Milan: Arnoldo Mondadori Editore. ISBN 978-8800746083.
- Finley, M. I.; Keith, Emile (1949). "Contubernium". Oxford Classical Dictionary. Oxford University Press. doi:10.1093/acrefore/9780199381135.013.1803. S2CID 165984407.
- Finley, M. I. (2015) [1875]. "Senatusconsultum Claudianum". A Dictionary of Greek and Roman Antiquities. Dictionary of Greek and Roman Antiquities. Cambridge: Cambridge University Press. doi:10.1017/CBO9781139794602. ISBN 9781139794602.
- Grubbs, Judith Evans (2002). Women and the Law in the Roman Empire: A Sourcebook on Marriage, Divorce and Widowhood. Routledge Sourcebooks for the Ancient World. Abingdon, UK: Routledge. ISBN 9781134743926.
- Harper, Kyle (December 2010). "The SC Claudianum in the codex Theodosianus: Social history and legal texts". The Classical Quarterly. 60 (2). Cambridge University Press: 610–638. doi:10.1017/S0009838810000108. S2CID 162980885.
- Hubbard, Thomas K. (2003). Homosexuality in Greece and Rome: A Sourcebook of Basic Documents. University of California Press.
- McGinn, Thomas A. J. (1998). Prostitution, Sexuality and the Law in Ancient Rome. Oxford University Press.
- Rawson, Beryl (1974). "Roman Concubinage and Other De Facto Marriages". Transactions of the American Philological Association. 104. Johns Hopkins University Press: 279–305. doi:10.2307/2936094. JSTOR 2936094.
- Stocquart, Emile (March 1907). Sherman, Charles Phineas (ed.). "Marriage in Roman law". Yale Law Journal. 16 (5). Translated by Bierkan, Andrew T.: 303–327. doi:10.2307/785389. JSTOR 785389.
- Treggiari, Susan (1981). "Contubernales". Phoenix. 35 (1). Classical Association of Canada: 42–69. doi:10.2307/1087137. JSTOR 1087137.
