= Time to Depart =

Book by Lindsey Davis

- First edition
- Author: Lindsey Davis
- Language: English
- Series: Marcus Didius Falco
- Genre: Historical mystery crime novel
- Publisher: Century
- Publication date: 1995
- Publication place: United Kingdom
- Media type: Print (hardback and paperback)
- Pages: 384 pp
- ISBN: 0-71-265931-5
- OCLC: 227274023
- Preceded by: Last Act in Palmyra
- Followed by: A Dying Light in Corduba

Time to Depart is a 1995 historical mystery crime novel by Lindsey Davis and the seventh book of the Marcus Didius Falco Mysteries series. Set in Rome during AD 72, the novel stars Marcus Didius Falco, an informer and imperial agent. The title refers to the law which stated that no Roman citizen who had been sentenced to death might be arrested, even after the verdict, until he has been given time to depart, the idea being that for a Roman citizen to choose exile outside the boundaries of the Empire would have been a fate worse than death itself.

== Plot summary ==
Falco's closest friend, Petronius Longus, has finally caught one of the leading criminals in Rome, Balbinus Pius. But a quirk in Roman law allows a convicted felon, even a murderer, time to depart before the sentence is carried out. Balbinus' departure has left a vacuum in the underworld of Rome, and there is a crowd of criminals trying desperately to fill the void. Their first step is to engineer a robbery that reverberates throughout the city.

Falco is again called upon by the Emperor Vespasian to supply answers, as quietly and quickly as possible. A couple of murders, a kidnapping or two, and more suspects than Falco cares to count takes him, and his patrician girlfriend Helena Justina, to places a family shouldn't have to go.

== Characters ==
=== High Society ===
- Anacrites – Imperial spy
- Camillus Aelianus – Eldest son of Decimus Camillus Verus
- Camillus Justinus – Youngest son of Decimus Camillus Verus
- Decimus Camillus Verus – Senator and father of Helena Justina
- Helena Justina – Daughter of the Senator Decimus Camillus Verus
- Julia Justa – Wife of Camillus Verus and mother of Helena
- T. Claudius Laeta – Imperial clerk
- Titus Caesar – Eldest son of the Emperor
- Vespasian – Emperor

=== Low Society (Fountain Court) ===
- Cassius – Baker
- Castus – Junk-dealer
- Ennianus – Basket-weaver
- Lenia – Laundress
- Marcus Didius Falco – Informer and Imperial Agent from the Aventine.
- Smaractus – Landlord

=== Law and Order ===
- Arica – Member of the Sixth Cohort
- Arria Silvia – Wife of L. Petronius Longus
- Fusculus – Member of Petronius' enquiry team
- L. Petronius Longus – Enquiry chief in the XIII region and friend of Falco
- Marcus Rubella – Tribune of the Fourth Cohort of vigiles
- Martinus – Deputy
- Porcius – Recruit
- Scythax – Doctor
- Sergius – Punishment officer
- Tibullinus – Centurion of the Sixth Cohort

=== Other Citizens ===
- Alexander – Doctor
- Balbinus Pius – Crime boss
- Flaccida – Wife of Balbinus
- Florius – Husband of Milvia
- Lalage – Proprietress of the Bower of Venus
- Little Icarus – Member of Balbinus' Gang
- Macra – Employed at the Bower of Venus
- Milvia – Daughter of Balbinus
- Nonnius Albius – Court witness
- The Miller – Member of Balbinus' Gang

== Major themes ==
- Investigation into the underworld of Roman life,
- Developing relationship of Marcus Didius Falco and Helena Justina.

== Allusions/references to actual history, geography and current science ==
- Set in Rome in AD 72, during the reign of Emperor Vespasian.

== Release details ==
- 1995, UK, Century Hardback (out of print)
- 1996, UK, Arrow, Paperback ISBN 0-09-933881-5
- 1997, UK, Chivers Press, Large Print, ISBN 0-7451-5449-2
- 1997, US, Mysterious Press, Hardback ISBN 0-89296-626-2
- 1998, US, Mysterious Press, Paperback ISBN 0-446-60591-3
- 2003, UK, Arrow, Paperback ISBN 0-09-945199-9 (as part of single-volume omnibus edition, Falco on the Loose, with Last Act in Palmyra and A Dying Light in Corduba)

== Reception ==
Kirkus Reviews described it as "A treat, perhaps, for fans of the period. Heavy going for others."
