= The Accusers =

2003 historical crime novel by Lindsey Davis

- First edition
- Author: Lindsey Davis
- Language: English
- Series: Marcus Didius Falco
- Genre: Historical mystery crime novel
- Publisher: Century
- Publication date: 2003
- Publication place: United Kingdom
- Media type: Print (Hardback & Paperback)
- Pages: 400 pp
- ISBN: 0-71-262556-9
- OCLC: 56441308
- Preceded by: The Jupiter Myth
- Followed by: Scandal Takes a Holiday

The Accusers is a 2003 historical mystery crime novel by Lindsey Davis and the 15th book of the Marcus Didius Falco Mysteries series. Set in Ancient Rome between Autumn AD 75 and Spring AD 76, the novel stars Marcus Didius Falco, informer and imperial agent. The title refers to the role of accusers in bringing the various cases to trial during the course of the story.

== Plot summary ==
Fresh from his trip to Britannia, Marcus Didius Falco needs to re-establish himself back in Rome. A minor role in the trial of a senator entangles him in the machinations of two lawyers: Silus Italicus and Paccius Africanus, both ex-consuls with notorious reputations.

The senator is convicted, but then dies, apparently by suicide. Silius hires Falco and his young associates – Aelianus and Justinus – to prove that it was murder, not an attempt to protect his heirs from further legal action. However, probing this tangle of upper-class secrets leads to fresh prosecutions. Falco finds himself in the role of advocate, exposing himself to powerful elements in Roman law. If he offends the wrong people, it might lead to charges he has not bargained for and ruin his family financially.

== Characters ==
=== Family and associates ===
- Aulus Camillus Aelianus – Elder of Helena's brothers
- Albia – British girl adopted by Helena
- Anacrites – Chief Spy
- Decimus Camillus Verus – Father of Helena
- Geminus – Father of Falco, Auctioneer
- Glaucus – Falco's trainer
- Helena Justina – Wife of Falco, eldest child, and only daughter of the Senator Decimus Camillus Verus
- Julia Junilla and Sosia Favonia – Daughters of Falco and Helena
- Julia Justa – Mother of Helena
- Junia – Falco's sister
- Junilla Tacita – Mother of Falco
- Lucius Petronius Longus – Friend of Falco and Vigiles Officer
- Maia Favonia – Falco's widowed sister
- Marcus Didius Falco – Informer and Imperial Agent
- Quintus Camillus Justinus – Youngest brother of Helena
- Scythax – Vigiles doctor
- Verontius – Falco's brother-in-law

=== From the legal world ===
- Aufustius – Banker
- Biltis – Professional mourner
- Bratta – Informer
- C. Paccius Africanus – Lawyer
- Celadus – Steward
- Claudius Tiasus – Funeral director
- Euboule – Wet-nurse
- Euphanes – Herbalist
- Honorius – Lawyer
- Julius Alexander – Land agent
- Marponius – Judge
- Olympia – Fortune teller
- Perseus – Door porter
- Procreus – Accuser
- Rhoemetalces – Apothecary
- Scorpus – Wills expert
- Spindex – Funeral clown
- Ti Catius Silus Italicus – Lawyer
- Ursulina Prisca – Client
- Zeuko – Daughter of Euboule

== Major themes ==
- The legal machinations of two lawyers.

== Allusions/references to history ==
- Set in Rome in AD 75 and 76, during the reign of Emperor Vespasian.
- Roman law is the legal system of ancient Rome. The development of Roman law covers more than one thousand years from the law of the Twelve Tables (from 449 BC) to the Corpus Juris Civilis of Emperor Justinian I (around 530). Roman law as preserved in Justinian's codes became the basis of legal practice in the Byzantine Empire and—later—in continental Europe.

== Release details ==
- 2003, UK, Century Hardback.ISBN 0-7126-2556-9.
- 2004, UK, Arrow, Paperback. ISBN 0-09-944526-3.
- 2004, US, Mysterious Press, Hardback. ISBN 0-89296-811-7.
