= The Jupiter Myth =

2002 historical mystery crime novel by Lindsey Davis

- First edition
- Author: Lindsey Davis
- Language: English
- Series: Marcus Didius Falco
- Genre: Historical mystery crime novel
- Publisher: Century
- Publication date: 2002
- Publication place: United Kingdom
- Media type: Print (hardback and paperback)
- Pages: 352 pp (Hardback edition)
- ISBN: 0-09-929840-6
- OCLC: 59339341
- Preceded by: A Body in the Bath House
- Followed by: The Accusers

The Jupiter Myth is a 2002 historical mystery crime novel by Lindsey Davis and the 14th book in the Marcus Didius Falco Mysteries series. Set in Londinium, Britannia in August AD 75, the novel stars Marcus Didius Falco, informer and imperial agent. The title refers to the use of Jupiter-related mythology by the crime syndicate to identify businesses associated with them.

Londinium is the setting for two previous Falco novels, The Silver Pigs and A Body in the Bath House. The novel is notable for the introduction of Albia, the young British orphan who becomes Falco's adoptive daughter and is the protagonist of a second novel series by Davis, beginning with The Ides of April.

Davis used up-to-date archaeological knowledge in developing the backdrop to the story.

== Plot summary ==
Despite having put the project of building the palace for the king of the Atrebates, Togidubnus, back on track, there is no peace for Falco and his family (his wife, his children, his brothers in law and his sister Maia Favonia) in Londinium as Togidubnus' disgraced friend, Verovolcus (see A Body in the Bath House), is found drowned in the well of a seedy Londinium taverna named the Shower of Gold, stripped of his torque. Fearful of the diplomatic consequences, the local authorities in the form of Gaius Hilaris (see The Silver Pigs), Falco's old friend and Helena's uncle, urge Falco to take up inquiries into the death. At the same time, Maia's children and Lucius Petronius "Petro'" Longus, Falco's best friend, have appeared in Londinium. Things become more tense with Togidubnus breathing down Falco and Hilarius' necks for answers on who killed Verovolcus, and a newly arrived businessman, Norbanus Murena, hitting on Maia.

Falco and Helena discover extortion rackets terrorising Londinium when a fire breaks out at a bakery. He muses on how suspicious the fire at the bakery is, since there was nobody in the bakery during the conflagration, and suspects that it was arson by whoever is behind the rackets. In the midst of the blaze, a vagrant girl risks her life to save a pack of dogs. Touched by this show of heroism, Helena adopts the girl, who is named Albia. The relationship between the Didii and Albia goes off on a rocky start, however, with Albia vandalising Hilarius' home. Simultaneously Petro' also disappears, and at a very bad time too — a message soon arrives, saying that two of Petro's children have died in Rome. Falco is forced to take Albia out along with him, and decides to look for Petro', but Petro' warns him to stay away because he is going undercover and then flees. Worse, Albia is abducted and forced into a brothel. Falco goes to her rescue and is assisted by an unlikely ally: a group of female gladiators (or gladiatrices) led by an ex-girlfriend of Falco's named Chloris, now going by the stage name of Amazonia. The gladiatrices believe Falco to be responsible for Albia's plight and detain him, but Helena (who was summoned by Albia) convinces them to release Falco. The reunion with Chloris temporarily strains Falco's marriage with Helena, but eventually they reconcile. Enquiries, however, begin to pay off and soon enough, with Chloris' help Falco manages to identify the rackets' enforcers in town, nicknamed Pyro and Splice. Falco and his associates soon notice something else — many of the businesses in town all have names derived from myths surrounding Jupiter, the chief god of the Roman pantheon. Chloris also reveals to Falco that she saw Pyro and Splice up-end Verovolcus into the well, and that whoever is employing them is also harassing her and her gladiatrix group into working for him.

A corpse is found on the wharves and sure enough, it is the missing baker whose shop was torched. Petro contacts Falco and reveals he is on an undercover mission for the vigiles in Rome, tracking whoever is behind the Londinium rackets, and happened to witness the baker's murder (but unfortunately can't identify the perpetrators). After a brief discussion, they decide to arrest Pyro and Splice. As usual, things don't go down well — a lawyer named Popilius attempts to free the enforcers but fails. Pyro is poisoned and Splice manages to escape from custody before any of them can be interrogated by the chief torturer, ironically named Amicus (Latin: 'friend'). Meanwhile, king Togidubnus has managed to detain one of the employees of the Shower of Gold, a Briton named Flavia Fronta, who reveals the head of the rackets in Londinium and it's none other than Florius, the son of the late gangster Balbinus Pius (see Time to Depart). Amicus' interrogations later confirm that Florius is in Britain, at the head of the racket which is named the Jupiter Company (hence all the businesses in Londinium with names connected to Jupiter) and that he is out to get Petro' too. Albia reveals to Falco and Helena that Florius was the man who abducted her earlier, and he had even raped her before Chloris rescued her.

Falco now hopes to apprehend Florius for murdering Verovolcus, but Florius makes the first move by attacking Chloris. A confused battle soon takes place at the local arena, with Falco and his entourage coming in to help Chloris and her comrades, and Splice attempting to take revenge on Florius. Chloris kills Splice, but is slain by Florius who subsequently escapes. A chance meeting with Popilius soon reveals that Norbanus, the businessman courting Falco's sister Maia, is also head of the Jupiter Company. Both Norbanus and Maia have disappeared and Florius sends Falco a message: Petro' must be handed over in order to secure Maia's release. Petro' willingly sacrifices himself and goes over to Florius, but Florius reneges on the bargain. Another battle takes place — this time between the Governor's legions and Florius' gangsters, who are holed up in a public building. Petro' is rescued from being crushed to death, and Falco captures Norbanus, but Florius manages to escape again. Maia, who had actually been stranded with her children while on a river cruise, kills Norbanus with a crossbow when he tries to flee.

Notwithstanding the end of the Jupiter Company, the case against Florius crumbles: the murderer of Verovolcus is revealed to be Flavia Fronta, the waitress at the Shower of Gold: she had stolen Verovolcus' torque and drowned him to prevent him from reporting her theft of his torque, now recovered from the tavern. While this would satisfactorily resolve the diplomatic crisis with the Atrebates, it however now means that Petro's nemesis, Florius, cannot be indicted and is still at large. Cheated of success, Falco and Petro' swear that they will have their revenge on Florius.

== Characters ==
- Aelia Camilla – Wife of Flavius Hilaris, Aunt of Helena Justina.
- Albia – Young street girl adopted by Helena
- Amazonia – also known as Chloris. Gladiatrix, and ex-girlfriend of Falco.
- Amicus – Official torturer
- Crixus – Centurion
- Flavia Fronta – Barmaid
- Florius – Criminal gang leader
- Gaius Flavius Hilaris – Procurator of Finance
- Helena Justina – Wife of Falco, and daughter of the Senator Decimus Camillus Verus
- Lucius Petronius Longus – Friend of Falco and Vigiles Officer
- Maia Favonia – Falco's widowed sister
- Marcus Didius Falco – Informer and Imperial Agent.
- Norbanus Murena – Property developer
- Popillius – Lawyer
- Pyro – Criminal
- Sextus Julius Frontinus – Governor of Britain
- Silvanus – Centurion
- Splice – Criminal
- Togidubnus – Roman ally

== Major themes ==
- Gangland activity in Londinium
- Developing relationship between Maia and Petronius
- The feud between Petro and the Balbinii, a clan of Roman criminals
- The adoption of Albia by Helena Justina

== Allusions/references to history ==
- Set in Londinium, Britannia, in AD 75, during the reign of Emperor Vespasian.
- Sextus Julius Frontinus is a historical character who succeeded Quintus Petillius Cerialis as governor of Britain in AD 75.
- Tiberius Claudius Cogidubnus (or Togidubnus) was a 1st-century king of the Regni in early Roman Britain.

== Release details ==
- 2002, UK, Century Hardback ISBN 0-7126-8044-6
- 2003, UK, Arrow, Paperback ISBN 0-09-929840-6
- UK, Chivers/BBC AudioBooks, read by Christian Rodska, Cassettes ISBN 0-7540-9723-4 CD audios ISBN 0-7540-9621-1
- US, Mysterious Press, Hardback ISBN 0-89296-777-3
- US, Mysterious Press, Paperback ISBN 0-446-69297-2
