= Temple of Bellona =

Temple of Bellona may refer to:

- Temple of Bellona, Rome
- Temple of Bellona, Ostia
