= Ostia Antica =

Large archaeological site of a harbour city near Rome, Italy

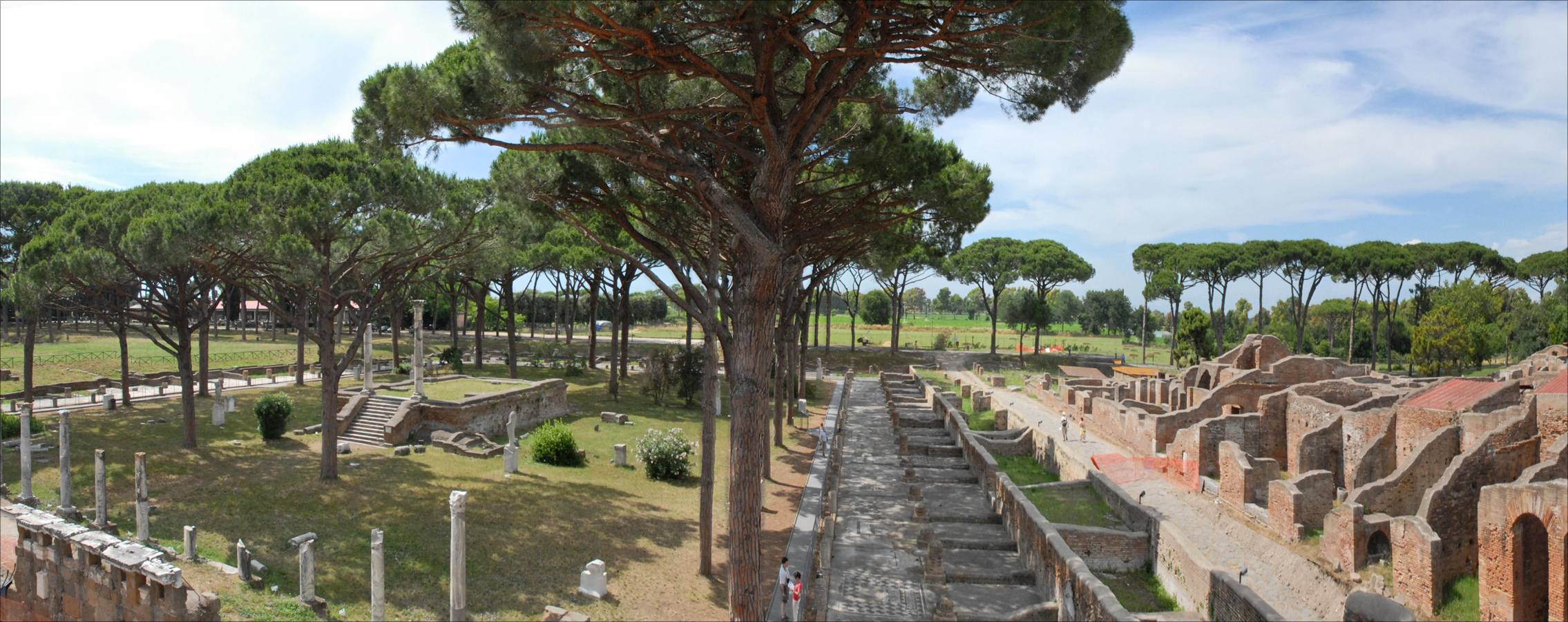
- Market square of Ostia Antica

- Location within Italy
- Click on the map to see marker.
- 41°45′21″N 12°17′30″E
- Type: Settlement
- Cultures: Ancient Rome
- Location: Ostia, Lazio, Italy

History
- Abandoned: 9th century AD

Site notes
- Area: 150 hectares (1.5 km^{2})
- Owner: Public
- Public access: Yes
- Website: www.ostiaantica.beniculturali.it

Ostia Antica (lit. 'Ancient Ostia') is the modern name given to the ancient Roman city of Ostia. It became the port city of Rome located at the mouth of the Tiber and is near modern Ostia, 25 km (16 mi) southwest of Rome. Due to silting of the coastline from the river, the site now lies 3 km (2 mi) from the sea. The name Ostia (the plural of ostium) derives from Latin os 'mouth'.

The city continued to be prosperous into late antiquity despite harbour deterioration. After its abandonment, sand dunes covered the site and aided the city's preservation, which is surpassed only by Pompeii and Herculaneum.

Ostia Antica is now a large archaeological site noted for the excellent preservation of its ancient buildings, magnificent frescoes and impressive mosaics. As in Pompeii, Ostia's remains provide details about Roman urbanism that are not accessible within the city of Rome itself.

== History ==
=== Origins ===
Ostia may have been Rome's first colony. According to legend, Ancus Marcius, the fourth king of Rome, was the first to destroy Ficana, an ancient town that was only 17 km (11 mi) from Rome and had a small harbour on the Tiber, and then proceeded with establishing the new colony 10 km (6 mi) further west and closer to the sea coast. An inscription seems to confirm the establishment of the old castrum (military camp) of Ostia in the 7th century BC. The oldest archaeological remains so far discovered date back to only the 4th century BC. The most ancient buildings currently visible are from the 3rd century BC, notably the Castrum; of a slightly later date is the Capitolium (temple of Jupiter, Juno and Minerva).

=== Republican Age ===
Ostia probably developed as a naval base and in 267 BC, during the First Punic War, it was the seat of the quaestor Ostiensis in charge of the fleet. It had an important commercial and military role during the Second Punic War, so that it obtained exemption from military service for its inhabitants.

During the 2nd century BC its role as a commercial port for the import of grain to Rome gradually became prevalent and buildings began to spread outside the castrum. The ancient dock on the right bank of the river became insufficient for the growing needs of Rome, so that the praetor Gaius Caninius appropriated a large portion of land on the left bank for new docks.

As the city of Rome grew, Ostia did not have the capacity to supply all its needs and Puteoli became the major port of Rome, despite being located 240km from the capital.

==== Civil wars ====
Ostia was a scene of fighting during the period of civil wars in the 80s BC. In 87 BC Marius attacked the city in order to cut off the flow of trade to Rome, aided by his generals Cinna, Carbo and Sertorius, and captured the city and plundered it.

==== Sacking by pirates ====
In 68 BC, the town was sacked by pirates, who set the port on fire, destroyed the consular war fleet, and kidnapped two prominent senators. This attack caused such panic in Rome that Pompey the Great arranged for the tribune Aulus Gabinius to pass a law, the lex Gabinia, to allow Pompey to raise an army and destroy the pirates. Within a year, the pirates had been defeated.

The town was then re-built and provided with defensive walls started under Marcus Tullius Cicero according to an inscription.

=== Imperial Ostia ===
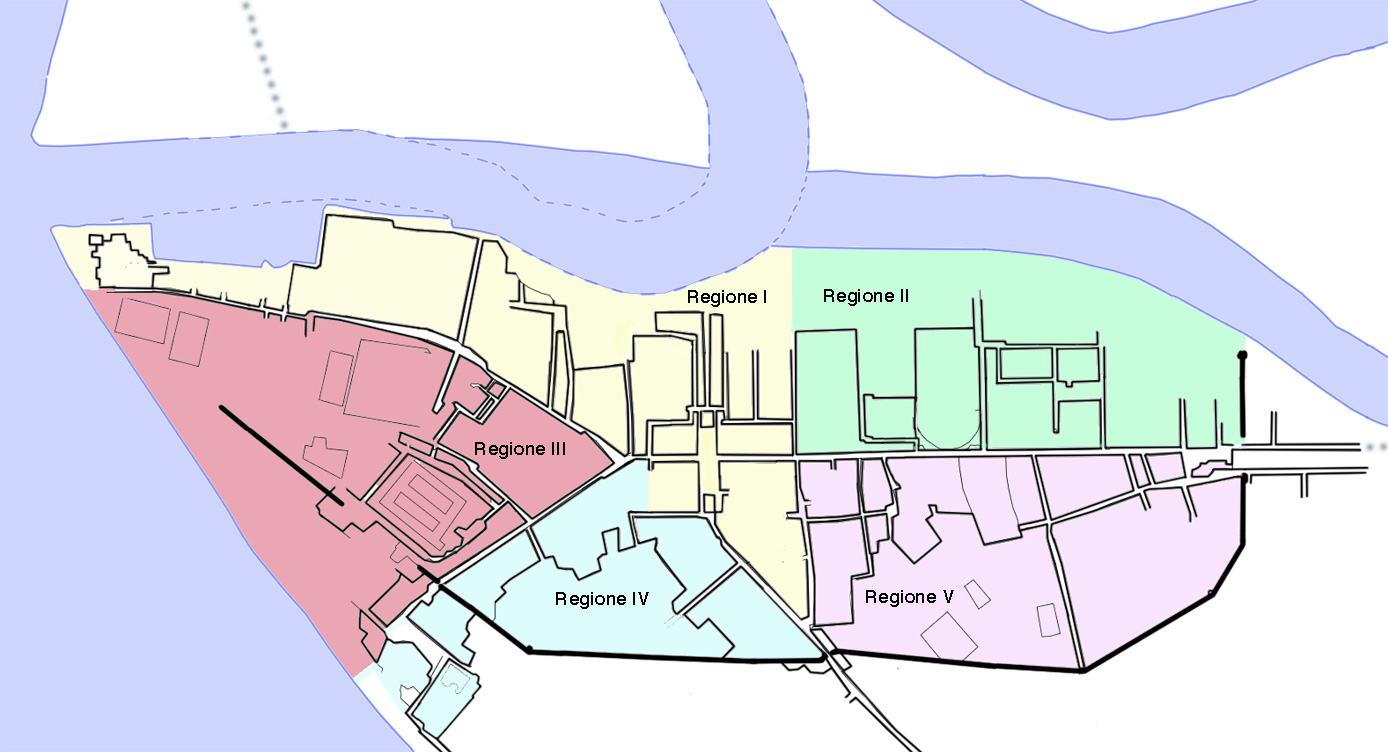
Map of Ostia Antica with ancient coastline and "Regione"

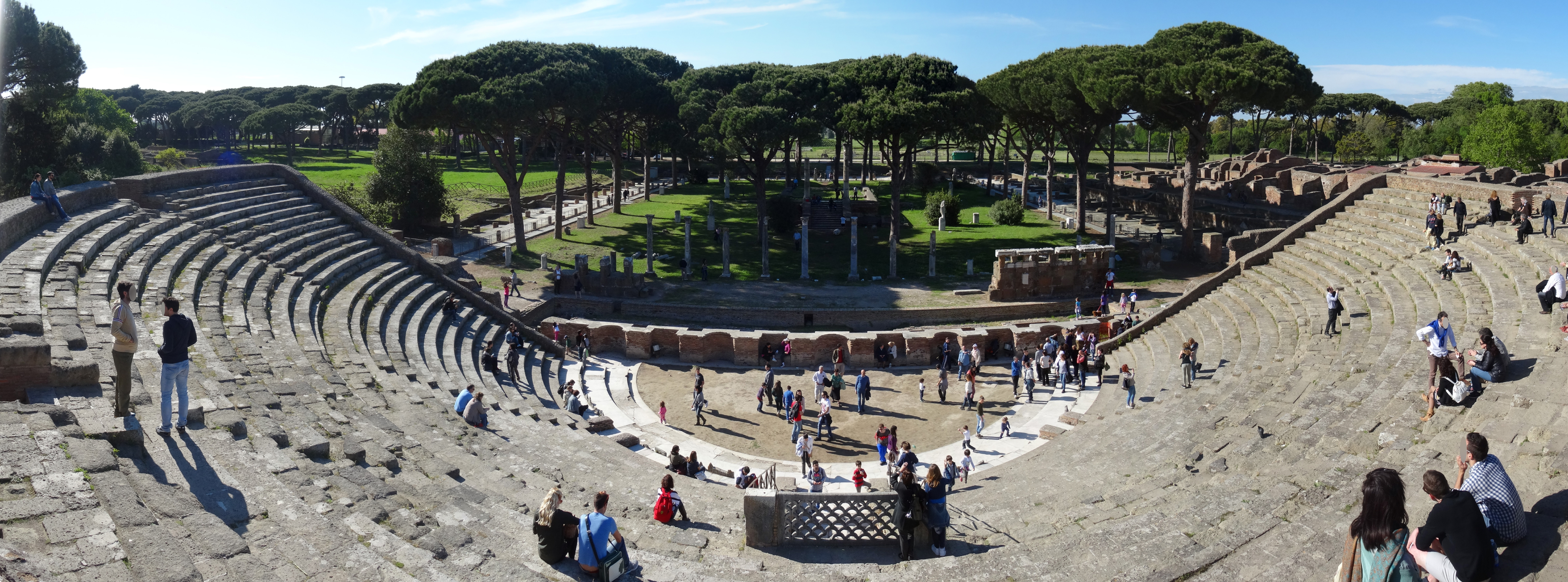
View of the Forum from the Theatre

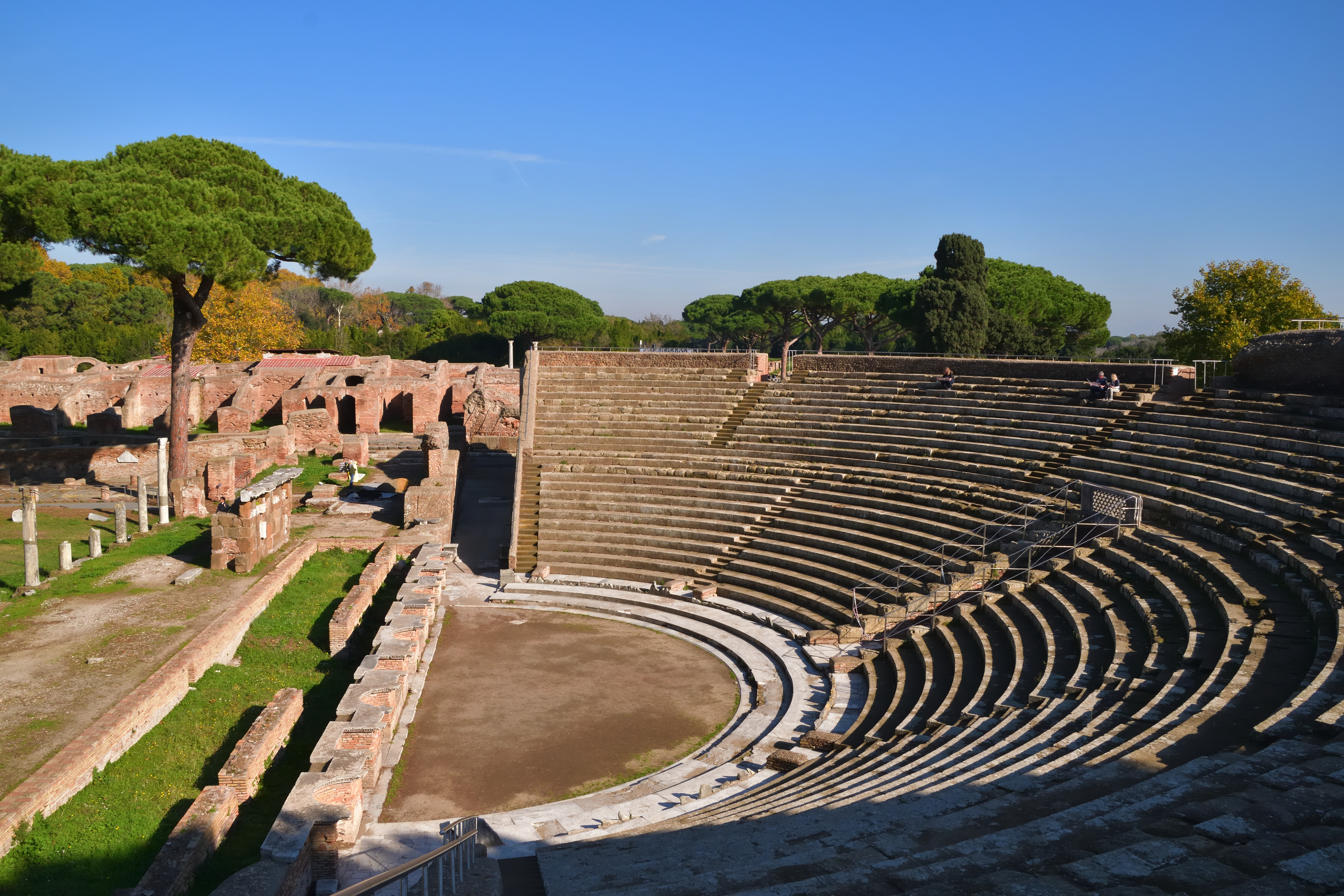
The Ancient Roman theatre

During the Augustan age, Agrippa had the theatre built (18-12 BC), the city forum was probably built under Tiberius and under Caligula (37-41 AD) an aqueduct was built. In 14 AD Claudius replaced the ancient office of the Ostian quaestors with a procurator annonae of the equestrian order, in charge of the grain supply (annona).

Due to the small size of the harbour at Ostia, Claudius commissioned a massive new harbour at Portus on the northern mouths of the Tiber (Fiumara Grande). Insufficiently protected from storms, Claudius' project was later supplemented by the hexagonal harbour built by Trajan and finished in 113 AD. Trajan also developed the harbour of Civitavecchia (Centum Cellae), 20 km (12 mi) away.

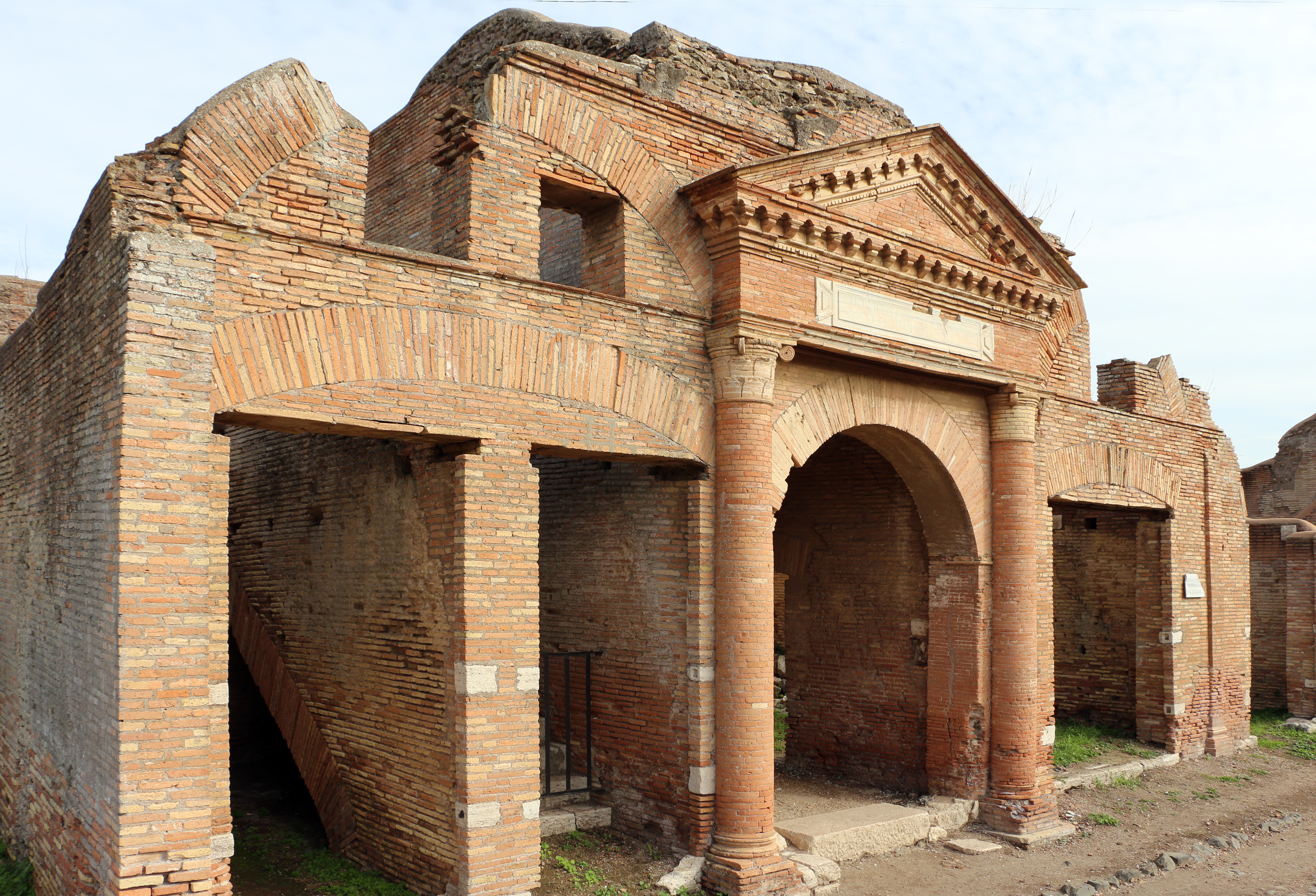
The Horrea Epagathiana et Epaphroditiana, a horreum in Ostia built c. 145–150 AD

The development of port activities increased the prosperity of Ostia, which maintained its function as an administrative centre for the corn supply so that it is estimated that in the 2nd century AD it had around 50,000 inhabitants; the city underwent major construction under Hadrian, who twice held the main city magistracy of duumvir, and under his successors. Construction continued at least until the end of the Severan age when the theatre was restored and a large market and the Via Severiana were built.

Ostia itself was provided with all the services a town of the time could require; a large theatre, many public and private baths (such as the Thermae Gavii Maximi, numerous taverns and inns and a firefighting service. The popularity of the cult of Mithras is evident in the discovery of eighteen Mithraea.

Ostia also contained the Ostia Synagogue, the earliest synagogue yet identified in Europe. Archaeological and architectural analysis indicates that the synagogue was likely constructed in the late 1st century AD, making it contemporary with the early imperial development of the city. Scholarly reassessment of the building's masonry, foundations, and spatial organization suggests that it was monumental and purpose-built from its earliest phase. The synagogue underwent several renovations between the 2nd and 4th centuries, including structural reinforcements, interior reconfiguration, and the installation of a Torah shrine.

The crisis of the third century brought about a decline in population, as demonstrated by the collapsed and never rebuilt buildings, and the lack of local magistrates when the city was placed directly under the procurator annonae.

=== Late-Roman and sub-Roman Ostia ===
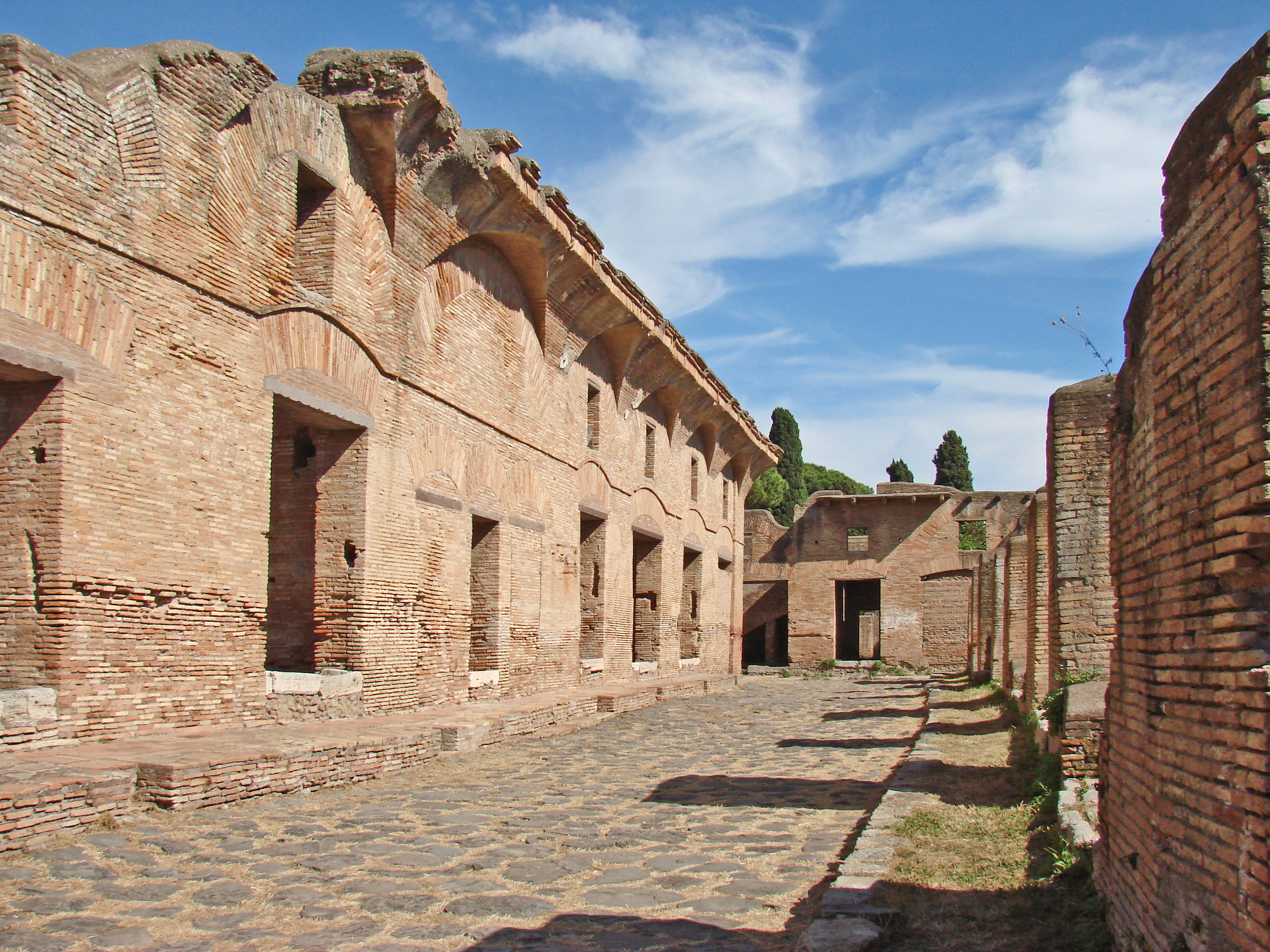
Via di Diana

At the beginning of the 4th century, Maxentius founded the mint of Ostia transferring that of Carthage here (308/309).

After Constantine the Great made the city of Portus independent, renaming it Civitas Flavia Constantiniana, it used to be thought that Ostia entered a period of slow decline, indicated by some apartment blocks being replaced by houses of the rich, but recent excavations show that the town continued to thrive. Economic activity largely moved to Portus, but Ostia was transformed into a luxurious residential centre, with the ancient production areas now abandoned but with a resumption of construction often with the reuse of older materials.

It had become an episcopal see as part of the Diocese of Rome as early as the 3rd century AD, and Constantine built an episcopal basilica in Ostia dedicated to the saints Peter, Paul and John the Baptist located in the south-east of the city.

The city was mentioned by St Augustine when he passed there in the late 4th century. On their way back to Africa after Augustine's conversion to Christianity, Augustine's mother, Saint Monica, died in 387 in Ostia. The church (titulus) of Santa Aurea in Ostia was built on her burial site.

Numerous baths are recorded as still operating in the 4th (when 26 remained in operation) and 5th centuries with major repairs of the city's Neptune Baths in the 370s.

Towards the end of the 4th century, the settlement was concentrated in the extra-mural area of Porta Marina along the Via Severiana which connected Portus with Terracina while many of the city's buildings were now in ruins, so that Ostia was not involved in the sack of Rome, as Portus was.

The poet Rutilius Namatianus reported the lack of maintenance of the city ports in 414 AD. This view has been challenged by Boin who states Namatianus' verse is a literary construct and inconsistent with the archaeological record.

Prosperity in the 5th century is indicated by repairs on baths, public buildings, church construction, street repaving, residential and business expansion beyond the perimeter of the south wall (the presence of a small harbour, the Porta Marina on the sea, is attested). A huge 4th century villa east of the Maritime baths was built. The river port on the western edge of the town was expanded with the navalia, a squarish basin built in from the river. A warehouse on the east side and, behind it, a large bath complex were built.

After the fall of the Western Roman Empire in 476, Ostia fell slowly into decay as the population of Rome, 700–800,000 in AD 400 contracted to 200,000 or less in 500 AD. A naval battle, the Battle of Ostia, was fought there in 849 between Christians and Saracens; the remaining inhabitants moved to Gregoriopolis a short distance away.

== Description ==
=== Urban planning ===
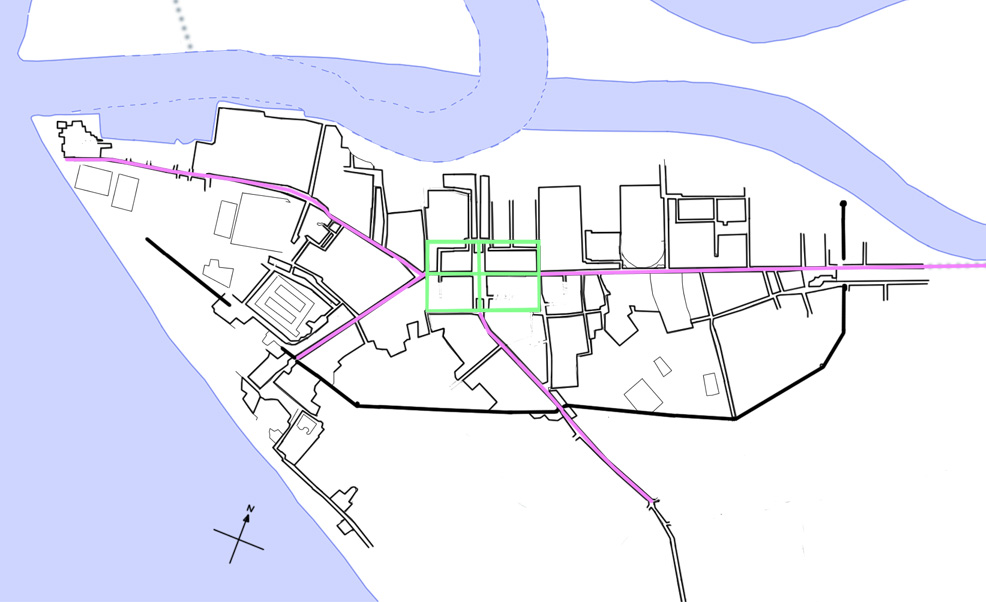
Plan with the castrum superimposed on the road system

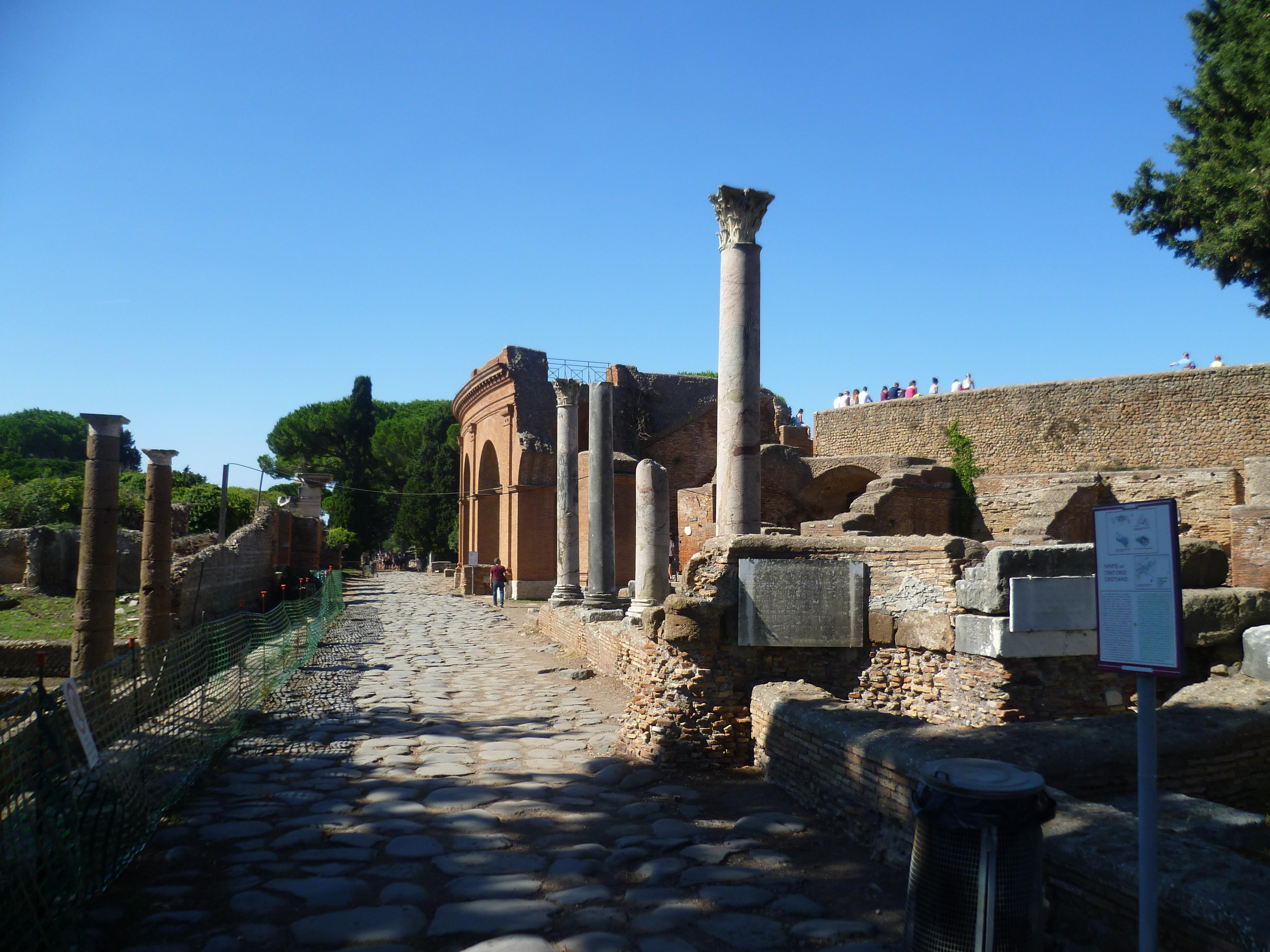
Decumanus Maximus near the Theatre

The republican castrum at the core of the settlement had a typical rectangular plan built on two main roads that crossed at right angles in the centre: the cardo and the decumanus maximus, the latter on the route of the Via Ostiense coming from Rome. The cardo and the decumanus exited the walls of the castrum through four gates. Its walls are just over 1.5 m thick in square blocks of Fidene tuff arranged irregularly. Sections of the walls have been reused on the eastern side as a back wall of a building with taverns (I,I,4) and inside the Small Market (I,VIII,1), the Horrea epagathiana (I,VIII,3) and the building at (I,VIII,10).

Immediately outside the southern gate the cardo turned southwest on the route of the ancient coastal road towards Laurentum (which later became a section of the Via Severiana). Immediately after the western gate, the decumanus turned southeast, heading directly towards the beach then not far away. The subsequent expansion of the city outside the walls of the castrum followed these routes, giving a disorderly appearance to the urban plan.

Inside the city, another important road was the Via Semita dei cippi, from the cippi (stones) on which was the Semitic inscription hor(reorum) (warehouses) where the grain was stored; the road directly connected the decumanus maximus to the Laurentina gate (its continuation on the opposite side of the decumanus towards the river has the modern name of Via dei Molini).

From the 1st century AD, the area between the walls of Porta Marina and the nearby sea coast had much multifunctional construction so that next to religious buildings, such as the sanctuary of Bona Dea, there are the Domus Fulminata, the mausoleum of the Gamala and commercial premises, such as the Caupona of the god Pan. In the Trajan and Hadrianic eras this area was divided into lots and, among other buildings, the Terme della Marciana and the Terme del Sileno were built; this entire coastal area was served by a coastal road used for local traffic which was paved in the Severan era.

=== City walls ===
In 63 BC the city walls were started during the consulate of Cicero and completed by Publius Clodius Pulcher, tribune of the plebs in 58 BC. They were built with tuff blocks from Monteverde. At the base they are approximately 1.5 m thick and are made up of recessed bands of about 2 feet in height; on the internal face they must have been supported by an embankment.

The walls enclosed the city in an irregular path and enclosed an area of approximately 69 ha. Only a few sections are preserved and it is not known whether they continued along the river, where they would have hindered port operations. It is possible that they ended with two square towers near the river, the remains of which are preserved outside the current archaeological area: the Aldobrandini Mithraeum was later built against one of them (I,I,3).

Buildings arose against the walls as early as the Augustan age and with Vespasian the walls were used to support an aqueduct. Their defensive function was not restored even in the late ancient period when the city was subjected to external attacks, but the city was then of reduced importance having lost its commercial and economic functions in favour of Portus and the theatre was used as a fortress.

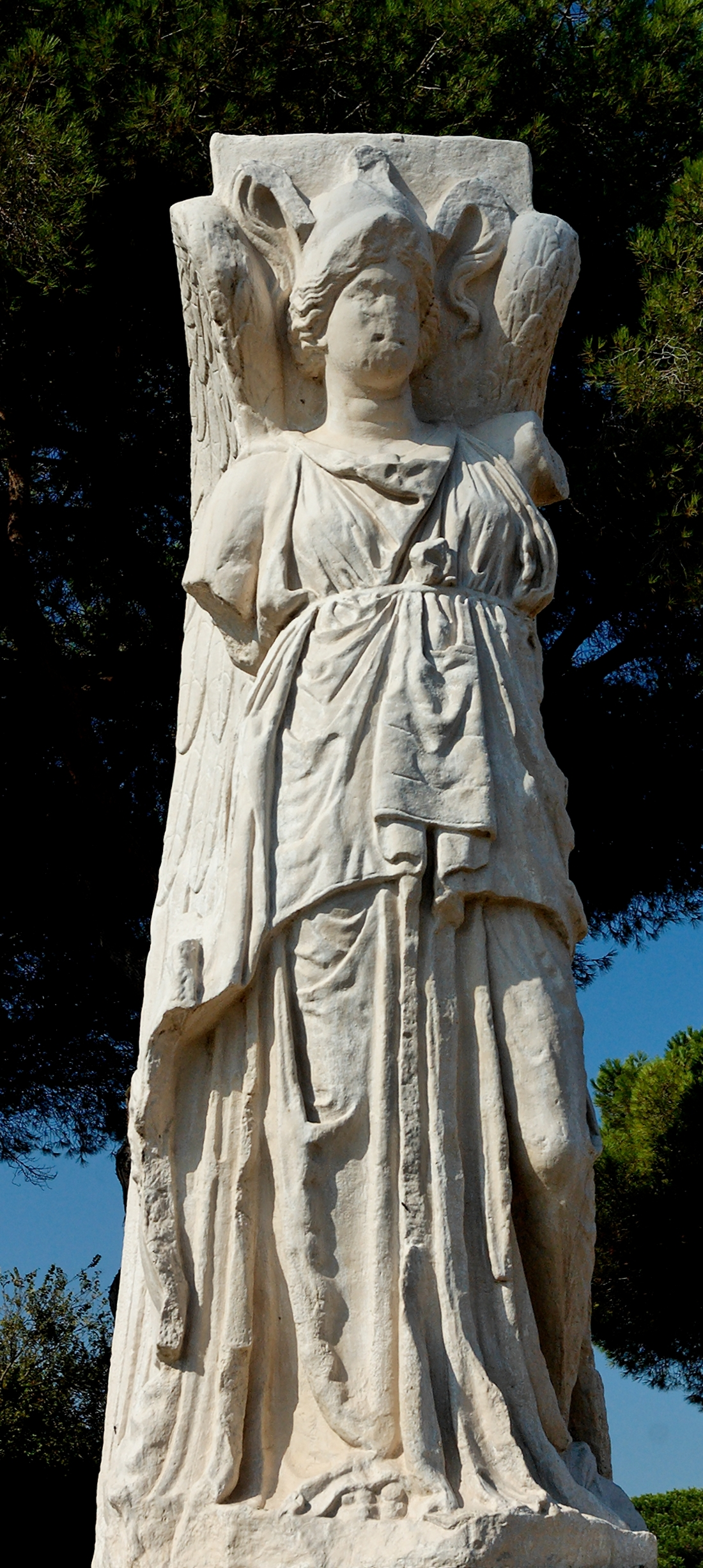
Minerva Victrix from the Porta Romana

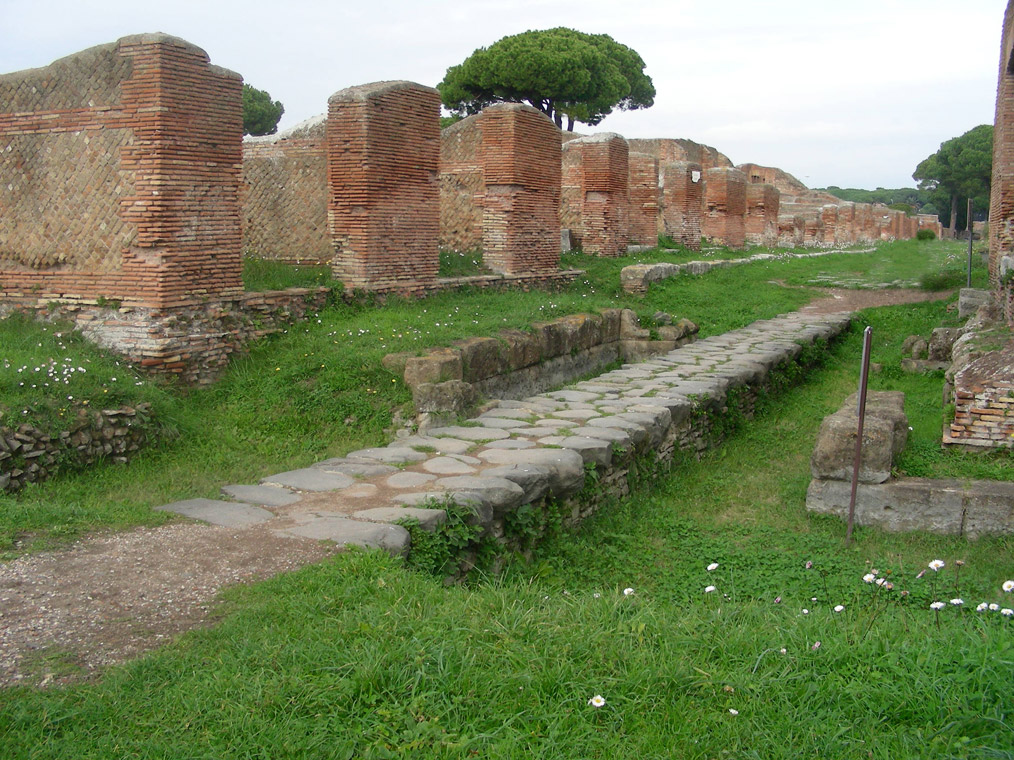
Remains of Porta Marina

In the walls were three gates known by modern names:

- the Porta Romana at the eastern end of the decumanus maximus in the direction of Rome, is built in square blocks of tuff, with the entrance arch further back from the walls, and flanked by two square towers. In the Domitian era it was rebuilt at a higher level, with architectural decoration in marble and with a statue of Minerva as winged Victory. Immediately outside the gate there is a base for a statue to the health of the emperor by a member of the family of the Acili Glabrioni, patrons of the colony. A little further south a secondary gate was found, perhaps built at the same time as the reconstruction of the Porta Romana.
- Porta Laurentina at the end of the southern section of the cardo maximus. consists of a rectangular structure in tuff blocks, flanked by square towers 5.85 m high. With a single room, it retains the grooves for the portcullis and the recess used to close the door.
- The Porta Marina was towards the beach, at the west end of the decumanus maximus. Built in tuff blocks with a recessed archway and flanked by square towers. It was razed to the ground in the 1st century and replaced by an arch further south with marble decoration. In the first half of the 3rd century, the caupona of Alexander was built on top of the remains (IV,VII,4).

=== The Forum ===
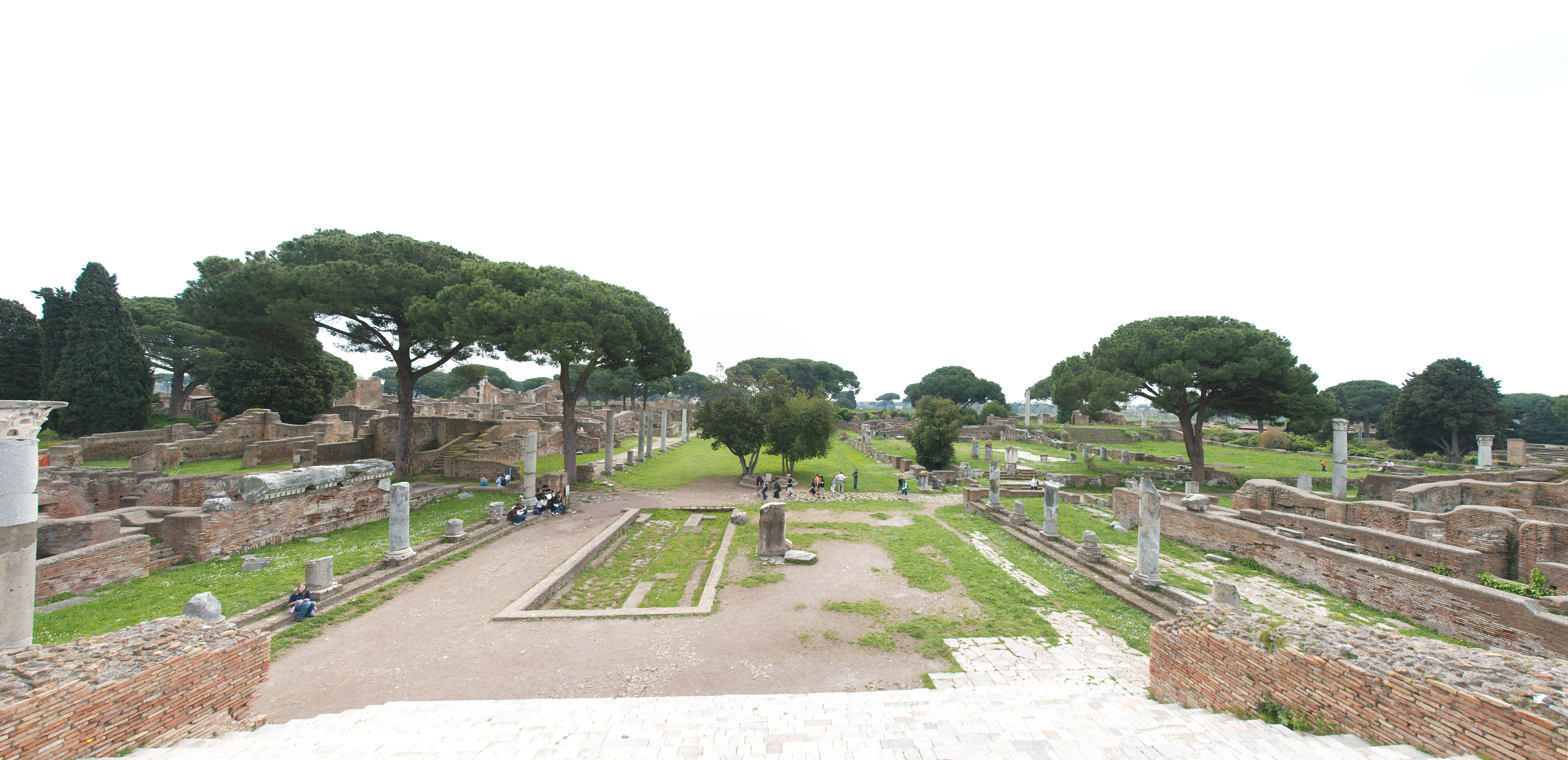
Forum from the Capitolium

The Forum is narrow and elongated in shape and at the centre of the ancient castrum. It was laid out in the Augustan age and transformed under Hadrian. It is flanked by porticoes and at one end is dominated by Hadrian's Capitolium, while opposite is the temple of Rome and Augustus erected under Tiberius. The Basilica and the Curia, seat of the decurions, also overlook the western side of the forum.

Along the southern side of the decumanus maximus which crosses the forum are other monumental buildings, including the porticoed Forum of the Heroic Statue (mid-4th century) and the so-called Round Temple with a courtyard in front, (3rd century). To the south-east of the Forum stand the large Forum Baths complex erected under Antoninus Pius.

=== Residential buildings ===
==== Apartment blocks (Insulae) ====
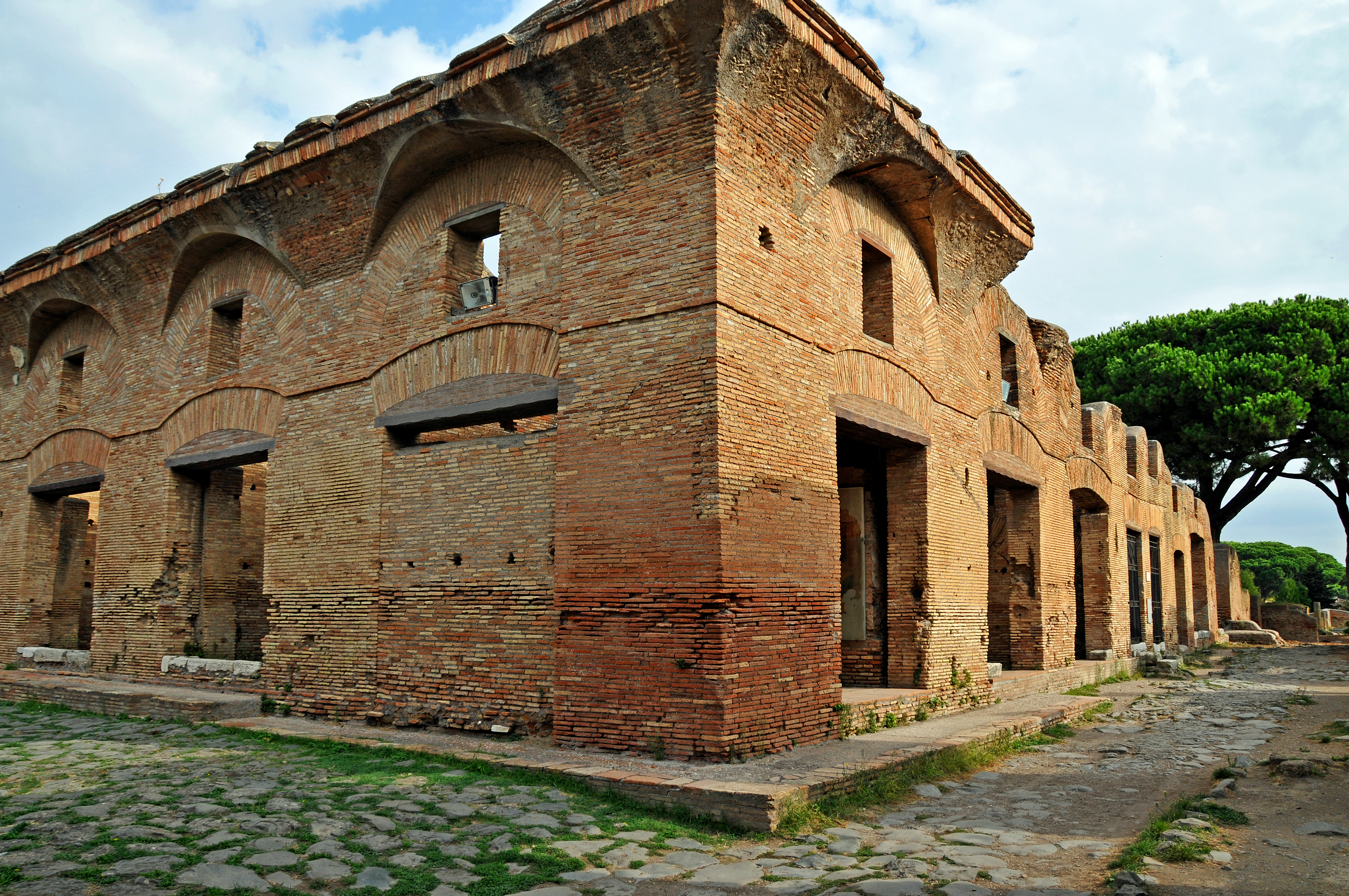
Insula "of Diana"

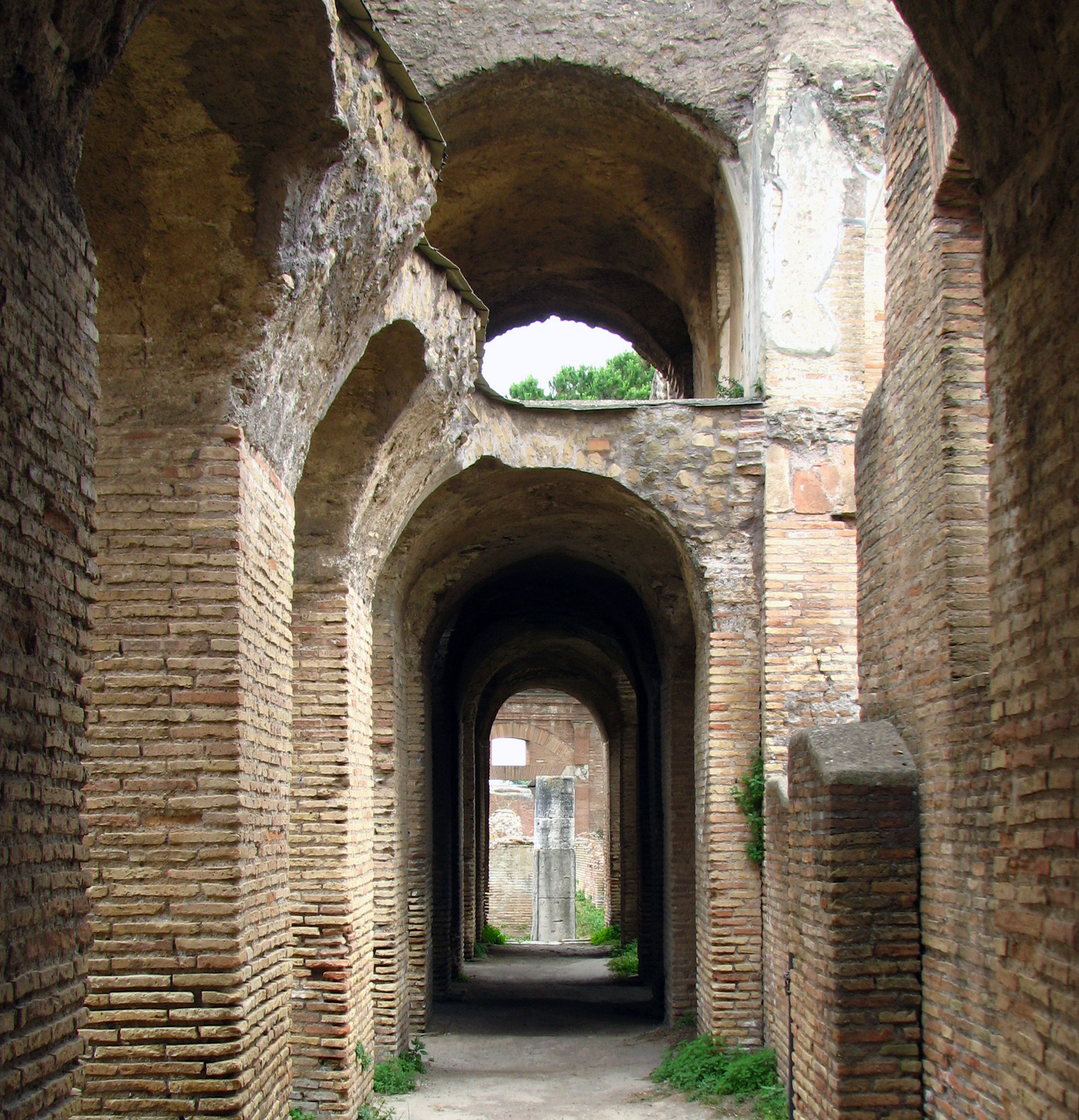
Insula of the Aurighi (chariot racers)

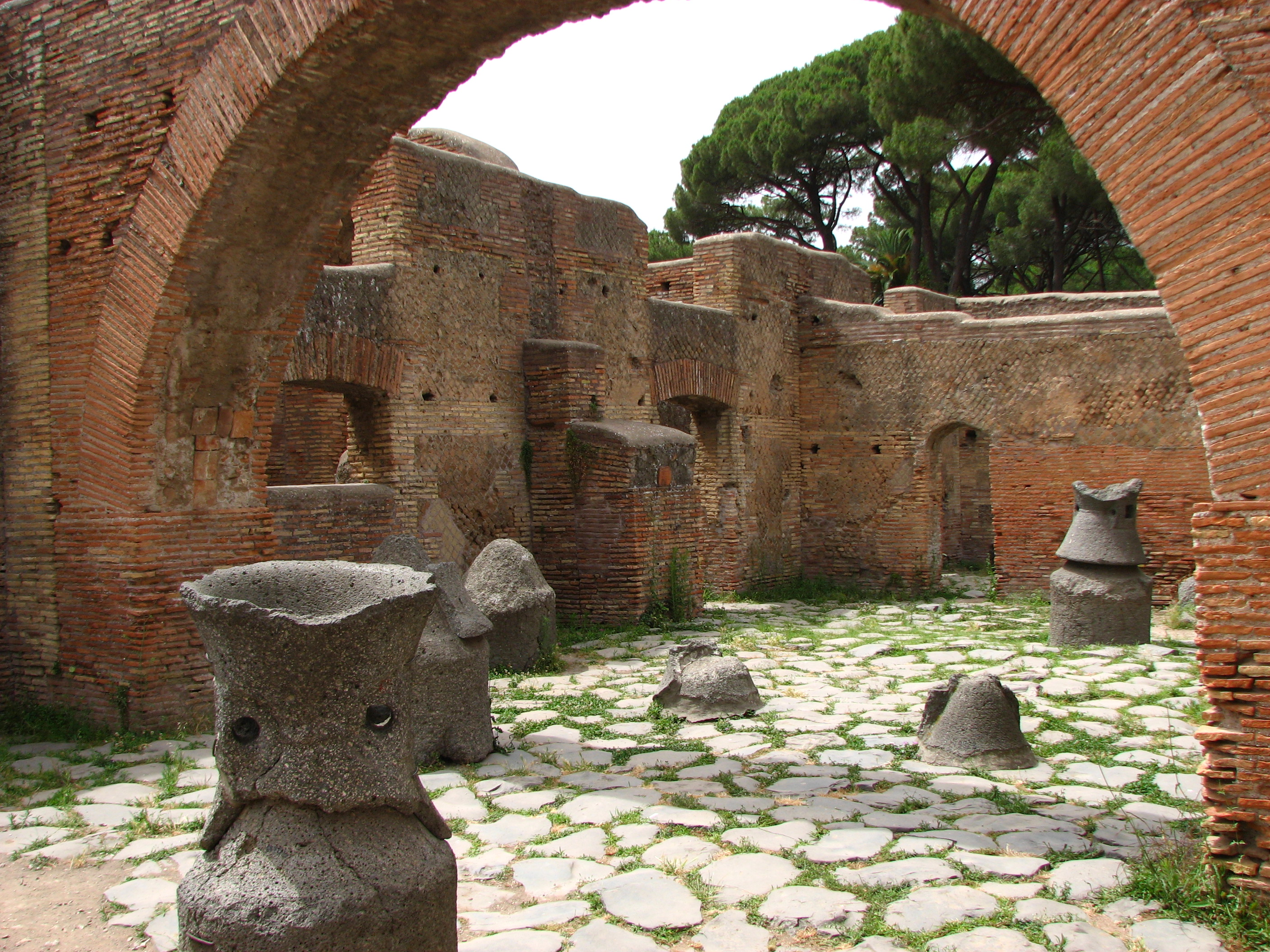
Insula of the "mills"

These were multi-storey buildings split into apartments (cenacula) for multiple occupancy, and distributed over the city. On the ground floor were normally many tabernae (shops) opening onto the street, sometimes fronted by porticos. When part of the ground floor was occupied by more prestigious apartments or workshops, entrances to the private internal areas were often flanked by tabernae. In some cases, for example in the Lararium building (I,IX,3), tabernae also fronted the internal courtyards. Access to cheaper apartments on the upper floors was almost always via separate stairs entered from the outside. In the more expensive apartments, internal stairs led to the second floor. In some cases there could be common services, accessible from the internal courtyard and some insulae were perhaps used as an inn (caupona).

Sometimes the tabernae had mezzanines, accessible by an internal staircase and lit by a window above the door and which also could serve as a residence for the merchant, or the mezzanine or back room could serve as a warehouse for goods. They often underwent modifications over time and in some cases were changed to apartments or workshops, reducing the external doors. The Basilical house (I, IX, I) has a series of shops along the road and internal rooms overlooking a courtyard while on the upper floor a bridge crossed the courtyard, creating a central covered passage.

==== Apartments with a medianum ====
More luxurious apartments often have a central room (medianum), at either side of which are large living and reception rooms, while smaller rooms (cubicula or bedrooms) are opposite the entrance, including service rooms (kitchen and latrine). The most luxurious apartments may also have an upper floor accessed by an internal staircase and in these cases the reception rooms may be of greater height, spanning both floors. Apartments on upper floors accessed by private staircases often have similar layouts.

- The House of the Child Bacchus (I, IV, 3) and House of the Paintings (I, IV, 4) are two-storey apartments with double-height reception rooms and internal staircase, with double entrance and windows onto Via dei Dipinti and onto the internal garden on the opposite side, shared with the house of Jupiter and Ganymede (I,IV,2). On the higher floors were other dwellings, reachable by independent staircases from the Via dei Dipinti and from the internal garden.
- Apartment of building (I, XIV, 9): accessible from a corridor between the shops facing the street with a separate staircase to the upper floors. The entrance features an architectural brick portal. The corridor has a niche with a fountain at the end: this opens onto a passage to one of the shops, a small vestibule to the north, which opens onto a smaller and a larger room, from which the northernmost tavern is in turn accessible. On the opposite side of the corridor, another small corridor provides access to two more small rooms and a larger room at the end. The floor plan is similar to that of medianum apartments, but bisected by the corridor.
- two apartments in Via dei Vigili (II, III, 3–4) dating to the Hadrianic period are arranged side by side and accessible from a corridor that opened onto Via dei Vigili, with an independent staircase to the upper floors; two other staircases to the upper apartments are found at the end of the corridor and in a corner of the southern apartment, with traces of doors; latrines were created in the internal understairs areas. Both apartments have windows opening onto the street and the northern one also on the north side, opposite the entrance. From the entrance corridor one enters the medianum which receives light from the windows on the street, and on the side opposite the entrance is a large room divided into two parts by pillars; two cubicula (bedrooms) open at the end of the medianum and another small room next to the entrance corridor. The northern apartment, which is larger, has another small room opening onto the entrance corridor, and a corridor in front of the reception room opposite the entrance. Both apartments retain traces of floor mosaics and frescoes with red and yellow panels.
- House of the Child Hercules (II, VI, 3–4) is in a building from the Hadrianic period with shops overlooking Via della Fortuna and an apartment overlooking Via delle Corporazioni, on the opposite side, accessible from a transverse corridor which connected the two streets. The apartment had the usual plan with an open medianum with windows overlooking Via delle Corporazioni, reception rooms at the ends and bedrooms on the rear opposite the windows. Next to the reception room to the north is a staircase to the upper floors. During the excavation, paintings depicting mythological scenes were found including a child Hercules strangling serpents which gave the house its name. Small troves of coins were also found there, the latest of which is dated around 425.
- House of the Painted Ceiling (II, VI, 5–6) is a building similar to the previous one, from the Hadrianic era, with an apartment along Via della Fontana which was accessed from a corridor to the south. It was divided into an entrance corridor next to a small reception room, flanked also by an internal staircase to the upper floor. The corridor led to the medianum, open with windows along the street and with spaces separated by partitions at the end; at the opposite end was a larger reception room. In the age of Commodus the apartment was reduced and the reception room to the north with the adjacent section of the medianum became a separate apartment, accessible from the north; the internal staircase was closed and a small room was built at the end of the medianum. The frescoed walls of the rooms of the house belong to this phase, with red and yellow panels and small figures in an architectural framework.

==== Town houses (Domus) ====
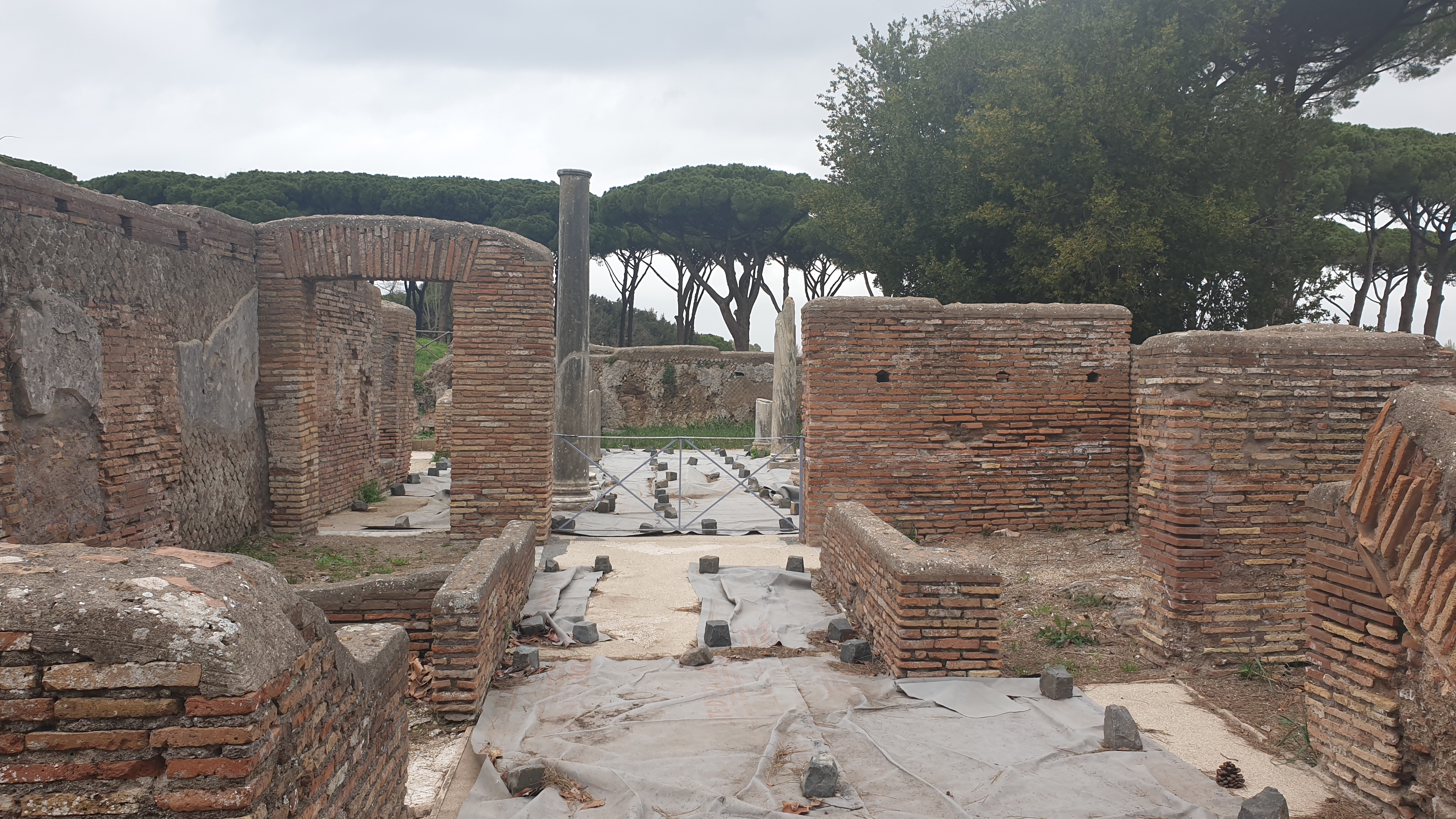
House of Apuleius

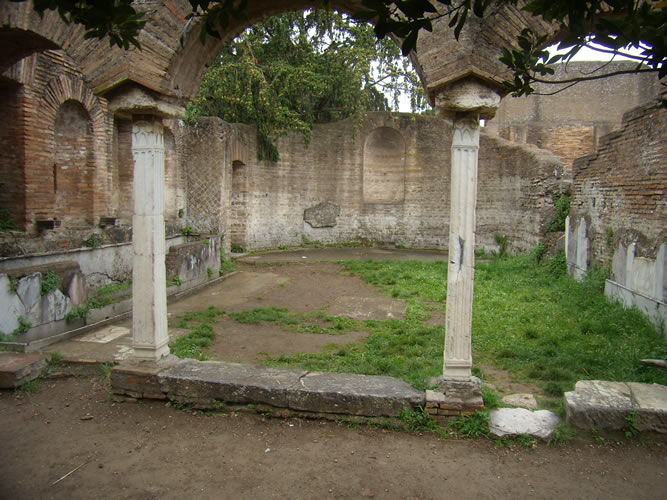
Domus della Fortuna Annonaria

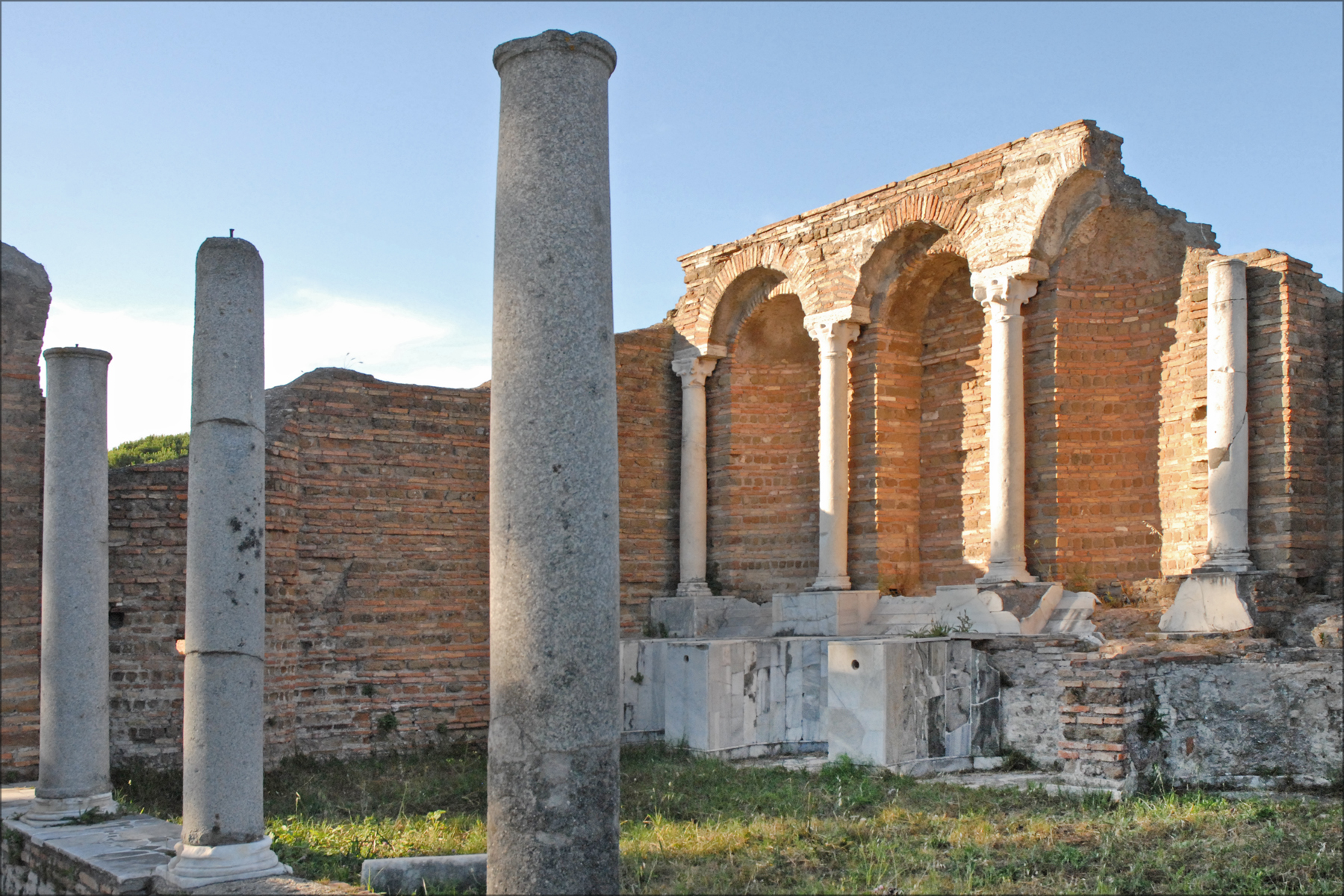
Domus of Cupid and Psyche

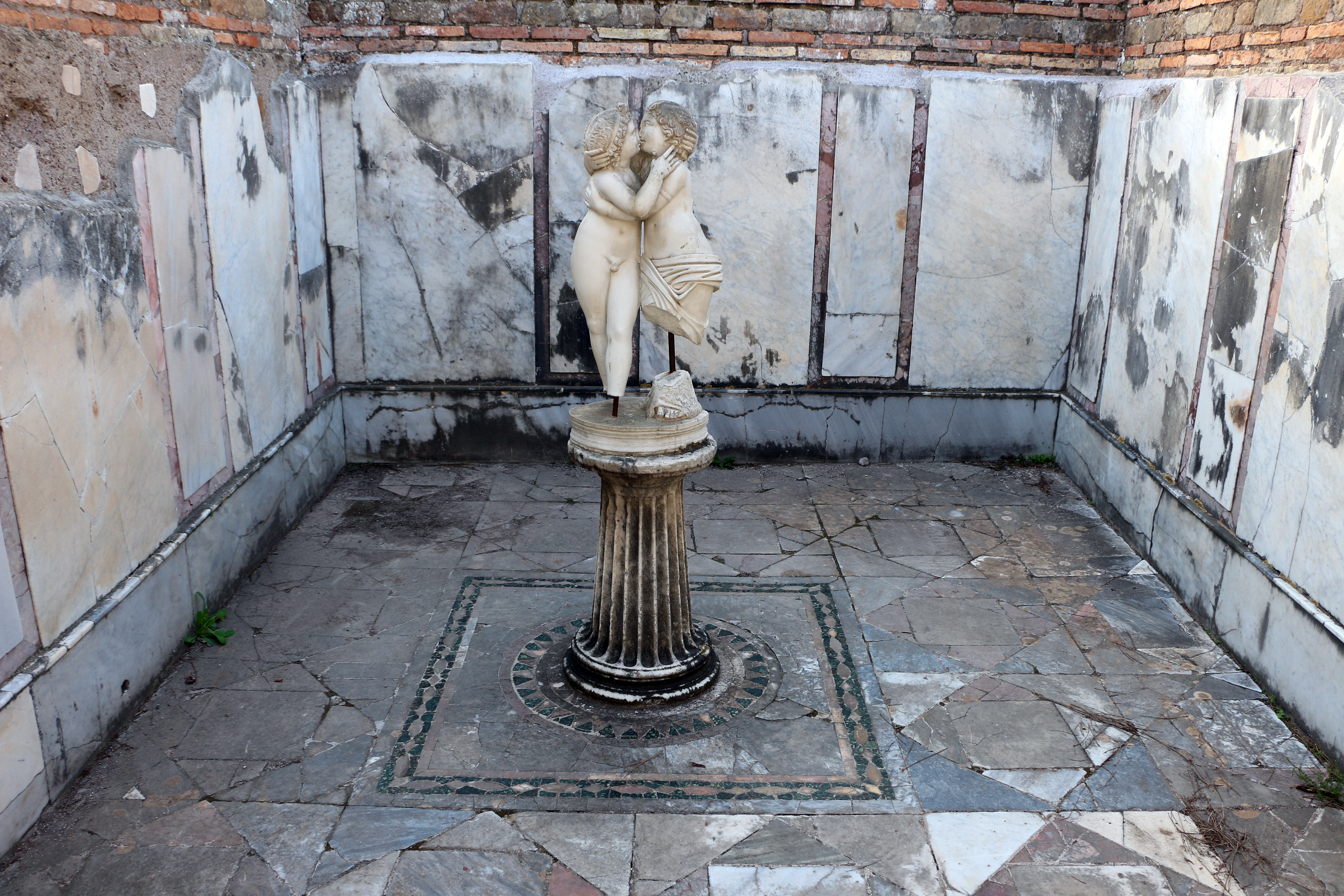
Domus of Cupid and Psyche

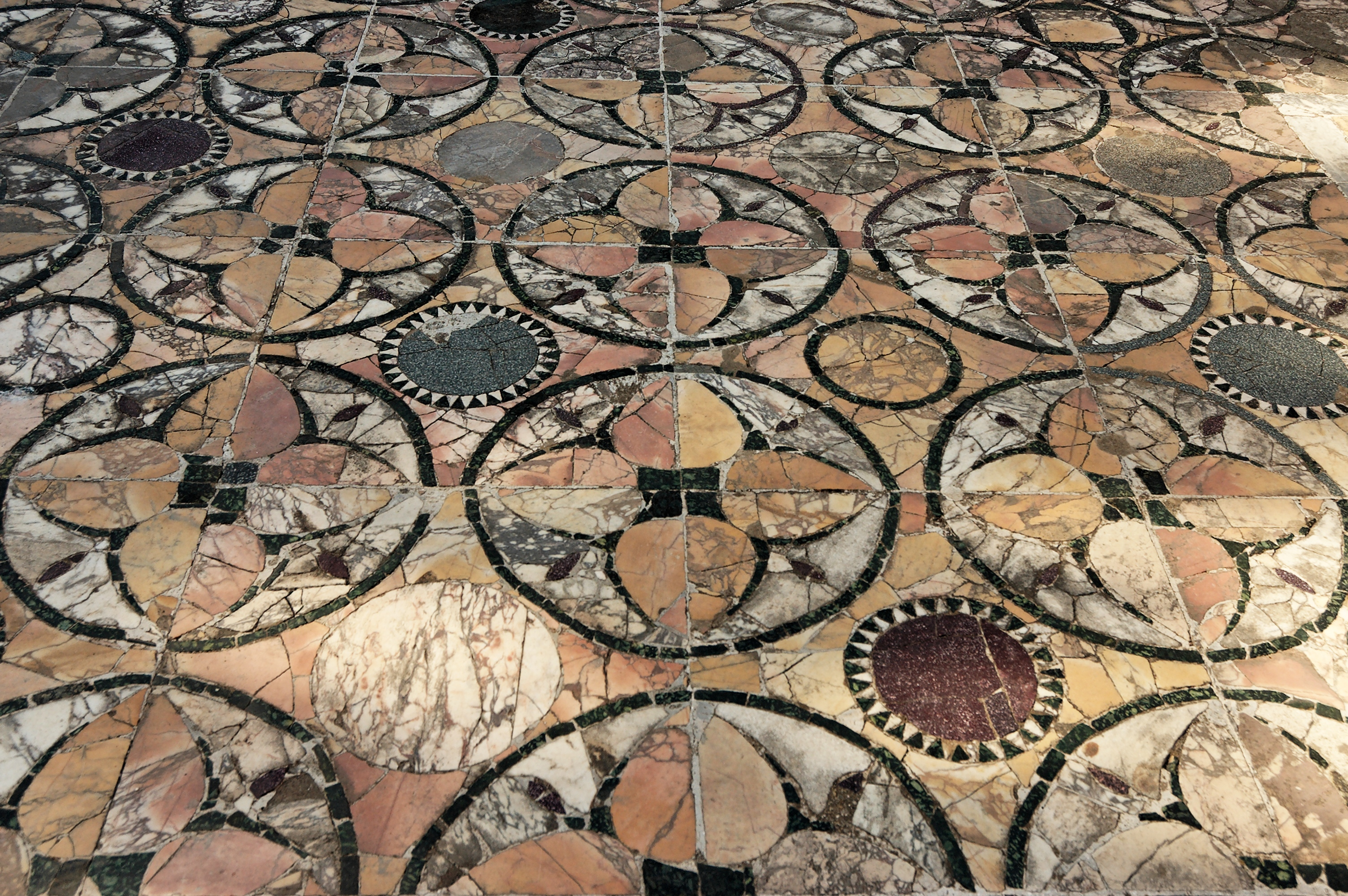
Opus sectile, Room C, House of Cupid and Psyche

The layout of the domus changed over time: in the Imperial age rooms were arranged around an open courtyard (atrium), often with upper floors integrated into the same housing unit, for example:

- Domus of Apuleius (II, II, 8) (Trajan era 98–117 AD)
- House of Jupiter and Ganymede (I, IV, 2) from the Hadrianic period (117–138 AD) on two floors with an internal staircase, arranged around a courtyard overlooking an internal garden, shared with the House of the Paintings (I, IV, 4) and the House of the Child Bacchus (I, IV, 3); during the time of Commodus it underwent changes with some rooms on the street used as shops, and was decorated with frescoes (including the Birth of Venus, Jupiter and Ganymede, Leda and the Swan). It was perhaps used as a hotel and/or brothel. In the 3rd century workshops were established in the garden.

In the late ancient period, the most luxurious houses were often adapted from previous ones with courtyards (atria), fountains and rooms with marble coverings and mosaics; often the reception room had an apse and was slightly raised, with columns at the entrance.

- The House of the Round Temple (I, XI, 2–3), built between the late 3rd and early 4th centuries has an entrance vestibule paved in monochrome mosaic opening to the south onto Via del Tempio Rotondo and framed by pillars with travertine bases. Alongside are two shops with a mezzanine (the internal staircases remain) and a separate staircase leading to the upper floors. The vestibule leads to another staircase leading to the upper floor of the house, also accessible from the street. The interior is arranged around a courtyard surrounded on three sides by a corridor paved in black and white geometric mosaic, with a central fountain clad in marble. At the back, opening directly onto the courtyard, aligned with the entrance, is the main room with opus sectile marble and a raised entrance with two columns. The rooms opening onto the corridor to the west are clad in marble and heated, perhaps from a room with a lower floor. At the back is a kitchen. Other rooms open onto the opposite side, one of which with a brick counter and niche may have been a shrine.
- Domus of Cupid and Psyche (I, XIV, 5) (second quarter of the 4th century) occupies a site of the 2nd century. Its rooms still have walls covered in marble panels and floors paved with expensive opus sectile arranged around a central hallway which takes light from a small internal garden with nymphaeum.
- Domus della Fortuna Annonaria (V, II, 8), built in the 2nd century over earlier shops, underwent building works until the 5th century, is a luxurious house embellished with marble and artistic works, with an internal porticoed courtyard onto which the main apsidal reception room, with a heated master bedroom, overlooks.

== Surroundings ==
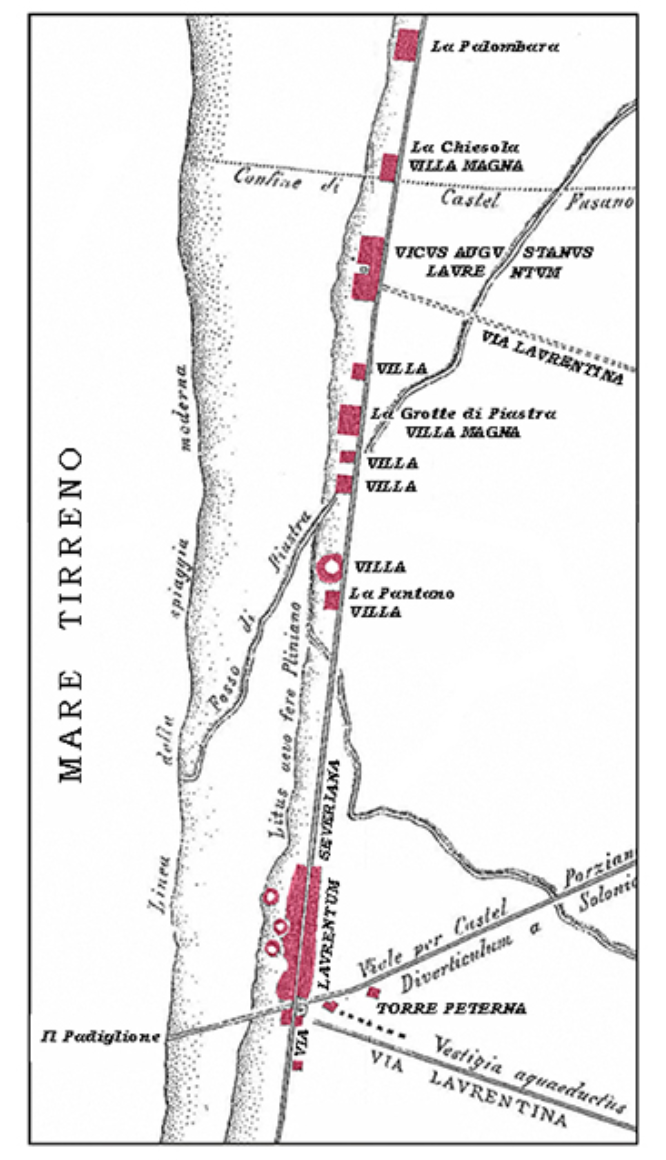
Map of Roman villas between Ostia and Laurentum (Lanciani 1903)

South of Ostia many rich villa-estates were developed from the Republican era along the coast road to Laurentum. Pliny described the route towards his villa there: “There are two different roads to it: if you go by that of Laurentum, you must turn off at the fourteenth mile-stone; if by that of Ostia, at the eleventh. Both of them are sandy in places, which makes it a little heavier and longer by carriage, but short and easy on horseback. The landscape affords plenty of variety, the view in some places being closed in by woods, in others extending over broad meadows, where numerous flocks of sheep and herds of cattle, which the severity of the winter has driven from the mountains, fatten in the spring warmth, and on the rich pasturage”.

Today several well-preserved Roman villas south of Ostia have been excavated in the area of Castel Fusano, including the Villa della Palombara excavated in 1989–2008.

== Excavations ==
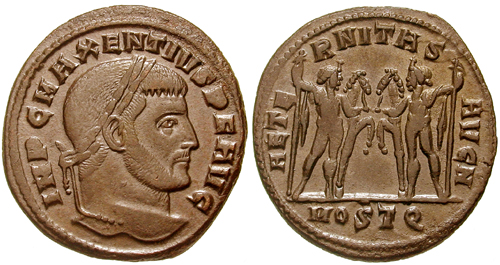
Ostia housed a late imperial mint; this coin of Maxentius was struck there.

The remains were used over the centuries as a quarry for marble for the palazzi built in Rome.

The Papacy started organising its own digs for sculptures with Pope Pius VII.

Under Benito Mussolini massive excavations were undertaken from 1939 to 1942 during which several remains, particularly from the Republican Period, were brought to light. These were interrupted when Italy became a major battlefield of World War II.

In the post-war period, the first volume of the official series Scavi di Ostia appeared in 1954; it was devoted to a topography of the town by Italo Gismondi and after a hiatus the research still continues today. Though untouched areas adjacent to the original excavations were left undisturbed awaiting a more precise dating of Roman pottery types, the "Baths of the Swimmer", named for the mosaic figure in the apodyterium, were meticulously excavated, in 1966–70 and 1974–75, in part as a training ground for young archaeologists and in part to establish a laboratory of well-understood finds as a teaching aid.

It has been estimated that two-thirds of the ancient town are as yet unexcavated.

In 2014, a geophysical survey using magnetometry, among other techniques, revealed the existence of a boundary wall on the north side of the Tiber enclosing an unexcavated area of the city containing three massive warehouses.

In 2025, excavations at Ostia Antica uncovered what may be the oldest Jewish ritual bath (mikveh) found outside Israel, dating to the late 4th or early 5th century. Located within a large Roman house, the bath features a deep immersion pool and an oil lamp with a menorah symbol, supporting its Jewish identification.

== Modern day ==
The site of Ostia Antica is open to the public. Finds from the excavation are housed onsite in the Museo Ostiense.

== Media ==
- Ostia was featured in the novels I, Claudius and Claudius the God, both written by British novelist Robert Graves. The novels include scenes set at Ostia spanning from the reign of Augustus to the reign of Claudius, including the departure of Agrippa to Syria and Claudius's reconstruction of the harbour. In the 1976 television series, Ostia was frequently mentioned but never actually seen.
- Ostia features in A War Within: The Gladiator by Nathan D. Maki. After an assassination attempt on Emperor Commodus the protagonists Antonius and Theudas escape by clinging to a barge on the Tiber, reaching Ostia, and stowing away on a trireme heading north to Ravenna.
- Ostia appears briefly towards the end of the Roman Empire section of the 1981 comedy film History of the World, Part I, where the main characters board a galleon (bearing the El Al logo) bound for Judaea. In the film, however, Ostia is only ever referred to as simply "the port".
- Ostia's beach and port serves as the location for the 1993 music video of the song "La solitudine" by Laura Pausini.
- Ostia is mentioned several times in the 2005 HBO/BBC historical drama series Rome.
- Ostia is mentioned in the 2000 film Gladiator, when the protagonist, Maximus, learns that his army is camped at Ostia and awaiting orders.
- One of the wonders buildable in the "Rise and Fall of the Roman Empire" mod for Sid Meier's Civilization III is called the "Portus Ostiae".
- Ostia is one of the inspirations for the setting of The Talos Principle.
- Ostia is the name of the Magic World's lost kingdom and the location of the gladiatorial games in the manga series Negima! Magister Negi Magi.
- Ostia is the name of the most important city of the Lycian Alliance in the Fire Emblem series.
- Ostia is mentioned in several novels in Lindsey Davis' Marcus Didius Falco series.
- Ostia is featured in the film Rome Adventure from 1962.
- Ostia is a central location in the children's novel series The Roman Mysteries by Caroline Lawrence, and its television adaption.

== Gallery ==
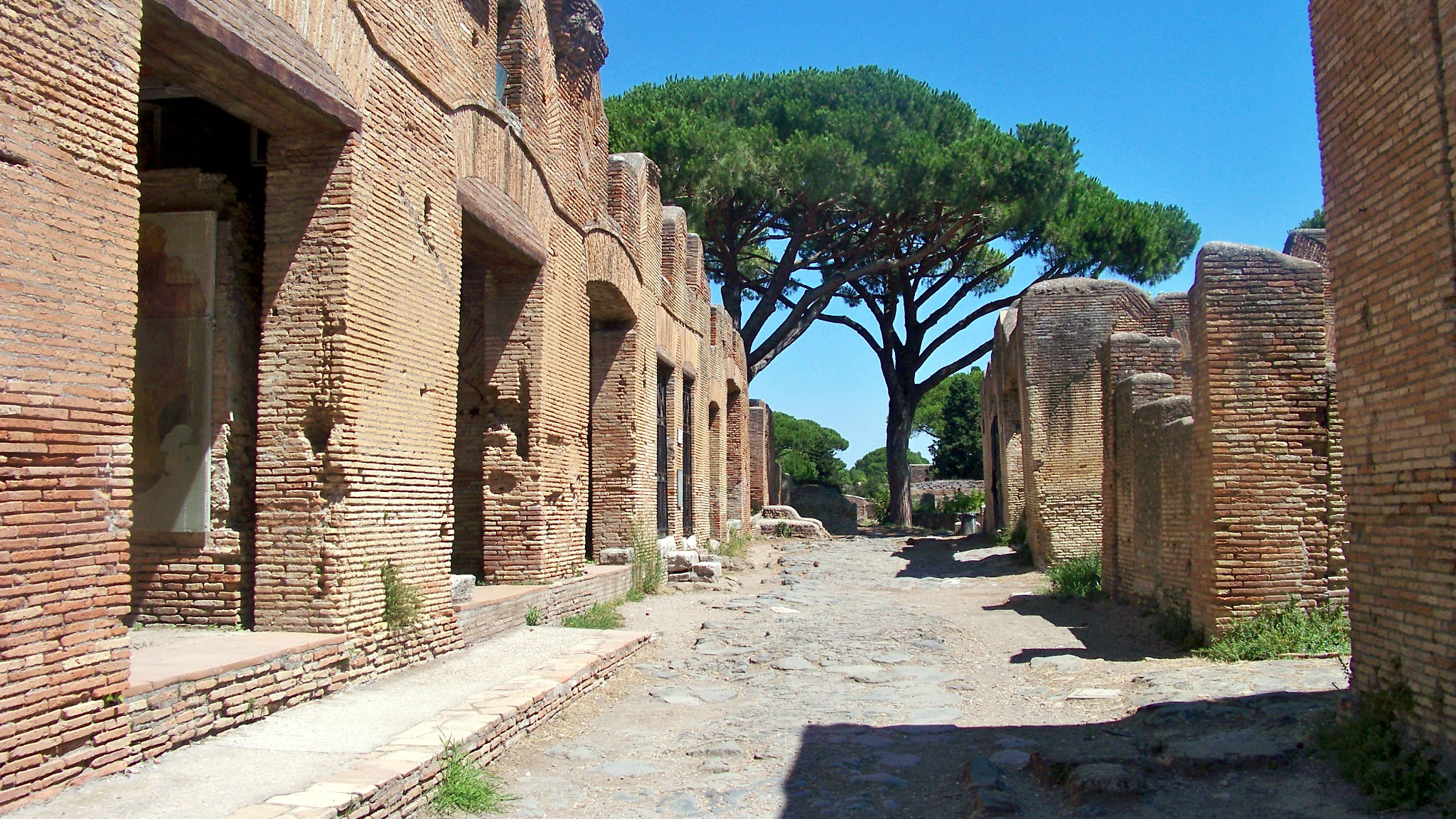
Street and dwellings

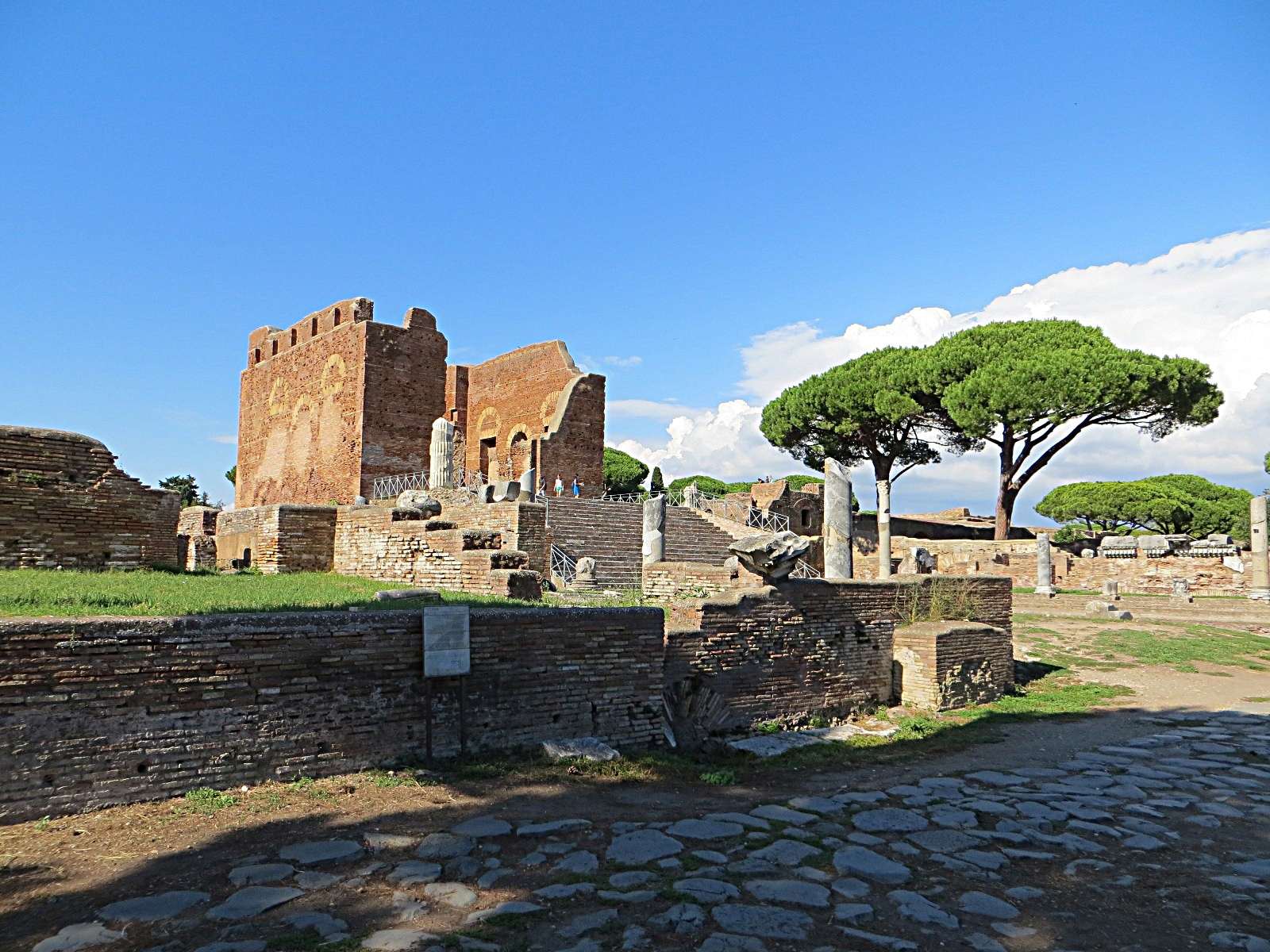
Temple of the Capitoline Triad: Jupiter, Juno, and Minerva

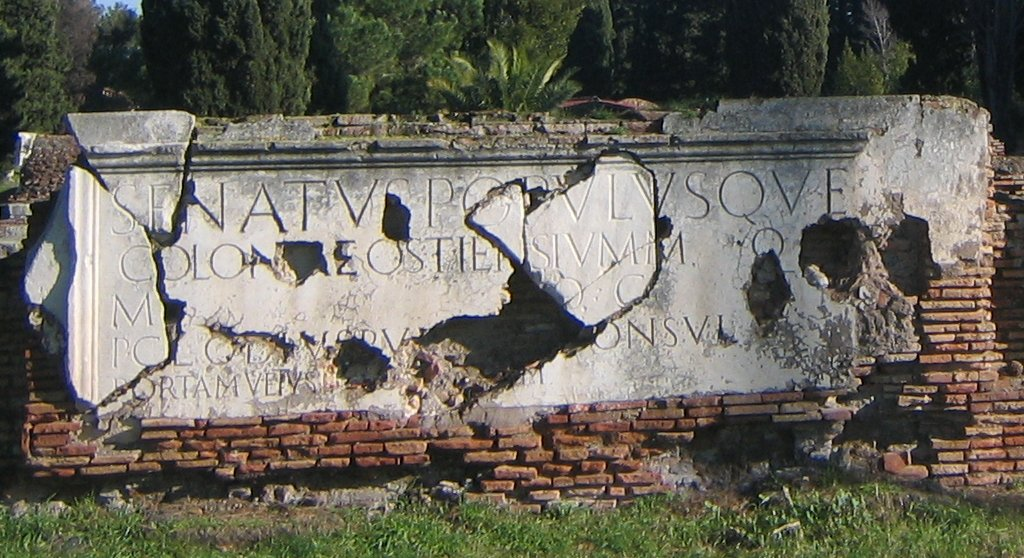
The inscription originally placed on the main gate

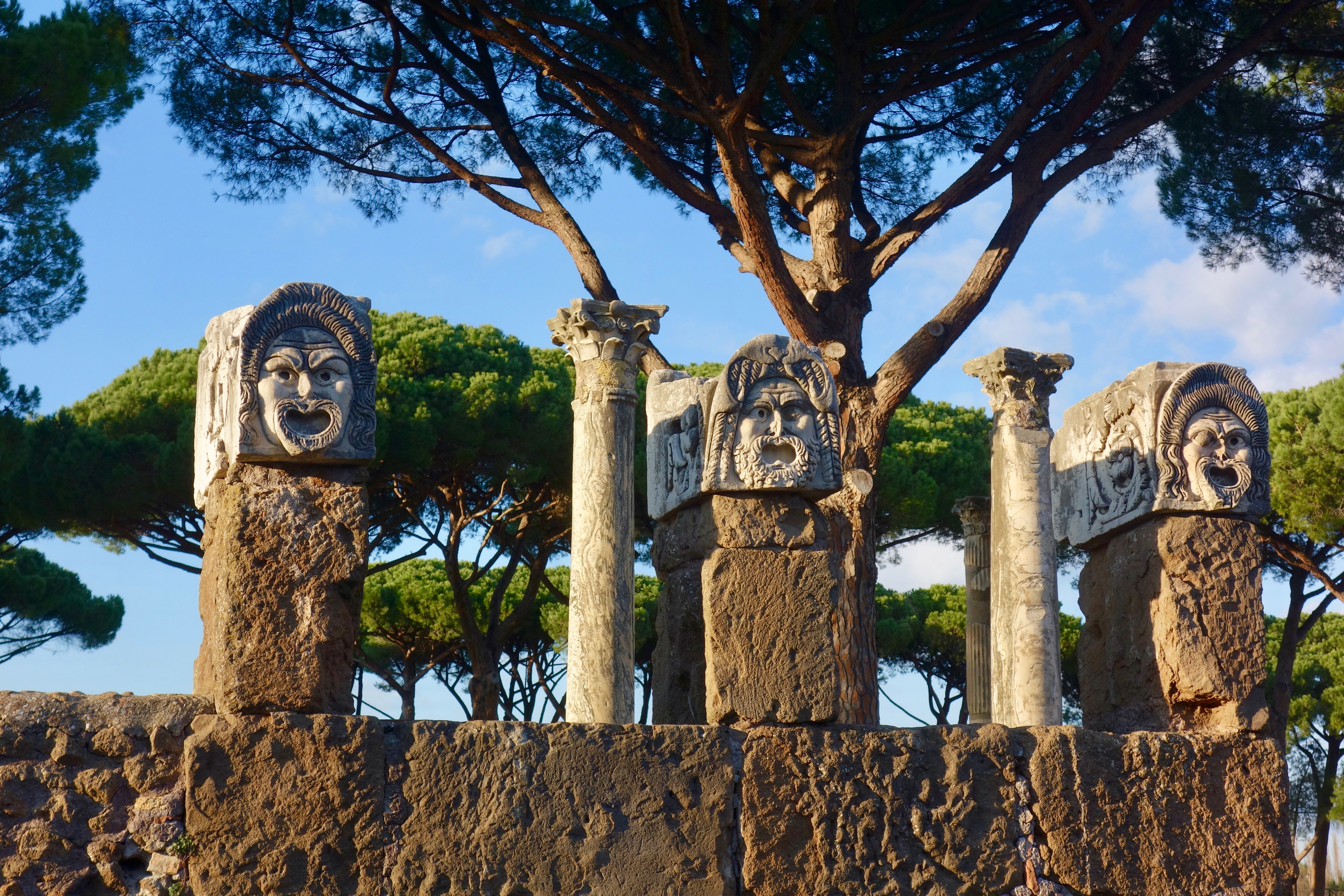
Theatrical masks, part of the architectural decoration of the Theatre (regio II, insula VII)

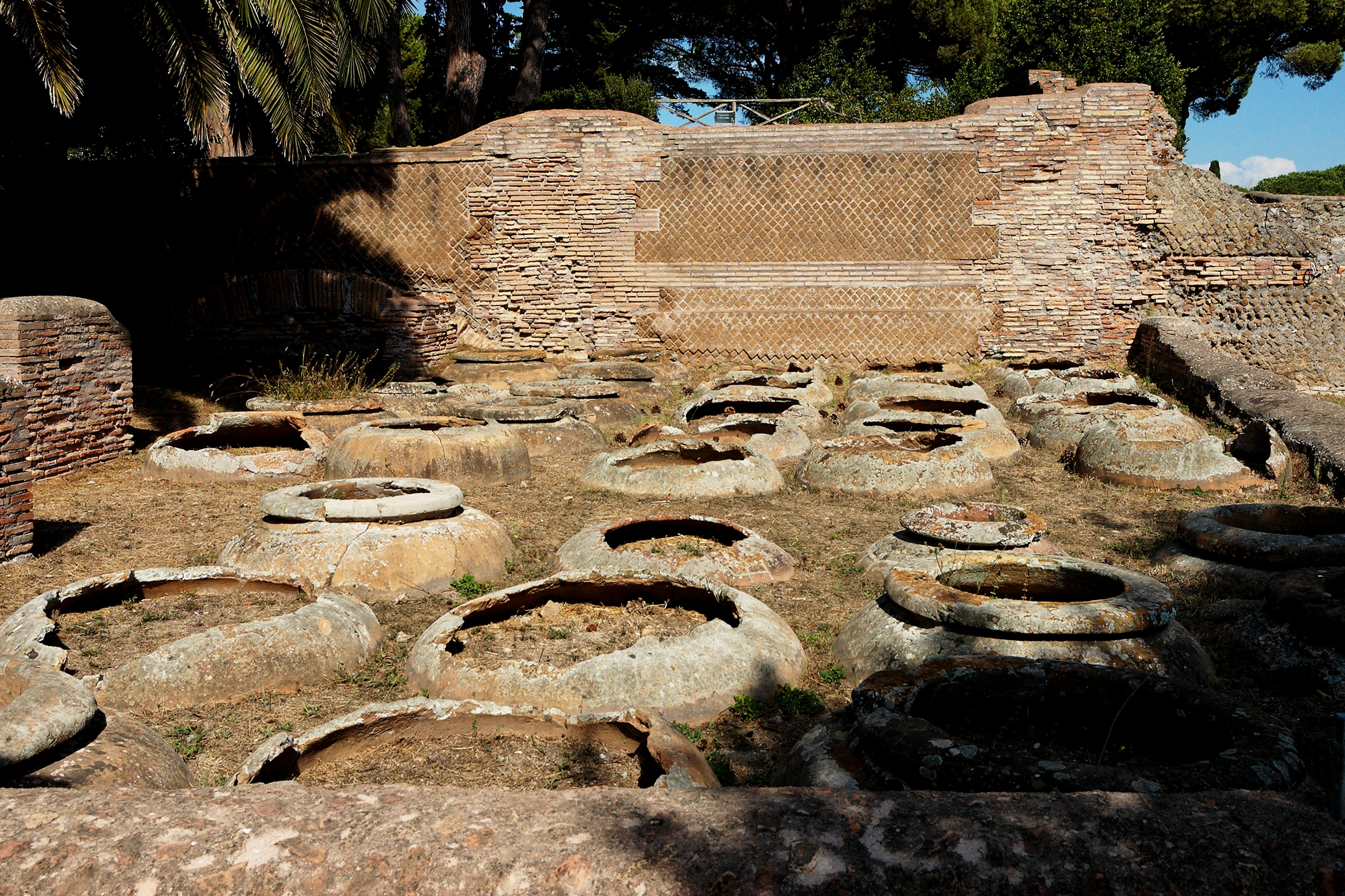
Dolia embedded in the ground at Caseggiato dei dolii

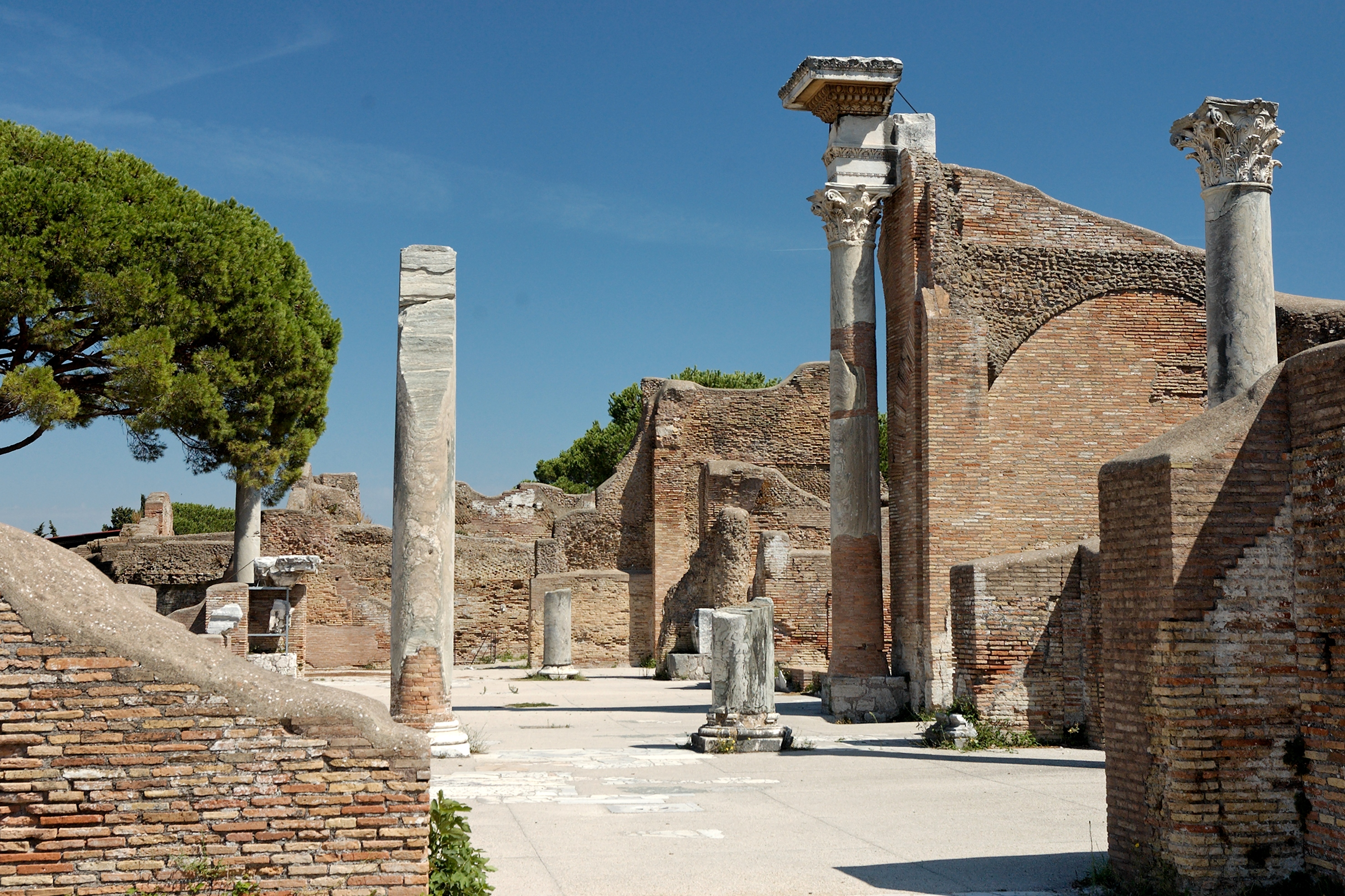
Forum Baths (frigidarium)

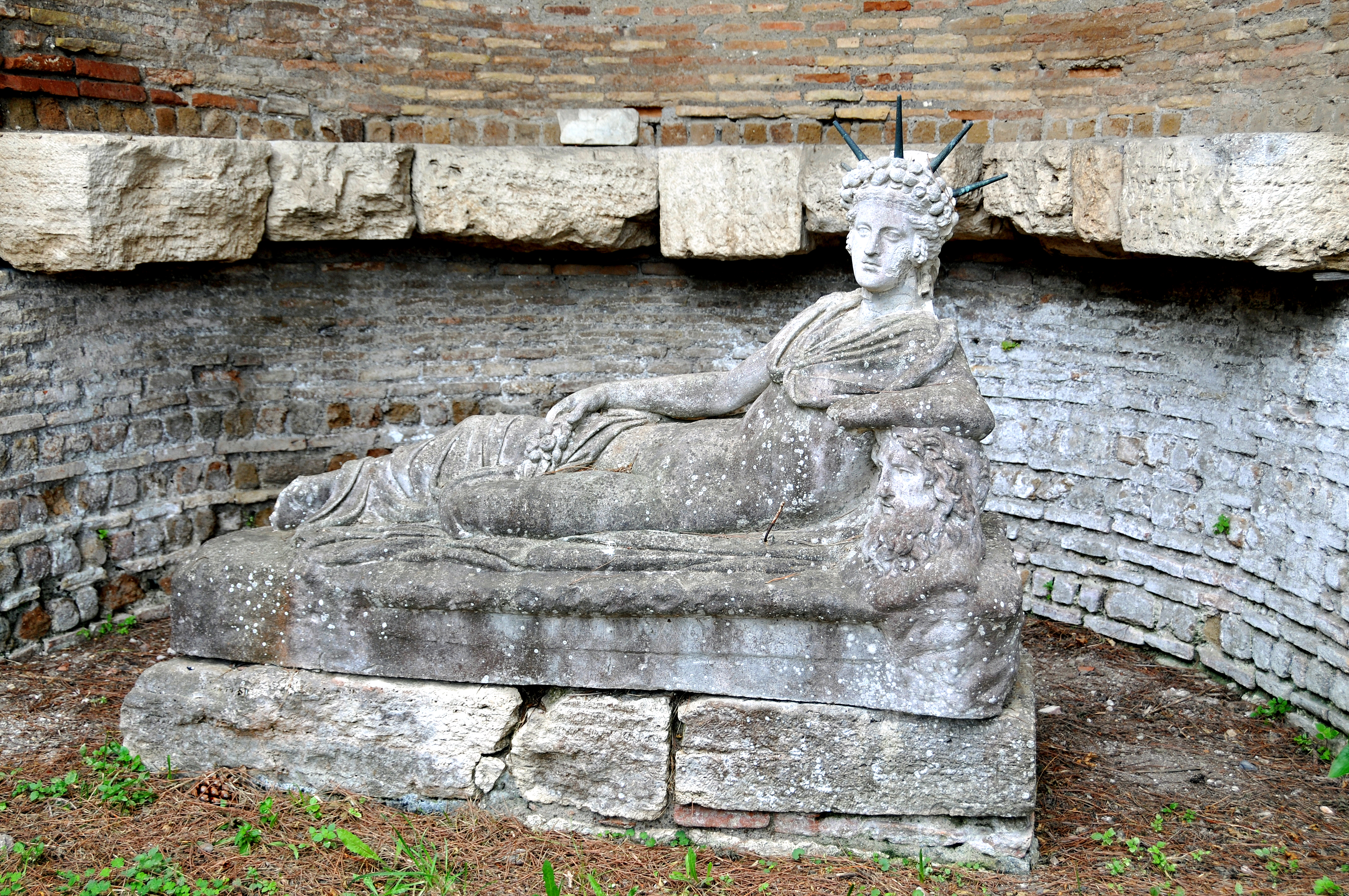
Statue of Attis in the Shrine of Attis

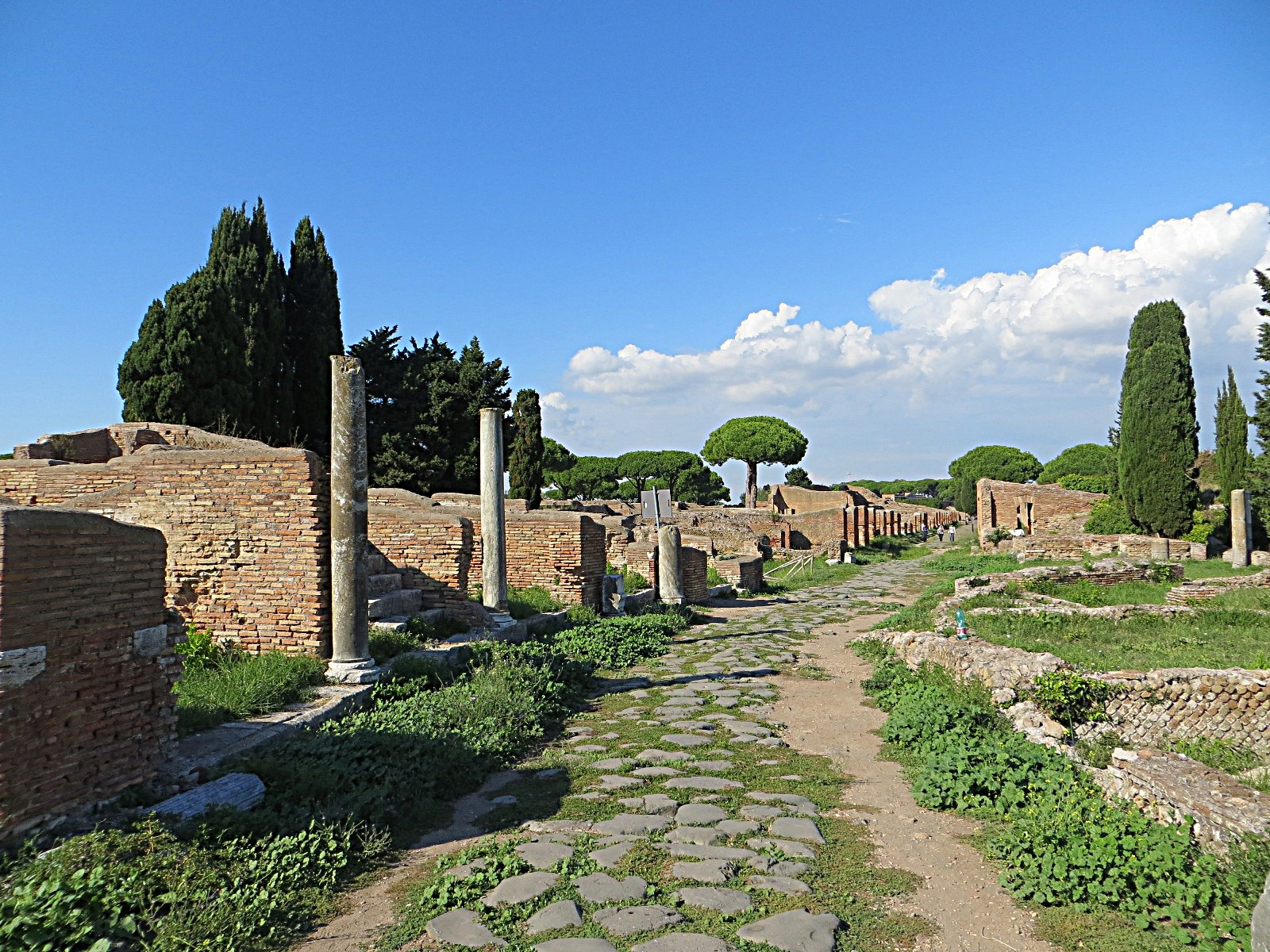
View of the archaeological site

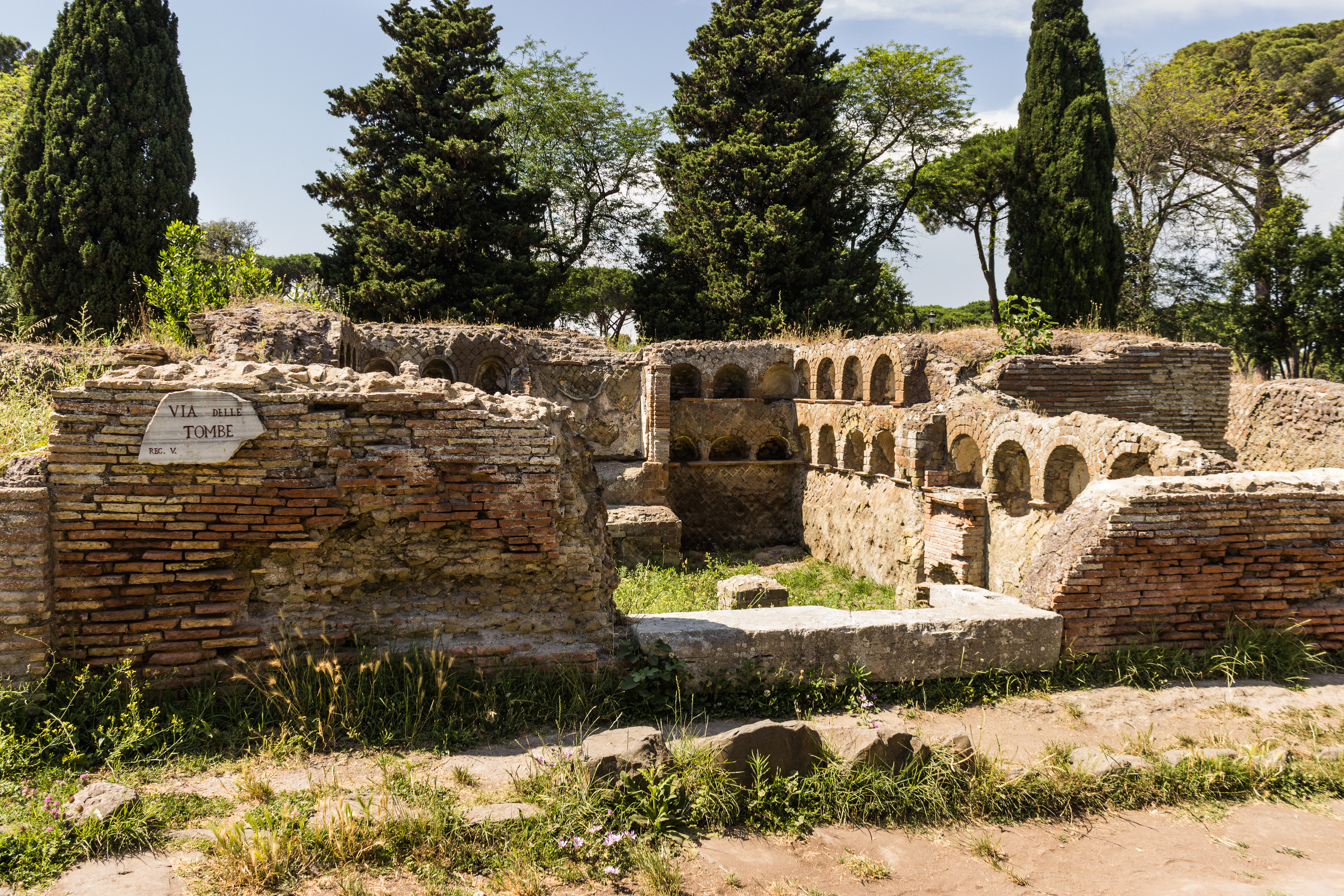
Via delle TombeV

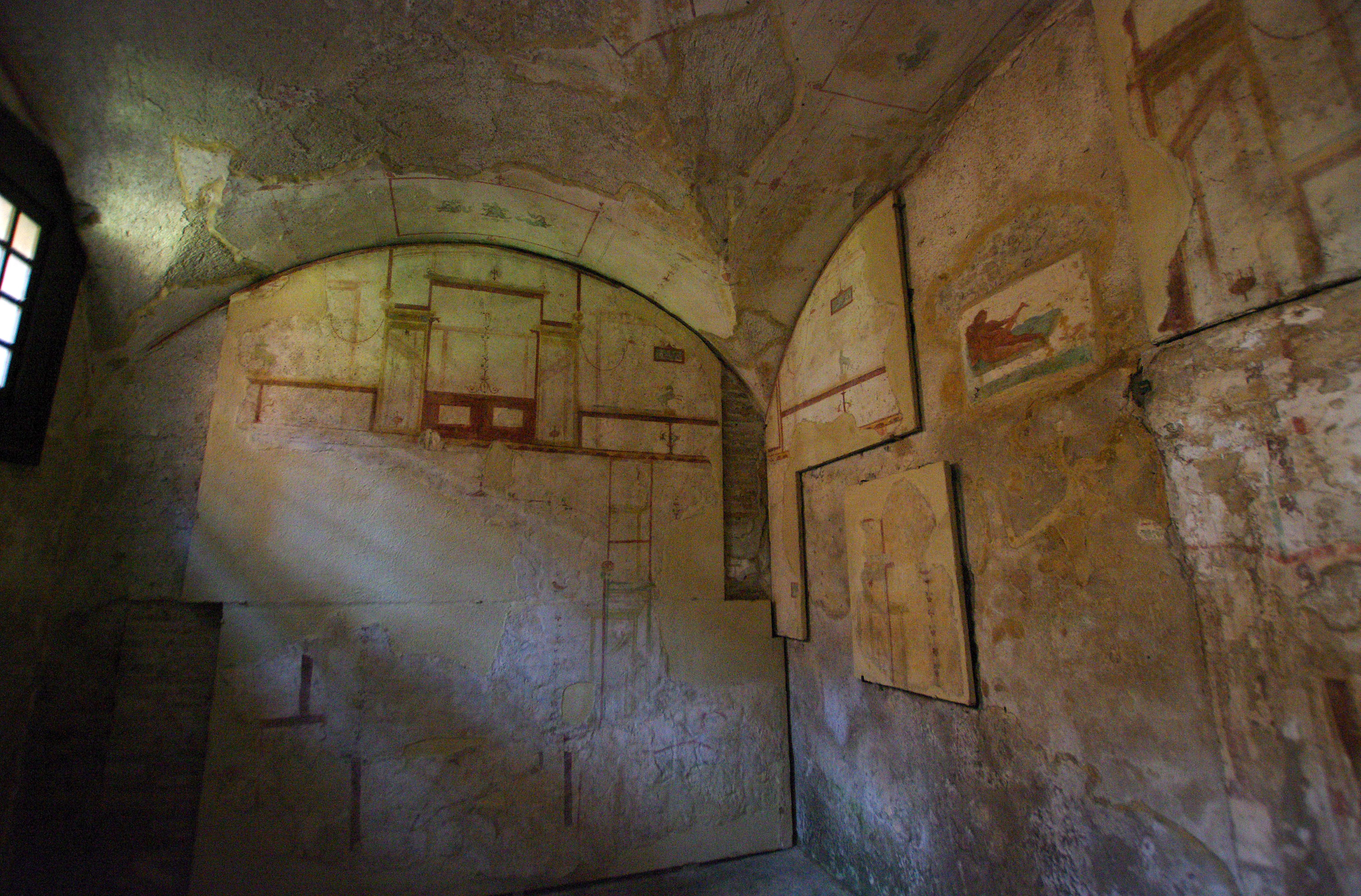
Room 5 of the House of the Painted Vaults. A wall painting of an erotic scene is on the south wall. 250 CE

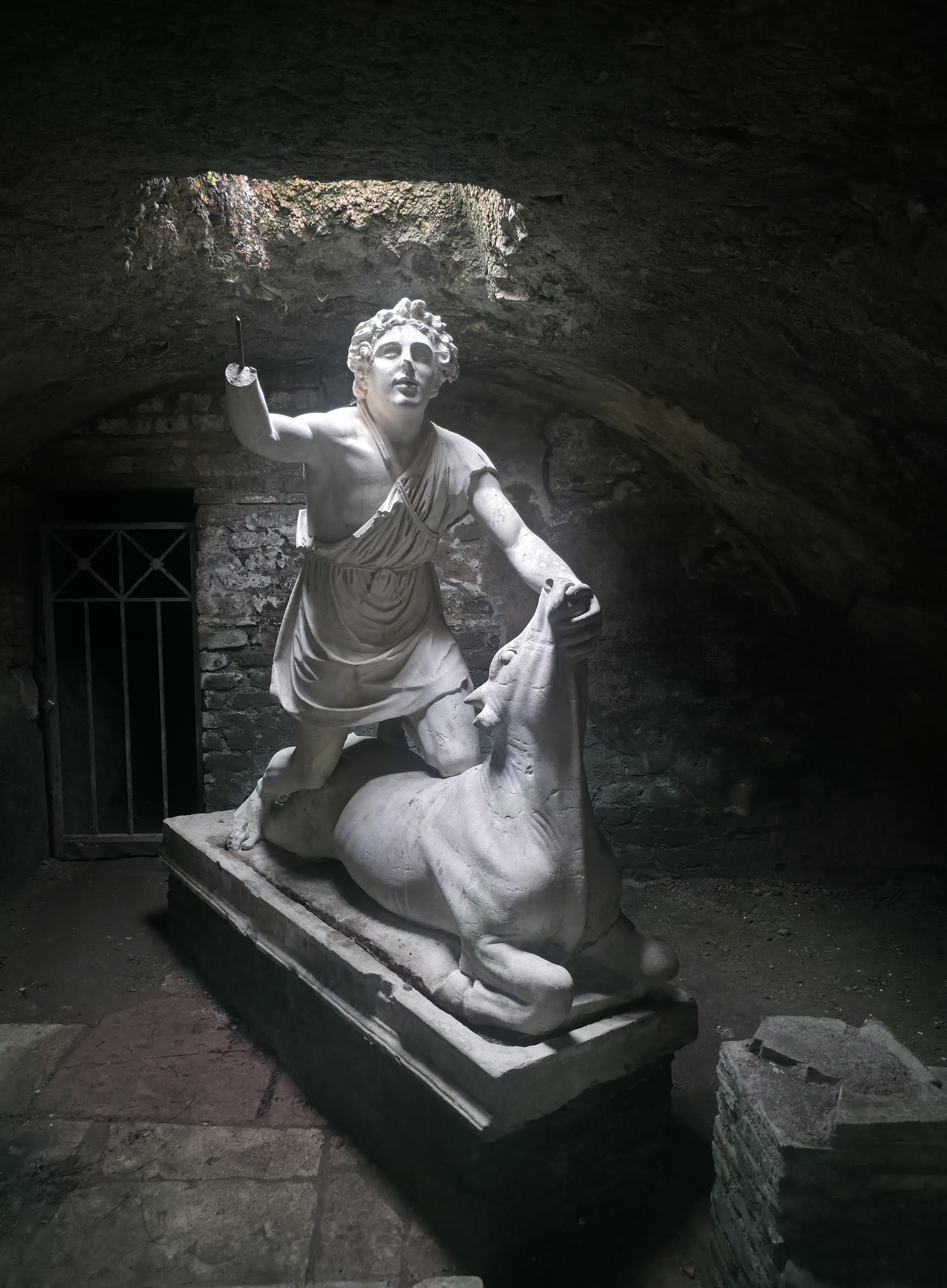
Tauroctony statue in Mithraeum

== See also ==
- Ostia - Harbour City of Ancient Rome
- Museo Archeologico Ostiense
- Temple of Bellona, Ostia
- Via Ostiensis
