= Temple of Bellona, Ostia =

Temple of Ostia

Temple of Bellona
- Tempio di Bellona (Italian)
- Shown within the environs of Rome (Ostia)
- Interactive map of Temple of Bellona
- 41°45′13″N 12°17′04″E
- Location: Ostia Antica, Italy

History
- Built: c. 117–138 CE (Late Hadrianic period)

Site notes
- Area: Regio IV, Insula I (Campo di Magna Mater)

The temple of Bellona is a temple or sacellum dedicated to the Italic goddess Bellona (possibly here syncretised with Magna Mater) in Ostia Antica.

It is to be found on the east side of the "Campo di Magna Mater" (Regio IV, Insula THE, n. 4) and is made up of a small building with cella preceded by two columns and three frontal steps. All, including the columns, is made of brick. The inside of the cella includes a low podium at the back, frescoed walls, a white mosaic floor and a marble threshold with the holes for the door pivots.

In the temple a relief of two pairs of feet was found, facing in opposite directions - perhaps a votive offering by a soldier who had departed for war and returned safely.

== Inscription ==
Found on the temple steps was the following inscription, naming Aulus Livius Proculus and the duovir Publius Lucilius Gamala Filius as rebuilding it (duoviral involvement proves it was on public land):

A(ulus) LIVIVS PROCVLVS P(ublius) LVCILIVS	Aulus Livius Proculus [and] Publius Lucilius
GAMALA F(ilius) IIVIR PRAEF(ectus) CAESAR(is)	Gamala Filius, duovir, prefect of Caesar,
LOCVM QVOD AEDES BELLONAE FIERET	the place which was a temple of Bellona
IMPENSA LICTORVM ET SERVORUM PVBLICORVM	at the expense of the lictors and public slaves
QVI IN CORPORE SVNT ADSIGNAVERVNT	who are undersigned in the box below
D(ecreto) D(ecurionum)	by the decree of the decurions
CVR(averunt)	looked after
M(arco) NAEVIO FRVCTO ET [---]	By/to Marcus Naevius Fructus and ...

and, on the reverse

NVMINI BELLONAE SACR(um)	holy to the numens of Bellona
DEC(reto) DEC(urionum) PVBLICE LOCO ADSIGNAT(o),	marked as public land by the decree of the public decuriones,
LICTORES VIATOR(es) ET HONORE VSI ET	the lictors, viators and in honour of its use
LIBERTI COLON(iae) ET SERV(i) PVBLICI CORPOR(ati)	both the freedmen of the colony and the corporation of public slaves
OPERE AMPLIATO	the whole work
SVA PECVNIA RESTITVERVNT	restored from their own resources

== See also ==
- List of Ancient Roman temples
