= The Nutcracker and the Four Realms (soundtrack) =

The Nutcracker and the Four Realms (Original Motion Picture Soundtrack)

Film score by James Newton Howard
- Released: October 26, 2018
- Recorded: 2017–2018
- Studio: Abbey Road Studios, London
- Genre: Classical; orchestral
- Length: 1:06:36
- Label: Walt Disney
- Producer: James Newton Howard

James Newton Howard chronology
Red Sparrow (2018)	The Nutcracker and the Four Realms (2018)	Fantastic Beasts: The Crimes of Grindelwald (2018)

The Nutcracker and the Four Realms (Original Motion Picture Soundtrack) is the score album composed and produced by James Newton Howard for the 2018 film of the same name. The film marked Howard's second score for a live-action Disney film after Maleficent (2014). Howard, about the film score, described it as "The score is very traditional – a big orchestra score – with lots of woodwinds and strings, plus tinkle bells and celeste and chorale music".

Gustavo Dudamel conducted the London Philharmonia Orchestra for the film score, that was recorded at the Abbey Road Studios, London. Howard adapted excerpts from Tchaikovsky's ballet The Nutcracker (1892), besides composing original music. The adaptation of Tchaikovsky's "The Nutcracker Suite" is performed by piano soloist Lang Lang. In addition to the score, an original song "Fall on Me" sung by Andrea Bocelli and his son Matteo Bocelli was premiered on Dancing with the Stars' "Disney Night" on October 22, 2018. The album was released on October 26, 2018, by Walt Disney Records.

== Reception ==
The score received positive critical response, with praise directed on the integration and adaptation of Tchaikovsky's music from the ballet into the film. Zanobard Reviews wrote "The Nutcracker And The Four Realms is a pretty amazing album. James Newton Howard expertly blends modern score styles with the classical setting of the original Nutcracker, and even goes so far as to include some of Tchaikovsky's motifs too. They don't appear much though, which is probably a good thing as it allows Howard's new music to shine that much brighter. What could have been better perhaps was the action section of the album, which while highly enjoyable lacked thematic elements and as a result was a tad lackluster at times when it could have been incredible. This is only a minor grievance however, as overall Howard's score here is simply sublime." James Southall of Movie Wave wrote "Howard makes a valiant effort throughout the score to ensure his own voice shines through alongside Tchaikovsky's but really, it's a battle he was never going to win and – while it contains some wonderful highlights – the music just never quite clicks together to form that great fantasy score we were all hoping for."

Aisha Harris of The New York Times, called the score "pleasant", David Rooney of The Hollywood Reporter wrote "an almost nonstop flood of lush music that shuffles Tchaikovsky with James Newton Howard". Filmtracks.com wrote " Most of the score for The Nutcracker and the Four Realms plays like a standard Howard children's effort, especially with so much of it dainty in a cheery sense, and the fantasy elements are skewed towards a light-hearted tone akin to Joel McNeely's Tinker Bell scores. The mice-related cues, for instance, embody this playfulness well. Listeners desiring the hefty Howard bravado of his magnificent fantasy triumphs will be pleased that his style really doesn't overlap in classical methodology with that of Tchaikovsky, yielding a handful of genuinely appealing cues of pure Howard action and drama. A strong, 30-minute presentation of primarily his material would make the listening experience for The Nutcracker and the Four Realms an easy recommendation, which is ironic considering that most casual buyers will be seeking the decent but not spectacular Tchaikovsky interpolations and the questionable, eye-rolling song by the Bocellis."

== Track listing ==
No.	Title	Length
1.	"The Nutcracker and The Four Realms"	02:02
2.	"Presents From Mother"	05:51
3.	"Drosselmeyer"	02:04
4.	"Clara's New World"	04:45
5.	"Mouserinks"	04:12
6.	"Just a Few Questions"	01:45
7.	"Sugar Plum and Clara"	07:42
8.	"The Fourth Realm"	03:01
9.	"The Polichinelles"	01:13
10.	"Clara Finds The Key"	06:42
11.	"The Waterfall"	03:21
12.	"The Bridge Fight"	02:21
13.	"Clockwork Mice"	01:31
14.	"The Machine Room Fight"	05:19
15.	"Queen Clara"	06:29
16.	"The Nutcracker Suite" (Lang Lang)	03:59
17.	"Fall on Me" (Andrea Bocelli and Matteo Bocelli)	04:19
Total length:		01:06:36

== Charts ==
Chart (2018)	Peak position
UK Soundtrack Albums (OCC)	32
US Billboard 200	87
US Classical Albums (Billboard)	12
US Soundtrack Albums (Billboard)	25

== Release history ==
Region	Title	Date	Catalog Code	Ref.
United States	The Nutcracker And The Four Realms (Original Motion Picture Soundtrack)	October 26, 2018	D002864802	
United Kingdom	The Nutcracker And The Four Realms (Original Motion Picture Soundtrack)	October 26, 2018	8739211	
Australia	The Nutcracker And The Four Realms (Original Motion Picture Soundtrack)	November 2, 2018	8739211	
Europe	The Nutcracker And The Four Realms (Original Motion Picture Soundtrack)	November 6, 2018	8739211	
Poland	The Nutcracker And The Four Realms (Original Motion Picture Soundtrack)	November 16, 2018	8739211	
Germany	Der Nussknacker Und Die Vier Reiche (Original Film Soundtrack)	November 30, 2018	050087405410	
Austria	Der Nussknacker Und Die Vier Reiche (Original Film Soundtrack)	November 30, 2018	050087405410	
Switzerland	Der Nussknacker Und Die Vier Reiche (Original Film Soundtrack)	December 14, 2018	050087405410	
France	Casse-noisette et les quatre royaumes (Bande originale du film)	November 23, 2018	874 053-9	
