= Enemies at Home =

2014 historical crime novel by Lindsey Davis

- Front cover of UK hardback
- Author: Lindsey Davis
- Series: Flavia Albia (Falco: A New Generation)
- Genre: historical mystery crime novel
- Publisher: Hodder & Stoughton
- Publication date: 24 April 2014
- Publication place: UK
- Pages: 385
- ISBN: 978-1-4447-6658-5
- Preceded by: The Ides of April
- Followed by: Deadly Election

Enemies at Home is a 2014 historical mystery crime novel by Lindsey Davis and the second book of the Flavia Alba Mysteries (Falco: The New Generation) series. Set in Ancient Rome beginning in June AD 89, two months after the events of The Ides of April (2013), the novel stars Flavia Albia, the British-born adopted daughter of Marcus Didius Falco (the hero of the author's 20-volume Marcus Didius Falco Mysteries series, published from 1989 to 2010). Albia, a widow, works as a "delatrix" (a detective or private informer) in ancient Rome, like Falco. The book's cover bears an image of two silver cups, one toppled, and a broken rope. It carries the strapline: "A Flavia Albia Novel".

== Connections to the Falco series ==
Falco is not mentioned in "The Cast", but his past history and his habits are discussed throughout conversations between Albia, her client the aedile Faustus, his slave Dromo and Albia's two uncles (revealed to be Falco's associates/brothers-in-law Quintus and Aulus, who now work as barristers and senators). Besides, the list includes his partner Helena Justina ("a force to be reckoned with"), her two brothers and their wives and ex-wives, and the "very old waiter" Apollonius. Lucius Petronius Longus, Falco's friend is revealed to have continued his search for Florius, only to have given up and retired from work with the vigiles, while Albia's maternal grandparents (Helena's parents) are absent, implying that they are deceased.

The fate of some of Albia's adopted relatives, the Camilii and the Didii, following the events of Nemesis, and how Falco's family was affected by the Vesuvius eruption of 79 AD and the Saepta Julia fire of 80 AD, are also recalled by Albia. Albia also reveals that her late husband Lentullus met his untimely end in "an accident".

== Plot summary ==
It is June in the year 89 AD, the 9th year of the reign of Domitian, and Rome is in an uproar when a newly married couple living in an apartment on the Esquiline — Valerius Aviola and Mucia Lucilia — are found strangled in bed. One of their slave porters has been brutally bludgeoned and the family silver is missing. The remaining slaves of the Aviola household (including the injured porter, Nicostratus) are naturally suspected of being complicit in the seemingly apparent murder of their masters and the theft of the silverware, and (with the exception of Myla, a slave and Polycarpus, the family steward) manage to flee to the sanctuary of the Temple of Ceres.

The 2nd Vigiles Cohort is charged with investigating, but the cohort tribune Titianus gives up, and the temple's authorities are unenthusiastic about harbouring potential murderers (especially slaves who have murdered their owners) so an aedile, Tiberius Manlius Faustus, is called in to investigate. Faustus persuades Flavia Albia, the adopted daughter of Marcus Didius Falco and a delatrix in her own right, to help, with the hope that she could clear the names of the slaves. Flavia, having fled her family at Ostia out of outright boredom whilst on holiday, agrees to Faustus' request.

At the Esquiline, Albia talks to Fauna, a neighbour, and learns that the entire household had been in a tumult for many nights, including the night of the murder itself. The former steward Polycarpus and the Aviola slaves who managed to flee to the Temple of Ceres tell Albia that it was a botched robbery gone wrong, but Albia doubts their statements — why was Nicostratus bludgeoned, but not strangled like his owners? and if the slaves were within earshot of the murdered couple's bedroom, why did they not rush out to help them? With the help of Faustus and her uncle Quintus, Albia soon discovers a tangled web of dark secrets, vengeance, lust and rivalry not just amongst the Aviola slaves, but within the family itself: Valerius Aviola's first wife, Galla, seems belligerent enough to want him dead after having lost him to her best friend, the late Mucia Lucilia. Albia discovers that some of the slaves were originally Mucia's own staff, and both Aviola and Lucilia were planning to sell some of them off as part of a redundancy exercise, beginning with Myla, with whom Valerius used to sleep with prior to marrying Lucilia. Albia also discovers sexual tensions over Amaranta, a female slave, between three male slaves: Onesimus, a steward of Lucilia's who had been sent away; Phaedrus, another porter; and Daphnus, a server. Phaedrus also had a feud with Nicostratus, who by now has died of his injuries. Equally, Galla's cousin, the executor of Valerius' will, disliked Lucilia (because Aviola was divorced from Galla) and planned to replace his slave steward Gratus with Polycarpus. Gratus tells Albia that Myla may have given birth to many children after Aviola and Polycarpus forced themselves on her.

With so many conflicts within the Aviola household, Albia first suspects that someone either wanted to steal the silver or that Aviola's ex-wife put out a contract on him and Lucilia, so she investigates the local racketeers in the vicinity, the Rabirii. Titianus, Albia and Faustus track down a nephew of the Rabirii crime lord named Roscius, who admits that he was in the Aviola apartment but while he could not find the silver, he did see the bodies of the murdered couple. He also mentions that when he was there, the house was unusually quiet and dark, in contrast to Fauna's deposition.

Crises soon mar the investigations — Quintus is brutally assaulted, apparently by the Rabirii in the Aventine, but the 4th Vigiles Cohort apprehend one of the attackers. When the Rabirii fail to save the man, this sparks off a deadly gang war on the Esquiline, but Albia and the rest of her contacts survive. However, Polycarpus is soon found strangled in the same manner as his former owners in his own apartment above the former Aviola residence — ruling out Polycarpus and the fugitive slaves as the killer or killers. Albia attends Polycarpus' wake, and discovers that Polycarpus was loyal to his late master (and former mistress Galla), which was reciprocated by the Aviola family. Galla did not bear much of a grudge against Lucilia or Aviola either, nor do her children, so neither Polycarpus, Galla nor her children would have had a motive for Aviola's death. But when Polycarpus' widow, Graecina attempts to send Myla to the slave market, Myla scalds her with hot water, screams that she killed Aviola and Lucilia, and then drowns herself in the Tiber.

Albia, Fauna and Galla rush back the apartment to tend to Graecina, where over drinks the three women tell Albia of the existence of an old well in the courtyard. Graecina reveals clues implicating Cosmus, a slave owned by her, in the murders of the Aviola couple and Polycarpus. Albia also discovers that Cosmus had a violent streak, marking him as a potential killer. Albia realises that the Aviola silverware is hidden in the well, and discovers that the old well has been freshly sealed with a wooden cover, using a plank covered with dried blood. She dredges up the Aviola silverware from the well and to celebrate her discovery with Faustus and his slave Dromo even drinks wine poured into one of the chalices from the well. For her efforts, the grateful Aviola family give a small pouch of coins to Albia.

Albia interrogates the slaves one last time and eventually discovers the truth: Cosmus was Myla's son and tried to compel Aviola to keep Myla and the other slaves on. When Aviola refused, Cosmus strangled him along with Lucilia, but was found out by Polycarpus, who had him detained alone in the kitchen, probably just before Roscius broke in. Polycarpus decided to fake a robbery to protect Cosmus and the other slaves, just as Roscius and his men attempted to rob the apartment. To make it more convincing, Nicostratus was roughed up by the other slaves, but Phaedrus went too far, eventually resulting in Nicostratus' death. Phaedrus used a plank to beat up Nicostratus, which was then used to seal the well with the silverware inside it. Despite Polycarpus' best attempts to cover up his involvement in the double murder, Cosmus may have argued over the silver with Polycarpus, and eventually strangled him too in a fit of rage. Being Cosmus' mother, Myla may well have tried to shield him through her suicide.

For their confessions, Albia decides to commend Amaranta, Daphnus and his witless brother Melander for exoneration, but she implies that the rest would not be so lucky, least of all the now fugitive Cosmus, since they all were negligent in their duty to protect their owners. Albia writes a report for Faustus, advises the long-suffering Titianus to send out a warrant for Cosmus' arrest, and then returns home to Fountain Court, but it is not the end yet. Halfway up, Albia suddenly falls violently ill, sickened from having drunk wine mixed with tainted water from the well, but is saved and nursed back to health by Faustus. The book ends with Helena, Albia's adopted mother, taking Albia back to Ostia for treatment, and Albia herself meditating on Faustus' motives for tending to her, and she admits that she longs to see him again.

== Major themes ==
- The lives and predicament of slaves in imperial Rome
- Albia's (seemingly) deepening relationship with Tiberius Manlius Faustus, an aedile

== Reception ==
In a review, Publishers Weekly praised the setting, but noted that the "clues to the killer’s identity" were "less than fair". Booklist wrote that the dialogue was "breezy, free of faux-historical grammatical constructions" and highlighted the prose as "perhaps the most appealing thing". Kirkus Reviews called it a "solidly plotted traditional whodunit with some nice historical touches".
