= Sì (Andrea Bocelli album) =

Studio album by Andrea Bocelli
- Released: 26 October 2018
- Length: 48:02
- Label: Sugar; Decca
- Producer: Bob Ezrin; Mauro Malavasi; Pierpaolo Guerrini

Andrea Bocelli chronology
Romanza (20th Anniversary Edition) (2016)	Sì (2018)	Believe (2020)

Singles from Sì
- 1. "Fall on Me" Released: 20 September 2018; 2. "If Only" Released: 8 December 2018; 3. "Amo Soltanto Te / This Is The Only Time" Released: 22 February 2019

Sì is the sixteenth studio album by Italian tenor Andrea Bocelli, released on 26 October 2018. It is Bocelli's first album of original material in 14 years, his last being Andrea (2004). Bocelli duets with his son Matteo Bocelli on "Fall on Me", and Ed Sheeran provides vocals on and also co-wrote "Amo soltanto te", which marks the second collaboration between Bocelli and Sheeran after the latter's "Perfect Symphony" in 2017. Dua Lipa and Josh Groban also appear on the album.

The deluxe edition of the album includes several bonus tracks, while another deluxe edition adds a bonus disc featuring mostly Spanish versions of the main tracks, as well as a French version of "Ali di libertà" and a Mandarin version of "If Only" with Taiwanese singer A-Mei. The album was BBC Radio 2's Album of the Week, with several of the tracks making their world premieres on the network.

The album debuted at number one on the UK Albums Chart and US Billboard 200, becoming Bocelli's first number-one album in both countries. It is the first classical album to peak at number one in 20 years in the United Kingdom and 10 years in the United States. Si was nominated for the Grammy Award for Best Traditional Pop Vocal Album at the 62nd Annual Grammy Awards.

On 8 November 2019, Bocelli released Si Forever: The Diamond Edition, an extended deluxe edition of the album featuring five new tracks including duets with Ellie Goulding and Jennifer Garner.

== Background ==
Bocelli stated that he and his team of songwriters and producers have found and set aside songs to work on for years, but did not actually record them until Sì. Bocelli explained that as his family is the "most important reference point in his life", he wanted to "celebrate" them on the album—including his son Matteo on "Fall on Me", while his other son Amos contributes piano on the two acoustic bonus tracks, and the song "Vivo" is dedicated to Bocelli's wife Veronica.

== Promotion ==
"Fall on Me" also appears over the end credits of the Disney film The Nutcracker and the Four Realms, the soundtrack of which was released the same day as Sì.

== Commercial performance ==
Sì debuted atop the US Billboard 200 with 126,000 album-equivalent units (of which 123,000 were pure album sales). It is Bocelli's first US number-one album, and the first classical album to do so since Josh Groban's Noël in January 2008.

In the United Kingdom, Sì debuted at number one with sales of 25,829 copies, making it Bocelli's 11th top 10 album. It is also the first classical album to reach the top since James Horner's album Titanic: Music from the Motion Picture in 1998.

== Track listing ==
No.	Title	Writer(s)	Producer(s)	Length
1.	"Ali di libertà"	Davide Esposito	Bob Ezrin	3:32
2.	"Amo soltanto te" (featuring Ed Sheeran)	Edward Sheeran; Tiziano Ferro; Matt Sheeran	Ezrin	3:20
3.	"Un'anima"	Richard Blaskey; Daniel McAlister	Ezrin	4:31
4.	"If Only" (featuring Dua Lipa)	Luciano Quarantotto; Francesco Sartori; Mauro Malavasi; Shridhar Solanki	Ezrin; Malavasi	3:37
5.	"Gloria the Gift of Life"	Jonas Myrin; Edmond Cash; Robert Ezrin	Ezrin	3:47
6.	"Fall on Me" (with Matteo Bocelli)	Chad Vaccarino; Ian Axel; Fortunato Zampaglione; Matteo Bocelli	Ezrin	4:16
7.	"We Will Meet Once Again" (with Josh Groban)	Joshua Groban; Jacqueline Nemorin; Marco Guazzone; Tobias Gad	Bernie Herms	3:55
8.	"I Am Here" ("Sono Qui" English version)	Pierpaolo Guerrini; Shridhar Solanki	Ezrin; Guerrini	3:49
9.	"Vertigo"	Raffaele Gualazzi	Malavasi	4:35
10.	"Vivo"	Riccardo Del Turco	Guerrini	4:22
11.	"Dormi dormi"	Malavasi	Ezrin; Malavasi	4:06
12.	"Ave Maria pietas" (with Aida Garifullina)	Danijel Vuletic; Malavasi	Ezrin; Malavasi	4:12
Total length:				48:02

Bonus tracks
No.	Title	Writer(s)	Producer(s)	Length
13.	"Meditation"	Andrea Bocelli; Malavasi; Jules Massenet	Ezrin	4:09
14.	"Miele impuro"	Emilio Rentocchini; Sartori	Ezrin	3:09
15.	"Sono qui" (acoustic version)	Quarantotto; Sartori; Malavasi	Guerrini	4:26
16.	"Ali di libertà" (acoustic version)	Esposito	Guerrini	3:33
17.	"Fall on Me" (with Matteo Bocelli) (English version)	Vaccarino; Axel; Zampaglione; Bocelli	Ezrin	4:18
Total length:				67:37

Deluxe edition bonus disc
No.	Title	Length
1.	"Alas de libertad" ("Ali di libertà" Spanish version)	3:32
2.	"Tu eres mi tesoro" ("If Only" Spanish version)	3:39
3.	"Gloria por la vida" ("Gloria the Gift of Life" Spanish version)	3:47
4.	"Ven a mi" (with Matteo Bocelli) ("Fall on Me" Spanish version)	4:18
5.	"Estoy aquì" ("Sono qui" Spanish version)	3:49
6.	"Vivo otra vez contigo" ("Vivo" Spanish version)	4:22
7.	"Duerme duerme" ("Dormi dormi" Spanish version)	4:06
8.	"Un rêve de liberté" ("Ali di libertà" French version)	3:30
9.	"If Only" (Mandarin version) (with A-Mei)	3:37
Total length:		34:40

== Charts ==
=== Weekly charts ===
Chart (2018–19)	Peak position
Australian Albums (ARIA)	7
Austrian Albums (Ö3 Austria)	10
Belgian Albums (Ultratop Flanders)	3
Belgian Albums (Ultratop Wallonia)	49
Canadian Albums (Billboard)	3
Czech Albums (ČNS IFPI)	18
Dutch Albums (Album Top 100)	7
German Albums (Offizielle Top 100)	10
Greek Albums (IFPI Greece)	8
Hungarian Albums (MAHASZ)	11
Irish Albums (IRMA)	3
Italian Albums (FIMI)	6
Japanese Albums (Oricon)	16
New Zealand Albums (RMNZ)	6
Polish Albums (ZPAV)	6
Portuguese Albums (AFP)	15
Scottish Albums (OCC)	1
Slovak Albums (ČNS IFPI)	8
South Korean Albums (Gaon)	73
South Korean International Albums (Circle)	3
Spanish Albums (PROMUSICAE)	22
Swiss Albums (Schweizer Hitparade)	10
UK Albums (OCC)	1
US Billboard 200	1
US Top Classical Albums (Billboard)	1

=== Year-end charts ===
Chart (2018)	Position
Australian Albums (ARIA)	81
Belgian Albums (Ultratop Flanders)	48
Dutch Albums (MegaCharts)	98
German Albums (Offizielle Top 100)	95
Irish Albums (IRMA)	18
Italian Albums (FIMI)	49
Polish Albums (ZPAV)	31
UK Albums (OCC)	12
US Top Classical Albums (Billboard)	1

Chart (2019)	Position
US Top Classical Albums (Billboard)	1

Chart (2020)	Position
US Top Classical Albums (Billboard)	26

== Certifications ==
Region	Certification	Certified units/sales
Italy (FIMI)	Gold	25,000^{‡}
Poland (ZPAV)	2× Platinum	40,000^{‡}
United Kingdom (BPI)	Gold	100,000^{‡}
^{‡} Sales+streaming figures based on certification alone.

== See also ==
- List of artists who have achieved simultaneous UK and US number-one hits
- List of Billboard 200 number-one albums of 2018
- List of UK Albums Chart number ones of the 2010s
