= Alexandria (novel) =

2009 historical crime novel by Lindsey Davis

- Author: Lindsey Davis
- Cover artist: Mark Edwards
- Language: English
- Series: Marcus Didius Falco
- Genre: Historical mystery crime novel
- Publisher: Century, Mysterious Press
- Publication date: 5 February 2009
- Publication place: United Kingdom
- Media type: Print (hardback and paperback)
- Pages: 288
- ISBN: 1-84605-288-2
- OCLC: 267224251
- Preceded by: Saturnalia
- Followed by: Nemesis

Alexandria is a 2009 historical mystery crime novel by Lindsey Davis and the 19th book in her Marcus Didius Falco series. Set in Egypt and Ancient Rome, the novel stars Marcus Didius Falco, informer and imperial agent. The title refers to the setting where the deaths occur.

== Plot summary ==
Falco and his family attend a dinner party in Alexandria, Egypt, hosted by his mother's brother Fulvius and his partner Cassius, to which the Serapaeion Chief Librarian, Theon, is invited. Unfortunately for them, Theon is later found dead, locked in his chamber, and Falco's entire family is suspected of causing Theon's demise.

As usual, Falco has to clear everyone's names. He visits the Serapeion and meets the people running it, including Philetus, its deceptively incompetent Director, and a naturalist, Philadelphion. Falco's family also cross paths with an old family friend, Thalia (from Venus in Copper and Last Act in Palmyra), who has also arrived in Egypt presumably to "discuss business" with Philadelphion, as well as his dreaded father Geminus, who has arrived to discuss business with uncle Fulvius.

More deaths soon follow: an old scholar, Nibytas, is found dead in the Library of Alexandria, while a student, Heras, is devoured by a crocodile in Philadelphion's care, further compounding the difficulty of Falco's investigations. Philadelphion takes matters into his own hands and personally dissects Theon's body in public, risking arrest by the authorities in the process (who have banned operating on dead bodies), but not before revealing some interesting tidbits: Theon was emotionally depressed (his liver was enlarged from heavy drinking), and he was poisoned from ingesting oleander. A deadly chase through the streets of Alexandria ending at the top of the Pharos soon reveals more: the Director was stealing library scrolls for resale back to Rome; the intermediaries being none other than Falco's uncle and father, Fulvius and Geminus. Theon and Nibytas tried to stop Philetus, with tragic consequences for both: Nibytas chose to press on and was murdered, while Theon simply committed suicide by eating the oleander from garlands at the dinner party with Fulvius. Falco sadly admits that he may have caused Theon's death simply by asking Theon about the books under his care while having dinner with Fulvius, causing Theon to decide to take his own life later.

Fearful of being found out, Philetus starts a fire in the library, but Helena and the students manage to douse the blaze; he is eventually forced to relinquish his post as Director. With the cases of Theon and Nibytas now solved, one death remains to be investigated, however: that of Heras. Falco discovers a love triangle between Philadelphion and a lawyer named Nicanor, but both men reconcile and take turns to "share" the woman. Heras' death is revealed to be indeed linked to the Chief Librarian's post — a disgruntled Library worker named Timosthenes hoped to kill Philadelphion by getting his own crocodiles to eat him, but ended up killing Heras instead. Enraged at his failure, Timosthenes attempts to kill Falco but is instead stabbed to death by Katutis, who has been stalking Falco all along to coax a job out of him in Rome — Falco grudgingly allows Katutis to follow his family back to Rome, where he becomes Falco's secretary.

Back in Rome, Falco and Helena receive a letter from Cassius, stating that Philadelphion eventually became the Chief Librarian, despite having vowed to Falco to renounce the position to stay on as a naturalist. Falco laments that despite Philadelphion's brilliance as a biologist, he may not like his new job as his interest is in experimental science, not archival management.

== Major themes ==
- Roman rule and administration in Egypt
- The ethics of human experimentation and anatomical dissection in Hellenistic Egypt
- The domination of Greeks in the intellectual and cultural life of Roman Asia and the Middle East
- Falco's relationship with his father and distant relatives
- The events which unfold and lead into the next novel, Nemesis

== Author's comment ==
Davis has said: "... [I spent some time] researching in the British Library – and since I always enjoy double use of experiences, you may find my observations reflected in scenes in the new book which are set in the legendary Great Library of Alexandria. ... Not that there could ever be academic back-stabbing, murder, arson and fraud at that wonderful building on the Euston Road and I certainly never came across an on-site autopsy of a librarian who would end up mummified!"

== See also ==
- Catoblepas, "not appearing, but deserves a mention" (from list of Principal Characters)
- Musaeum, the Museion of the book
