= Saturnalia (Davis novel) =

2007 historical crime novel by Lindsey Davis

- First edition
- Author: Lindsey Davis
- Cover artist: Mark Edwards
- Language: English
- Series: Marcus Didius Falco
- Genre: Historical mystery crime novel
- Publisher: Century
- Publication date: 2007
- Publication place: United Kingdom
- Media type: Print (Hardback & Paperback)
- Pages: 448
- ISBN: 0-09-951998-4
- Preceded by: See Delphi and Die
- Followed by: Alexandria

Saturnalia is a 2007 historical mystery crime novel by Lindsey Davis and the 18th book of the Marcus Didius Falco Mysteries series. Set in ancient Rome, the novel's central character and narrator is Marcus Didius Falco, informer and imperial agent. The title refers to the Saturnalia feast held annually on 17 December, at which the Romans commemorated the dedication of the temple of the god Saturn. Over the years, it expanded to a whole week, up to 23 December.

This novel makes numerous references to the events in Davis's earlier novel in the Falco series, The Iron Hand of Mars (1992).

== Characters ==
=== Romans ===
- Helena Justina – Wife of Falco, and daughter of the Senator Decimus Camillus Verus
- Marcus Didius Falco – Informer and Imperial Agent.

== Allusions/references to actual history, geography and current science ==
- Set in Rome, during the reign of Emperor Vespasian.
- Titus Caesar, Son of Emperor Vespasian appears
- Plot involves disappearance of Veleda, Germanic priestess and prophetess involved in the Batavian rebellion previous to the events in this book

== Release details ==
- 2007, UK Hardback, ISBN 978-1-84605-034-3, Century, February
- 2007, UK Trade Paperback, Century, July
- 2007, Australian Trade Paperback, Century 1, February
- 2007, New Zealand Trade Paperback, Century, March
- 2007, Canadian Trade Paperback, Century 27, March
- 2007, UK Paperback, Arrow February 2008
- 2007, UK Audio, BBC Audiobooks
- 2007, US Hardback, St Martin's Minotaur, May
- 2007, US Audio, BBC America Audiobooks, May
