= Poseidon's Gold =

1993 novel by Lindsey Davis

- First edition
- Author: Lindsey Davis
- Language: English
- Series: Marcus Didius Falco
- Genre: Historical mystery crime novel
- Publisher: Century
- Publication date: 1993
- Publication place: United Kingdom
- Media type: Print (hardback and paperback)
- Pages: 336 pp
- ISBN: 0-71-265831-9
- OCLC: 227274016
- Preceded by: The Iron Hand of Mars
- Followed by: Last Act in Palmyra

Poseidon's Gold is a 1993 historical mystery crime novel by Lindsey Davis and the fifth instalment of the Marcus Didius Falco Mysteries series. Set in Rome during AD 72, the novel stars Marcus Didius Falco, informer and imperial agent. The gold in the title refers to the treasure, taken by Falco's brother Festus for one of Festus' wild schemes and which now appears to have gone down with the ship, returning to Poseidon.

== Plot summary ==
In Poseidon's Gold, Falco returns from a six-month mission to Germania Libera, only to become embroiled in the after-effects of a scam by his now-deceased, older brother Festus. The story recounts shipping scams, crooked antiques auctions, and hired thugs, all while Falco is trying to clear his family's name and sort out Festus' business dealings.

== Characters ==
=== Main characters ===
- Decimus Camillus Verus – Senatorial father of Helena Justina.
- Helena Justina – Daughter of the Senator Decimus Camillus Verus
- Julia Justa – Wife of Decimus Camillus Verus and mother of Helena
- Junilla Tacita – Mother of Falco
- Lucius Petronius Longus – Investigator for the vigiles and friend of Falco
- Marcus Didius Favonius (aka Geminus) – Auctioneer and Father of Falco
- Marcus Didius Falco – Informer and Imperial Agent from the Aventine.

=== Other characters ===
- Anacrites – Imperial spy
- Apollonius – An ex-geometry teacher
- Cocceius – Auctioneer
- Domitian Caesar – Youngest son of the Emperor
- Epimandos – A waiter
- Lenia – A Laundress
- Manilus – A painter
- Marponius – A trial judge and encyclopaedia salesman
- Orontes Mediolanus – A sculptor
- Rubina – An artist's model
- Varga – A painter

== Major themes ==
- Investigation into the murky business dealings of Marcus Didius Festus and the fight to clear the family name.
- Developing relationship of Marcus Didius Falco and Helena Justina.

== Allusions/references to actual history, geography and current science ==
- Set in Rome in AD 72, during the reign of Emperor Vespasian.

== Allusions/references to other works ==
- The novel ends on a somewhat elaborate joke. The Judean slaves attempt to send Falco on a quest to recover a missing artefact. At first, Falco is afraid that they want him to raid the treasures brought back after the conquest. However, they then tell Falco that they want him to look for a "Lost Ark". Falco demurs, and says someone who is more of a daredevil than he would have to perform that particular quest, alluding to Indiana Jones and the Raiders of the Lost Ark.

== Publication details ==
- 1993, UK, Century Hardback (out of print)
- 1994, UK, Arrow, Paperback ISBN 0-09-983190-2
- 1995, US, Crown/Ballantine ISBN 0-345-38025-8
- 1999, UK, Arrow, Paperback ISBN 0-7126-8018-7 (as part of single-volume omnibus edition, Falco on his Metal, with Venus in Copper and The Iron Hand of Mars)

== Adaptations in other media ==
- BBC Radio 4 starring Anton Lesser and Anna Madeley, in May 2009. Unlike previous Radio 4 dramatisations of novels from the Falco series (in four or six half-hour episodes), this adaptation was broadcast as ten 15-minute episodes as the Woman's Hour Drama. This instalment added Trevor Peacock to the recurring cast, as Geminus.
