= Shadows in Bronze =

1990 novel by Lindsey Davis

- First edition
- Author: Lindsey Davis
- Language: English
- Series: Marcus Didius Falco
- Genre: Crime novel, historical mystery
- Publisher: Century UK
- Publication date: 1990
- Publication place: United Kingdom
- Media type: Print (hardback and paperback)
- Pages: 452 pp (Paperback)
- ISBN: 0-7126-8459-X (Hardback)
- OCLC: 44059065
- Preceded by: The Silver Pigs
- Followed by: Venus in Copper

Shadows in Bronze is a 1990 historical mystery crime novel by Lindsey Davis and the second book of the Marcus Didius Falco Mysteries series. Set in Rome, southern Italy, and the Bay of Neapolis during AD 71, just after the year of the four emperors, the novel stars Marcus Didius Falco, informer and imperial agent. The bronze of the title is a statue of a young Helena Justina, Falco's romantic interest.

== Plot summary ==
The story begins in Rome during late spring, AD 71. Marcus Didius Falco and a group of the Praetorian Guard under the captaincy of Julius Frontinus are disposing of a decomposing corpse. Secrecy is paramount as he was the victim of a discreet execution, having been guilty of treason against the Emperor. In his position as imperial agent, Falco is involved with the tidying of the conspiracy (as related in the previous novel The Silver Pigs) and the emptying of the traitor's house. Falco is assisted by Anacrites and Momus. When Falco and Anacrites arrive at the Palace to report to the Emperor, Falco runs into the Senator Decimus Camillus Verus and his daughter, Helena Justina. He then reports to the Emperor, who wishes to destroy any evidence that his son, Domitian, was involved with the scheme.

When a freedman bursts in to inform the Emperor that the Temple of Hercules Gaditanus is on fire, Anacrites is sent to the Transtiberina to find a freedman named Barnabas who has been following Falco around, whilst Falco is sent to investigate the arson attack. There he discovers that Curtius Longinus, who had been summoned to Rome to account for his role in the plot, has been killed in the fire. He returns to the palace to be informed that Anacrites had been unable to locate Barnabas; the freedman immediately becoming suspect in the arson and death.

Falco is sent to Magna Graecia in southern Italy in search of Aulus Curtius Gordianus, the brother of Curtius Longinus, who may also be in danger from Barnabas. Arriving in Crotone, Falco is caught up in a brawl in the marketplace, but is rescued by Laesus, a ship's captain, with whom Falco then shares a meal at the mansio. Falco tracks down Gordianus at the Temple of Hera at Cape Colonna and informs him of the death of his brother. While Gordianus spends several days in mourning, Falco stays on the beach with a goat previously intended as a sacrifice, before an acolyte at the Temple informs him that Gordianus has returned. Falco suggests that Gordianus accept a better post in Paestum. This would be a generous gift from Vespasian to get the senator back on side with the new regime, but it would also put Gordianus closer to Rome and make it easier for Vespasian to keep him in line in future. Barnabas is once more implicated in an attack on the Deputy Priest, apparently mistaking him for Gordianus who would normally have been conducting the ceremony, but Falco is forced to return to Rome without tracking him down.

At the end of June, Falco travels to the Bay of Neapolis. This time he is travelling in the company of his friend, Petronius, and Petronius' family, as well as his own nephew, Larius. This "holiday" is in fact a cover for Falco trying to track down Aufidius Crispus, a senator who had also been implicated in the plot. His plan is to masquerade as a plumber in the company of his nephew. In that guise they travel around various country estates. One estate they visit is that of Caprenius Marcellus, where they meet Helena Justina, who is visiting her father-in-law.

Due to the amorous nature of their ox, Nero, Falco and Larius are arrested in Herculaneum. They are taken to see the magistrate, Aemilius Rufus. There they again meet Helena, as well as her friend, Rufus' sister. Falco becomes a harp tutor to the sister. Falco tracks down Aufidius Crispus at the Villa Poppaea, where the senator is hosting a banquet to gain support for his political moves. On their return they once again find traces of Barnabas, but the freedman has vanished.

After several days, Falco catches up with him, only to discover that "Barnabas" is Atius Pertinax, the ex-husband of Helena Justina, believed dead. It is made clear that Marcellus expects to remarry his ex-wife. Pertinax and Crispus flee Imperial questioning on Crispus' yacht, but Crispus is killed when the yacht is rammed by a trireme under the authority of Rufus. Pertinax escapes, returning to Rome and attempting to force Helena Justina to remarry him to regain his money. He is tricked and is finally killed by Falco.

== Characters ==
=== Main characters ===
- Marcus Didius Falco – Informer and Imperial Agent from the Aventine.
- Helena Justina – Daughter of the Senator Decimus Camillus Verus, and romantic interest of Falco.
- Lucius Petronius Longus – Member of the Vigiles and friend of Falco.

=== Other characters ===
- Aemilia Fausta – Sister of Rufus Clemens.
- Anacrites – Imperial spy.
- Arria Silvia – Wife of Petronius.
- Aulus Curtius Gordianus – Chief Priest of Hera.
- Bryon – Horse trainer.
- Caprenius Marcellus – ex-Consul and father of Atius Pertinax.
- Chrysosto – A Levantine secretary.
- Decimus Camillus Verus – Senatorial father of Helena Justina.
- Famia – Horse doctor and brother-in-law of Falco.
- Geminus – Auctioneer.
- Gnaeus Atius Pertinax Caprenius Marcellus – Ex-husband of Helena Justina and traitor to the Empire, supposed murdered three months before the start of the story.
- Gornia – Foreman.
- Julia Justa – Mother of Helena Justina.
- Julius Frontinus – Captain of the Praetorian Guard.
- Laesus – Captain of the Sea Scorpion.
- Larius – Fourteen-year-old nephew of Falco.
- Lenia – A Laundress.
- Lucius Aufidius Crispus – Senator from Latium.
- Milo – Steward of Curtius Gordianus.
- Momus – Slave overseer.
- Ollia – Fifteen-year-old neighbour of Silvia.
- Petronilla – Daughter of Petronius.
- Secunda – Friend of Lenia.
- Sextus Aemilius Rufus Clemens – Praetor.
- Silvana – Daughter of Petronius.
- Smaractus – Falco's Landlord.
- Tadia Longina – Two-year-old daughter of Petronius.
- Titus Caesar – Eldest son of the Emperor.
- Tullia – A barmaid in the Transtiberina.
- Ventriculus – Plumber.
- Vespasian Augustus – Emperor of Rome.

=== Death toll ===
- Atius Pertinax – Stabbed but not fatally injured by Aulus Curtius Gordianus, goaded into tripping onto the lodged blade by Falco.
- Aufidius Crispus – Killed when his yacht was rammed by a trireme.
- Curtius Longinus – Killed during fire at Temple of Hercules Gaditanus.

== Major themes ==
- Tidying up after conspiracy of The Silver Pigs (1989)
- Developing relationship of Marcus Didius Falco and Helena Justina

== Allusions/references to actual history, geography and current science ==
- Set in Rome during AD 71 during the reign of Emperor Vespasian.

== Adaptations in other media ==
- BBC World: Radio 4 dramatisation starring Anton Lesser and Anna Madeley

== Release details ==
- September 1990, UK, Century, ISBN 0-7126-8459-X, Hardback
- 1999, UK, Isis Audio, ISBN 0-7531-0687-6 (read by Christopher Scott)
- September 2000, UK, Arrow, ISBN 0-09-941472-4, Paperback
