= Fritha Goodey =

English actress (1972–2004)

- Born: Fritha Jane Goodey; 23 October 1972; Kingston upon Thames, Surrey, England
- Died: 7 September 2004 (aged 31); Notting Hill, London, England
- Education: London Academy of Music and Dramatic Art
- Occupation: Actress

Fritha Jane Goodey (23 October 1972 – 7 September 2004) was a British stage, radio and film actress known for her performance in the film About a Boy (2002), in which she played one of Hugh Grant's character's former girlfriends.

== Early life ==
Goodey was born in Kingston upon Thames, Surrey, and trained at the London Academy of Music and Dramatic Art.

== Career ==
Goodey's stage work, most notably with Max Stafford-Clark's Out of Joint touring company, included Nadia in Some Explicit Polaroids (1999), Odette in Remembrance of Things Past (2000), Constance Neville in She Stoops to Conquer (2002) and Mrs. Garrick in A Laughing Matter. She had recently won a coveted role in a revival staging of Terence Rattigan's Man and Boy.

Her radio works include The Further Adventures of Sherlock Holmes episode The Determined Client and Helena Justina in the serialisation of the Falco novel The Silver Pigs.

== Death ==
Having struggled with anorexia for years, on 7 September 2004 Goodey took her own life in Notting Hill, in the Royal Borough of Kensington and Chelsea, by stabbing herself in the chest. She was 31 years old. Her funeral was at the West London Crematorium, Kensal Green.

== Filmography ==
- Bookcruncher (2002)
- About a Boy (2002)
- She Stoops to Conquer (2003)

=== Television ===
- Dr Willoughby (1999)
- Randall and Hopkirk (1 episode, 2000)
- The Red Phone: Manhunt (2001)
- Table 12 (1 episode, 2001)
- Sherlock (2002)
- The Lost Prince (2003)
- The Red Phone: Checkmate (2003)
- When I'm 64 (2004)
