= A Hidden Life (soundtrack) =

A Hidden Life (Original Motion Picture Soundtrack)

Film score by James Newton Howard
- Released: December 6, 2019
- Recorded: June 2018
- Studios: Abbey Road Studios, London
- Genres: Film score; classical; orchestral
- Length: 69:30
- Label: Sony Classical
- Producer: James Newton Howard

James Newton Howard chronology
Fantastic Beasts: The Crimes of Grindelwald (2018)	A Hidden Life (2019)	Emily in Paris (2020)

A Hidden Life (Original Motion Picture Soundtrack) is the film score composed by James Newton Howard to the 2019 film A Hidden Life, directed by Terrence Malick and starring August Diehl, Valerie Pachner and Matthias Schoenaerts. The film's soundtrack consisted of Howard's score along with selected works from classical composers. The album was released through Sony Classical Records on December 6, 2019.

== Development ==
"What happens with a good score is, somehow the composer manages to cast himself or herself in the role of the protagonist. And then you write from their perspective. These were big ideas, big questions, and those feelings really inspired the score."

— James Newton Howard on the score for A Hidden Life

James Newton Howard had composed the film score for A Better Life. Howard had earlier known Terrence Malick as they previously planned to collaborate on a film nine years ago, which did not materialize. When Malick contacted Howard regarding his involvement in A Better Life, the latter immediately agreed.

Howard said that "Terry has a wonderful sense of music" and the film had classical compositions from all over the place, with the score being one part of it. He considered on being involved earlier in the film, so that he could have replaced some of the other classical music with his original score but felt fortunate that he got at least 30–40 minutes of the score into the film; He compared Malick's working style to be that of Michael Mann who used music from other sources in Collateral (2004), which Howard scored, but also gave room for Howard's music to be included.

Howard considered his score for as "spiritual-sounded" and recalled that Malick discussed with him about the suffering of love owing to the difficult relationship between the farmer and his wife, and the audience would feel the yearning, suffering and love in the titular piece. The theme music featured contribution from violinist James Ehnes, who also performed Howard's violin concerto released in 2018. The score also accompanies the use of piano and a 40-piece string section from the Hollywood Studio Symphony orchestra conducted by Pete Anthony. It was recorded and mixed by Shawn Murphy at the Abbey Road Studios in London, and the session was held for a single day during June 2018.

Though Howard composed around 40 minutes of music for the film, he also submitted music that sans picture for Malick and his editors to use those pieces. The rest of the film accompanies a mix of selected classical works by Johann Sebastian Bach, George Frideric Handel, Antonin Dvořák, Henryk Górecki, Arvo Pärt, Wojciech Kilar amongst others. The pieces were performed by the English Chamber Orchestra, Polish National Radio Symphony Orchestra and Tapiola Sinfonietta.

== Reception ==
Filmtracks wrote: "The highlights of this score are a must-have for any compilation of the composer's lyrical triumphs." Peter Debruge of Variety wrote: "composer James Newton Howard lends ambience and depth between a mix of heavenly choirs and meditative classical pieces". Steve Pond of TheWrap wrote: "James Newton Howard's score is appropriately grand — though as usual for Malick, it's abetted by the extensive use of existing classical music, from Bach and Beethoven and Handel to Henry Gorecki, Arvo Pärt and Alfred Schnittke." Ann Hornaday of The Washington Post described it a "marvelous orchestral score".

Chris Tilly of IGN wrote: "James Newton Howard's score should also be singled out, his lavish choral pieces perfectly complementing that imagery, the film frequently a stunning assault on the senses." Justin Chang of Los Angeles Times called it a "gorgeous" score. Sophie Monks Kaufman of Little White Lies wrote: "James Newton Howard's score is overwhelmingly stirring, as string and piano notes travel high up to heaven then back down to earth, revelling in orchestral music that presents bliss as a state of blithe humility."

Ty Burr of The Boston Globe called it a "piercingly lyrical score". Tim Robey of The Daily Telegraph wrote: "the soundtrack, in between James Newton Howard's stirring cues, cycles between the director's old-favourite checklist of contemporary sacred composers: Henryk Górecki, Arvo Pärt, Wojciech Kilar." Jordan Raup of The Film Stage listed it as one of the best film scores of 2019.

== Track listing ==
All music is composed by Howard, except where noted.

No.	Title	Length
1.	"A Hidden Life"	2:51
2.	"Israel in Egypt, HWV 54, Part I, No. 16 "Chorus: And Believed The Lord"" (George Frederick Handel, Simon Preston conducting the Choir of Christ Church Cathedral, Oxford and English Chamber Orchestra)	4:25
3.	"Surrounded by Walls"	2:53
4.	"Return"	2:41
5.	"Indoctrination"	2:12
6.	"Morality in Darkness"	3:13
7.	"Love and Suffering"	7:44
8.	"Tabula Rasa: II. Silentium" (Arvo Pärt, Jean-Jacques Kantorow conducting the Tapiola Sinfonietta)	15:46
9.	"Hope"	2:30
10.	"Descent"	6:25
11.	"Czech Suite in D Major, Op. 39: I. Allegro Moderato" (Antonín Dvořák, Antoni Wit conducting the Polish National Radio Symphony Orchestra)	3:54
12.	"Kleines Requiem für eine Polka, Op. 66: IV. Adagio Cantabile" (Henryk Górecki, Rudolf Werthen conducting the I Fiamminghi)	6:25
13.	"Knotted"	3:39
14.	"There Will Be No Mysteries"	4:42
Total length:		69:30

== Accolades ==
Award	Date of ceremony	Category	Recipient(s)	Result	Ref(s)
International Film Music Critics Association	February 20, 2020	Best Original Score For A Drama Film	A Hidden Life	Nominated	
International Film Music Critics Association	February 20, 2020	Film Music Composition of the Year	James Newton Howard	Nominated	
