= The Silver Pigs =

1989 novel by Lindsey Davis

- First edition
- Author: Lindsey Davis
- Language: English
- Series: Marcus Didius Falco
- Genre: Historical mystery, crime novel
- Publisher: Sidgwick & Jackson
- Publication date: 1989
- Publication place: United Kingdom
- Media type: Print (hardcover)
- Pages: 258 pp
- ISBN: 0-51-757363-6
- OCLC: 175283712
- Followed by: Shadows in Bronze

The Silver Pigs is a 1989 historical mystery crime novel by English author Lindsey Davis and the first book in the Marcus Didius Falco Mysteries series. Set in Rome and Britannia during AD 70, just after the year of the four emperors, the novel stars Marcus Didius Falco, informer and imperial agent. The book's title refers to 200-pound lead ingot "pigs" filled with silver ore and stolen from Roman Britain, which feature prominently in the plot.

== Plot summary ==
This first novel in the Marcus Didius Falco Mysteries series introduces the main characters as well as establishes relationships that continue and grow throughout the series.

Falco stumbles upon a conspiracy in the trading of silver ingots, which results in the death a young girl, Sosia Camillina. Hired by Sosia's uncle, a senator, to find out who murdered her and by the Roman Emperor Vespasian, to uncover the conspiracy, Falco finds himself on the next boat to Britain.

Once there he meets a lady way out of his class, Helena Justina, the daughter of the Senator who hired him, and Sosia's cousin. At first sight Falco and Helena loathe each other: He hates her class, and she hates his prejudice. Things are made no easier by Sosia's death, especially for Helena. Working under cover as a slave in a silver mine, Falco learns the meaning of hate, pain and abuse. After being rescued by Helena and a friendly centurion, Falco heads back to Rome, as the reluctant charge of the even more reluctant Helena.

After spending so much time together, and many arguments, misunderstandings and denials, Falco and Helena fall in love, subsequently consummating this in a horse stable, in a public garden. Eventually, Falco sorts out the case and only has to bring the culprits to justice. However, there is no justice, as one of the culprits is Domitian, the Emperor's wayward son, and the only other surviving culprit is very close to Helena and her senator father.

After a final, bloody, retribution is carried out in the climax, Falco is offered a promotion to the equestrian rank. As an equestrian Falco would be upper middle class and could marry Helena without bringing her or her family shame, as would with his current meagre earnings. He refuses, seeing the offer as a bribe to keep the conspiracy hushed-up. Realising how he must have insulted Helena, he returns to Vespasian and asks for the chance again. While he is told that his name can be added to the equestrian lists, he is unable to raise the 400,000 sesterces necessary to purchase land of that value, which is the qualification for equestrian status. Dejected, Falco returns to his dilapidated tenement in the Aventine Hill and there finds Helena waiting for him. She promises to wait for him for as long as it takes.

== Characters ==
=== In Regio XIII (The Aventine Sector) ===
- Lenia – A Laundress.
- Lucius Petronius Longus – Member of the Vigiles and friend of Falco.
- Marcia – Daughter of Falco's deceased brother, Festus.
- Marcus Didius Falco – Informer and Imperial Agent from the Aventine.
- Smaractus – Falco's Landlord.

=== In Regio I (The Capena Gate Sector) ===
- Decimus Camillus Verus – Senator, father of Helena Justina.
- Gnaeus Atius Pertinax – Aedile, ex-husband of Helena Justina.
- Helena Justina – Daughter of the Senator Decimus Camillus Verus, aged 23 years. Lover of Falco.
- Julia Justa – Mother of Helena Justina.
- Naissa – Maid of Helena Justina
- Publius Camillus Meto – Younger brother of Camillus Verus, engaged in import/export trade.
- Sosia Camillina – Daughter of Meto, aged 16 years.

=== At the Imperial Palace ===
- Domitian Caesar – Younger son of the Emperor.
- Titus Caesar – Elder son of the Emperor.
- Vespasian Augustus – Emperor of Rome.

=== In other parts of Rome ===
- Astia – Drayman's floosie
- Glaucus – Gymnasium proprietor
- Julius Frontinus – Captain in the Praetorian Guard

=== In Britain ===
- Aelia Camilla – Procurator's wife, younger sister of Camillus Verus and Publius.
- Cornix – Mine foreman.
- Gaius Flavius Hilaris – Imperial procurator
- Rufrius Vitalis – Ex-Centurion of the Second Augustan Legion, living in retirement at Isca Dumnoniorum.
- Simplex – Medical officer to the Second Augustan Legion at Glevum.
- T. Claudius Triferus – Holder of the contract to manage the Imperial silver mine at Vebiodunum.

== Awards and nominations ==
- Winner of the Authors' Club Best First Novel Award in 1989.

== Adaptations in other media ==
- Falco. BBC Radio 4. ISBN 0-563-52569-X. Radio drama, starring Anton Lesser and Fritha Goodey

== Release details ==
- Davis, Lindsey (2000). "Introduction". The Silver Pigs (Hardback (new) ed.). UK: Century. pp. xiii–xviii. (In this new introduction by the author, Davis comments that some corrections have been made and mentions recent research suggesting that the 'pigs' may not have been formed in the way previously thought, but 'it's possible that when Falco describes the process to Petronius, he is wrong.')
- Davis, Lindsey (2000). The Silver Pigs (Paperback (new) ed.). UK: Arrow. ISBN 0-09-941473-2.
- Davis, Lindsey (2006). The Silver Pigs (Paperback (new ) ed.). US: St. Martins Press. ISBN 0-312-35777-X.
- Davis, Lindsey. The Silver Pigs. Narrated by Donal Donnelly (Audio cassette ed.). Recorded Books. OCLC 317850415.
