= Deadly Election =

2015 historical crime novel by Lindsey Davis

- Front cover of UK hardback
- Author: Lindsey Davis
- Series: Flavia Albia (Falco: The New Generation)
- Genre: historical mystery crime novel
- Publisher: Hodder & Stoughton, St Martin's Press
- Publication date: 2015
- Publication place: UK
- Pages: 386
- ISBN: 978-1-444-79422-9
- Preceded by: Enemies at Home
- Followed by: The Graveyard of the Hesperides

Deadly Election is a 2015 historical mystery crime novel by Lindsey Davis and the third book in the Flavia Albia Mysteries (Falco: The New Generation) series. Set in Ancient Rome, the novel stars Flavia Albia, the British-born adopted daughter of Marcus Didius Falco (the hero of the author's 20-volume Marcus Didius Falco Mysteries series, published from 1989 to 2010). Albia, a widow, works as a "delatrix" (a detective or private informer) in ancient Rome, like Falco. In the UK, the book's cover carries the strapline: "A Flavia Alba Novel".

== Connections to the Falco series ==
The fates of two recurring characters from the Falco series (Claudius Laeta and Nothokleptes) are revealed and discussed.

- By the time Albia meets Laeta, he is a dying man and soon passes on.
- Nothokleptes is revealed to have gone senile; his business is now managed by his son.
