= Anna Madeley =

English actress (born 1977)

- Born: 1 October 1977 (age 49); London, England
- Education: Royal Central School of Speech and Drama
- Occupation: Actress
- Years active: 1985–present
- Partner: Geoffrey Streatfeild
- Children: 2

Anna Madeley (born 1 October 1977) is an English actress. She performed for three seasons with the Royal Shakespeare Company and has appeared in three London productions. She has starred in productions on each of the main British television channels and has also worked in radio and film. Madeley has appeared as Kate Kendrick in Deadwater Fell and as Audrey Hall in the remake of All Creatures Great and Small.

== Early life and education ==
Madeley grew up in London, attending North London Collegiate School. Her speech teacher set her up with some auditions, and she began her career as a child actress at age seven. She then trained at the Central School of Speech and Drama.

== Career ==
She performed with the Royal Shakespeare Company in its 2001–2002 and 2003–2004 seasons. She appeared in The Roman Actor opposite Sir Antony Sher. From 2003 to 2005, she was a regular cast member of ITV's The Royal in which she played Nurse Samantha Beaumont.

In 2005, Madeley appeared in three London productions (Laura Wade's Colder Than Here, as well as The Philanthropist and The Cosmonaut's Last Message..., both at the Donmar Warehouse), and rounded off the year starring as both Aaron and Young Alexander Ashbrook in the original Royal National Theatre production of Helen Edmundson's Coram Boy. In 2006, she starred in two BBC TV films – as the title character in The Secret Life of Mrs Beeton, and in the original drama Aftersun – and the high-profile ITV drama The Outsiders. In early 2007 she was a central character in the second episode of “Lewis”, and she also appeared in Channel 4's Consent, which combined a dramatised vignette about an alleged date rape with a "real life" sequence in which lawyers and a jury made up of members of the public participated in a trial. In February 2007, she played Nina in a production of The Seagull as an understudy when the original actress fell ill. Madeley was the only cast member to reprise her role in Grindley's 2009 Broadway production of The Philanthropist.

In 2010, Madeley appeared in The Secret Diaries of Miss Anne Lister, based on a script by Jane English, and starring Maxine Peake as Anne Lister, a 19th-century industrialist who was Britain's "first modern lesbian" and who kept a detailed journal. The film was shown on the opening night at the Frameline Film Festival at the Castro Theatre in San Francisco in June 2010. In January 2013, Madeley starred in Hammer Films' first live theatre play, a new stage adaptation of The Turn of the Screw. In 2016, she played the role of Clarissa Eden in the Netflix series The Crown. In 2018, she played the role of Marie Stahlbaum, the late mother to the protagonist, Clara, and the queen of the magical land Clara discovers in the fantasy/adventure film The Nutcracker and the Four Realms. In 2020, she played Kate Kendrick in Deadwater Fell and was cast as housekeeper Audrey Hall in the remake of All Creatures Great and Small.

== Personal life ==
Madeley's partner is actor Geoffrey Streatfeild; they have two children.

== Acting credits ==
=== Filmography ===
Year	Film	Role	Notes
1985	Claudia	Little Girl	
1990	Back Home	School Girl	TV film
1998	Cold Feet	Emma	TV series (1 episode: "Episode No.1.5")
1999	Dad	Tasmin	TV series (1 episode: "Reprodadtion")
1999	Guest House Paradiso	Saucy Wood Nymph	
2000	A Dinner of Herbs	Florrie Roystan	TV mini-series (2 episodes)
2001	An Unsuitable Job for a Woman	Petra	TV series (1 episode: "Playing God")
2003	The Royal	Nurse Samantha Beaumont	TV series (20 episodes: 2003–2005)
2004	The Rivals	Lydia Languish	Video
2005	Stoned	Stones' Receptionist	
2006	Aftersun	Esther	TV film
2006	The Outsiders	Erica Chapman	TV film
2006	The Secret Life of Mrs. Beeton	Isabella Beeton	TV film
2007	Consent	Rebecca "Becky" Palmer	TV film
2007	Lewis	Anne Sadikov	TV series (1 episode: "Whom the Gods Would Destroy")
2007	Uninvited	Jane	Short film
2007	The Old Curiosity Shop	Betsy Quilp	TV film
2008	Sense and Sensibility	Lucy Steele	TV series (2 episodes)
2008	In Bruges	Denise	
2008	Affinity	Margaret Prior	
2008	Waking the Dead	Anna Vaspovic	TV series (2 episodes: "Pietà" – Parts 1 & 2)
2008	Brideshead Revisited	Celia Ryder	
2008	The Children	Polly	TV mini-series (3 episodes)
2008	Agatha Christie's Marple	Adele Fortescue	TV series, episode: "A Pocket Full of Rye"
2008	Crooked House	Katherine	TV series (2 episodes)
2009	Law & Order: UK	Kayleigh Gaines	TV series (1 episode: "Hidden")
2010	Hustle	Jennifer Hughes	TV series (1 episode: "The Hush Heist")
2010	The Secret Diaries of Miss Anne Lister	Mariana Belcombe	TV film
2011	The Reckoning	Victoria Sturridge	TV mini-series (1 episode: "Episode No.1.1")
2012	A Fantastic Fear of Everything	WPC Taser	
2012	Strawberry Fields	Gillian	
2012	Secret State	Gina Hayes	TV mini-series (4 episodes)
2012	Words Of The Titanic	Violet Jessop	TV documentary
2013	Agatha Christie's Poirot	Barbara Franklin	TV series (1 episode: "Curtain: Poirot’s Last Case")
2013	Silent Witness	Annette Kelly	TV series (2 episodes: "Change" – Parts 1 & 2)
2013	Utopia	Anya	TV series (6 episodes)
2013	Mr Selfridge	Miss Ravillious	TV series (7 episodes)
2015	Code of a Killer	Sue Jeffreys	TV Mini-Series, 3 episodes
2016	The Crown	Clarissa Eden	TV series (1 episode)
2018	Patrick Melrose	Mary Melrose	TV miniseries
2018	Silent Witness	Anna Lawson	TV series (2 episodes: "Moment Of Surrender" – Parts 1 & 2)
2018	The Nutcracker and the Four Realms	Queen Marie Stahlbaum	
2020	Deadwater Fell	Kate Kendrick	TV miniseries
2020	Sitting in Limbo	Amelia Gentleman	TV film
2020-	All Creatures Great and Small	Mrs Hall	TV series
2021	Time	Anne Warren	TV miniseries
2022	Anatomy of a Scandal	Ellie Frisk	TV miniseries (episodes 1 & 2)
2023	Secret Invasion	Pamela Lawton	TV miniseries (2 episodes)
2025	The Chelsea Detective	Siobhan Draper	2 episodes "For The Greater Good"
2026	Vindicta	Eliza Svoboda	
2026	Fatherland	Betty Knox	
TBA	The Age of Innocence	Aunt Medora	TV series

=== Stage ===
- The Merry Wives of Windsor (1986, RSC)
- Be My Baby (1998, Pleasance Theatre)
- Sense & Sensibility (2000, UK tour)
- Eye Contact (2000, Riverside Studios)
- Madness in Valencia(2001, RSC) as Erifila
- Love in a Wood (2001, RSC) as Martha
- A Russian In The Woods (2001, RSC) as Ilse
- The Malcontent (RSC) as Maria
- The Roman Actor(RSC) as Domita
- Ladybird (2004, Royal Court Theatre) as Yulka
- The Rivals (2004, Bristol Old Vic) as Lydia Languish
- Colder Than Here (2005, Soho Theatre) as Jenna
- The Cosmonaut's Last Message to the Woman He Once Loved in the Former Soviet Union(2005, Donmar Warehouse) as Nastasja/Claire
- The Philanthropist (2005, Donmar Warehouse) as Celia
- Coram Boy (2005–06, Royal National Theatre) as Aaron / Young Alexander Ashbrook
- Contractions (2008, Royal Court Theatre) as Emma
- Earthquakes in London (2010, Cottesloe Theatre at the National Theatre) as Freya
- Becky Shaw (2011, Almeida Theatre) as Suzanna
- Private Lives (2011, Music Box Theatre) as Sybil
- The Turn of the Screw (2013, Almeida Theatre) as the Governess
- The Crucible (2014, The Old Vic Theatre) as Elizabeth Proctor
- Les Blancs (2016, National Theatre) as Dr. Marta Gotterling
- The Height of the Storm (2018, Richmond Theatre)
- The Little Foxes (2024, The Young Vic Theatre) as Birdie Hubbard

=== Radio ===
- Shadows in Bronze (2005, radio series) as Helena Justina
- Venus in Copper (2006, radio series) as Helena
- The Iron Hand of Mars (2007, radio series) as Helena
- Poseidon's Gold (2009, radio series) as Helena
- Hammer Horror's The Unquenchable Thirst of Dracula (2017) as Penny Woods
