= Fantastic Beasts: The Crimes of Grindelwald (soundtrack) =

2018 film score by James Newton Howard

Film score by James Newton Howard
- Released: 9 November 2018 (Digital); 30 November 2018 (CD); 25 January 2019 (Vinyl)
- Recorded: 2018
- Studios: Abbey Road Studios (Westminster, London)
- Genre: Soundtrack
- Length: 77:17
- Label: WaterTower Music
- Producers: James Newton Howard; Xander Rodzinski

James Newton Howard chronology
| The Nutcracker and the Four Realms (2018) | Fantastic Beasts: The Crimes of Grindelwald (2018) | A Hidden Life (2019) |

Fantastic Beasts: The Crimes of Grindelwald is the film score to the 2018 film of the same name, composed by James Newton Howard. The soundtrack was released in both digital and physical formats on 9 and 30 November 2018 respectively by WaterTower Music, with a vinyl being released later on 25 January 2019.

== Background ==
James Newton Howard, who previously scored the previous film confirmed in a podcast that he would be returning to score the sequel. Howard said in an interview that he saw a "wonderful musical opportunity" with Fantastic Beasts: The Crimes of Grindelwald due to depth of the film. He further stated that he had a passionate and enthusiastic collaboration with director David Yates who he said focused a lot on the musical aspect of the film.

Howard recorded over 2 hours of music, stating that over 90% of the score was new material and not based on the themes of the previous film. In addition, he wanted the "audience to feel, because it's an emotional piece” highlighting the mix of the adventurous, dark, comedic and enchanting moments in the film. The score was recorded at Abbey Road Studios in London with a 90-piece of the London Symphony Orchestra, conducted by Pete Anthony, together with 40 members from the London Voices choir and the Trinity Boy's choir with orchestrations provided by Howard, Anthony, Jeff Atmajian, Peter Boyer, Jim Honeyman, Philip Klein, Jon Kull and John Ashton Thomas.

== Track listing ==
The last three tracks which appear on the album are piano solos of the individual themes, that Howard performed himself and will not appear in the film. These tracks were released on 26 October 2018. Also not on the soundtrack is "Hedwig's Theme" composed by John Williams which plays when it transitions to Hogwarts.

Original Track Listing
| No. | Title | Writer(s) | Length |
|---|---|---|---|
| 1. | "The Thestral Chase" | Includes Hedwig's Theme by John Williams | 8:04 |
| 2. | "Newt and Leta" | | 2:32 |
| 3. | "Dumbledore" | | 2:11 |
| 4. | "The Kelpie" | | 1:32 |
| 5. | "Newt and Jacob Pack for Paris" | | 2:27 |
| 6. | "Nagini" | | 4:15 |
| 7. | "Newt Tracks Tina" | | 2:27 |
| 8. | "Queenie Searches for Jacob" | | 1:35 |
| 9. | "Irma and the Obscurus" | | 2:56 |
| 10. | "Blood Pact" | | 2:29 |
| 11. | "Capturing the Zouwu" | | 1:33 |
| 12. | "Traveling to Hogwarts" | | 1:06 |
| 13. | "Leta's Flashback" | | 4:40 |
| 14. | "Salamander Eyes" | | 2:28 |
| 15. | "Matagots" | | 2:15 |
| 16. | "Your Story is Our Story" | | 3:21 |
| 17. | "Leta's Confession" | | 5:14 |
| 18. | "Vision of War" | | 3:49 |
| 19. | "Spread the Word" | | 4:01 |
| 20. | "Wands into the Earth" | | 4:04 |
| 21. | "Restoring Your Name" | | 6:20 |
| 22. | "Fantastic Beasts: The Crimes of Grindelwald" | | 2:40 |
| 23. | "Dumbledore's Theme (Piano Solo)" | | 1:27 |
| 24. | "Fantastic Beasts Theme (Piano Solo)" | | 1:37 |
| 25. | "Leta's Theme (Piano Solo)" | | 2:04 |
| Total length: | | | 77:17 |

== Personnel ==
- James Newton Howard — composer, orchestrator, liner notes, soundtrack producer
- Pete Anthony — conductor, orchestrator
- Jeff Atmajian — orchestrator
- Jon Kull — orchestrator
- Philip Klein — orchestrator
- John Ashton Thomas — orchestrator
- Peter Boyer — orchestrator
- Shawn Murphy — recording engineer
- Peter Cobbin — score mixer
- Kirsty Whalley — score mixer
- John Barrett — protools operator
- Xander Rodzinski — soundtrack producer, technical scoring engineer
- Tyler Durham — technical scoring engineer
- Chris Cozen — technical scoring engineer
- Cecile Tournesac — score editor
- Pamela Sollie — score coordinator
- Thomas Bowes — orchestra leader
- London Voices — choir, chorus
- Trinity Boys' Choir — choir, chorus
- Mark Graham — music preparation
- John Williams – original composer of Hedwig's Theme
- David Yates – executive producer, liner notes

== Charts ==
| Chart (2018) | Peak position |
|---|---|
| Belgian Albums (Ultratop Flanders) | 198 |
| Belgian Albums (Ultratop Wallonia) | 194 |
