= Dr Willoughby =

1999 British television series

- Genre: Sitcom
- Created by: Laurie Rowley
- Written by: Laurie Rowley
- Directed by: David Skinner
- Starring: Joanna Lumley; Brian Protheroe; Isobel Middleton; Paula Bacon; Ian Puleston-Davies; Gillian Barge; Tanya Moodie; Ursula Holden-Gill; Scott Hickman; Michelle Joseph; Fritha Goodey
- Country of origin: United Kingdom
- Original language: English
- No. of seasons: 1
- No. of episodes: 6

Production
- Producer: Tony Charles
- Running time: 27 minutes
- Production company: WitzEnd Productions

Original release
- Network: ITV
- Release: 14 November – 13 December 1999

Dr Willoughby is a British sitcom broadcast on ITV from 14 November – 13 December 1999.

The show was set on the set of a fictional soap opera, also called Dr Willoughby and followed the often over dramatic storylines and the personal lives of the cast and crew.

Joanna Lumley plays Donna Sinclair, who plays the fictional part of Dr Willoughby. Donna is less than popular with her co-stars and her producer and gets less fanmail than anyone else, including new cast member Crystal and long standing co-star Ralph Whatman.

Ralph Whatman is the male lead in Dr Willoughby and whenever Donna Sinclair has bad publicity or is heading for a fall he wastes no time in trying to make the show his own.

Emma Goodliffe is the shows producer, unable to cope with the stress she is begging to be removed from the show. She is even heard in one episode to be applying for a job in a supermarket only to be told she is over qualified.

Crystal is the new girl, she is receiving more fan mail than Donna after just two weeks on the show, something which Donna cannot stand. She demands that producer Emma remove her from the show but her request is rejected leading to Donna to advise Crystal not to wear a bra in order to put off her male fans.

Andy is the shows runner, he is at the beck and call of Donna. When Donna takes a shine to a new actor, she is furious when she walks into a store cupboard only to find that Andy is in there with him.

Dr Willoughby was originally broadcast in 1999 on ITV in the UK, it lasted for just one series of 6 episodes. It was produced by WitzEnd Productions.

It was written and created by Laurie Rowley, produced by Tony Charles and directed by David Skinner.

== Cast ==
Several episodes are available on YouTube and the following cast credits are taken from this.

- Joanna Lumley – Donna Sinclair
- Brian Protheroe – Ralph Whatman
- Isobel Middleton – Emma Goodliffe
- Paula Bacon – Crystal Reynolds
- Ian Puleston-Davies – Steve Lipton
- Gillian Barge – Mrs Ajax
- Tanya Moodie – Geraldine
- Ursula Holden-Gill – Gill
- Scott Hickman – Andy
- Michelle Joseph – Kelly
- Fritha Goodey – Moira Gatewood

== Episodes ==
All episodes were broadcast at 22:00 on ITV every Monday apart from the first episode which aired on a Sunday.

- 1. Fan Mail (14 November 1999)
- 2. Young Pretender (15 November 1999)
- 3. Family Wedding (22 November 1999)
- 4. Speculation (29 November 1999)
- 5. Scandal (6 December 1999)
- 6. Awards (13 December 1999)

== DVD release ==
The series is available on DVD in both the UK and USA.
