= The Ides of April =

2013 mystery novel by Lindsey Davis

- Front cover of UK hardback
- Author: Lindsey Davis
- Series: Flavia Albia (Falco: The New Generation)
- Genre: historical mystery, crime novel
- Publisher: Hodder & Stoughton
- Publication date: 11 April 2013
- Publication place: UK
- Pages: 356
- ISBN: 978-1-4447-5581-7
- Followed by: Enemies at Home

The Ides of April is a 2013 historical mystery crime novel by Lindsey Davis and the first book in the Flavia Albia Mysteries (Falco: The New Generation). Set in March and April AD 89, in the Aventine Hill area of Ancient Rome, the novel stars Flavia Albia, the British-born adopted daughter of Marcus Didius Falco (the hero of the author's 20-volume Marcus Didius Falco Mysteries series, published from 1989 to 2010). Albia, a widow, works as a "delatrix" (detective or private informer) in ancient Rome, like Falco. The book's front cover image depicts a small glass pot and a needle dipped in blood. It carries the strapline, "Falco: The New Generation".

== Connections to the Falco series ==
Falco and his partner Helena are included in the "Cast list" in the book, and Flavia Albia describes them and their household and visits them during the course of the story, but they do not appear directly in the text. Helena's two brothers are mentioned as being lawyers. Falco's old friend Petro is not mentioned in the cast list, but is referred to as Flavia Albia's "uncle" in the text.

Falco's young brother Postumus, the result of Thalia's pregnancy in Nemesis, is now an awkward 11-year-old, who appears in the book.

Flavia Albia uses Falco's old apartment in Fountain Court as her office, and lives elsewhere in the same building. In Enemies at Home, it is revealed that the Didii bought over the Fountain Court block, possibly from Smaractus, Falco's former landlord.

== Reception ==
The Irish Times reviewer wrote: "Irreverent, resourceful and hard-boiled in her patter, Flavia is a heroine to rival her contemporary counterparts VI Warshawski and Kinsey Milhone." Tom Holland reviewed the book for The Guardian and ended:

"If you want to see the worst manners, filthiest motives and saddest ethics," [Albia] says of her own line of work, "this is the profession." Thankfully, though – and as ever with a Davis novel – the narration of these horrors is done so delightfully that the final impression is curiously warm and uplifting.

— Tom Holland, The Guardian

Debra Craine, writing in The Times, included The Ides of April in her list of ten "best crime novels by women since 2000".
