= Red Sparrow (soundtrack) =

Red Sparrow (Original Motion Picture Soundtrack)

Film score by James Newton Howard
- Released: March 2, 2018
- Recorded: October 2017
- Studio: AIR Studios, London
- Genre: Film score
- Length: 76:48
- Label: Sony Classical
- Producer: James Newton Howard

James Newton Howard chronology
Roman J. Israel, Esq. (2017)	Red Sparrow (2018)	The Nutcracker and the Four Realms (2018)

Red Sparrow (Original Motion Picture Soundtrack) is the film score to the 2018 film Red Sparrow directed by Francis Lawrence, starring Jennifer Lawrence (no relation). The film score was composed by James Newton Howard and recorded for six days in October 2017 at the AIR Studios, London, with the London Symphony Orchestra and London Voices performing the orchestra and choir. The score was released under the Sony Classical Records on March 2, 2018.

== Development ==
James Newton Howard composed the film score, reuniting with Lawrence after I Am Legend (2007), Water for Elephants (2011) and The Hunger Games film series. Howard cited Wolfgang Amadeus Mozart's Requiem and Igor Stravinsky's The Firebird as influences for the score and had listened to those pieces in headphones while filming. Due to the limited time in production, he wrote the score even before watching the final edit. The opening sequence where Nate in action on the streets of Moscow and Dominika dancing onstage in ballet, had Howard composed a 12-minute overture which was "distinctly Russian sounding". Francis initially used The Firebird while filming the choreography and set a predetermined rhythm and it could be overlaid to Howard's version, which he called as his Russian interpretation of his own style. Francis was very specific with the rhythm and beats per minute, with the choreography stuck closely to the BPM and editor Alan Edward Bell provided a click track to it, after which they created that sequence to it.

While editing one of the torture scenes in the film, he tried to create the tension without music or sound effects as the eventual sonic tone was sparse, while the music built a cacophonic climax alongside the action. Francis added "The sound of the whole movie, which was a big discussion, informs some of the other choices [...] When you get to a scene like the one in the kitchen there's a palate of sounds and themes to pull from. You can start to decide whether you create something new or hint at other sorts of themes or call back on something." Another pivotal scene involving Dominika in Sparrow school humiliating another cadet, was underlaid by silence to become "very bare and raw". Eventually, Lawrence and Howard wanted the score to be barely noticeable blending with other elements of the film, and surprise the audience to the events happening on screen.

The score was recorded at the AIR Studios in London for six days during October 2017. The recording involved an 100-member orchestra from the London Symphony Orchestra and a 40-member choir from London Voices performing.

== Track listing ==
No.	Title	Length
1.	"Overture"	11:34
2.	"The Steam Room"	2:19
3.	"One Night is All I Ask"	1:29
4.	"Take Off Your Dress"	6:20
5.	"Arriving at Sparrow School"	2:50
6.	"Training"	1:42
7.	"Anya, Come Here"	2:44
8.	"When Did You First Notice the Tail?"	1:04
9.	"There's a Car Waiting To Take You To Moscow"	1:49
10.	"Follow the Trail Wherever It Leads You"	2:29
11.	"Blonde Suits You"	4:59
12.	"Searching Marta's Room"	2:22
13.	"Ticket to Vienna"	1:45
14.	"Telephone Code"	1:10
15.	"Searching Nate's Apartment"	1:04
16.	"Can I Trust You?"	3:06
17.	"Switching Disks"	5:59
18.	"So What Next?"	3:45
19.	"Didn't I Do Well?"	8:48
20.	"End Titles"	9:30
Total length:		76:48

== Reception ==
Jonathan Broxton of Movie Music UK highly praised the soundtrack, saying: "Red Sparrow will be one of those scores where everyone praises the beginning and the end, and sort of ignores everything that happens in between [...] However, if you find yourself not connecting with the middle, it's still perfectly acceptable to revel in the 30 minutes of rich, classical, overwhelmingly powerful orchestral writing that Howard engages in at the beginning and end of the score, because it truly is amongst the finest music of his long and distinguished career." Filmtracks wrote: "this score is promising in the whole and magnificent at its height, but the presentation of its ranks on album, especially sans any of the classical pieces, underachieves to the same extent as the film." Kaya Savas of Film.Music.Media wrote: "Red Sparrow may not have much of an emotional hook, but it's still a very captivating and engrossing score from James Newton Howard." Michel Groothedde of Soundtrack World wrote: "If you were to make a playlist of the "Ouverture," "Didn't I Do Well" and "End Titles," you would get a fantastic suite of classical music of about thirty minutes. Whether that makes buying the CD worthwhile is up to you." James Southall of Movie Wave wrote: "Red Sparrow is a rather uneven score (or album, at least) [...] Howard seems to do consistently good work for Francis Lawrence's films so it will be interesting to hear whatever comes next."

A critic from Film Music Central said, "Howard's score for Red Sparrow is a gorgeous listening experience". Sean Wilson of MFiles wrote: "As a stand-alone listening experience most of the drama is in the first and final two tracks. While these last a full 29 minutes combined, the middle section of the album largely consists of suspense music. However there is enough textural variation and sonically surprising moments scattered throughout to maintain interest until the climax in the final two tracks. James Newton Howard has created something that's different and very welcome." Caleb Burnett of Set the Tape wrote: "James Newton Howard is one among only a few working composers who could've written such a fitting score for Red Sparrow. He does an exemplary job of implementing the elements essential to an international spy film, specifically one involving Russia. Red Sparrow's themes of nationalism, patriotism, heroism, and virtue might not have been as digestible or effectual without the nationalistic and reflective aesthetic created by Howard." Michael Hollands of Sound at the Movies wrote: "James Newton Howard once again proved he is an artist of the highest caliber."

Eric Kohn of IndieWire wrote: "James Newton Howard's ominous score adheres to a familiar set of beats, but it's the rare big Hollywood mood piece and mostly satisfying on those terms." Robbie Collin of The Daily Telegraph called it as a "prowling, Bernard Herrmann-esque score", while Chris Bumbray of JoBlo.com reviewed it as a "really solid score". Ryan Pollard of Starburst wrote: "Composer James Newton Howard delivers a suspenseful score".

== Personnel ==
Credits adapted from liner notes:

- Music composed and produced by – James Newton Howard
- Co-producer – Jim Weidman
- Digital recordist – Adam Miller
- Recording and mixing – Shawn Murphy
- Score editor – David Channing, Erik Swanson
- Music editor – David Olson, Jim Weidman
- Auricle control systems – Chris Cozens, Richard Grant
- Technical score advisor – Victor Chaga, Xander Rodzinski
- Music coordinator – Pamela Sollie
- Music preparation – JoAnn Kane Music Service, Mark Graham
- Scoring crew – Alex Ferguson, John Prestage
- Design – WLP Ltd.

Orchestra

- Orchestra – London Symphony Orchestra
- Orchestration – Jeff Atmajian, Jon Kull, Pete Anthony, Peter Boyer, Philip Klein
- Orchestra leader – Thomas Bowes
- Orchestra conductor – Pete Anthony, Esa-Pekka Salonen
- Orchestra contractor – Isobel Griffiths, Susie Gillis
- Baroque cello – Sarah McMahon
- Bass – Chris Laurence, Richard Pryce, Roger Linley, Stacey Watton, Steve Williams, Steve Mair
- Bassoon and contrabassoon – Gavin McNaughton, Richard Skinner
- Cello – Bozidar Vukotic, Caroline Dearnley, Chris Worsey, Frank Schaefer, Ian Burdge, Martin Loveday, Nick Cooper, Paul Kegg, Tim Gill, Tony Lewis, Vicky Matthews
- Clarinet and bass Clarinet – David Fuest, Nick Rodwell
- Fiddle – Peter Hanson, Sonia Slany
- Flute – Anna Noakes, Karen Jones
- Harp – Skaila Kanga
- Horns – Corinne Bailey, John Thurgood, Mike Thompson, Nicholas Korth, Pip Eastop, Richard Berry, Richard Watkins
- Oboe and cor anglais – Jane Marshall, John Anderson
- Piano – David Hartley
- Timpani – Frank Ricotti, Paul Clarvis, Bill Lockhart
- Trombone – Andy Wood, Dave Stewart, Ed Tarrant, Richard Edwards
- Trumpet – Alistair Mackie, Catherine Knight, Kate Moore, Philip Cobb
- Tuba – Owen Slade, Peter Smith
- Viola – Andy Parker, Bruce White, Fiona Winning, Helen Kamminga, Jake Walker, Julia Knight, Kate Musker, Lydia Lowndes-Northcott, Martin Humbey, Max Baillie, Peter Lale, Rachel Bolt, Rebecca Carrington, Reiad Chibah, Sue Dench, Vicci Wardman
- Viola da Gamba – Nick Cooper
- Violin – Boguslaw Kostecki, Cathy Thompson, Chris Tombling, Clio Gould, Corinne Chapelle, Debbie Preece, Debbie Widdup, Dorina Markoff, Emlyn Singleton, Everton Nelson, Ian Humphries, Jackie Hartley, John Bradbury, John Mills, Jonathan Evans-Jones, Jonathan Strange, Julian Leaper, Julian Tear, Kathy Gowers, Maciej Rakowski, Mark Berrow, Natalia Bonner, Patrick Kiernan, Perry Montague-Mason, Peter Hanson, Roger Garland, Sonia Slany, Steve Morris, Thomas Bowes, Warren Zielinski

Choir

- Choir – London Voices
- Choir conductor – Pete Anthony
- Choirmasters – Ben Parry, Terry Edwards
- Alto vocals – Alex Gibson, Amy Lyddon, Catherine Backhouse, Clara Sanabras, Deryn Edwards, Eleanor Minney, Jo Marshall, Judy Rees, Lucy Potterton, Martha McLorinan
- Bass vocals – Ben Bevan, Edward Grint, Jimmy Holliday, John Evanson, Mark Williams, Michael Dore, Neil Bellingham, Nicholas Ashby, Nicholas Garrett, Nigel Short
- Soprano vocals – Amy Wood, Ann De Renais, Grace Davidson, Joanna L'Estrange, Joanna Goldsmith, Katie Thomas, Katy Hill, Laura Oldfield, Sara Brimer, Sarah Eyden
- Tenor vocals – Andrew Busher, Benedict Hymas, Garth Bardsley, Gerald O'Beirne, Julian Alexander Smith, Matthew Long, Oliver Griffiths, Peter Davoren, Richard Edgar-Williams, Richard Eteson

Management

- Business affairs for Twentieth Century Fox – Tom Cavanaugh
- Music clearance for Twentieth Century Fox – Ellen Ginsburg
- Executive in charge of music for Twentieth Century Fox – Danielle Diego
- Music acquisitions – Mark Cavell
- Soundtrack coordination for Twentieth Century Fox – JoAnn Orgel
- Product manager – Jennifer Liebeskind
- Music supervision for Twentieth Century Fox – Patrick Houlihan
- Music production supervision for Twentieth Century Fox – Rebecca Morellato

== Accolades ==
Award	Category	Recipient	Result	Ref.
International Film Music Critics Association	Best Original Score for an Action/Adventure/Thriller Film	James Newton Howard	Won	
International Film Music Critics Association	Film Music Composition of the Year	James Newton Howard – ("Overture")	Nominated	
