= The Nutcracker and the Four Realms =

- Theatrical release poster
- Directed by: Lasse Hallström; Joe Johnston
- Written by: Ashleigh Powell
- Based on: "The Nutcracker and the Mouse King" by E. T. A. Hoffmann; The Nutcracker by Marius Petipa
- Produced by: Mark Gordon; Larry Franco
- Starring: Keira Knightley; Mackenzie Foy; Eugenio Derbez; Matthew Macfadyen; Richard E. Grant; Misty Copeland; Helen Mirren; Morgan Freeman
- Cinematography: Linus Sandgren
- Edited by: Stuart Levy
- Music by: James Newton Howard
- Production companies: Walt Disney Pictures; The Mark Gordon Company
- Distributed by: Walt Disney Studios Motion Pictures
- Release dates: October 29, 2018 (Dolby Theatre); November 2, 2018 (United States)
- Running time: 99 minutes
- Country: United States
- Language: English
- Budget: $120–133 million
- Box office: $174 million

The Nutcracker and the Four Realms is a 2018 American Christmas fantasy film directed by Lasse Hallström and Joe Johnston, and written by Ashleigh Powell. It is a retelling of both the 1816 literary fairy tale The Nutcracker and the Mouse King and the 1892 ballet The Nutcracker, about a young girl who is gifted a locked egg from her deceased mother and sets out in a magical land to retrieve the key. The film stars Keira Knightley, Mackenzie Foy, Eugenio Derbez, Matthew Macfadyen, Richard E. Grant, Misty Copeland, Helen Mirren, and Morgan Freeman.

The film was announced in March 2016 with Hallström directing from a script by Powell. Much of the cast signed on that summer, and filming began in October at Pinewood Studios, lasting through January 2017. In December 2017, it was announced Johnston would direct a month of reshoots, with Hallström agreeing to Johnston receiving co-directing credit. The reshoots were written by Tom McCarthy, who went uncredited, and Powell received a sole credit as screenwriter. Composer James Newton Howard scored the film, adapting elements from Tchaikovsky's music for the 1892 ballet, while Gustavo Dudamel served as conductor, leading the London Philharmonia Orchestra.

The Nutcracker and the Four Realms premiered at the Dolby Theatre in Los Angeles on October 29, 2018, and was released by Walt Disney Studios Motion Pictures in the United States on November 2. The film was a box office disappointment, grossing $174 million worldwide against a production budget between $120–133 million and losing Disney over $65 million. It received generally mixed to negative reviews, with criticisms of its story and Knightley's performance, although the film's visual effects and aesthetics were praised.

== Plot ==
On Christmas Eve in Victorian London, Benjamin Stahlbaum gives his children Louise, Clara, and Fritz the presents his wife Marie had set aside for them before she died. Clara receives an egg-shaped box that she cannot unlock, together with a note saying "Everything you need is inside". The family goes to a Christmas Eve party, hosted by the children's godfather, skilled engineer Drosselmeyer. Clara asks Drosselmeyer how to unlock her egg. He reveals that he made the egg for Marie when she was younger. Benjamin confronts Clara for refusing to dance with him, and they insult each other.

Drosselmeyer announces the time for presents has come, and the children head into a garden maze to find strings with their names attached to them. Clara finds the string with her name on it, signifying her gift, and follows it into a forest in a parallel world where she spots a key. Before she can grab it, a mouse snatches it and crosses a frozen river. Captain Philip Hoffman, the Nutcracker, leads Clara across the bridge into the Fourth Realm, where they barely escape the mouse king and Mother Ginger, the regent of the Fourth Realm. Captain Philip brings Clara to the palace, where she meets the regents of each land: the Sugar Plum Fairy of the Land of Sweets; Shiver of the Land of Snowflakes, and Hawthorne of the Land of Flowers. They tell Clara they are at war with the Land of Amusements, which they refer to as "the Fourth Realm". It is also revealed that Marie was the beloved Queen of this magical land and, thus, Clara is the princess.

The Sugar Plum Fairy explains that Marie created this world as a young girl and that she animated everyone with a machine that can turn toys into real people. Sugar Plum says this machine can be used to defend the three realms against Mother Ginger, but it needs a key matching the one for Clara's egg. Sneaking into the Fourth Realm, Clara and Philip steal back the key from Mother Ginger (ignoring her warning that Sugar Plum is lying to them), but Clara is disappointed to discover that the egg is only a music box.

Sugar Plum uses the machine to bring toy soldiers to life and orders them to attack the Fourth Realm. She then reveals that she lied about Mother Ginger, who had resisted Sugar Plum's plan to take over all four realms in revenge for her perceived abandonment by Marie, and that the machine can turn this world's people back into toys as well. She imprisons Clara, Captain Philip, and the male regents, causing Clara to blame herself.

Clara opens her egg-shaped music box again and discovers a mirror, illustrating that all she needed was herself. She and the other prisoners escape. One of Mother Ginger's mice shows Clara the engine room, and Captain Philip convinces Mother Ginger to help overthrow Sugar Plum. Clara shuts down the machine while fighting off soldiers with Mother Ginger's aid. Sugar Plum attempts to turn Mother Ginger back into a toy, but Clara tinkers with the engine so it aims back at Sugar Plum when activated, turning her back into a porcelain doll and rendering her entire army lifeless.

Thanked for restoring peace among the Realms and the defeat of Sugar Plum, Clara promises to visit in the future. After saying goodbye to Captain Philip, she returns to London, where time has hardly passed since she left. She and Benjamin apologize to each other and she finally decides to dance with him. He accepts, and Clara opens her music box. Benjamin reveals that the music was the first song that he and Marie had ever danced to. They dance throughout the night in the ballroom.

== Cast ==
The cast includes:

- Mackenzie Foy as Clara Stahlbaum, a young girl who travels into the Four Realms, searching for a key of a gift from her late mother Marie.
- Keira Knightley as the Sugar Plum Fairy, the regent of the Land of Sweets.
- Jayden Fowora-Knight as Captain Philip Hoffman, a nutcracker who helps Clara on her journey.
- Helen Mirren as Mother Ginger, regent of the Land of Amusements (also known as The Fourth Realm).
- Morgan Freeman as Drosselmeyer, Clara's godfather, a skilled engineer, who gives her a magical gift that once belonged to her mother.
- Eugenio Derbez as Hawthorne, regent of the Land of Flowers.
- Richard E. Grant as Shiver, regent of the Land of Snowflakes.
- Misty Copeland as the Ballerina Princess, a gifted dancer in the mysterious Four Realms.
- Matthew Macfadyen as Benjamin Stahlbaum, Clara's father and a widower following the death of his wife Marie.
- Anna Madeley as Queen Marie Stahlbaum, Clara's late mother who created and ruled over the Four Realms as a child.
- Sergei Polunin as the Sweets Cavalier, a dancer who performs alongside the Ballerina Princess.
- Ellie Bamber as Louise Stahlbaum, Clara's older sister.
- Tom Sweet as Fritz Stahlbaum, Clara's younger brother.
- Jack Whitehall as Harlequin, a guard at The Palace of the Four Realms.
- Omid Djalili as Cavalier, another guard at The Palace of the Four Realms and Harlequin's cohort.
- Meera Syal as the Stahlbaum's Cook, a staff member in the Stahlbaum household.
- Charles "Lil Buck" Riley as the Mouse King, ruler of the legion of mice. Riley also provided the choreography and motion-capture performance for the character.
- Prince (the horse) as Jingles the Horse
- Gustavo Dudamel as Conductor
- Max Westwell as Flower Cavalier
- Aaron Smyth as Snow Cavalier

== Production ==
=== Development ===
On March 4, 2016, the project was first announced, which stated that Walt Disney Pictures was developing The Nutcracker and the Four Realms, with Lasse Hallström set to direct, continuing its model of developing classic fairy tales. The project is based on The Nutcracker and the Mouse King by E. T. A. Hoffmann, with Ashleigh Powell on board to write the script. The Mark Gordon Company is also on board as a co-production company with Mark Gordon producing with Lindy Goldstein executive producing for the company.

=== Casting ===
In July 2016, Mackenzie Foy, Misty Copeland, and Morgan Freeman joined the cast. In August 2016, Keira Knightley and Helen Mirren joined the cast. In September 2016, Ellie Bamber joined the cast. In October 2016, Miranda Hart joined the cast, however, her character was later removed from the film. In March 2017, Eugenio Derbez confirmed that he had been cast in the film. Later Jack Whitehall joined the cast.

=== Filming ===
Filming began in October 2016 in South Kensington and Pinewood Studios in England and wrapped in late January 2017. In December 2017, it was reported that Joe Johnston would direct 32 days of reshoots, written by Tom McCarthy, due to Hallström being unavailable. Hallström would still oversee post-production. It was later revealed that Hallström and Johnston had voluntarily decided to receive joint directorial credit for the film.

=== Music ===
The music was adapted in part from Tchaikovsky's The Nutcracker from 1892 by James Newton Howard, altering the original and adding new tracks as well. For the recording, Gustavo Dudamel conducted the London Philharmonia Orchestra, while Lang Lang was the piano soloist. Andrea Bocelli and his son Matteo contributed the original duet "Fall on Me" for the film, which premiered on Dancing with the Stars' "Disney Night" on October 22, 2018. The film's soundtrack album was released on October 26, 2018, by Walt Disney Records.

== Release ==
The Nutcracker and the Four Realms was released on November 2, 2018, by Walt Disney Studios Motion Pictures, replacing the original date set for Disney's live-action adaptation of Mulan.

=== Box office ===
The Nutcracker and the Four Realms grossed $54.9 million in the United States and Canada, and $119.1 million in other territories, for a total worldwide gross of $174 million. Deadline Hollywood calculated the film lost the studio $75–90 million when factoring together all expenses and revenues. The film's status as a box office flop was attributed by TheWrap to a poor release date only two days after Halloween, a bloated budget and a lack of interest on the behalf of audiences in the Nutcracker concept.

In the United States and Canada, The Nutcracker and the Four Realms was released alongside Nobody's Fool and Bohemian Rhapsody, and was projected to gross $20–24 million from 3,766 theaters in its opening weekend. It made $5.89 million on its first day, including $625,000 from Thursday night previews, the lowest figure for a Disney film released in over 2,000 theaters since The Finest Hours in January 2016. It went on to debut at $20.35 million, finishing second behind Bohemian Rhapsody. It was the third big-budgeted film to post a disappointing opening for Disney in 2018 after A Wrinkle in Time and Solo: A Star Wars Story, although Deadline Hollywood, who blamed the early-November release date and poor reviews, noted Disney's Marvel and Pixar films from 2018 would offset any possible losses the film would suffer. The film fell 53% in its second week to $9.5 million, finishing fourth.

The film was released in 45 other countries alongside the US, grossing $39.2 million. As of December 23, 2018, Its top markets were China ($16.2 million), Italy ($11.1 million), Germany ($9.4 million), and the United Kingdom ($7.1 million).

=== Home media ===
The Nutcracker and the Four Realms was released on DVD, Blu-ray, and 4K UHD on January 29, 2019 by Walt Disney Studios Home Entertainment. Blu-ray extras include featurettes, five deleted scenes, and music videos for "Fall on Me" by Andrea Bocelli featuring his son Matteo Bocelli, and Tchaikovsky's The Nutcracker Suite performed by Lang Lang.

== Reception ==
=== Critical response ===
On Rotten Tomatoes, the film has an approval rating of 32% based on 203 reviews with an average rating of 5.1/10. The website's critical consensus reads: "Lacking a transporting yuletide story or dazzling dance routines, The Nutcracker and the Four Realms is a hollow holiday confection that's lovely to look at – and easy to forget." On Metacritic, the film has a weighted average score of 39 out of 100, based on 38 critics, indicating "generally unfavorable reviews". Audiences polled by CinemaScore gave the film an average grade of "B+" on an A+ to F scale. PostTrak reported filmgoers gave it 49% "definite recommend".

David Ehrlich of IndieWire gave the film a grade of "D+", calling the film "empty but eye-popping." He went on to write, "Watching a visually spectacular but virtually soulless new family movie like The Nutcracker and the Four Realms, it's tempting to wonder if such eye-popping dreck has any hope of sticking with impressionable young audiences. Is there any chance that the kids of today might be nostalgic for this hyper-saturated nonsense tomorrow?" Alonso Duralde of TheWrap also gave the film a negative review, writing "The 'child travels to a magical land and learns things' trope has been the basis of many beloved stories, from The Wizard of Oz to The Phantom Tollbooth to The Chronicles of Narnia. But it's not a foolproof device, particularly when the magical land in question never makes much narrative sense; besides, how can the Four Realms be magical when the London where Clara already lives is so obviously a cartoon? Both the 'real' world and the fake one are ugly, overdone, and lacking any visual connection to gravity let alone reality."

=== Accolades ===
Accolades received by The Nutcracker and the Four Realms
Award	Date of ceremony	Category	Recipients	Result	Ref.
Golden Trailer Awards	May 29, 2018	Best Animation/Family	The Nutcracker and the Four Realms	Nominated	
Golden Trailer Awards	May 29, 2018	Best Title/Credit Sequence for a Feature Length Film (or Video Game)	The Nutcracker and the Four Realms	Nominated	
Hollywood Music in Media Awards	November 14, 2018	Original Song — Sci-Fi/Fantasy/Horror Film	"Fall on Me" — Andrea Bocelli & Matteo Bocelli (Written by Ian Axel, Chad Vaccarino, Matteo Bocelli, and Fortunato Zampaglione)	Nominated	
Annie Awards	February 2, 2019	Outstanding Achievement for Character Animation in a Live Action Production	Richard Oey, Adrien Annesley, Allison Orr, Wei Liang Yap, Shan Hao	Nominated	
Costume Designers Guild Awards	February 19, 2019	Excellence in Sci-Fi/Fantasy Film	Jenny Beavan	Nominated	
Teen Choice Awards	August 11, 2019	Choice Sci-Fi/Fantasy Movie Actress	Keira Knightley	Nominated	
Hollywood Professional Association Awards	November 21, 2019	Outstanding Color Grading - Feature Film	Tom Poole	Nominated	

The film was one of 20 out of 2018's top-100 grossing movies in the US to be recognized with the ReFrame Stamp for hiring women in at least four of eight key production categories.

== See also ==
- List of Christmas films
