= Nemesis (Davis novel) =

2010 historical crime novel by Lindsey Davis

- UK hardback cover, 2010
- Author: Lindsey Davis
- Language: English
- Series: Marcus Didius Falco
- Genre: Historical mystery crime novel
- Publisher: Century (imprint)
- Publication date: June 2010
- Publication place: United Kingdom
- Media type: Print (Hardback)
- Pages: 352
- ISBN: 978 1 846 05612 3
- OCLC: 267224251
- Preceded by: Alexandria

Nemesis is a 2009 historical mystery crime novel by Lindsey Davis and the 20th book of the Marcus Didius Falco Mysteries series. Set in Latium during AD 77, the novel stars Marcus Didius Falco, informer and imperial agent. In ancient Greece and Rome, Nemesis was the spirit of divine retribution against those who had succumbed to hubris (overweening pride). In the book, Falco is warned by Anacrites, the Imperial Chief Spy, to be wary of Nemesis following Falco's inheritance of his father's sizeable fortune, while the Claudii, the novel's primary antagonists who meet unpleasant endings, are revealed to have fallen foul of their hubris.

== Plot summary ==
The story, set in Latium in 77 AD, opens with the deaths of Falco's newborn son (posthumously named Justinianus) and Marcus Didius Geminus, alias Favonius, Falco's estranged father. Following the funeral, Falco is astounded to discover that his father has left him and the rest of the Didii family a sizeable fortune. There is a problem, before Geminus died, he impregnated Falco's friend Thalia and as a result, he is now forced to adopt Thalia's child when it is born.

Frustrated at this turn of events, Falco audits his father's business contacts, debtors and creditors but soon discovers a debt owed which was never paid because the creditor, Julius Modestus, has disappeared. He travels to the towns south of Rome with his adopted daughter Albia (who is unhappy that Falco's brother-in-law Aulus has married someone else) to look for Modestus but can't find him. He pays the debt owed to Modestus' nephew, Sextus Silanus (and to investigate the disappearance of Silanus' uncle) while his friend Lucius Petronius Longus, the captain of the vigiles in Rome's Twelfth District, finally discovers Modestus, who has been murdered and eviscerated. A clan of Imperial freedmen in the Pontine Marshes, the Claudii (consisting of four siblings named Nobilis, Probus, Virtus and Pius and their wives and female siblings) are implicated in Modestus' grisly murder but as Falco and Petronius investigate further, they attract the interest of the Imperial Chief Spy, Anacrites who, as usual, takes the case away from them.

Another victim emerges, a courier is found murdered and mutilated in the same manner as Modestus, while Anacrites' behaviour begins to become more erratic (and suspect) even as Falco and Petronius (covertly) investigate the murders further, eventually discovering more victims and the murderers, who are none other than the four Claudii brothers. It is thus discovered that Modestus may have been killed by the Claudii for attempting to speak out against them. Falco and Petro' find Pius prowling around Falco's house and abduct him; failing to extract any information from Pius, they send him away to become a slave in a mine. Virtus and Probus are finally apprehended while Nobilis dies by falling upon the swords of Falco and his comrades.

After the Claudii are wiped out, they surmise that the Claudii may have had a fifth brother who could be a confederate. The identity of this brother and his connections to Falco, his friends and the imperial government are finally deduced; Falco and Petronius realise that Anacrites has been manipulating them all along. The Didii, Camilli (Falco's in-laws) and Petronii families realise that they know too much and their lives (and possibly even the Flavian dynasty) are perhaps threatened by this missing brother. Forced to make a difficult decision, Falco and Petronius take matters into their hands, conspiring to "send Nemesis to deal with him" once and for all.

== Themes ==
- Rural life in the Pontine Marshes region of Italy in the Roman era
- Geminus' death, and its effect on Falco and his family fortunes (by way of inheritance)
- Anacrites' personal history and backstory
- Flavia Albia's emergence as an independent delatrix, anticipated in The Ides of April (2013)
