= Fall on Me (Andrea Bocelli and Matteo Bocelli song) =

2018 single by Andrea and Matteo Bocelli

Single by Andrea and Matteo Bocelli

from the album Sì
- Language: English; Italian ("Ven a Mi")
- Released: 20 September 2018
- Length: 4:18
- Label: Decca
- Songwriter(s): Ian Axel; Chad Vaccarino; Fortunato Zampaglione; Matteo Bocelli
- Producer(s): Bob Ezrin

Andrea Bocelli singles chronology
"Perfect Symphony" (2017)	"Fall on Me" (2018)	"If Only" (2018)

Music video
- "Fall on Me" on YouTube

"Fall on Me" is a song by Italian singer Andrea Bocelli and his son, Matteo Bocelli. It was released as a single on 20 September 2018. The song was written by the members of the American duo A Great Big World, and produced by Bob Ezrin. Matteo and Fortunato Zampaglione provided the Italian lyrics. Both the Italian and English versions were included on Bocelli's 2018 album, Sì. A music video was released for the soundtrack of the movie The Nutcracker and the Four Realms. The song played over the movie's end credits. The song was performed at the opening ceremony of the 2019 Summer Universiade in Naples on 3 July 2019.

== Background ==
The song is a piano ballad with lyrics seemingly calling "for the divine influence of a higher spiritual power".

== Charts ==
Chart (2018)	Peak position
Canada (Canadian Hot 100)	97

== A Great Big World and Christina Aguilera version ==
"Fall on Me"

Single by A Great Big World and Christina Aguilera

from the album Particles
- Released: 22 November 2019
- Recorded: 2019
- Length: 4:22
- Label: Epic
- Songwriter(s): Ian Axel; Chad King
- Producer(s): Dan Romer

A Great Big World singles chronology
"Boys in the Street" (2019)	"Fall on Me" (2019)	"I Will Always Be There" (2020)

Christina Aguilera singles chronology
"Haunted Heart" (2019)	"Fall on Me" (2019)	"Loyal Brave True" (2020)

Music video
- "Fall on Me" on YouTube

A Great Big World later recorded their own version as a duet with American singer Christina Aguilera. The song is the duo's second collaboration with Aguilera, following the single "Say Something", which peaked at No. 4 on the Hot 100 in 2013.

Released on November 22, 2019, "Fall on Me" became popular among hot adult contemporary radio programmers and was one of the most added HAC songs in mid-December that year.

=== Critical reception ===
"Fall on Me" received critical acclaim. Kelsie Gibson of PopSugar UK praised the song for its gentle vocal delivery and emotional lyrics. According to Idolator's Mike Wass "Fall on Me" is "every bit as touching and restrained" as "Say Something" — Aguilera and A Great Big World's 2013 hit — was. KEZR called the song "breathtaking". That Grape Juice noted that "Christina sounds incredible, so much so that it could be argued the song would be better suited solo. Still, it makes for an engaging listen in its current guise – especially lyrically." LATF The Magazine praised Axel for his "delicate [vocal] delivery", and a song for "a soulful turn from Aguilera".

=== Music video ===
The accompanying music video directed by Se Oh was premiered on 12 February 2020.

The video starts out with Ian Axel and Chad King entering a winter wonderland where a piano sits next to a tree as snow falls. It portrays Aguilera as an ethereal Queen of Spring and once her verse hits she magically makes an old tree and grove bloom with life after winter and continues singing with cherry blossoms fluttering in the wind.

=== Live performances ===
A Great Big World and Aguilera performed the song for the first time at the 2019 American Music Awards on 24 November 2019.

=== Charts ===
Chart (2019−2020)	Peak position
Canada Digital Song Sales (Billboard)	27
Mexico Ingles Airplay (Billboard)	14
Philippines (Music Weekly Asia)	15
US Adult Pop Songs (Billboard)	37
US Digital Song Sales (Billboard)	9
US Pop Digital Song Sales (Billboard)	8
