= The Iron Hand of Mars =

1992 novel by Lindsey Davis

- First edition
- Author: Lindsey Davis
- Language: English
- Series: Marcus Didius Falco
- Genre: Historical mystery Crime novel
- Publisher: Hutchinson
- Publication date: 1992
- Publication place: United Kingdom
- Media type: Print (hardback and paperback)
- Pages: 252 pp
- ISBN: 0-09-951508-3
- OCLC: 175283715
- Preceded by: Venus in Copper
- Followed by: Poseidon's Gold

The Iron Hand of Mars is a 1992 historical mystery crime novel by Lindsey Davis and the fourth book of the Marcus Didius Falco Mysteries series. Set in Rome and Germania during AD 71, the novel stars Marcus Didius Falco, informer and imperial agent. The iron in the title refers to the standard, shaped like a giant hand made of iron, which Falco is required to deliver to the imperial legions in Germany.

== Plot summary ==
Following the events of Venus in Copper, the Imperial authorities are seeking Falco out for an assignment in Germany (which given the events of his last mission abroad, Falco is slow to accept). Meanwhile, Falco is not pleased with Titus Caesar attempting to seduce Helena. When Helena gets an invitation to a private dinner with Titus, she pleads that Falco stay by her side on the same day, but he instead decides to see a client in Veii — who unfortunately turns out to be a widow more intent on pleasure than business. Disgusted, Falco returns to Rome, but Helena has disappeared, apparently leaving Falco for good. Romantically depressed, Falco goes over to the Palatine to be personally briefed by the emperor Vespasian on his latest assignment — broker peace between Rome and the Celtic tribes of Germany (whose leaders are thought to be Veleda, a priestess and Julius Civilis, a local strongman), locate a missing military officer named Munius Lupercus, and deliver a new standard in the form of a two-foot long human hand, cast in iron, to the 14th Gemina at Moguntiacum — the last actually being a pretext for Falco to investigate them, given that the 14th's loyalty is held in doubt. Much to Falco's annoyance, he is also to escort an ex-slave named Xanthus into Germany as well, whose speciality is hairdressing.

Falco's trip is marked by a number of misadventures — poor food and even poorer wine, unscrupulous souvenir sellers and cramped conditions, as well as murder. At Lugdunum, Falco and Xanthus bump into two travellers quarrelling with a group of potters, who are later found murdered. At the crime scene, Falco makes the acquaintance of a centurion named Helvetius, before trying to contact Helena's brother Justinus, a military tribune serving at Argentoratum, but discovers that Justinus has been transferred elsewhere, and so proceeds down the Rhenus further into Germany, where the relatively wealthy Xanthus is accosted by a peddler named Dubnus. Falco discovers that Dubnus is selling curios which may have been relics of Varus' ill-fated expedition, and asks Dubnus about Veleda, who tells him that she lives in a tower in the middle of the forest somewhere in the north.

At Moguntiacum, Falco tries to contact the local military legate, Florius Gracilis, but discovers that like Lupercus, Gracilis is missing. Falco finally meets Justinus and upon discussing Gracilis further, he discovers that Gracilis has been absent without leave, and his whereabouts are unknown, and in addition to his official duties, begins tracking down Gracilis. Running out of leads, Falco finally tries to make enquiries with the camp prefect of the 14th Legion, but accidentally lets it slip that he was part of the infamous 2nd Augusta. Brusquely driven off and humiliated, he is warned by to cease his inquiries. Later, three apparently drunk soldiers attack Falco, but he is saved by Xanthus who kills one of the soldiers, and finally discovers that Justinus has another guest, and it's none other than Helena, who has also brought along his niece, Augustinilla, because her mother, Victorina, is having "woman problems".

Falco and Helena go shopping and meet a German potter, Julius Mordanticus, whose uncle Bruccius has gone missing along with his cousin in Gaul. Falco immediately identifies Mordanticus' relatives as the men killed in Gaul, and tells Mordanticus to contact Helvetius, while Helena uncovers strong business rivalry between the potters of Lugdunum and Moguntiacum over commercial contracts to supply high-quality ceramics to the Roman army — suggesting that Gracilis himself was bribed by Lugdunum. Helena then buys a bowl from Julius Mordanticus for Falco to bring back as a gift for his mother in Rome.

Eventually, Falco goes north with Justinus, Dubnus, Helvetius and twenty young recruits from the 1st Aduitrix, another legion present in Moguntiacum, in search of Civilis and Veleda, but is captured by the Bructeri along with Helvetius and the twenty other soldiers. He manages to meet Veleda and tries to convince her that Vespasian wants to make peace, but Veleda refuses to listen to him. Just as things begin to look bleak, however, Justinus rides in and speaks with Veleda in Celtic, offering himself up as a hostage in return for the safe passage of Falco and his team back to civilisation. Veleda agrees and gives Falco a silver token taken from Lupercus' body. Apparently, Lupercus was murdered en route to Veleda. She asks Falco and Helvetius to use a galley captured from Petillius Cerialis (now decrepit from neglect) to escape so as to throw off the tribesmen's suspicion — she must not be seen aiding the Romans.

Justinus shortly after manages to rejoin the men, and tells Falco and Helvetius that Veleda does not wish for further war with Rome, and they take off in Cerialis' galley. Unfortunately, the galley is in poor shape and Falco and the men are soon shipwrecked in the lands of the Tencteri, a staunchly anti-Roman tribe, where they encounter the 14th Gemina's legate, Florius Gracilis, hunting for aurochs with the Gauls of Lugdunum, who then kill Helvetius. Gracilis and his followers soon decide to kill the survivors as well because they know too much, but Gracilis is gored to death by an aurochs, and Falco banishes the survivors of Gracilis' party. The Tencteri then attack Falco's party, but they are saved by the arrival of the 14th Gemina.

One last job remains to be solved — finding Civilis. Fortunately for Falco, his formidable niece Augustinilla managed to track down Civilis in Augusta Treverorum, and Falco goes to meet him, only to discover that Civilis is now an aged and broken man. Realising his time is up, Civilis agrees to accept Roman parole (as well as a new haircut from Xanthus!) Xanthus joins Civilis to start a new life as a freedman in Germany (although Falco now suspects that Xanthus was an Imperial agent meant to watch over Civilis). Back in Moguntiacum, a military parade is held to commemorate Vespasian's birthday, and the Iron Hand is officially handed over to the 14th Gemina. During the ceremony, Falco decides that Helena ought to marry Titus, but she asserts that she is staying put at Falco's side, and even writes the official report on the mission for Falco!

== Characters ==
=== In Rome ===
- Arria Silvia – Wife of Petronius Longus (friend of Falco's)
- Balbillus – Ex-legionary
- Canidius – A clerk of censored archives
- Decimus Camillus Verus – Senatorial father of Helena Justina.
- Helena Justina – Daughter of the Senator Decimus Camillus Verus
- Marcus Didius Falco – Informer and Imperial Agent from the Aventine.
- Titus Caesar – Eldest son of the Emperor.
- Xanthus – Barber
- Vespasian Augustus – Emperor of Rome.

=== In Germany ===
- Arminia – Friend of Augustinilla
- Augustinilla – Falco's niece
- Dubnus – Pedlar
- Julius Mordanticus – Potter
- Regina – Barmaid at the Medua

=== Belonging to the Fourteenth Legion ===
- A Macrinus – Senior Tribune
- Cornicularis – Commissariat Clerk
- Florius Gracilis – Legate, missing.
- Julia Fortunata – Mistress of Florius.
- Maenia Priscilla – Wife of Florius.
- Primipilus – Chief Centurion
- Rusticus – Slave, missing.
- S. Juvenalis – Camp Prefect

=== Belonging to the First Legion ===
- Dama – Centurion
- Lentullus – Recruit
- Q. Camillis Justinus Helveticus – Brother of Helena Justina, Tribune.

== Major themes ==
- Investigation into the disappearance of an imperial legate and the whereabouts of a rebel leader.
- Developing relationship of Marcus Didius Falco and Helena Justina.
- The pottery industry of Roman Gaul and Germany.
- Relations between Rome and the Celtic tribes of Germany during the Revolt of the Batavi.

== Allusions/references to actual history, geography and current science ==
- Set in Rome and Germania in AD 71, during the reign of Emperor Vespasian. The story takes place in the aftermath of a real rebellion by the Batavians and other Germanic tribes in AD 69–70. This is described by Tacitus in his Histories. However, much of this book has been lost and the Histories breaks off in the middle of the Batavian rebellion.

== Release details ==
- 1992, UK, Hutchinson, Hardback (out of print)
- 1993, UK, Arrow, Paperback ISBN 0-09-920091-0
- 1994, US, Crown/Ballantine ISBN 0-345-38024-X
- 1999, UK, Arrow, Paperback ISBN 0-7126-8018-7 (as part of single-volume omnibus edition, Falco on his Metal, with Venus in Copper and Poseidon's Gold)

== Adaptations in other media ==
- BBC Radio 4 starring Anton Lesser and Anna Madeley, first broadcast from 6 April 2007 in six parts.

== External links and quotations ==
- lindseydavis.co.uk Author's Official Website
