= Venus in Copper =

1991 novel by Lindsey Davis

- First edition cover
- Author: Lindsey Davis
- Language: English
- Series: Marcus Didius Falco
- Genre: Crime, Historical novel
- Publisher: Hutchinson
- Publication date: 1991
- Publication place: United Kingdom
- Media type: Print (hardback and paperback)
- Pages: 318 pp (Paperback)
- ISBN: 0-09-983170-8 (Paperback)
- OCLC: 24793560
- Preceded by: Shadows in Bronze
- Followed by: The Iron Hand of Mars

Venus in Copper is a 1991 historical mystery crime novel by Lindsey Davis and the third book of the Marcus Didius Falco Mysteries series. Set in Rome during AD 71, just after the year of the four emperors, the novel stars Marcus Didius Falco, informer and imperial agent. The copper of the title refers to a simple copper signet ring featuring a portrait of Venus, worn by the suspect Severina Zotica. That Venus was the goddess of love hints at the motives for some of the murders perpetrated by the suspect: revenge out of unrequited love.

== Plot summary ==
The story begins in Rome during late spring, AD 71. Falco is in the Latumiae Prison, accused by the spy Anacrites of having stolen lead ingots which were property of the State (as told in the previous novel Shadows in Bronze). Bailed out by his mother, Falco is heading across the city to visit Helena Justina when he is beaten up by his landlord's bullyboys for defaulting on his rent—despite having been bailed out by none other than Helena Justina. Marcus decides to resume working as an independent, despite the fact that this means he is unlikely to earn enough money to buy himself into a higher rank so that he can marry Helena.

Luck seems to smile down on Falco. A slave, Hyacinthus arrives at Falco's apartment in Fountain Court to ask him to assist the Hortensii, a trio of nouveau riche freedmen. Hyacinthus also recommends a real estate agent to Falco named Cossus, who eventually gets Falco a new home. Falco agrees to visit the Hortensii, who live on the Pincian Hill. There, Sabina Pollia informs him that all of the Hortensii (Crepito, Felix, Novus and their wives) live together in the one house. Novus is the only one currently unwed and he is due to marry Severina Zotica, but Sabina Pollia informs Falco that she believes Severina plans to murder Novus. Falco chooses to investigate Sabina's claims. At the same time he begins to hunt for a new apartment in which to live.

During the course of the investigation, Falco is once more arrested and imprisoned in the Latumiae by Anacrites, who brings forth his charges regarding the lead ingots (from the two novels preceding Venus in Copper) to Titus. Falco persuades Titus to free him, provided he repays whatever is owed for the lead to Emperor Vespasian, and is asked to undertake more work for the Palace. Falco agrees to be available provided he is paid for previous missions that have already been completed. This is agreed to by Titus, who then presents Falco with a huge turbot, which vexes Falco as he not only has to investigate Severina but to find a suitable way of cooking the turbot as well. The arrival of the turbot becomes the cause of an impromptu party amongst friends and family of the Didii. Helena arrives, complete with baggage with which to move in with Falco, only to discover that she had not been invited to the party. Distraught, she attempts to leave, but is prevented by the arrival of another guest, who turns out to be none other than Titus and the Praetorian Guards, who have arrived to sample the fish. At the end of the party, Helena chooses to stay on with Falco.

Returning to the house of the Hortensii, Falco discovers that Novus is dead in the privy after a banquet. He has been poisoned. Severina comes under suspicion, but Falco can find no real clue. Sabina wants to pay him off and considers him a failure, when the news arrives that Viridovix, the Hortensii's Gaulish cook, is also dead by poison. Continuing to investigate, Falco is beaten up badly by thugs working for Appius Priscillus, a rival of the Hortensii, but is rescued and nursed back to health by Helena. After he recovers, he continues to investigate but returns only to see the apartment block in which he is living collapse. Believing Helena to be inside, Falco and others begin to dig. Helena arrives just as all hope seems lost. By a freak accident, Helena and Falco run into Cossus after helping to search for other survivors in the rubble, and after interrogating Cossus (now revealed to be an operative for the Hortensii) they discover that the Hortensii owned Falco's apartment block. Cossus is lynched and crucified by an angry mob.

Falco and Helena conclude that Severina poisoned Novus as revenge because a building owned by Novus had previously collapsed, killing her lover, and had (as Novus' representative) tried to demolish Falco's home to kill Helena out of romantic jealousy. Falco confronts Priscillus, the Hortensii women and Severina Zotica. Priscillus and the Hortensii women are revealed to have been planning to kill Novus (who was threatening to evict the other freedmen from the Hortensii business), but were beaten to him by Severina. Falco forces Priscillus to leave Rome, and blackmails the Hortensii into buying his silence by "donating" to a charity set up by Helena. As for Severina, Falco is unable to prove anything, but Severina is blackmailed into marriage by an inquisitive public servant who has managed to obtain evidence of her past misdeeds.

Left with no home, Falco and Helena move back into Fountain Court.

== Characters ==
=== Friends, enemies and family ===
- Marcus Didius Falco – Informer and Imperial Agent from the Aventine.
- Helena Justina – Daughter of the Senator Decimus Camillus Verus, and romantic interest of Falco.
- Lucius Petronius Longus – Member of the Vigiles and friend of Falco.
- Anacrites – Imperial spy.
- Asiacus – Gladiator and bullyboy for Smaractus
- Decimus Camillus Verus – Senatorial father of Helena Justina.
- Famia – Horse doctor and brother-in-law of Falco, married to Maia.
- Gaius Baebius – Brother-in-law of Falco, married to Junia.
- Geminus – Auctioneer.
- Julia Justa – Mother of Helena Justina.
- Junia – Sister of Falco
- Lenia – A Laundress.
- Maia – Sister of Falco
- Rodan – Gladiator and bullyboy for Smaractus
- Smaractus – Falco's Landlord.
- Titus Caesar – Eldest son of the Emperor.
- Vespasian Augustus – Emperor of Rome.

=== Suspects and witnesses ===
- Anthea – Skivvy
- Appius Priscillus – Property mogul
- Cossus – A letting agent
- Hortensia Atila – Freedwoman and wife of Crepito
- Hortensius Crepito – Freedman and business partner of Novus
- Hortensius Felix – Freedman and business partner of Novus
- Hortensius Novus – A freedman, betrothed to Severina.
- Hyacinthus – Employed by the Hortensii
- Lusius – Praetor's clerk
- Minnius – Cake-seller
- Sabina Pollia – Freedwoman and wife of Felix
- Scaurus – Mason
- Severina Zotica – Suspect 'professional bride' with three deceased husbands.
- Thalia – Exotic dancer and snake charmer
- Tyche – Fortune-teller
- Viridovix – Gallic chef

=== Death toll ===
- Hortensius Novus – Found dead on the privy after being poisoned.
- Viridovix – Poisoned
- Cossus – Crucified by the crowd

== Major themes ==
- The debut of Thalia, a very important recurring character in the Falco series.
- Developing relationship of Marcus Didius Falco and Helena Justina.
- An insight into the darker side of the real estate trade in ancient Rome.

== Allusions/references to actual history, geography and current science ==
- Set in Rome in AD 71, during the reign of Emperor Vespasian.

== Adaptations in other media ==
- BBC World: Radio 4 starring Anton Lesser as Falco and Anna Madeley as Helena, with Tracey Wiles as Severina

== Release details ==
- 1991, UK, Hutchinson, Hardback
- 1992, UK, Arrow, ISBN 0-09-983170-8, Paperback
- 1993, US, Crown/Ballantine, ISBN 0-345-37390-1
- 1999, UK, Arrow, ISBN 0-7126-8018-7, Paperback (as part of single-volume Omnibus, Falco on his Metal, with The Iron Hand of Mars and Poseidon's Gold.)
- 2000, UK, Isis Audio, ISBN 0-7531-0688-4 (read by Christopher Scott)
