= Matteo Bocelli =

Italian singer

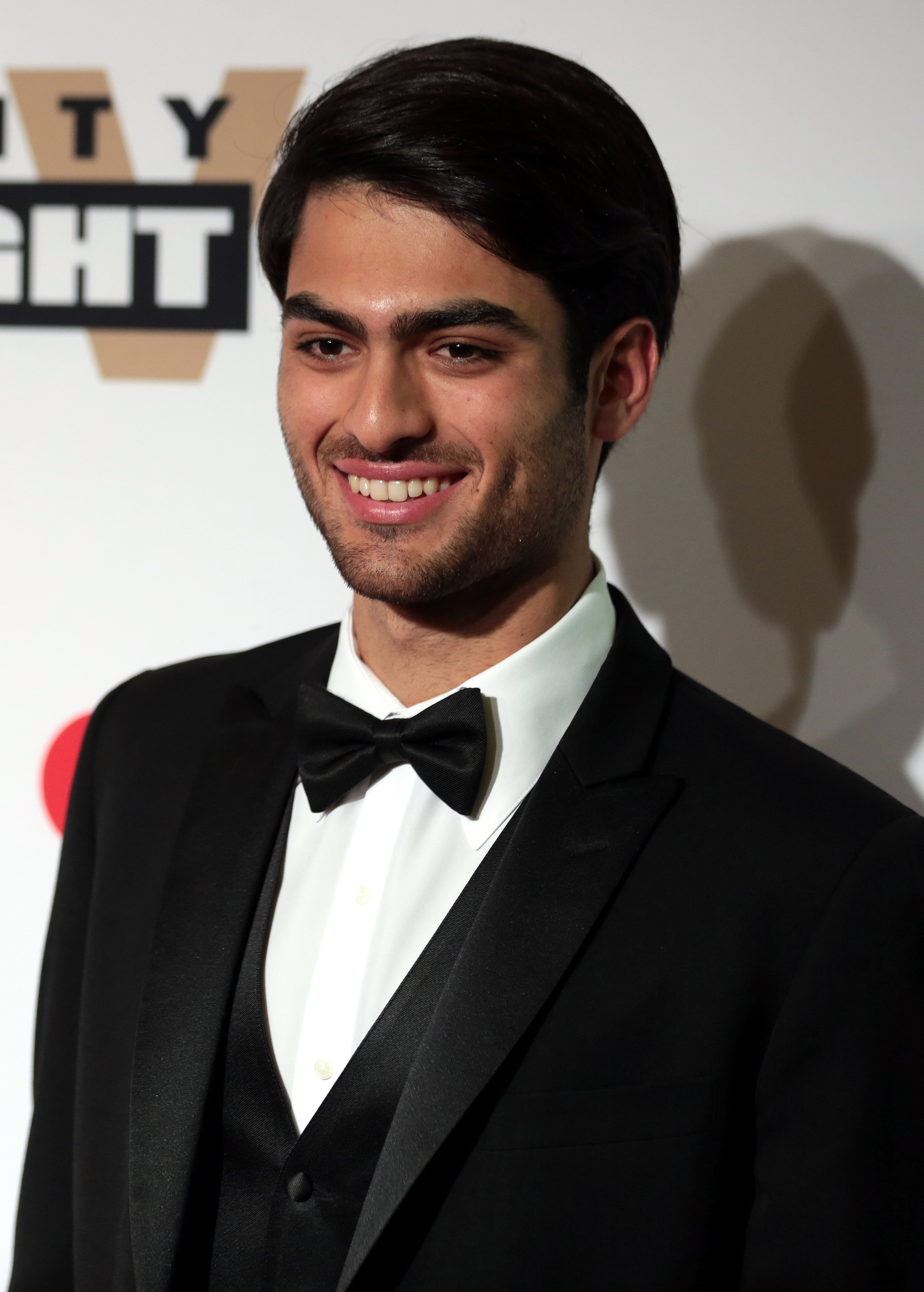
- Bocelli in 2018

Background information
- Born: Matteo Bocelli; October 8, 1997 (age 29); Forte dei Marmi, Italy
- Occupations: Singer; songwriter
- Instruments: Vocals, guitar
- Years active: 2016–present
- Labels: Decca; Capitol
- Website: www.matteobocelli.it

Matteo Bocelli (born October 8, 1997) is an Italian singer. He is the second child of Andrea Bocelli and Enrica Cenzatti.

As of 2025, Bocelli has released three studio albums. He has duetted with his father in his concerts and has been a featured artist on his father's albums.

In February 2026, he participated in the Viña del Mar International Song Festival, where, in addition to performing as a guest artist, he served as a judge. In this role, he evaluated the Folk and International competitions of the festival.

He was also proclaimed King of the Viña Del Mar Festival, after winning by a majority in the combined vote of the accredited press and the public, officially becoming the winner of the 2026 competition.

== Discography ==
=== Studio albums ===
List of studio albums with selected details
Title	Details	Peak chart positions							Certifications
Title	Details	ITA	AUS	BEL	GER	IRE	UK	US	Certifications
A Family Christmas (with Andrea and Virginia Bocelli)	Released: 21 October 2022; Label: Decca (Universal); Formats: CD, digital download	10	3	86	—	1	4	53	UK: Silver
Matteo	Released: 22 September 2023; Label: Capitol; Formats: CD, digital download	—	— (Note: Matteo did not enter the ARIA top 100, but peaked at number 2 on the ARIA Classical/Crossover Albums Chart.)	152	24	—	— (Note: Matteo did not enter the Official top 100, but peaked at number 72 on the Albums Sales Chart.)	—	
Falling in Love	Released: 12 September 2025; Label: Decca; Formats: CD, digital download	—	60	—	—	—	—	—	

=== Charted singles ===
List of charted singles, showing year released, chart positions, certifications, and album name
Title	Year	Peak chart positions			Album
Title	Year	CAN	UK Sales	POL Stream.	Album
"Fall on Me" (with Andrea Bocelli)	2018	97	34	—	Sì
"The Greatest Gift" (with Andrea and Virginia Bocelli)	2022	—	22	—	A Family Christmas
"Falling Back" (with Sanah)	2024	—	—	96	Matteo

== Filmography ==
Bocelli acted in the 2022 film Three Thousand Years of Longing, and sang the song "Cautionary Tale" over its closing credits.

=== Film ===
Key
†	Denotes films that have not yet been released

Year	Title	Role	Notes
2022	Three Thousand Years of Longing	Prince Mustafa	
2022	The Simpsons Meet the Bocellis in "Feliz Navidad"	Himself	Voice role; Short film
