= Romanesque architecture =

Medieval European architectural style

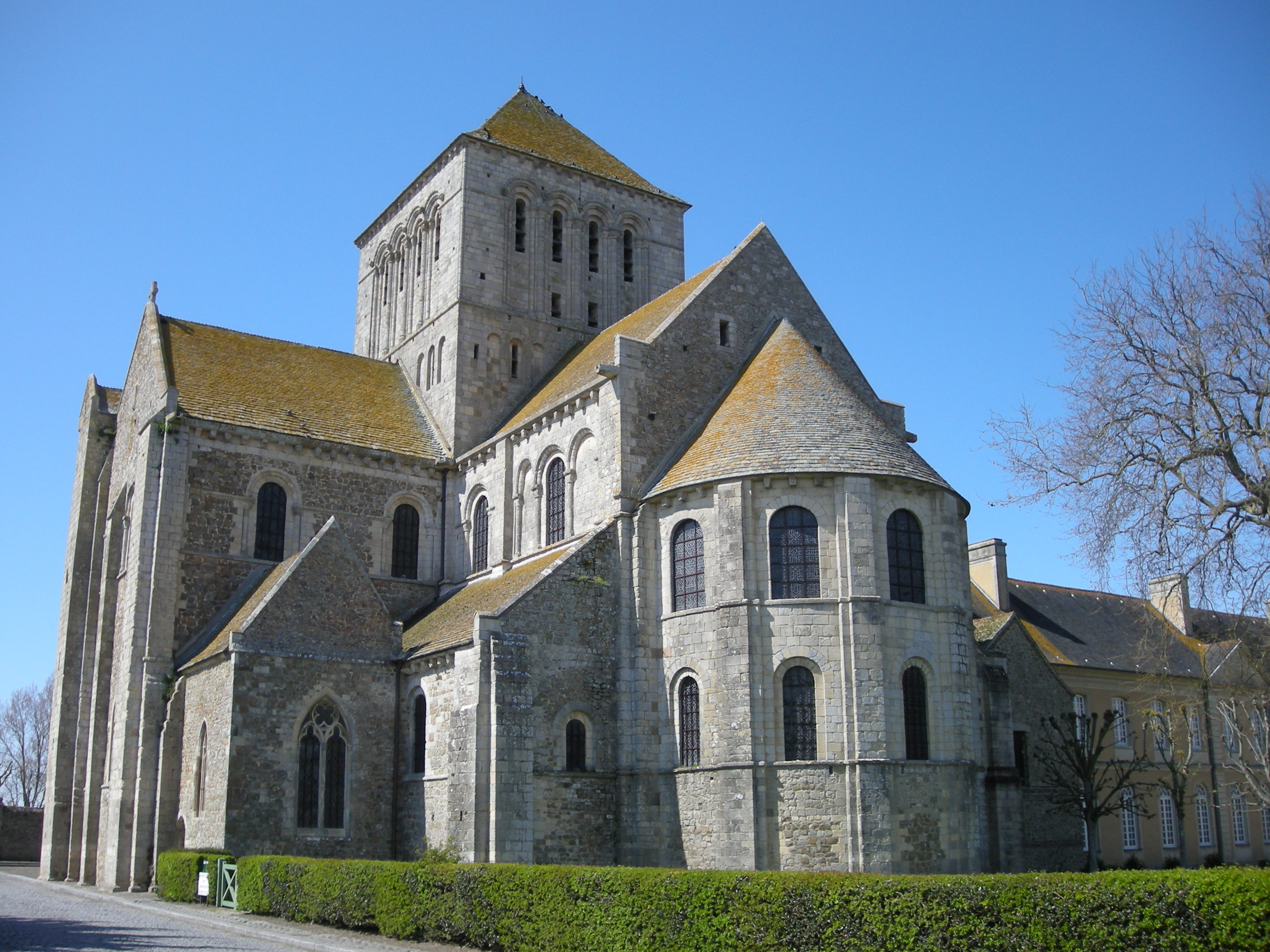
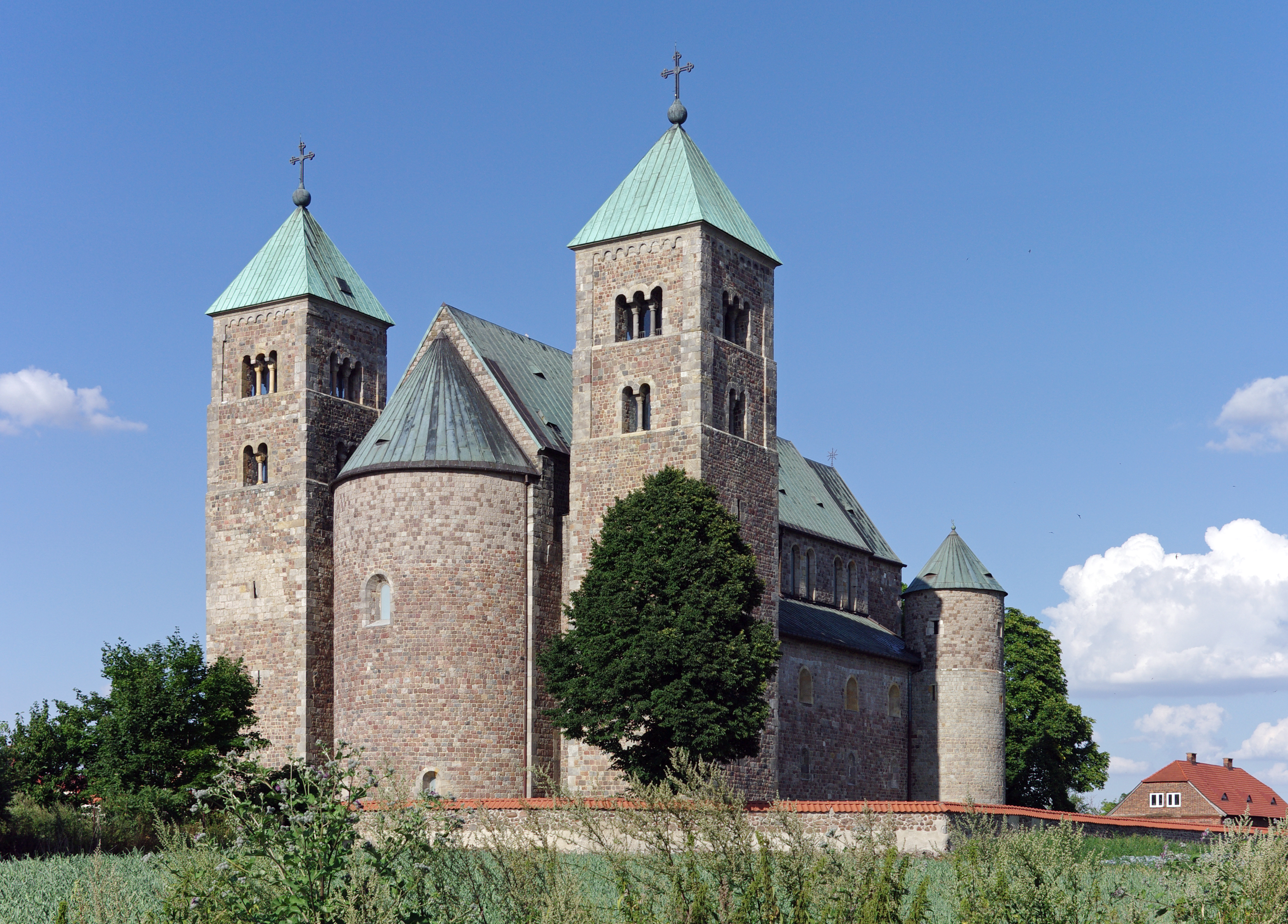
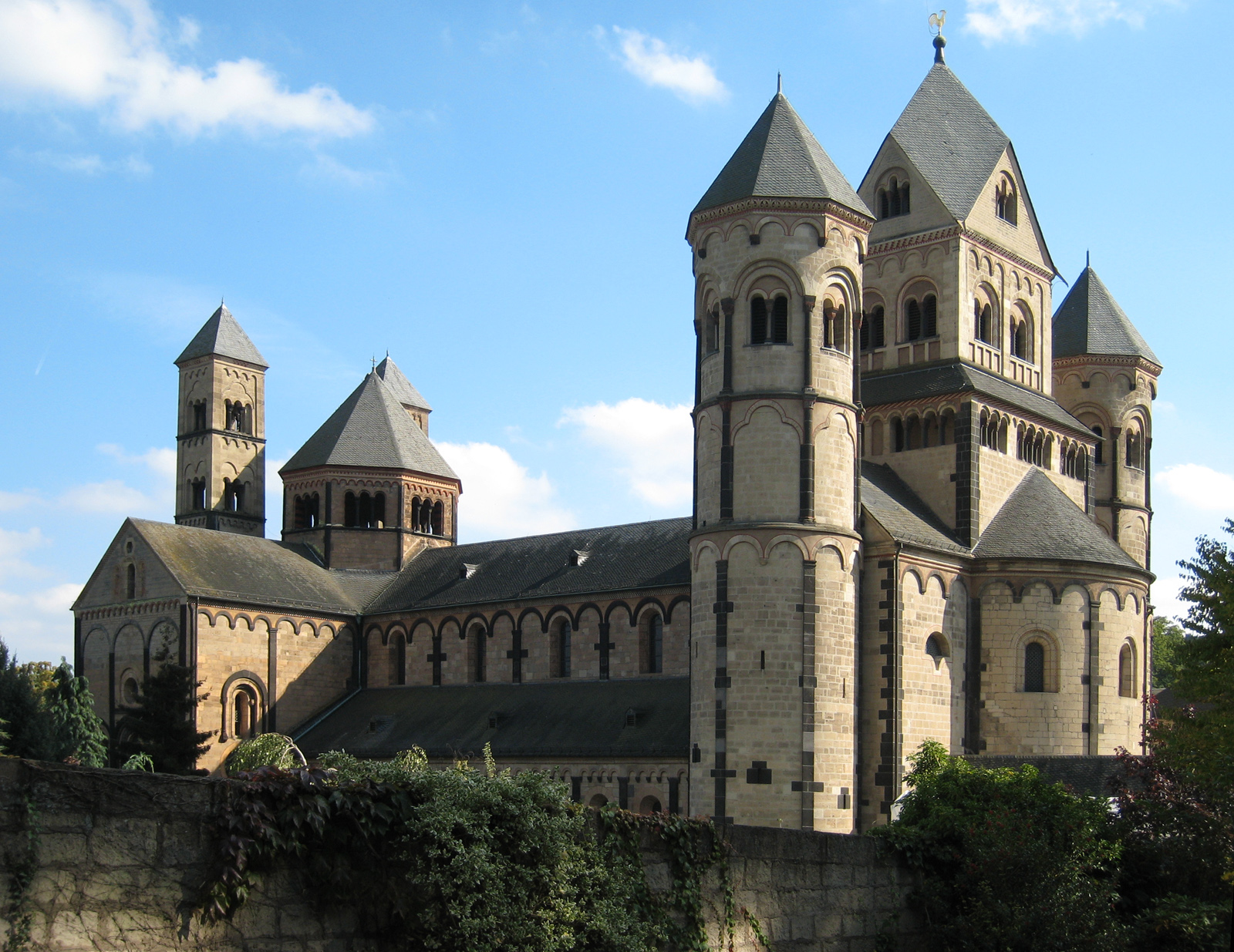
- Top: Lessay Abbey in Normandy (France); Middle: Collegiate Church in Tum (Poland); Bottom: Maria Laach Abbey (Germany)

Additional media
- Years active: 10th to 13th century
- Location: Catholic Europe
- Influenced: Gothic; Romanesque Revival

Romanesque architecture (Note: The style in contemporary Latin from various times goes by many names, such as e.g. Opus Romanum/Romanorum, Architectura Romana/Romanica, and Genere/Ordine Romanico (see terms and references on the Opus Romanum page on Latin Wikipedia).) is an architectural style of medieval Europe that was predominant in the 11th and 12th centuries. The style eventually developed into the Gothic style with the shape of the arches providing a simple distinction: the Romanesque is characterized by semicircular arches, while the Gothic is marked by the pointed arches. The Romanesque emerged nearly simultaneously in multiple countries of Western Europe; its examples can be found across the continent, making it the first pan-European architectural style since Imperial Roman architecture. As is the case with Gothic, the name of the style was transferred onto the contemporary Romanesque art.

Combining features of ancient Roman and Byzantine buildings and other local traditions, Romanesque architecture is known by its massive quality, thick walls, round arches, sturdy pillars, barrel vaults, large towers and decorative arcading. Each building has clearly defined forms, frequently of very regular, symmetrical plan. The overall appearance is one of simplicity when compared with the Gothic buildings that were to follow. The style can be identified right across Europe, despite regional characteristics and different materials.

Many castles were built during this period, but they are greatly outnumbered by churches. The most significant are the great abbey churches, many of which are still standing, more or less complete and frequently in use. The enormous quantity of churches built in the Romanesque period was succeeded by the still busier period of Gothic architecture, which partly or entirely rebuilt most Romanesque churches in prosperous areas like England and Portugal. The largest groups of Romanesque survivors are in areas that were less prosperous in subsequent periods, including parts of southern France, rural Spain, rural Portugal and rural Italy. Survivals of unfortified Romanesque secular houses and palaces, and the domestic quarters of monasteries are far rarer, but these used and adapted the features found in church buildings, on a domestic scale.

== Definition ==
The French term "romane" or the English Romanesque, meaning "in the manner of Romans", has been used to describe the architectural style of the Mediaeval era, preceding the more easily recognizable Gothic architecture, since early in the 19th century. It describes the architectural style which flourished across Europe from the 11th to the 13th century, and is distinguished from the Gothic style that followed by semi-circular arches and more massive forms. The development of vaults from barrel and groin vaults to ribbed vaults was the main structural innovation of this period.

Typical Romanesque architectural forms

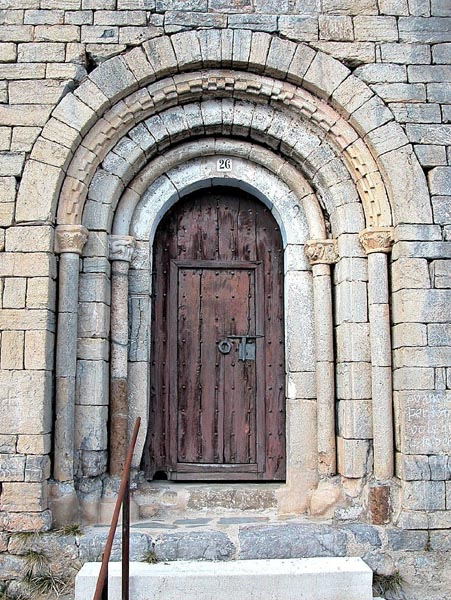
Portal, Church of Santa Maria, Viu de Llevata, Catalonia, Spain

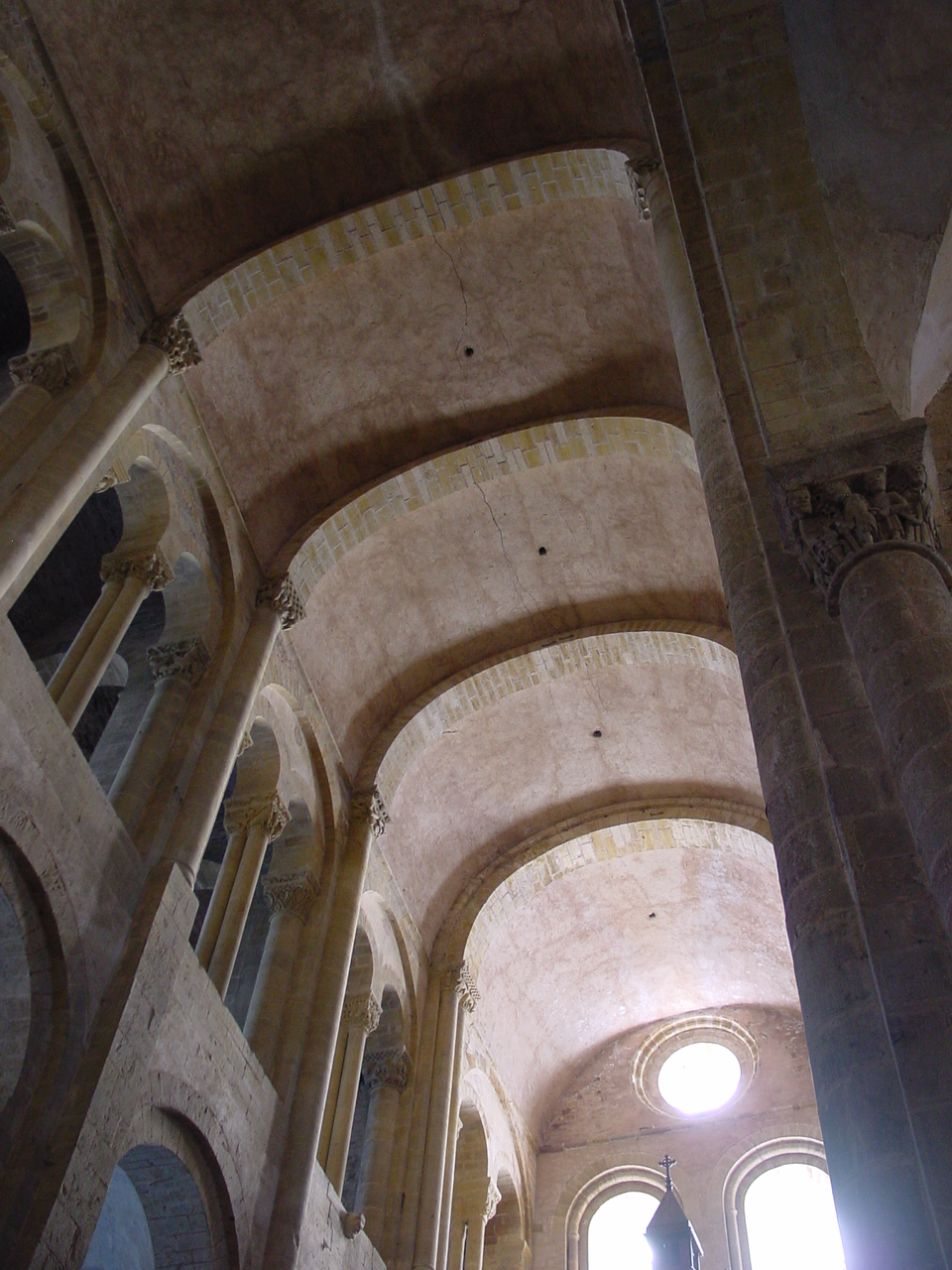
The vault at the Abbey Church of Sainte-Foy, Conques, France

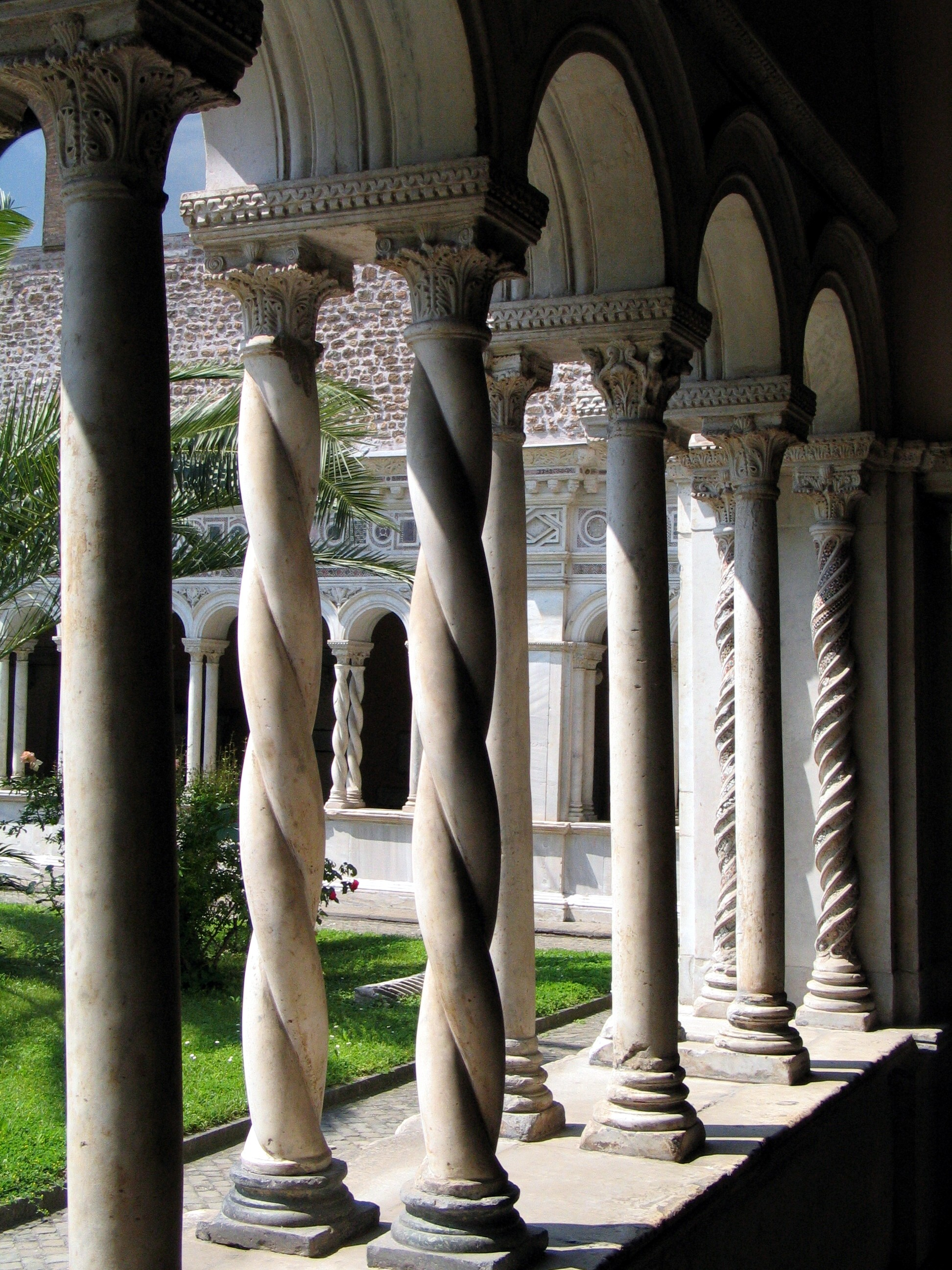
Cloister of the Basilica di San Giovanni in Laterano, Rome

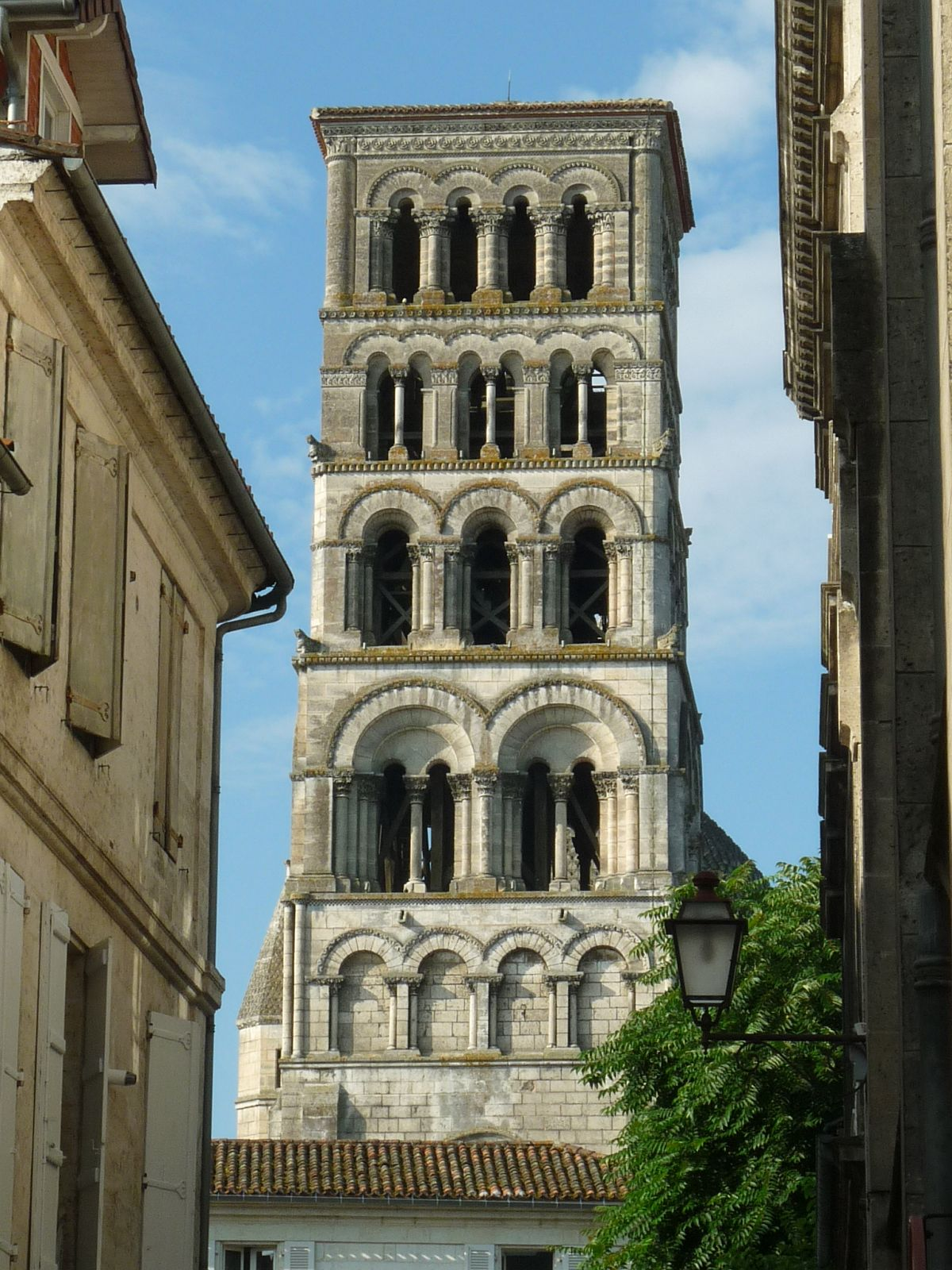
Bell tower of Angoulême Cathedral, Charente, SW France

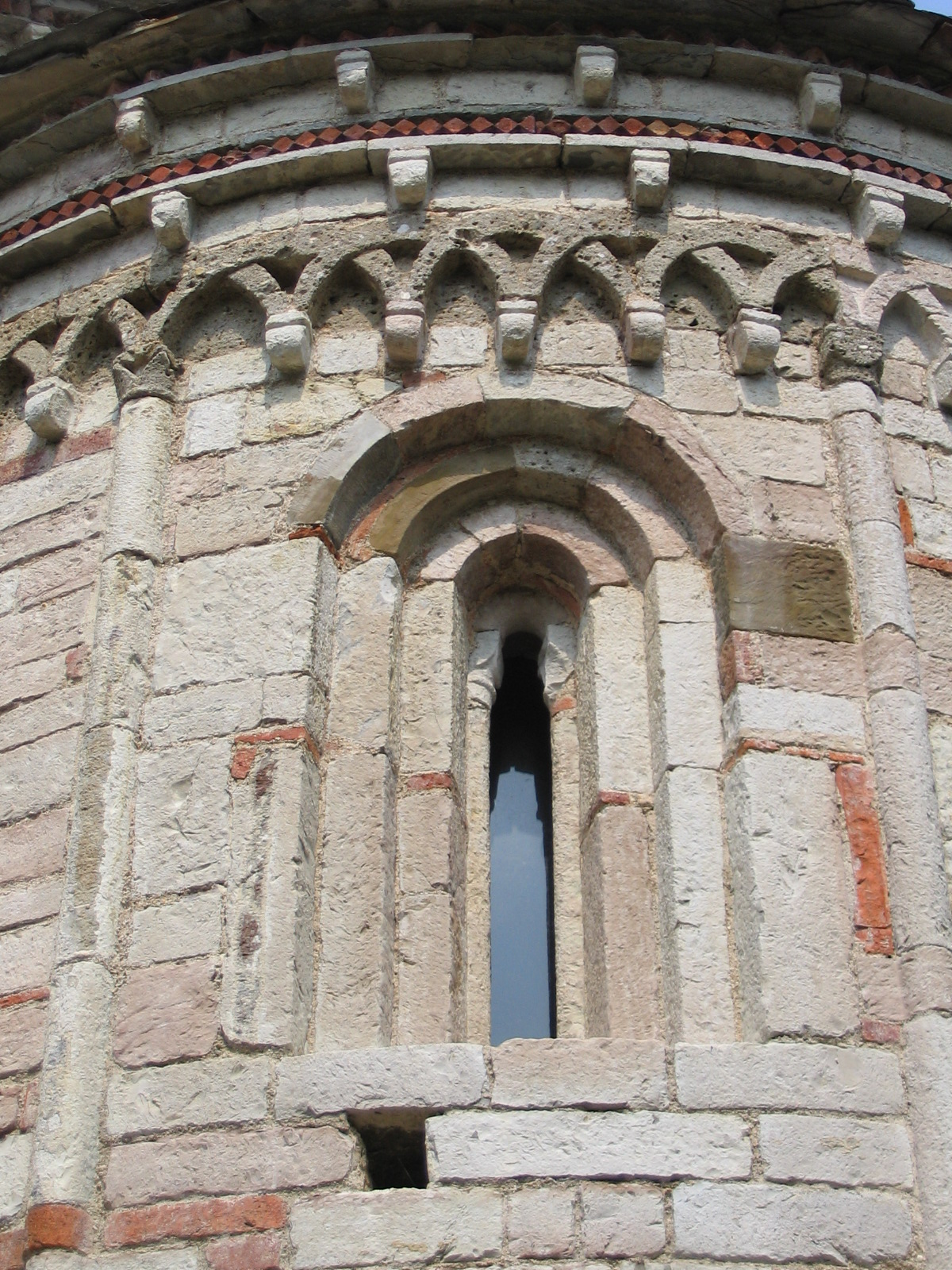
Window and Lombard band of the Rotunda of San Tomè, Almenno San Bartolomeo

Window showing typical paired openings with central shaft,under a single arch. St. Fides, Selestat, Alsace

== Use of the term Romanesque ==
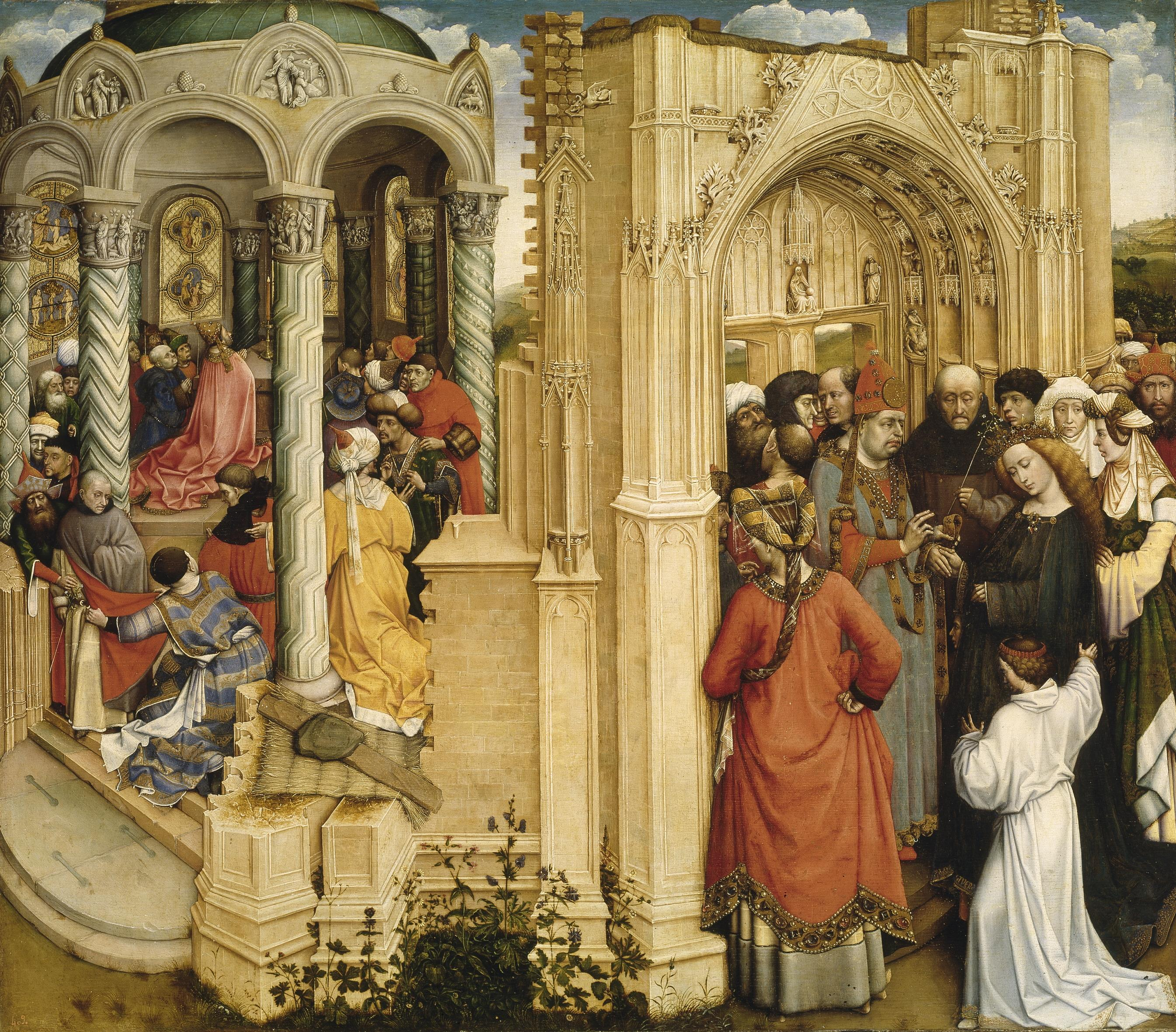
Marriage of the Virgin (Robert Campin, c. 1420–1430)

The distinction between the style of architecture now known as Romanesque and the succeeding style of Gothic architecture was recognised as early as the 15th century, as demonstrated by some artworks of that period. Robert Campin clearly presented the division in his Marriage of the Virgin; on the left side, representing the Old Testament, the building is in the Romanesque style, while that on the right, representing the New Testament, is Gothic. Until the 19th century, however, the style preceding Gothic was not recognized as a whole, and was instead, just like Gothic at the time, treated as a multitude of styles: Giorgio Vasari and Christopher Wren were writing about "Tuscan", "Saxon", and "Norman" architectures.

The word Romanesque ("in the manner of Romans") appeared in English by 1666, and was used to designate what are now called Romance languages. Definition of Romanesque architecture changed over time; the development of the modern English meaning of the word involved primarily two steps:

- in 1813 William Gunn used the term to broadly describe the pre-Gothic architecture of Western Europe, all the way from the 4th century to the 12th. Gunn's work, An Inquiry into the Origin and Influence of Gothic Architecture (London 1819), was published later, in 1819. The word was used by Gunn to describe the style that was identifiably medieval and prefigured the Gothic, yet maintained the rounded Roman arch and thus appeared to be a continuation of the Roman tradition of building;
- over the course of the 19th century and the first half of the 20th century the definition narrowed to a shorter period, typically from 11th (or late 10th) to 12th century. In the process, scholars (with notable contributions by Robert de Lasteyrie and Henri Focillon) changed the original definition of Romanesque as a sub-Roman or Roman-like architecture to a stylistic label describing the arrangements of mass and space that found acceptance at the turn of the 11th century. The new definition also marks the watershed between the tribal/dynastic treatment of architectural styles (Roman, Merovingian, Carolingian, Ottonian.) and a feature-based one (Gothic, Renaissance, Mannerist, Baroque).

The French term "romane" was first used in the architectural sense by archaeologist Charles de Gerville in a letter of 18 December 1818 to Auguste Le Prévost to describe what Gerville sees as a debased Roman architecture. (Note: Gerville (1818): French: Je vous ai quelquefois parlé d'architecture romane. C'est un mot de ma façon qui me paraît heureusement inventé pour remplacer les mots insignifiants de saxone et de normande. Tout le monde convient que cette architecture, lourde et grossière, est l'opus romanum dénaturé ou successivement dégradé par nos rudes ancêtres. Alors aussi, de la langue latine, également estropiée, se faisait cette langue romane dont l'origine et la dégradation ont tant d'analogie avec l'origine et les progrès de l'architecture. Dites-moi donc, je vous prie, que mon nom romane est heureusement trouvé. (I have sometimes spoken to you about Romanesque architecture. It is a word of my own which I invented (I think successfully) to replace the insignificant words of Saxon and Norman. Everyone agrees that this architecture, heavy and rough, is the opus romanum successively denatured or degraded by our rude ancestors. So too, out of the crippled Latin language, was made this Romance language whose origin and degradation have so much analogy with the origin and progress of architecture. Tell me, please, that my name Roman (esque) was invented with success.)) In an 1823 public lecture (published in 1824) Gerville's friend Arcisse de Caumont adopted the label "roman" to describe the "degraded" European architecture from the 5th to the 13th centuries, in his Essai sur l'architecture religieuse du moyen-âge, particulièrement en Normandie, at a time when the actual dates of many of the buildings so described had not been ascertained:

"The name Roman (esque) we give to this architecture, which should be universal as it is the same everywhere with slight local differences, also has the merit of indicating its origin and is not new since it is used already to describe the language of the same period. Romance language is degenerated Latin language. Romanesque architecture is debased Roman architecture." (Note: de Caumont (1824): French: Le nom romane que nous donnons à cette architecture, qui ne doit avoir qu'un puisqu'elle est partout la même sauf de légères differences de localité, a d'ailleurs le mérite d'en indiquer l'origine et il n'est pas nouveau puisqu'on s'en sert déjà pour désigner la langue du même temps La langue romane est la langue latine dégénérée. L'architecture romane est l'architecture romaine abâtardie.)

The term "Pre-romanesque" is sometimes applied to architecture in Germany of the Carolingian and Ottonian periods and Visigothic, Mozarab and Asturian constructions between the 8th and the 10th centuries in the Iberian Peninsula while "First Romanesque" is applied to buildings in north of Italy and Spain and parts of France that have Romanesque features but pre-date the influence of the Abbey of Cluny. The Romanesque style in England and Sicily is still referred to as Norman architecture. A "dazzling" style developed in Pisa in the mid-11th century is called "Pisan Romanesque".

Eric Fernie writes that by the beginning of the 21st century there is "something like agreement" on the characteristics of the Romanesque style. Some researchers argue that due to an "astonishing diversity" of the Romanesque buildings, a unanimous definition is impossible: "[n]o single model, no single rule, ever seems adequate to prevail", and the Romanesque should be treated as a "collection of trends". Despite disagreement, the term became a "common currency", and is universally accepted at least for convenience.

== Scope ==
Buildings of every type were constructed in the Romanesque style, with evidence remaining of simple domestic buildings, elegant town houses, grand palaces, commercial premises, civic buildings, castles, city walls, bridges, village churches, abbey churches, abbey complexes and large cathedrals. Of these types of buildings, domestic and commercial buildings are the most rare, with only a handful of survivors in the United Kingdom, several clusters in France, isolated buildings across Europe and by far the largest number, often unidentified and altered over the centuries, in Italy. Many castles exist, the foundations of which date from the Romanesque period. Most have been substantially altered, and many are in ruins.

By far the greatest number of surviving Romanesque buildings are churches. These range from tiny chapels to large cathedrals. Although many have been extended and altered in different styles, a large number remain either substantially intact or sympathetically restored, demonstrating the form, character and decoration of Romanesque church architecture.

The scope of Romanesque architecture

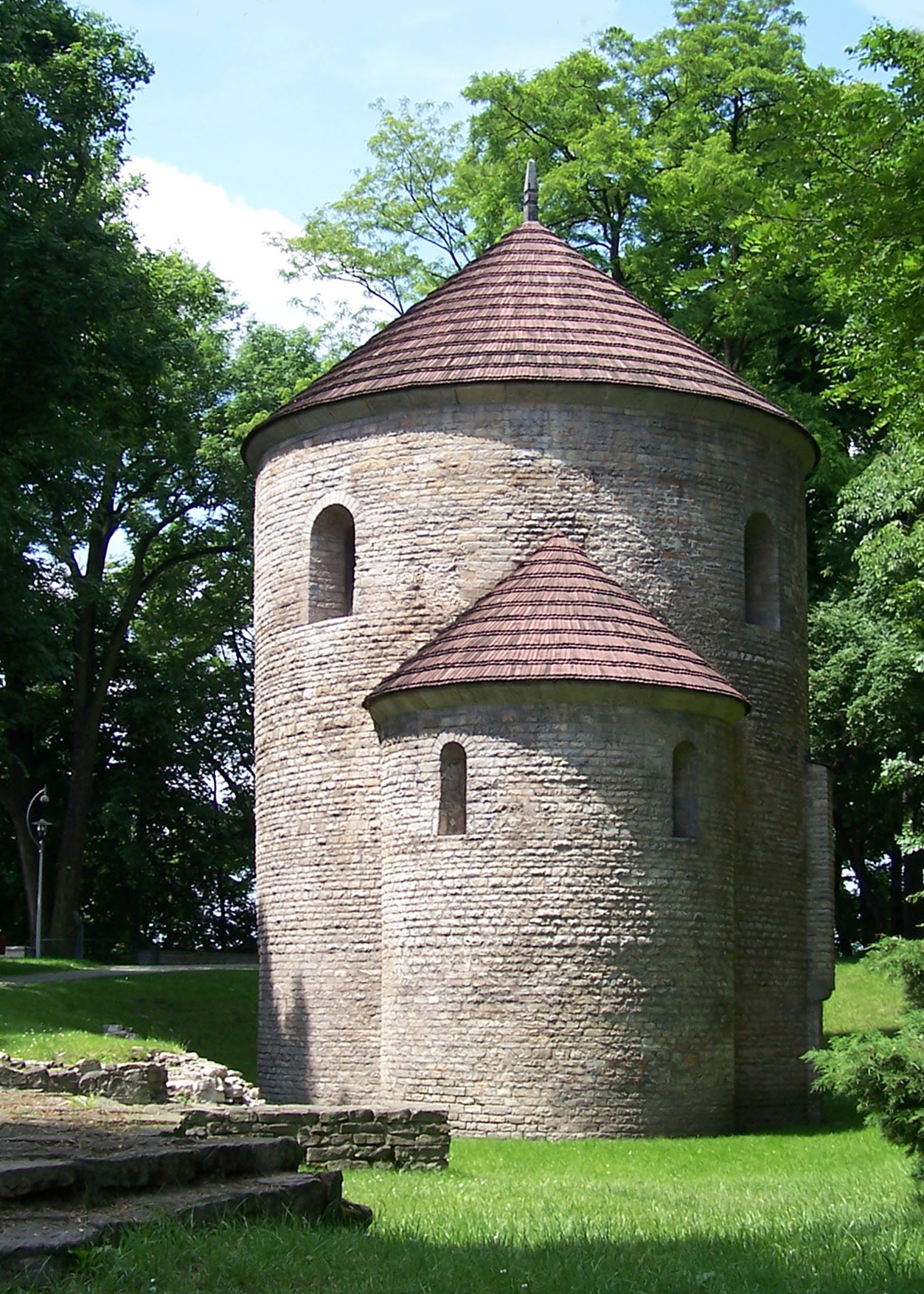
Saint Nicholas Rotunda in Cieszyn, Poland

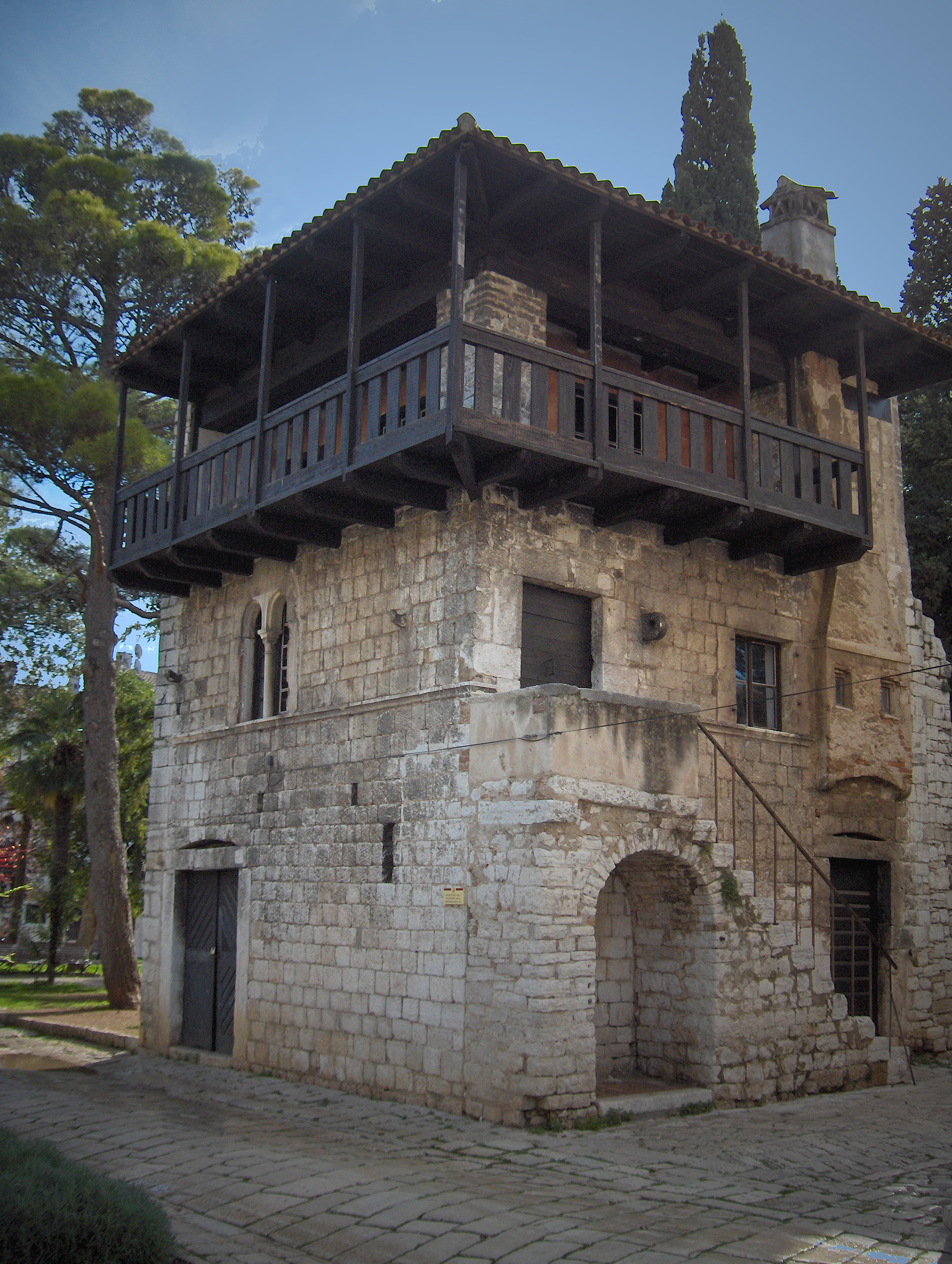
Romanesque house in Poreč, Croatia

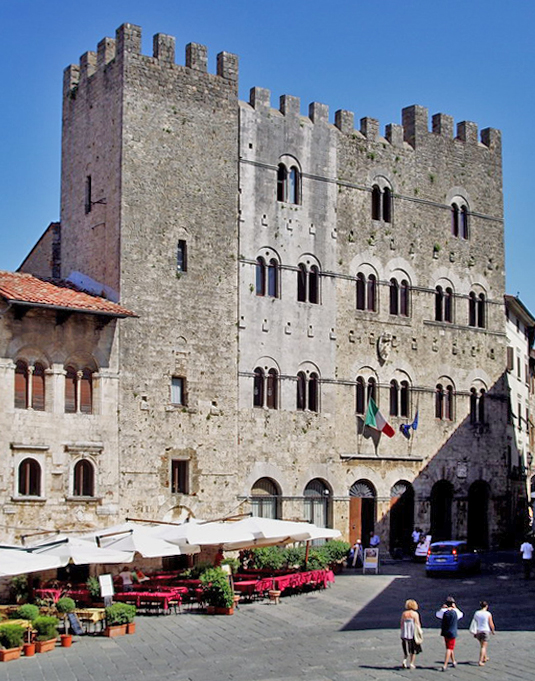
The Civic Hall in Massa Marittima, Italy

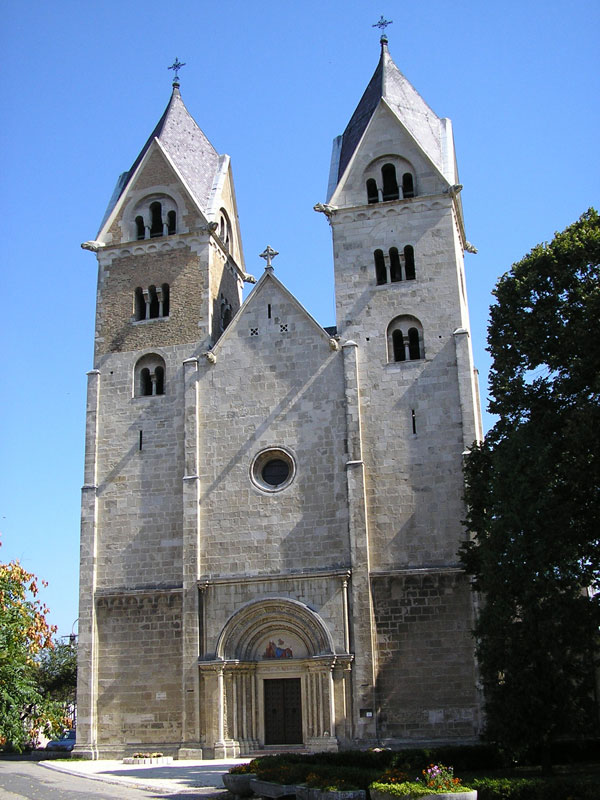
Abbey Church of St James, Lébény, Hungary (1208)

The keep of Hedingham Castle, Essex, England

== History ==
=== Origins ===
Romanesque architecture was the first distinctive style to spread across Europe since the Roman Empire. With the decline of Rome, Roman building methods survived to an extent in Western Europe, where successive Merovingian, Carolingian and Ottonian architects continued to build large stone buildings such as monastery churches and palaces. In the more northern countries, Roman building styles and techniques had never been adopted except for official buildings, while in Scandinavia they were unknown. Although the round arch continued in use, the engineering skills required to vault large spaces and build large domes were lost. There was a loss of stylistic continuity, particularly apparent in the decline of the formal vocabulary of the Classical Orders.

In Rome several great Constantinian basilicas continued in use as an inspiration to later builders. Some traditions of Roman architecture also survived in Byzantine architecture with the 6th-century octagonal Byzantine Basilica of San Vitale in Ravenna being the inspiration for the greatest building of the Early Middle Ages in Europe, the Emperor Charlemagne's Palatine Chapel, Aachen, Germany, built around the year AD 800.

Dating shortly after the Palatine Chapel is a remarkable 9th-century Swiss manuscript known as the Plan of Saint Gall and showing a very detailed plan of a monastic complex, with all its various monastic buildings and their functions labelled. The largest building is the church, the plan of which is distinctly Germanic, having an apse at both ends, an arrangement not generally seen elsewhere. Another feature of the church is its regular proportion, the square plan of the crossing tower providing a module for the rest of the plan. These features can both be seen at the Proto-Romanesque St. Michael's Church, Hildesheim, 1001–1030.

Architecture of a Romanesque style also developed simultaneously in the north of Italy, parts of France and in the Iberian Peninsula in the 10th century and prior to the later influence of the Abbey of Cluny. The style, sometimes called First Romanesque or Lombard Romanesque, is characterised by thick walls, lack of sculpture and the presence of rhythmic ornamental arches known as a Lombard band.

Origins

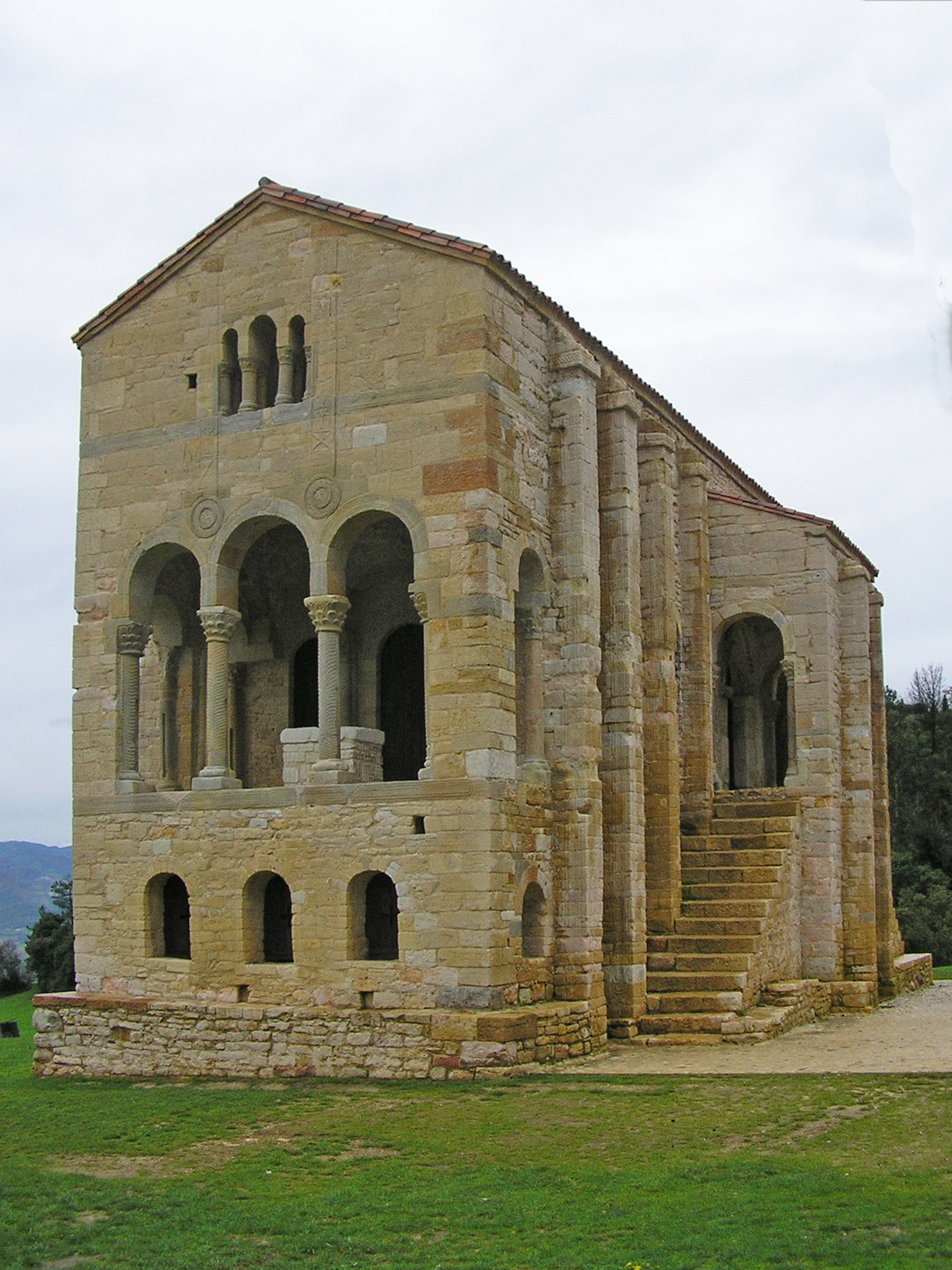
Santa María del Naranco, Oviedo, Spain, AD 848. Built as a palace for Ramiro I of Asturias.

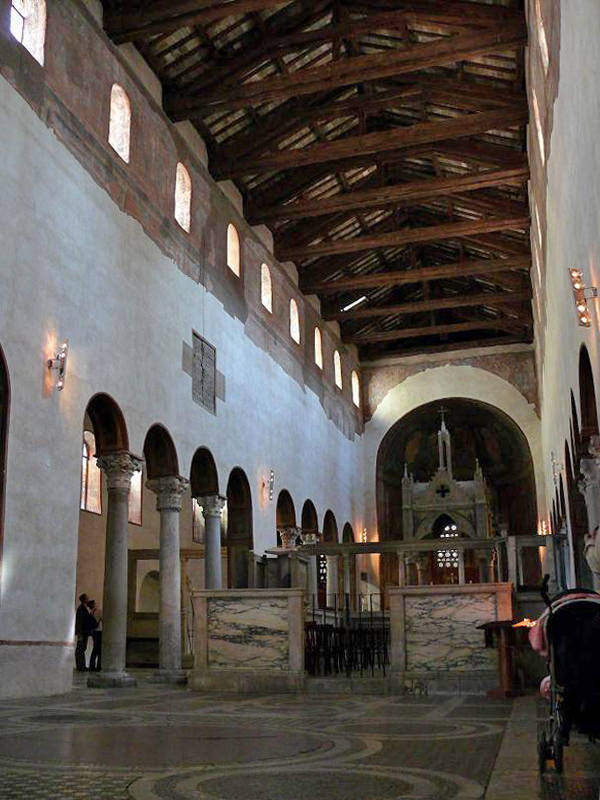
Santa Maria in Cosmedin, Rome (8th – early 12th century) has a basilical plan and reuses ancient Roman columns.

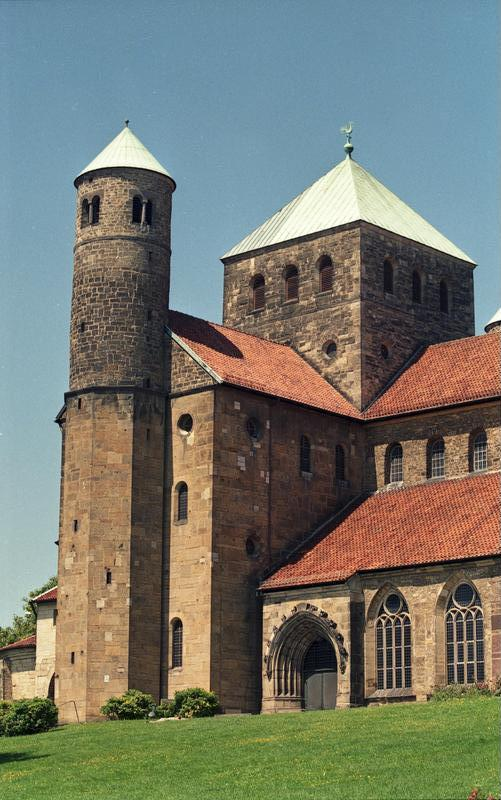
St. Michael's Church, Hildesheim has similar characteristics to the church in the Plan of Saint Gall.

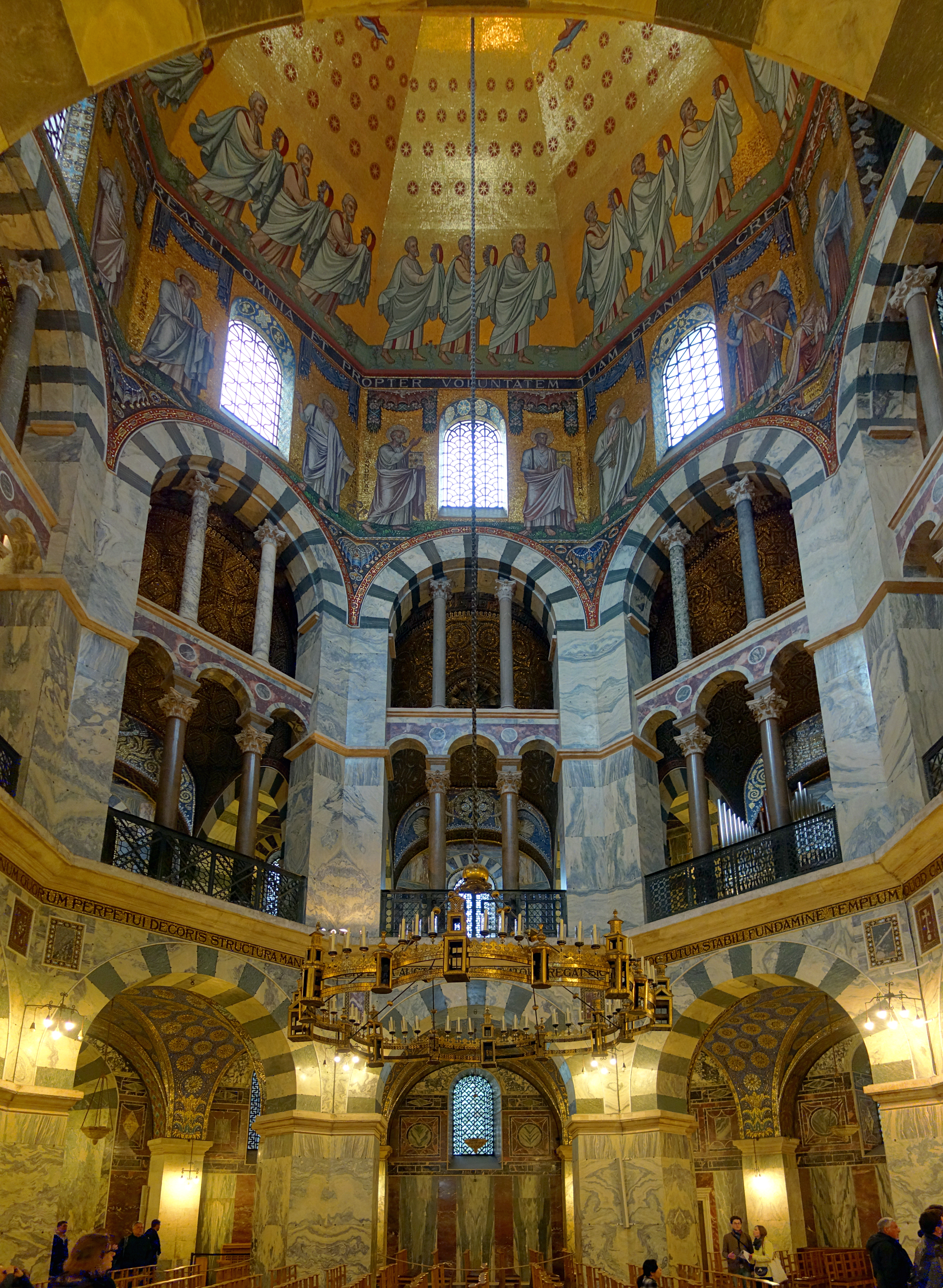
Charlemagne's Palatine Chapel, Aachen, Germany, 9th century, modelled on the Byzantine church of San Vitale, Ravenna

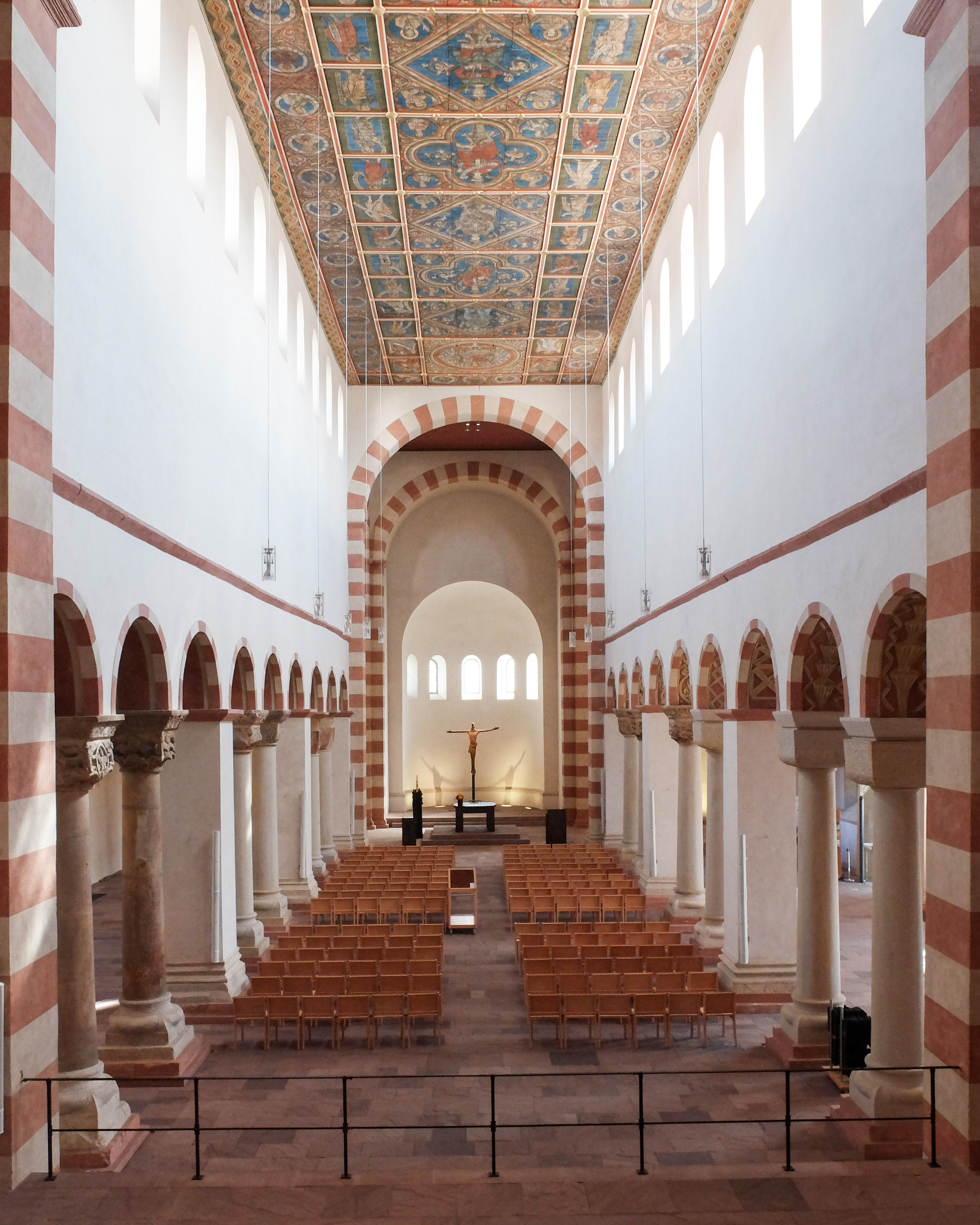
Interior of St. Michael's, Hildesheim, Germany, (1001–1031) with alternating piers and columns and a 13th-century painted wooden ceiling

=== Politics ===
Charlemagne was crowned by Pope Leo III in Old St. Peter's Basilica on Christmas Day of 800, with an aim to re-establishing the old Roman Empire. Charlemagne's political successors continued to rule much of Europe, with a gradual emergence of the separate political states that were eventually to become welded into nations, either by allegiance or defeat, into the Kingdom of Germany giving rise to the Holy Roman Empire. The invasion of England by William, Duke of Normandy, in 1066, saw the building of both castles and churches that reinforced the Norman presence. Several significant churches that were built at this time were founded by rulers as seats of temporal and religious power, or places of coronation and burial. These include the Abbaye-Saint-Denis, Speyer Cathedral and Westminster Abbey (where little of the Pre-Conquest church now remains).

At a time when the remaining architectural structures of the Roman Empire were falling into decay and much of its learning and technology lost, the building of masonry domes and the carving of decorative architectural details continued unabated, though greatly evolved in style since the fall of Rome, in the enduring Byzantine Empire. The domed churches of Constantinople and Eastern Europe were to greatly affect the architecture of certain towns, particularly through trade and through the Crusades. The most notable single building that demonstrates this is St Mark's Basilica, Venice, but there are many lesser-known examples, particularly in France, such as the church of Saint-Front, Périgueux and Angoulême Cathedral.

Much of Europe was affected by feudalism in which peasants held tenure from local rulers over the land that they farmed in exchange for military service. The result of this was that they could be called upon, not only for local and regional spats, but to follow their lord to travel across Europe to the Crusades, if they were required to do so. The Crusades, 1095–1270, brought about a very large movement of people and, with them, ideas and trade skills, particularly those involved in the building of fortifications and the metal working needed for the provision of arms, which was also applied to the fitting and decoration of buildings. The continual movement of people, rulers, nobles, bishops, abbots, craftsmen and peasants, was an important factor in creating a homogeneity in building methods and a recognizable Romanesque style, despite regional differences.

Life became generally less secure after the Carolingian period. This resulted in the building of castles at strategic points, many of them being constructed as strongholds of the Normans, descendants of the Vikings who invaded northern France under Rollo in 911. Political struggles also resulted in the fortification of many towns, or the rebuilding and strengthening of walls that remained from the Roman period. One of the most notable surviving fortifications is that of the city of Carcassonne. The enclosure of towns brought about a lack of living space within the walls, and resulted in a style of town house that was tall and narrow, often surrounding communal courtyards, as at San Gimignano in Tuscany and Bologna and Pavia in Lombardy.

In Germany, the Holy Roman Emperors built a number of residences, fortified, but essentially palaces rather than castles, at strategic points and on trade routes. The Imperial Palace of Goslar (heavily restored in the 19th century) was built in the early 11th century by Otto III and Henry III, while the ruined Palace at Gelnhausen was received by Frederick Barbarossa prior to 1170. The movement of people and armies also brought about the building of bridges, some of which have survived, including the 12th-century bridge at Besalú, Catalonia, the 11th-century Puente de la Reina, Navarre and the Pont-Saint-Bénézet, Avignon.

Politics

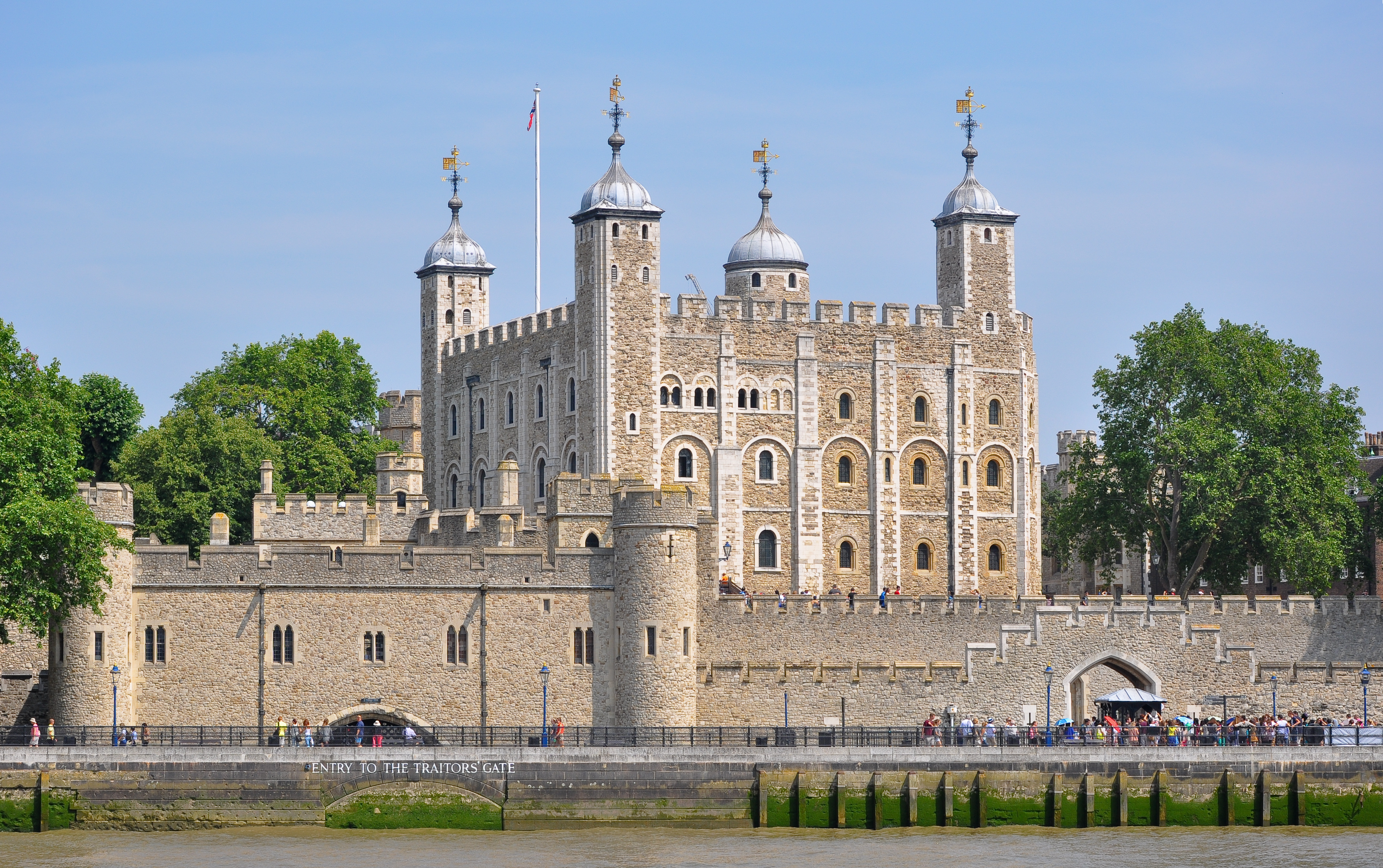
The Tower of London (1078); William the Conqueror built the central White Tower as his stronghold and residence

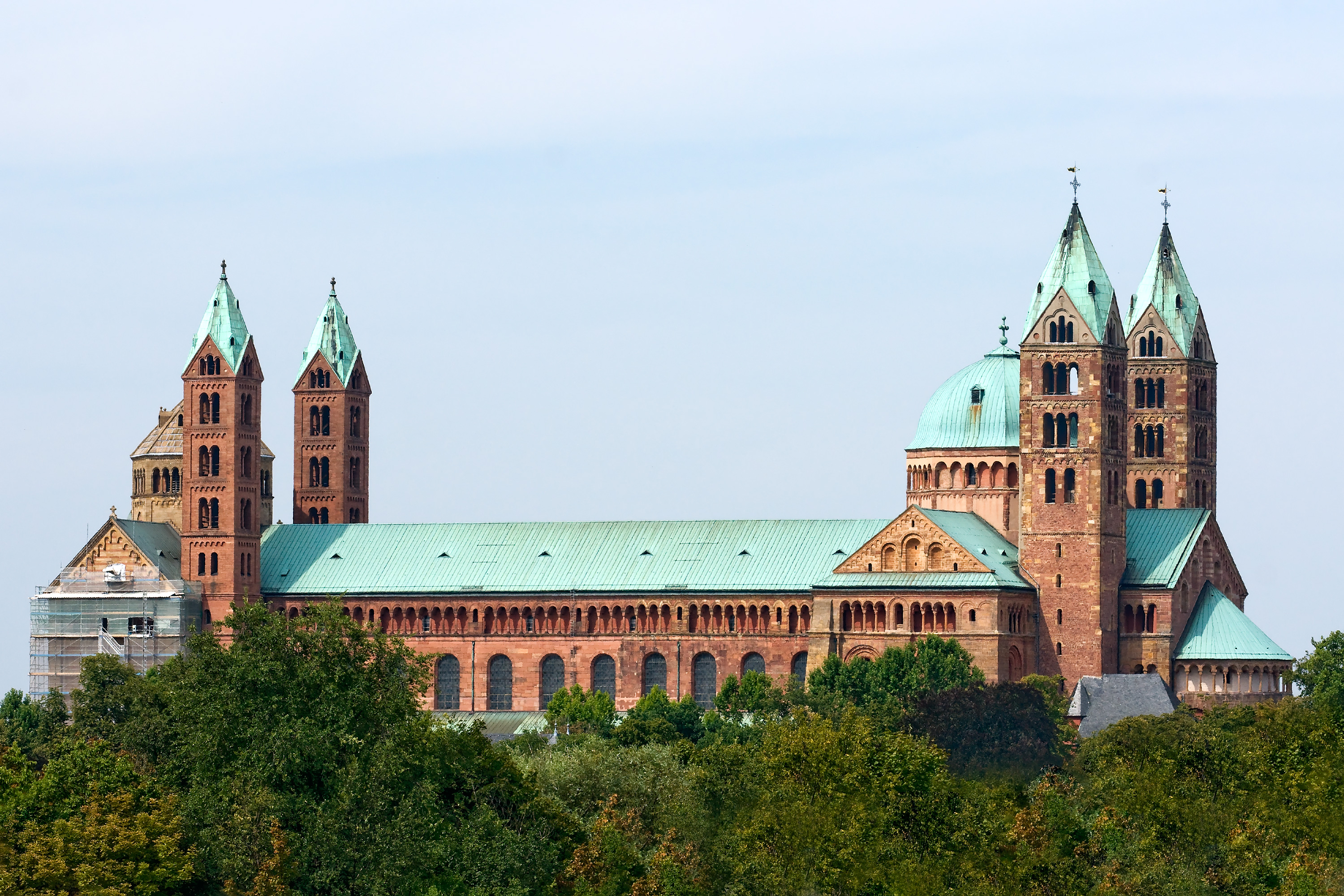
Speyer Cathedral, Germany, begun by Conrad II, Holy Roman Emperor in 1030, as an expression of imperial power and architectural innovation

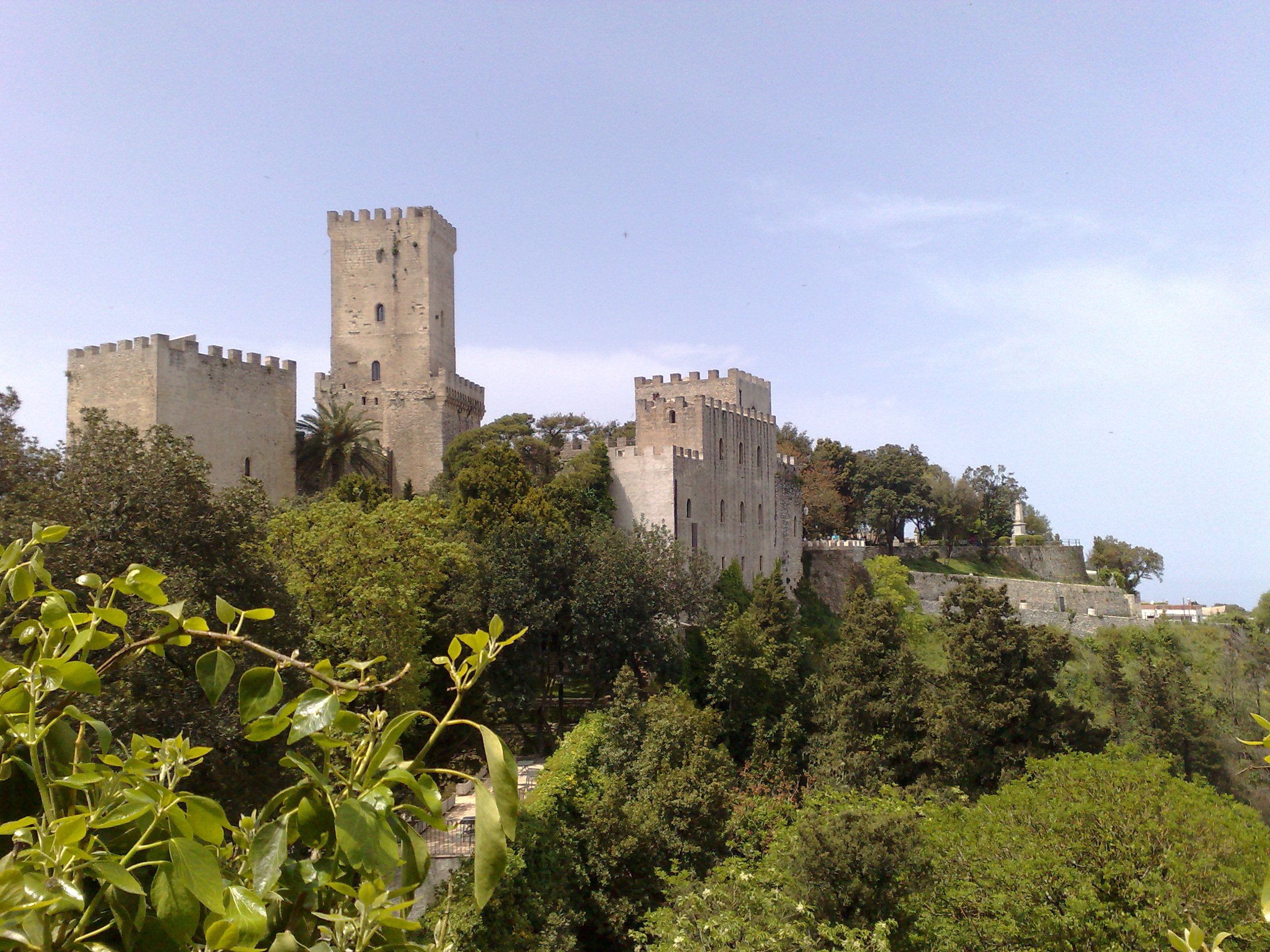
Castello di Venere, Erice (12th–13th century), is one of many built by the Normans in Sicily, Italy.

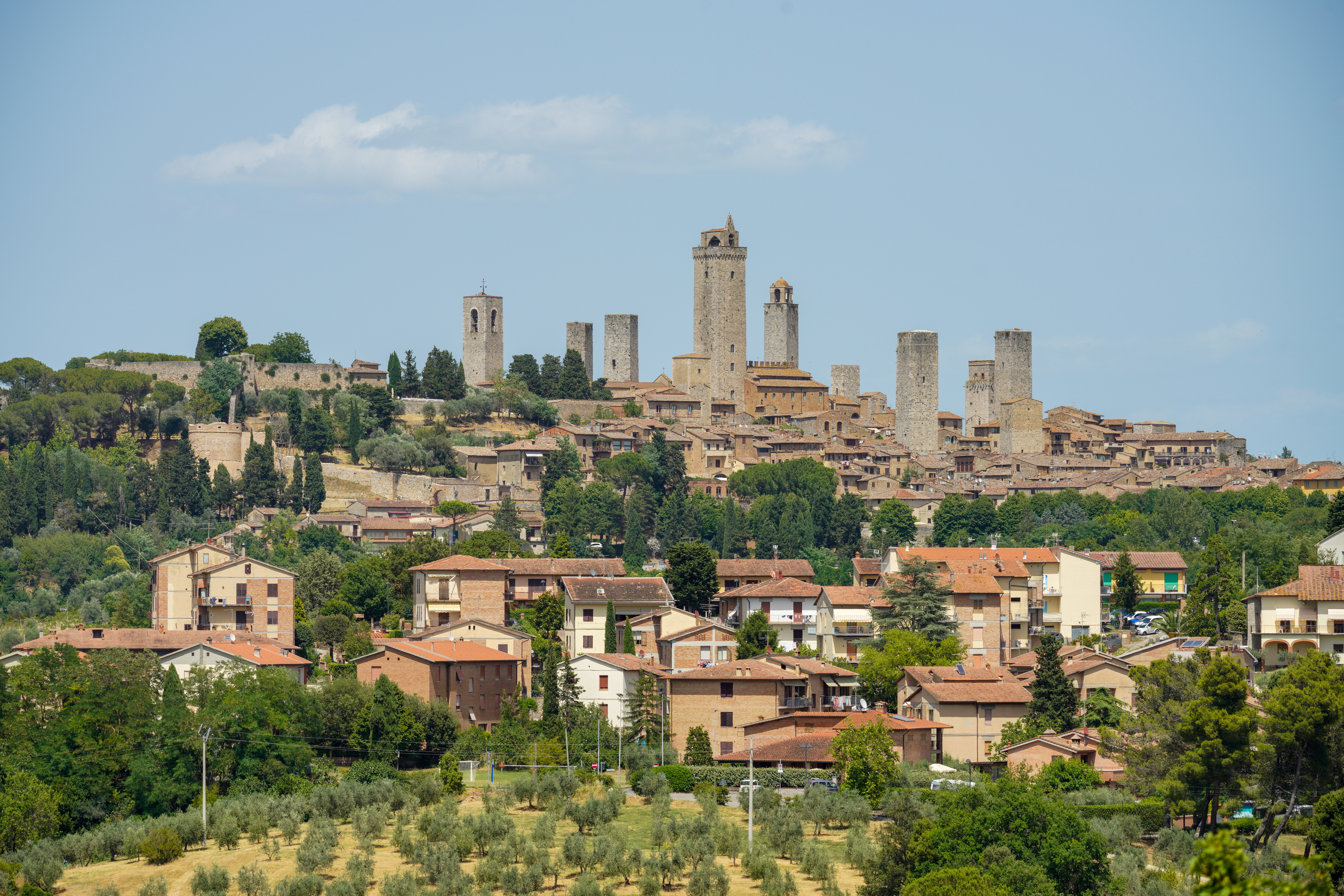
Many towns, such as San Gimignano, were enclosed with walls, causing crowding and the building of tower houses

=== Religion ===
Across Europe, the late 11th and 12th centuries saw an unprecedented growth in the number of churches. A great number of these buildings, both large and small, remain, some almost intact and in others altered almost beyond recognition in later centuries. They include many very well known churches such as Santa Maria in Cosmedin in Rome, the Baptistery in Florence and San Zeno Maggiore in Verona. In France, the famous abbeys of Aux Dames and Les Hommes at Caen and Mont Saint-Michel date from this period, as well as the abbeys of the pilgrimage route to Santiago de Compostela. Many cathedrals owe their foundation to this date, with others beginning as abbey churches, and later becoming cathedrals.

In England, of the cathedrals of ancient foundation, all were begun in this period with the exception of Salisbury, where the monks relocated from the Norman church at Old Sarum, and several, such as Canterbury, which were rebuilt on the site of Saxon churches. In Spain, the most famous church of the period is Santiago de Compostela. In Germany, the Rhine and its tributaries were the location of many Romanesque abbeys, notably Mainz, Worms, Speyer and Bamberg. In Cologne, then the largest city north of the Alps, a very important group of large city churches survived largely intact. As monasticism spread across Europe, Romanesque churches sprang up in Scotland, Scandinavia, Poland, Hungary, Sicily, Serbia and Tunisia. Several important Romanesque churches were built in the Crusader kingdoms.

==== Monasticism ====
The system of monasticism in which the religious become members of an order, with common ties and a common rule, living in a mutually dependent community, rather than as a group of hermits living in proximity but essentially separate, was established by the monk Benedict in the 6th century. The Benedictine monasteries spread from Italy throughout Europe, being always by far the most numerous in England. They were followed by the Cluniac order, the Cistercians, Carthusians and Augustinian Canons. During the Crusades, the military orders of the Knights Hospitaller and the Knights Templar were founded.

The monasteries, which sometimes also functioned as cathedrals, and the cathedrals that had bodies of secular clergy often living in community, were a major source of power in Europe. Bishops and the abbots of important monasteries lived and functioned like princes. The monasteries were the major seats of learning of all sorts. Benedict had ordered that all the arts were to be taught and practiced in the monasteries. Within the monasteries books were transcribed by hand, and few people outside the monasteries could read or write.

In France, Burgundy was the centre of monasticism. The enormous and powerful monastery at Cluny was to have lasting effect on the layout of other monasteries and the design of their churches. Very little of the abbey church at Cluny remains; the "Cluny II" rebuilding of 963 onwards has completely vanished, but we have a good idea of the design of "Cluny III" from 1088 to 1130, which until the Renaissance remained the largest building in Europe. However, the church of St. Sernin at Toulouse, 1080–1120, has remained intact and demonstrates the regularity of Romanesque design with its modular form, its massive appearance and the repetition of the simple arched window motif.

Types of churches

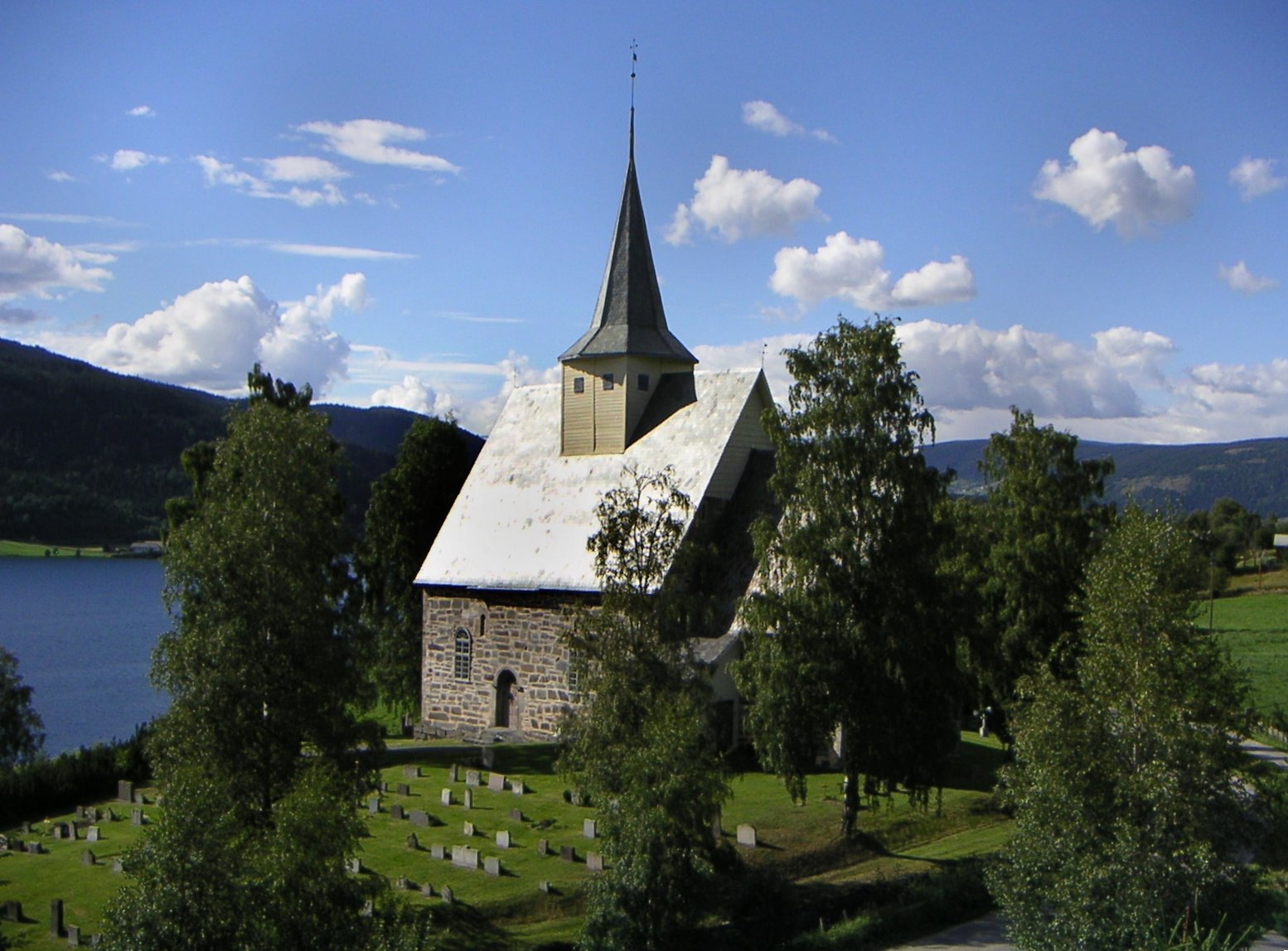
Many parish churches across Europe, such as this in Vestre Slidre Municipality, Norway, are of Romanesque foundation.

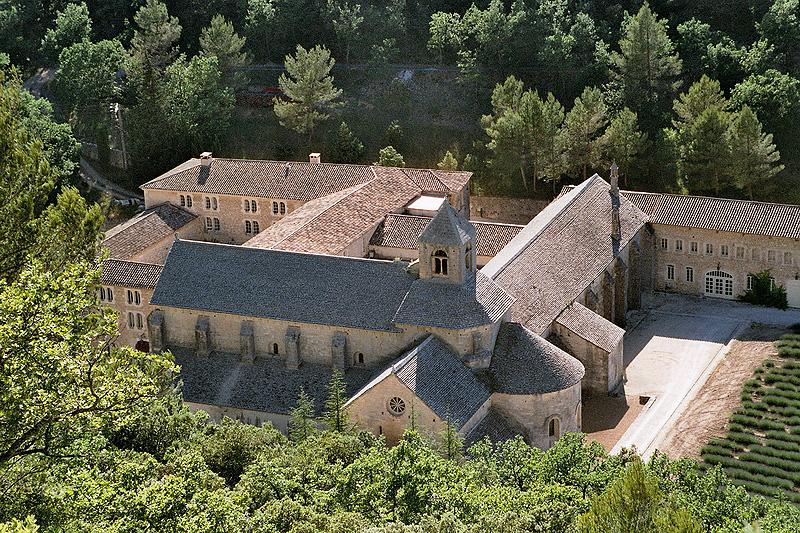
The Romanesque Sénanque Abbey church and surrounding monastic buildings, Gordes, Provence, France

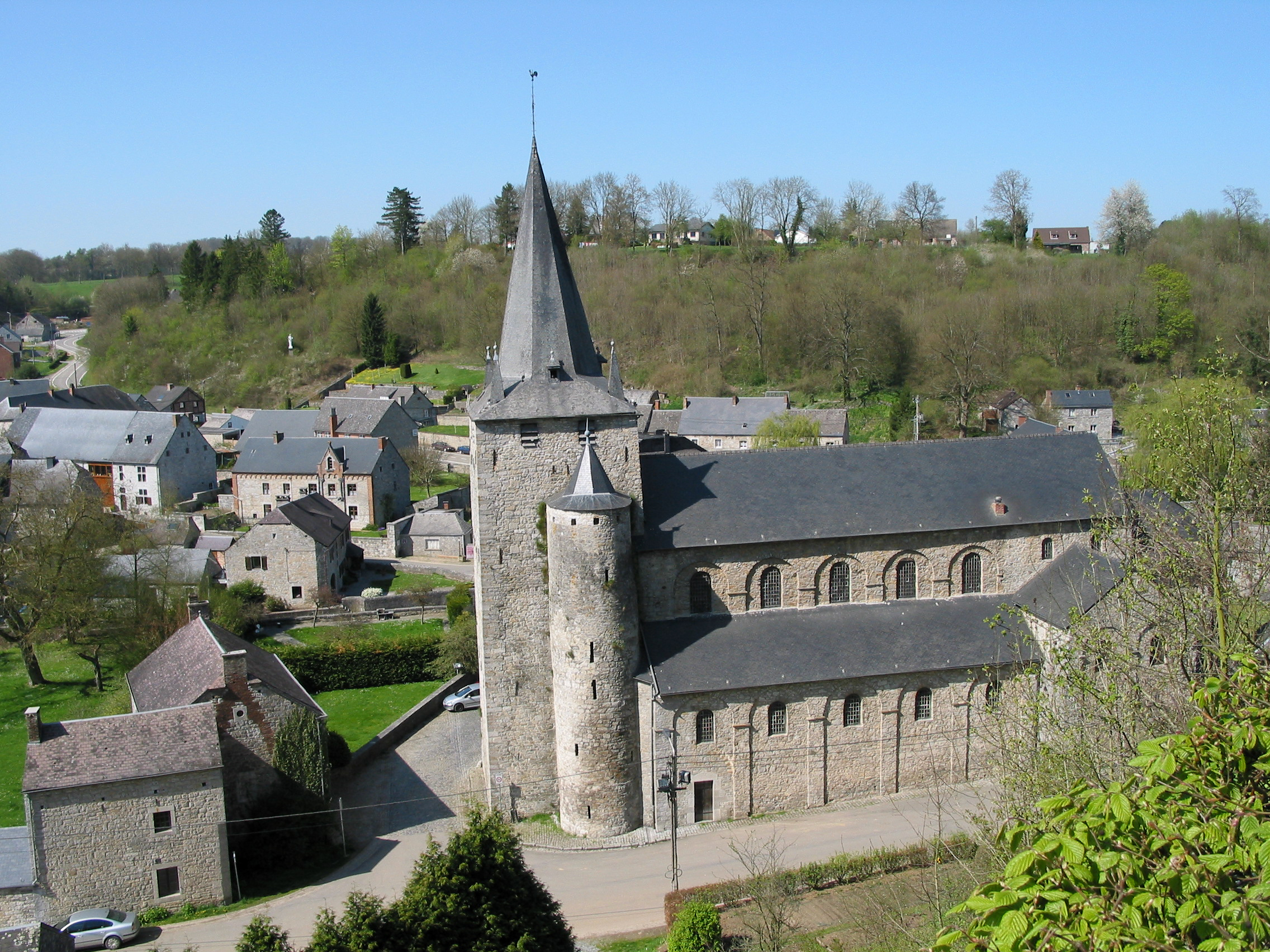
Collegiate churches such as that of Saint Hadelin, Celles, Belgium, were administered by lay canons.

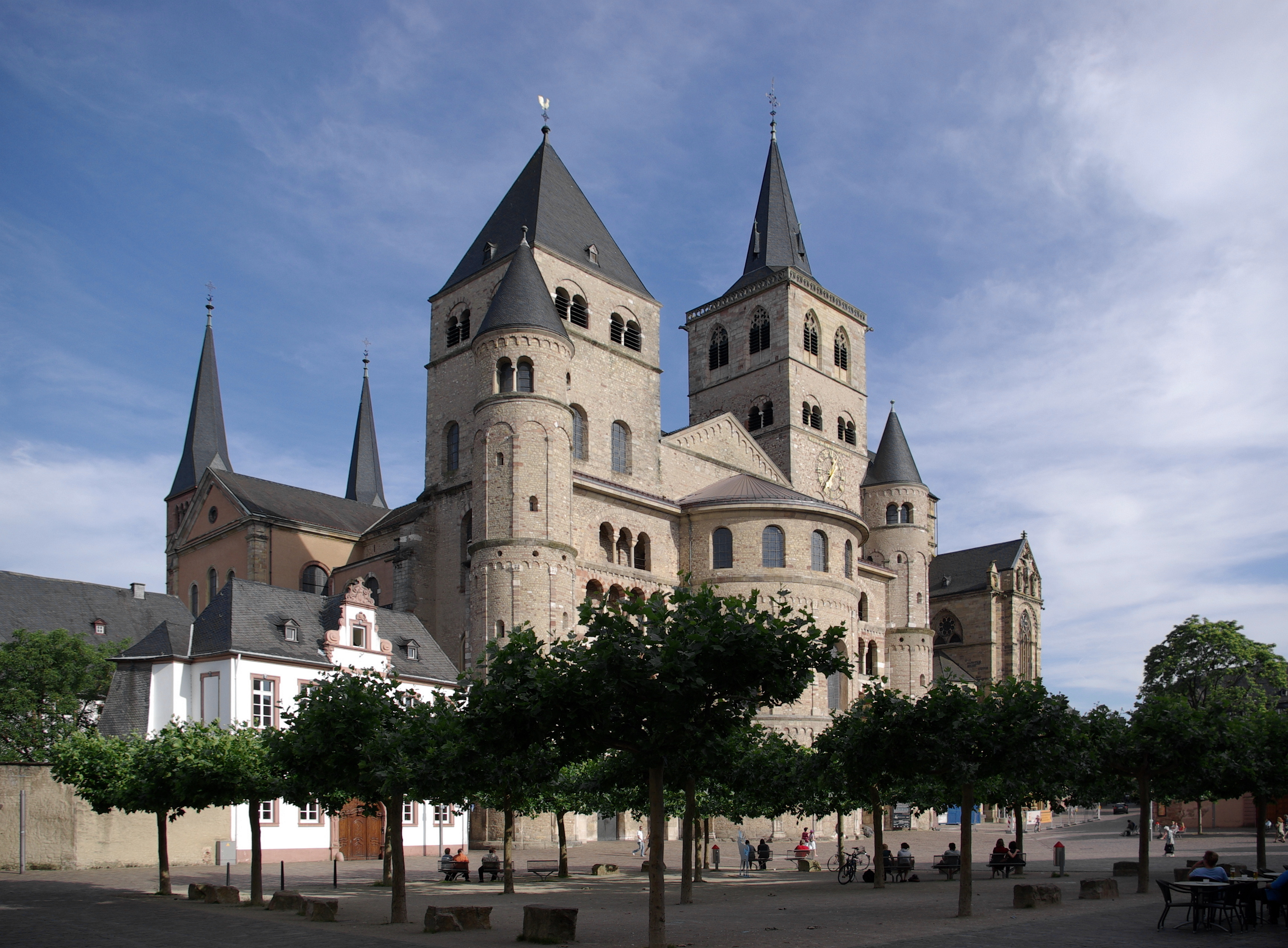
Many cathedrals such as Trier Cathedral, Germany, date from this period, with many later additions.

==== Pilgrimage and Crusade ====
One of the effects of the Crusades, which were intended to wrest the Holy Places of the Levant from Islamic control, was to excite a great deal of religious fervour, which in turn inspired great building programs. The Nobility of Europe, upon safe return, thanked God by the building of a new church or the enhancement of an old one. Likewise, those who did not return from the Crusades could be suitably commemorated by their family in a work of stone and mortar.

The Crusades resulted in the transfer of, among other things, a great number of Holy Relics of saints and apostles. Many churches, like Saint-Front, Périgueux, had their own home grown saint while others, most notably Santiago de Compostela, claimed the remains and the patronage of a powerful saint, in this case one of the Twelve Apostles. Santiago de Compostela, located in the Kingdom of Galicia (present day Galicia, Spain) became one of the most important pilgrimage destinations in Europe. Most of the pilgrims travelled the Way of St. James on foot, many of them barefooted as a sign of penance. They moved along one of the four main routes that passed through France, congregating for the journey at Jumièges, Paris, Vézelay, Cluny, Arles and St. Gall in Switzerland. They crossed two passes in the Pyrenees and converged into a single stream to traverse north-western Spain. Along the route they were urged on by those pilgrims returning from the journey. On each of the routes abbeys such as those at Moissac, Toulouse, Roncesvalles, Conques, Limoges and Burgos catered for the flow of people and grew wealthy from the passing trade. Saint-Benoît-du-Sault, in the Berry province, is typical of the churches that were founded on the pilgrim route.

Pilgrimage and crusade

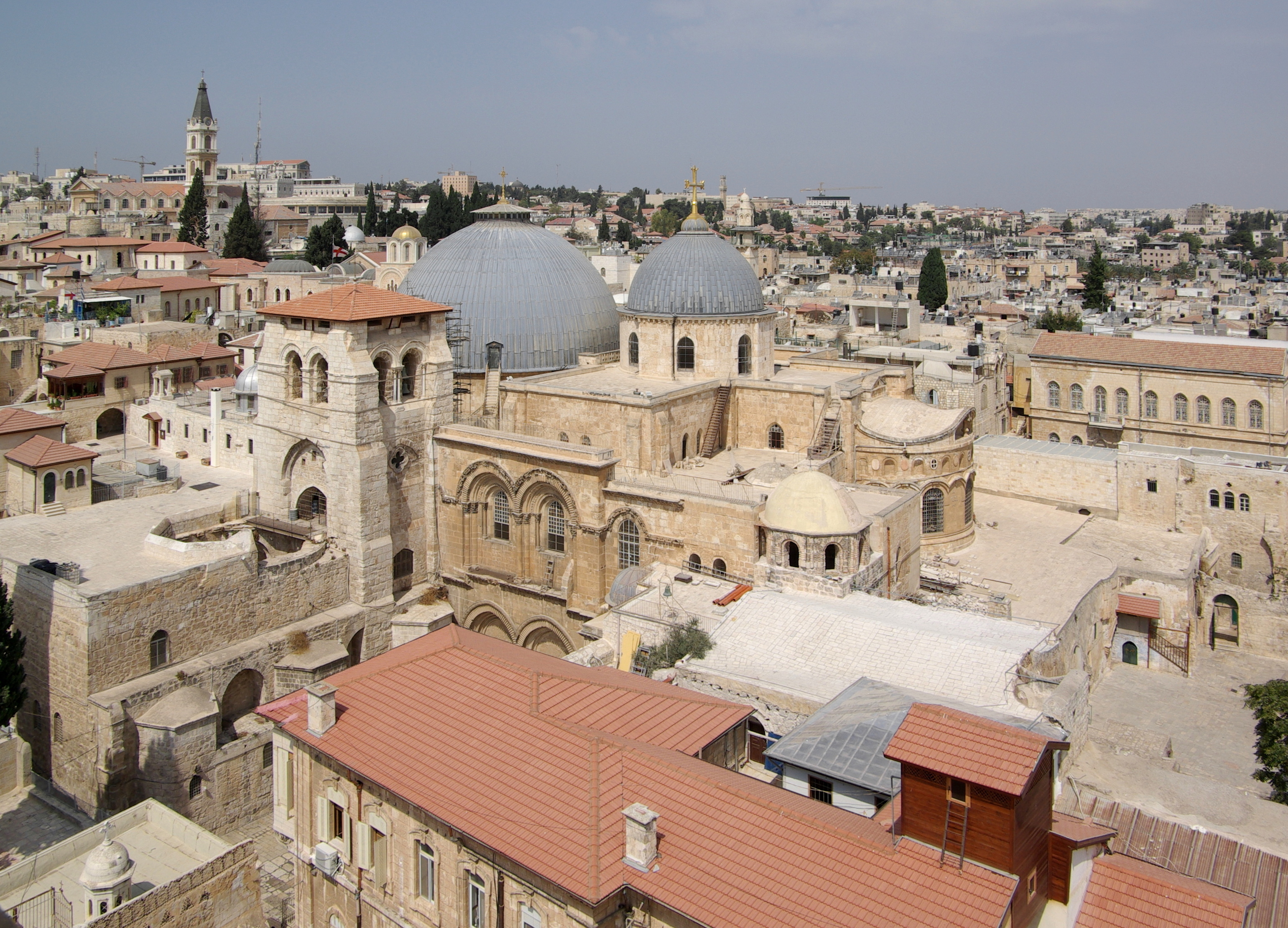
The Church of the Holy Sepulchre, Jerusalem, a major pilgrimage site from the 4th century onwards. Its rotunda inspired the construction of many Romanesque circular churches.

Kerak Castle, Jordan, like many Crusader fortresses, was begun during this period; it was later altered by the Muslims.

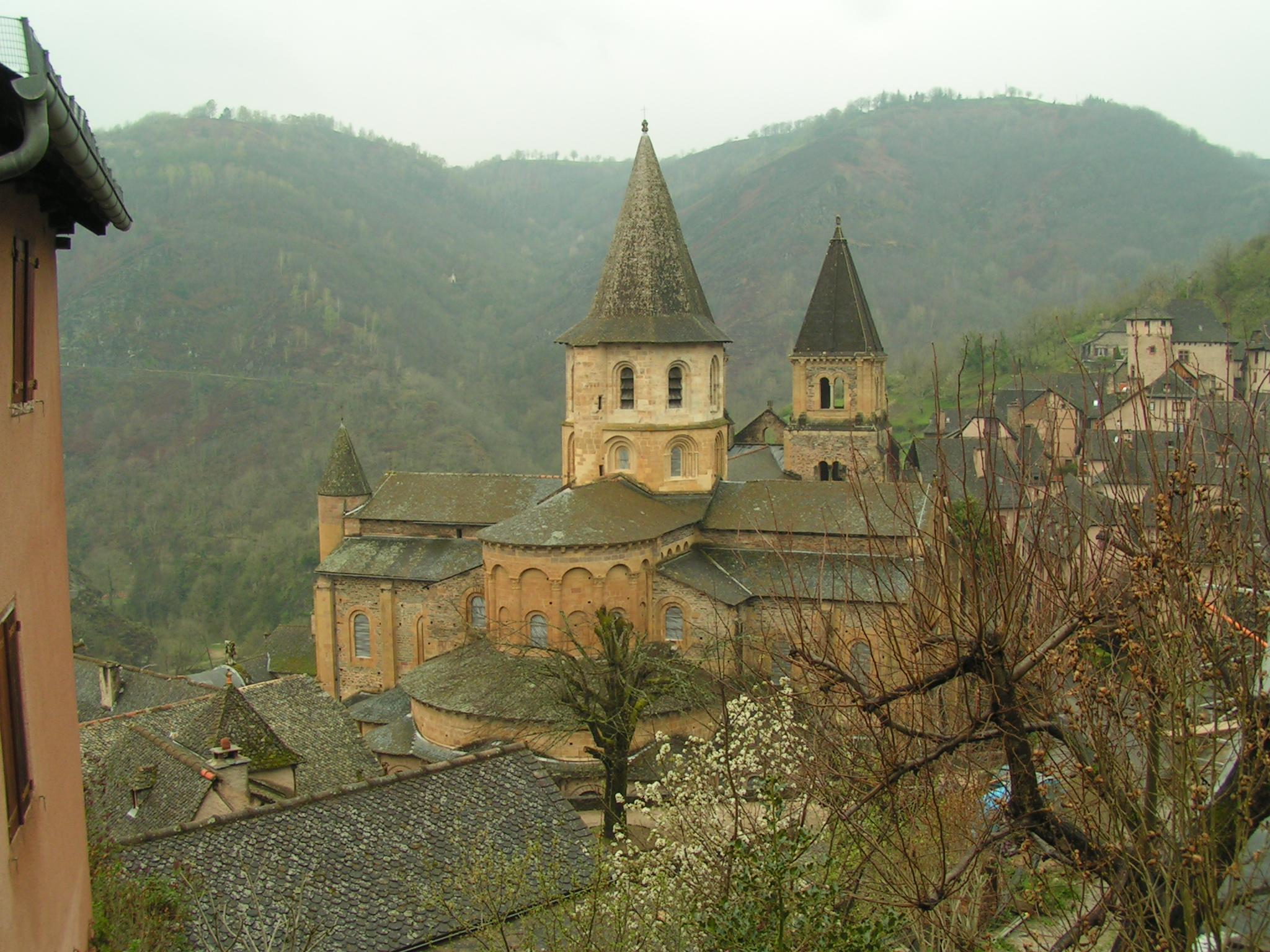
The Abbey of Saint Foy, Conques, France, was one of many such abbeys to be built along the pilgrimage Way of St James that led to Santiago de Compostela.

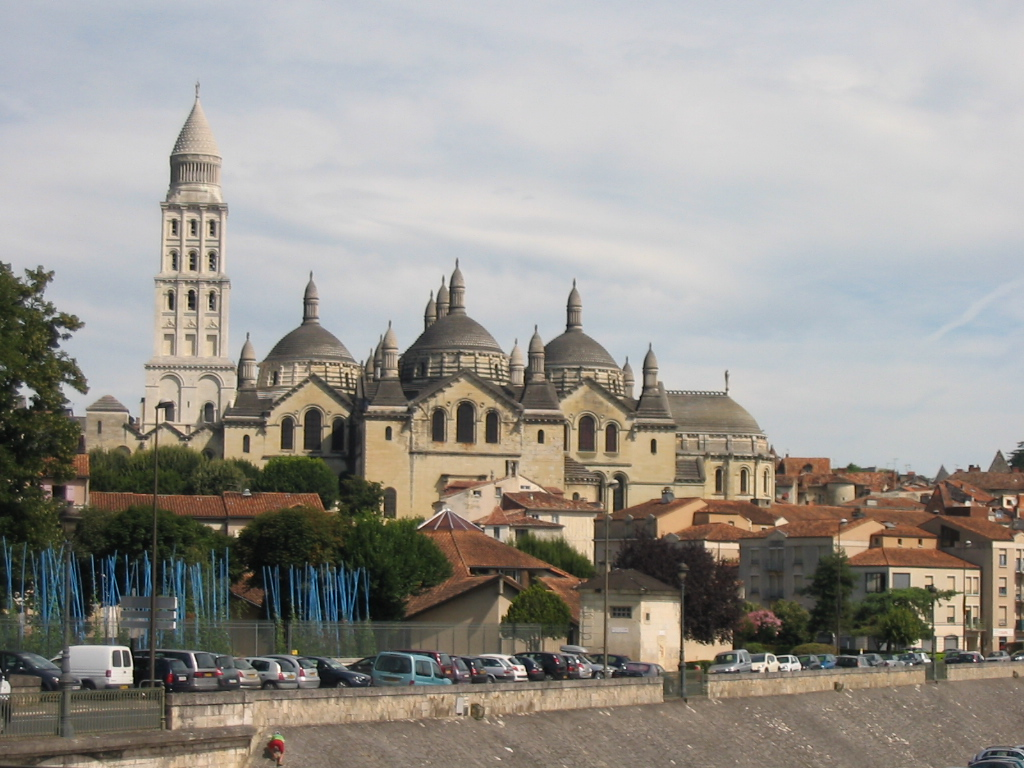
The plan of the Church of Saint Front, Périgueux, France, was influenced by Byzantine architecture seen by the Crusaders. The present appearance is largely due to restorer Paul Abadie, mid-19th century.

The basilica of Saint-Sernin in Toulouse is the archetype of large pilgrimage churches, where pilgrims could walk around the church via the transept and the choir chapels.

== Characteristics ==
The general impression given by Romanesque architecture, in both ecclesiastical and secular buildings, is one of massive solidity and strength. In contrast with both the preceding Roman and later Gothic architecture, in which the load-bearing structural members are, or appear to be, columns, pilasters and arches, Romanesque architecture, in common with Byzantine architecture, relies upon its walls, or sections of walls called piers.

Romanesque architecture is often divided into two periods known as the "First Romanesque" style and the "Romanesque" style. The difference is chiefly a matter of the expertise with which the buildings were constructed. The First Romanesque employed rubble walls, smaller windows and unvaulted roofs. A greater refinement marks the Second Romanesque, along with increased use of the vault and dressed stone.

=== Walls ===
The walls of Romanesque buildings are often of massive thickness with few and comparatively small openings. They are often double shells, filled with rubble.

The building material differs greatly across Europe, depending upon the local stone and building traditions. In Italy, Poland, much of Germany and parts of the Netherlands, brick is generally used. Other areas saw extensive use of limestone, granite and flint. The building stone was often used in comparatively small and irregular pieces, bedded in thick mortar. Smooth ashlar masonry was not a distinguishing feature of the style (especially not in the earlier part of the period), but it did occur, chiefly where easily worked limestone was available.

=== Buttresses ===
Because of the massive nature of Romanesque walls, buttresses are not a highly significant feature, as they are in Gothic architecture. Romanesque buttresses are generally of flat square profile and do not project a great deal beyond the wall. In the case of aisled churches, barrel vaults, or half-barrel vaults over the aisles helped to buttress the nave, if it was vaulted.

In the cases where half-barrel vaults were used, they effectively became like flying buttresses. Often aisles extended through two storeys, rather than the one usual in Gothic architecture, so as to better support the weight of a vaulted nave. In the case of Durham Cathedral, flying buttresses have been employed, but are hidden inside the triforium gallery.

Walls and buttresses

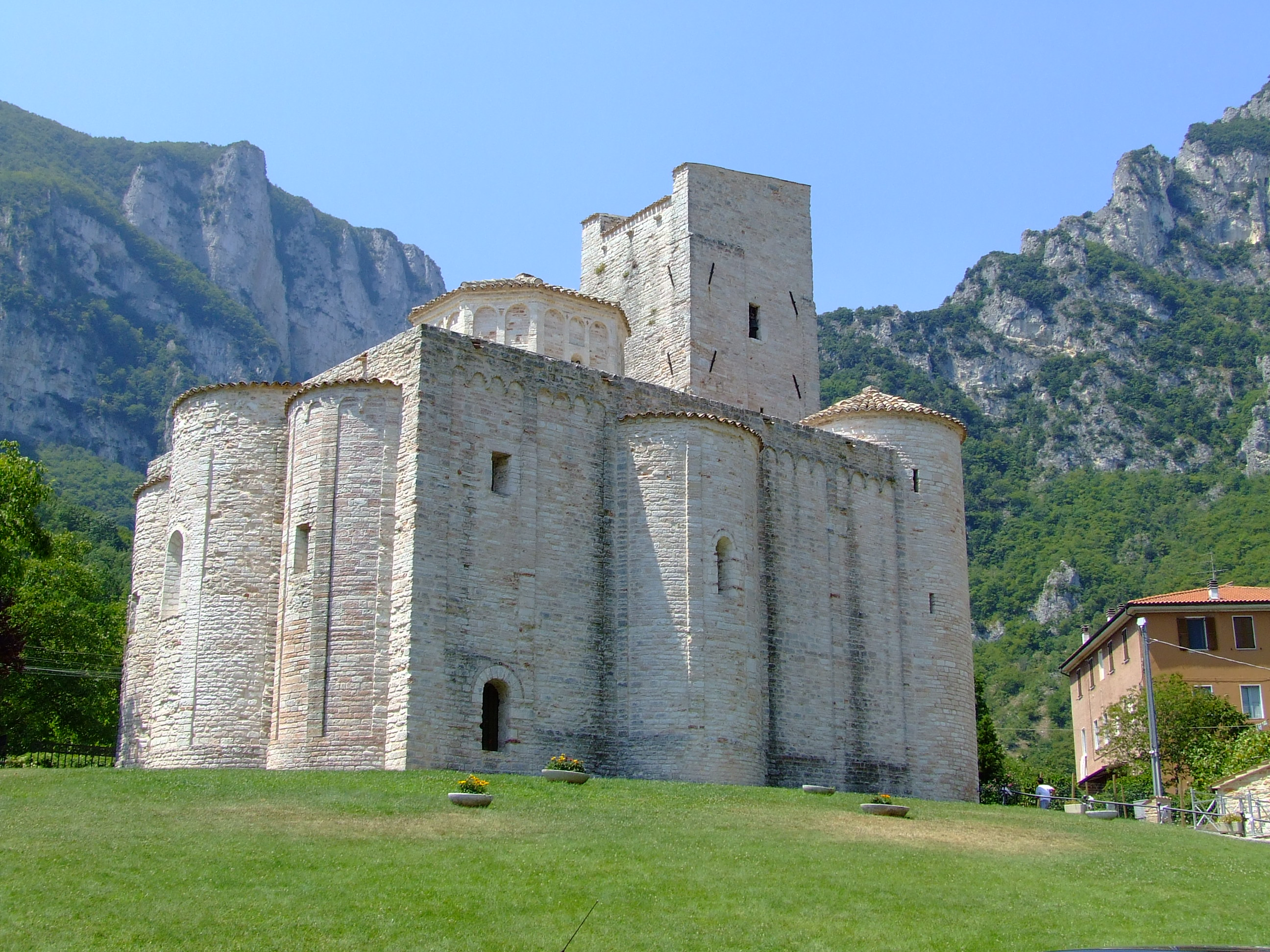
The monastery of San Vittore alle Chiuse, Genga, Italy, of undressed stone, has a typically fortress-like appearance with small windows of early Romanesque.

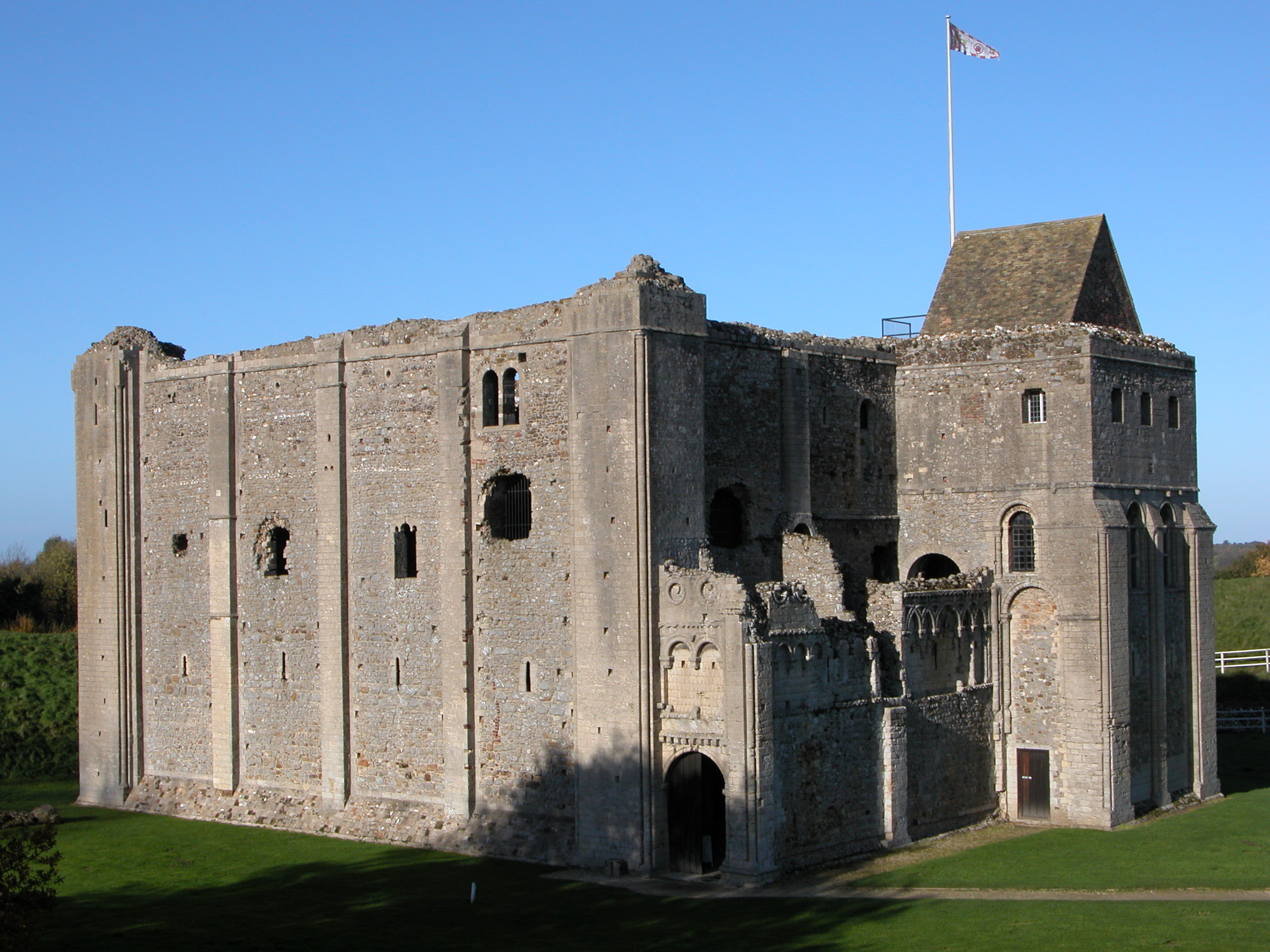
Castle Rising Castle, England, shows flat buttresses and reinforcing at the corners of the building typical in both castles and churches.

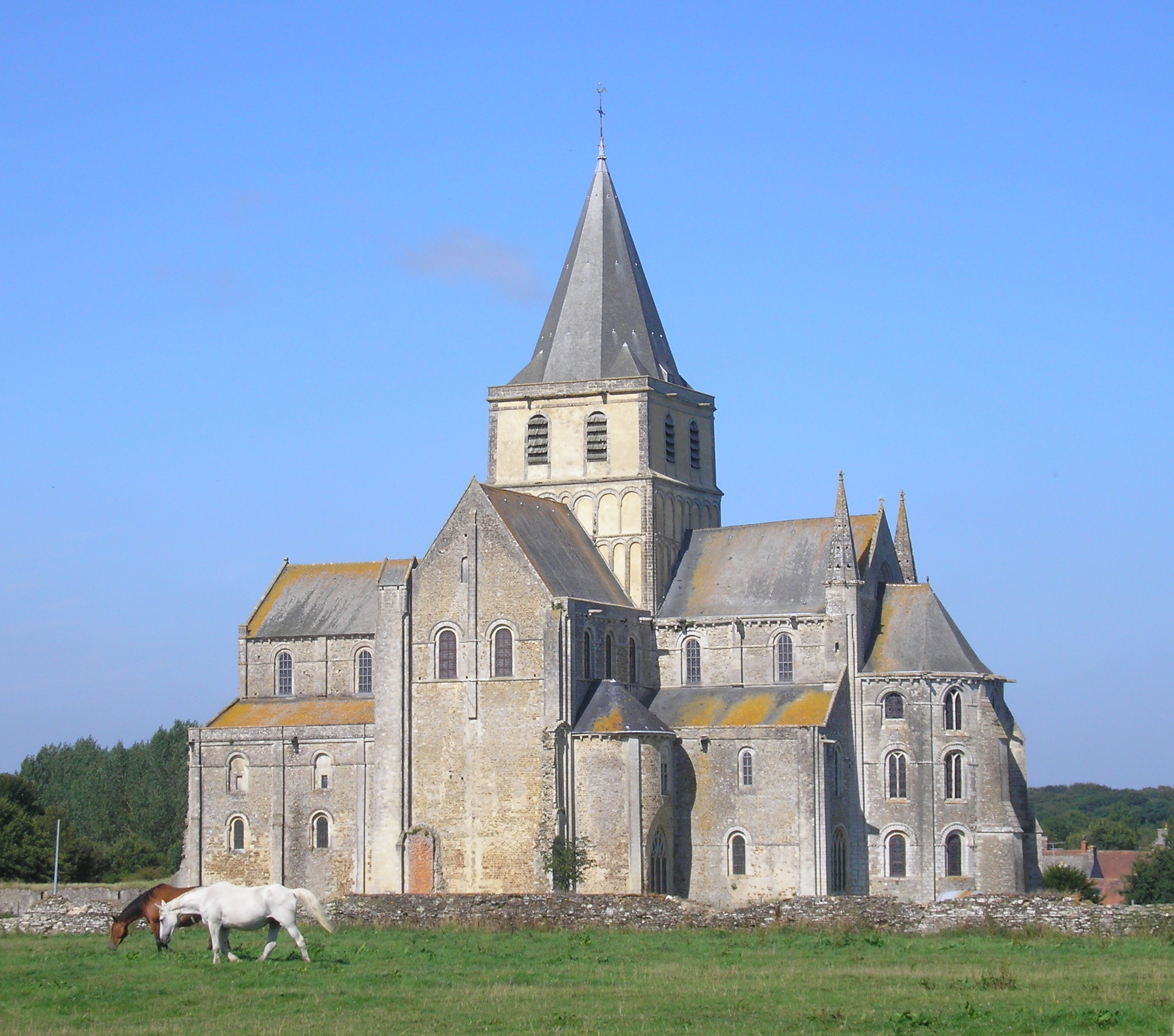
Cerisy Abbey, Normandy, France, has a compact appearance with aisles rising through two storeys buttressing the vault.

St Albans Cathedral England, demonstrates the typical alterations made to the fabric of many Romanesque buildings in different styles and materials

=== Arches and openings ===
The arches used in Romanesque architecture are nearly always semicircular, for openings such as doors and windows, for vaults and for arcades. Wide doorways are usually surmounted by a semi-circular arch, except where a door with a lintel is set into a large arched recess and surmounted by a semi-circular "lunette" with decorative carving. These doors sometimes have a carved central jamb.

Narrow doors and small windows might be surmounted by a solid stone lintel. Larger openings are nearly always arched. A characteristic feature of Romanesque architecture, both ecclesiastic and domestic, is the pairing of two arched windows or arcade openings, separated by a pillar or colonette and often set within a larger arch. Ocular windows are common in Italy, particularly in the façade gable and are also seen in Germany. Later Romanesque churches may have wheel windows or rose windows with plate tracery.

There are a very small number of buildings in the Romanesque style, such as Autun Cathedral in France and Monreale Cathedral in Sicily in which pointed arches have been used extensively, apparently for stylistic reasons. It is believed that in these cases there is a direct imitation of Islamic architecture. At other late Romanesque churches such as Durham Cathedral, and Cefalù Cathedral, the pointed arch was introduced as a structural device in ribbed vaulting. Its increasing application was fundamental to the development of Gothic architecture.

=== Arcades ===
An arcade is a row of arches, supported on piers or columns. They occur in the interior of large churches, separating the nave from the aisles, and in large secular interiors spaces, such as the great hall of a castle, supporting the timbers of a roof or upper floor. Arcades also occur in cloisters and atriums, enclosing an open space.

Arcades can occur in storeys or stages. While the arcade of a cloister is typically of a single stage, the arcade that divides the nave and aisles in a church is typically of two stages, with a third stage of window openings known as the clerestory rising above them. Arcading on a large scale generally fulfils a structural purpose, but it is also used, generally on a smaller scale, as a decorative feature, both internally and externally where it is frequently "blind arcading" with only a wall or a narrow passage behind it.

Openings and arcades

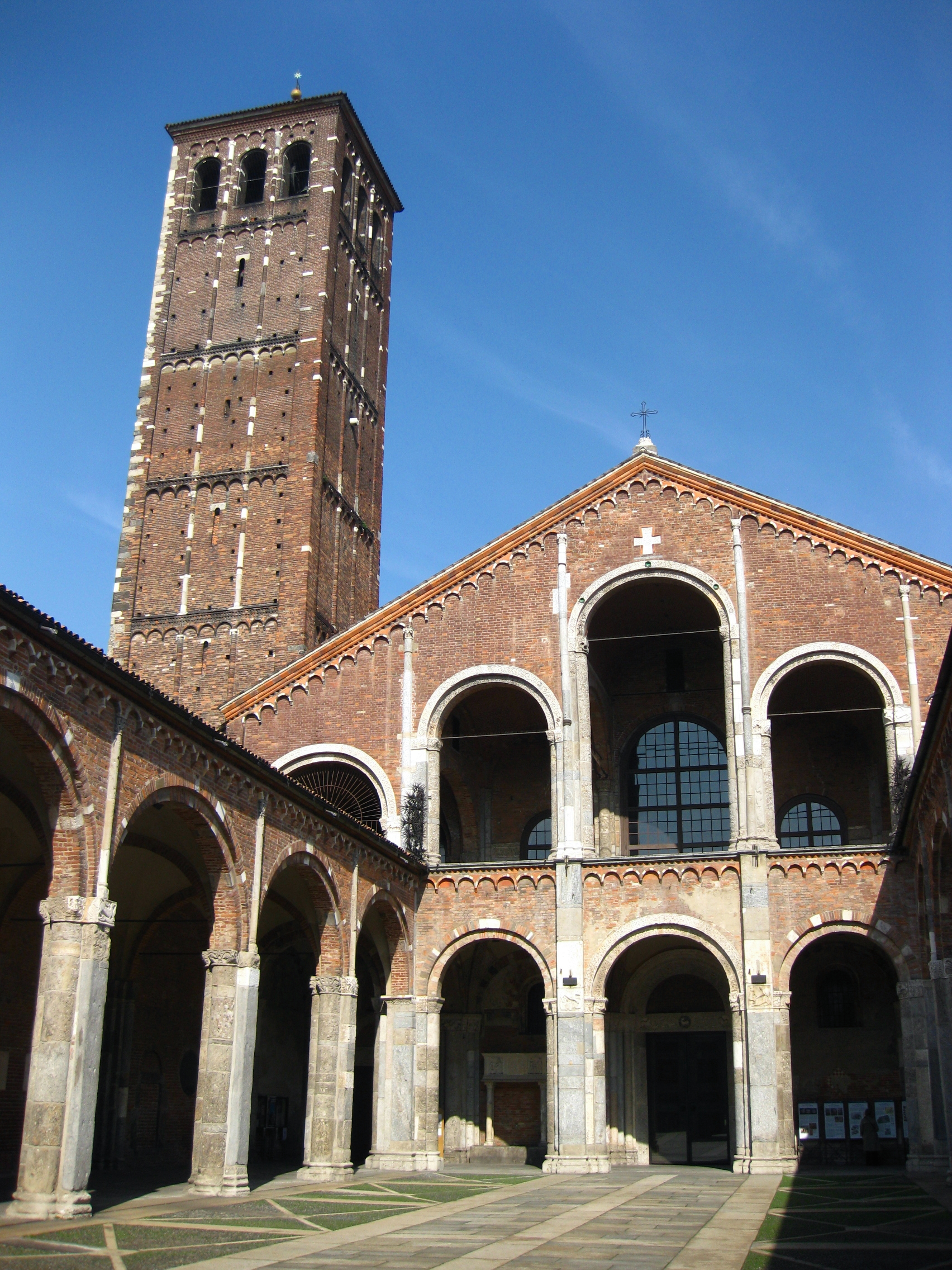
The atrium and arcaded narthex of Sant'Ambrogio, Milan, Italy, is a harmonious composition of similar arches.

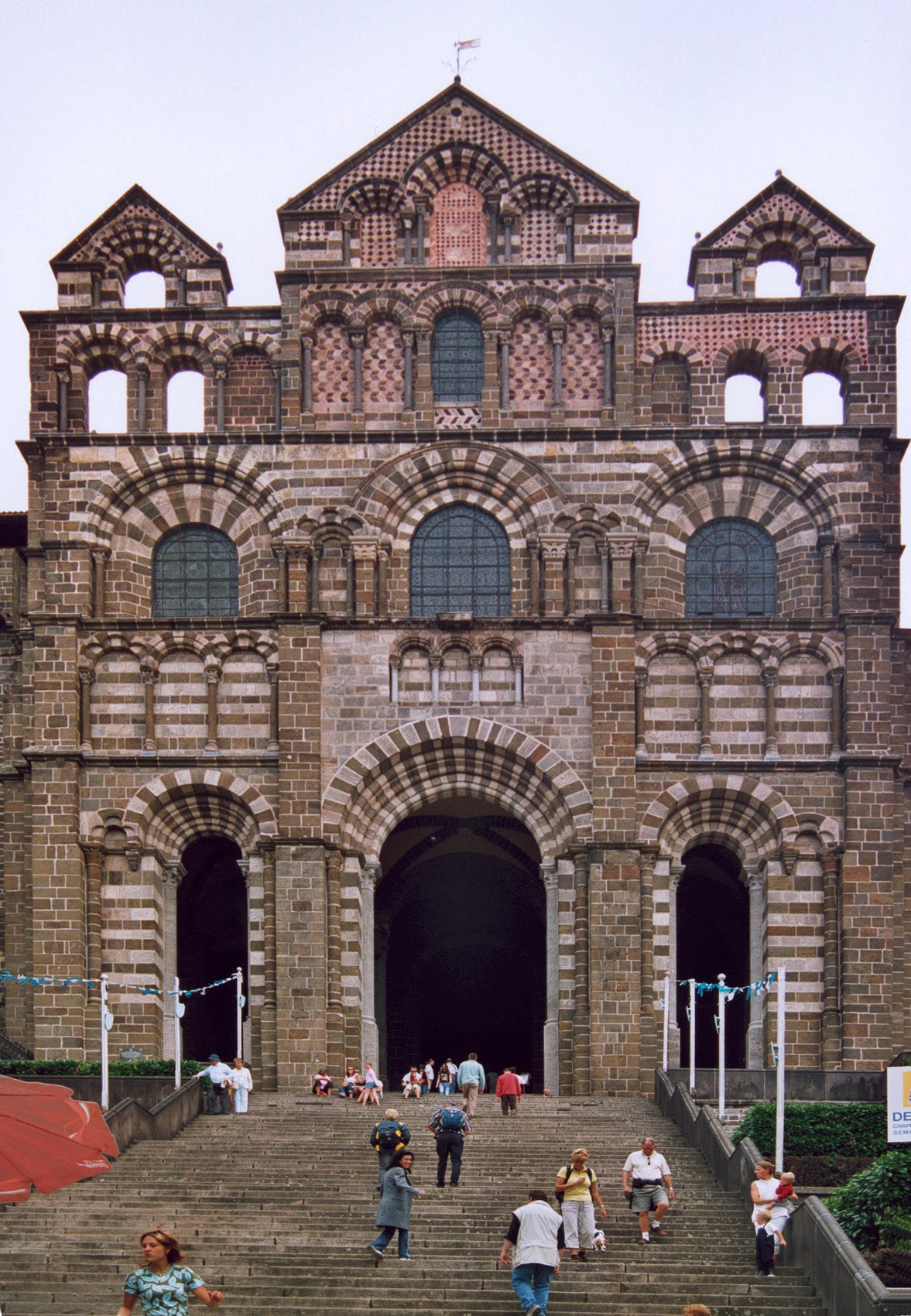
The façade of Notre Dame du Puy, le Puy en Velay, France, has a more complex arrangement of diversified arches: Doors of varying widths, blind arcading, windows and open arcades.

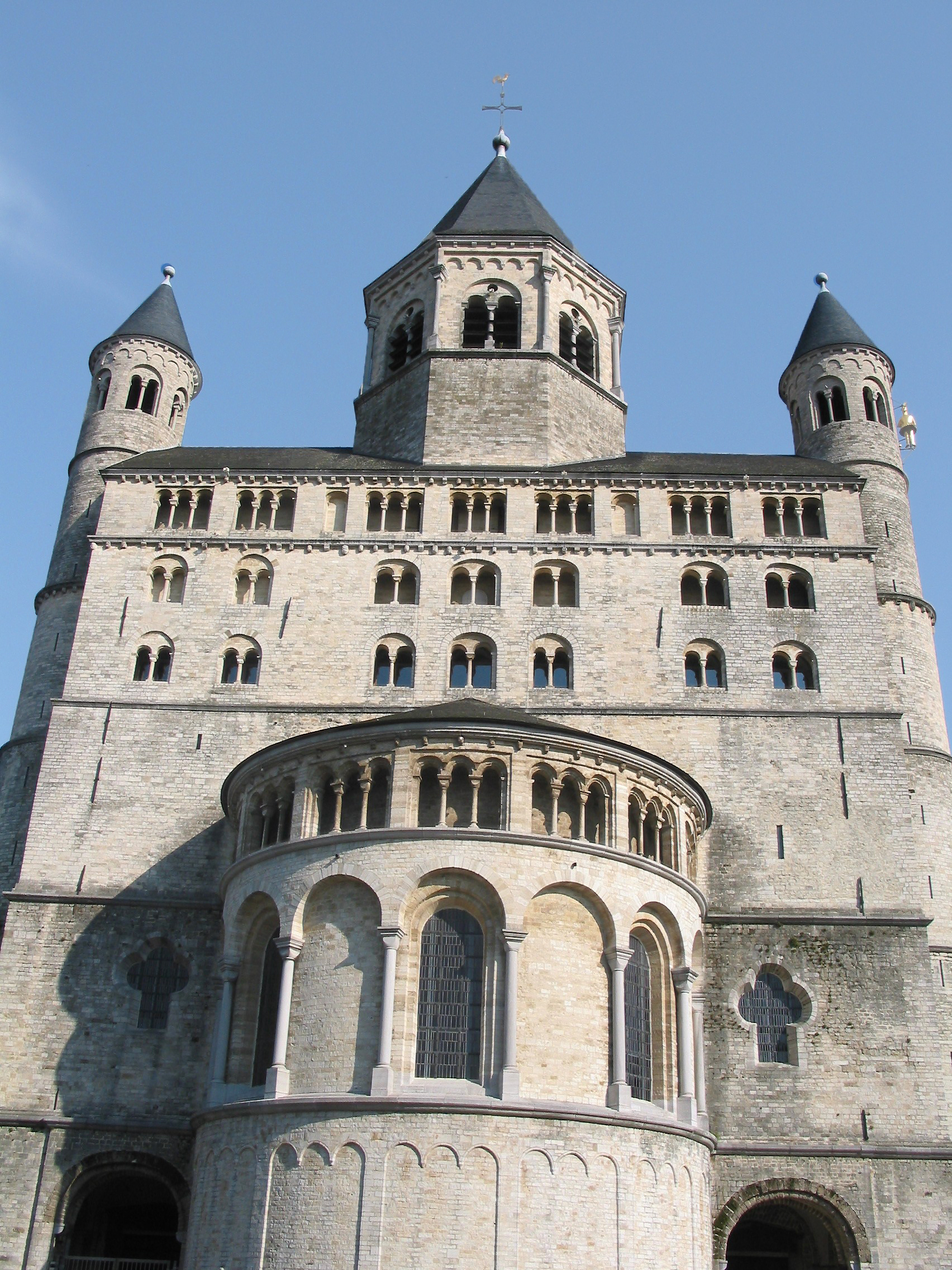
Collegiate Church of Saint Gertrude, Nivelles, Belgium, uses fine shafts of Belgian marble to define alternating blind openings and windows. Upper windows are similarly separated into two openings by colonettes.

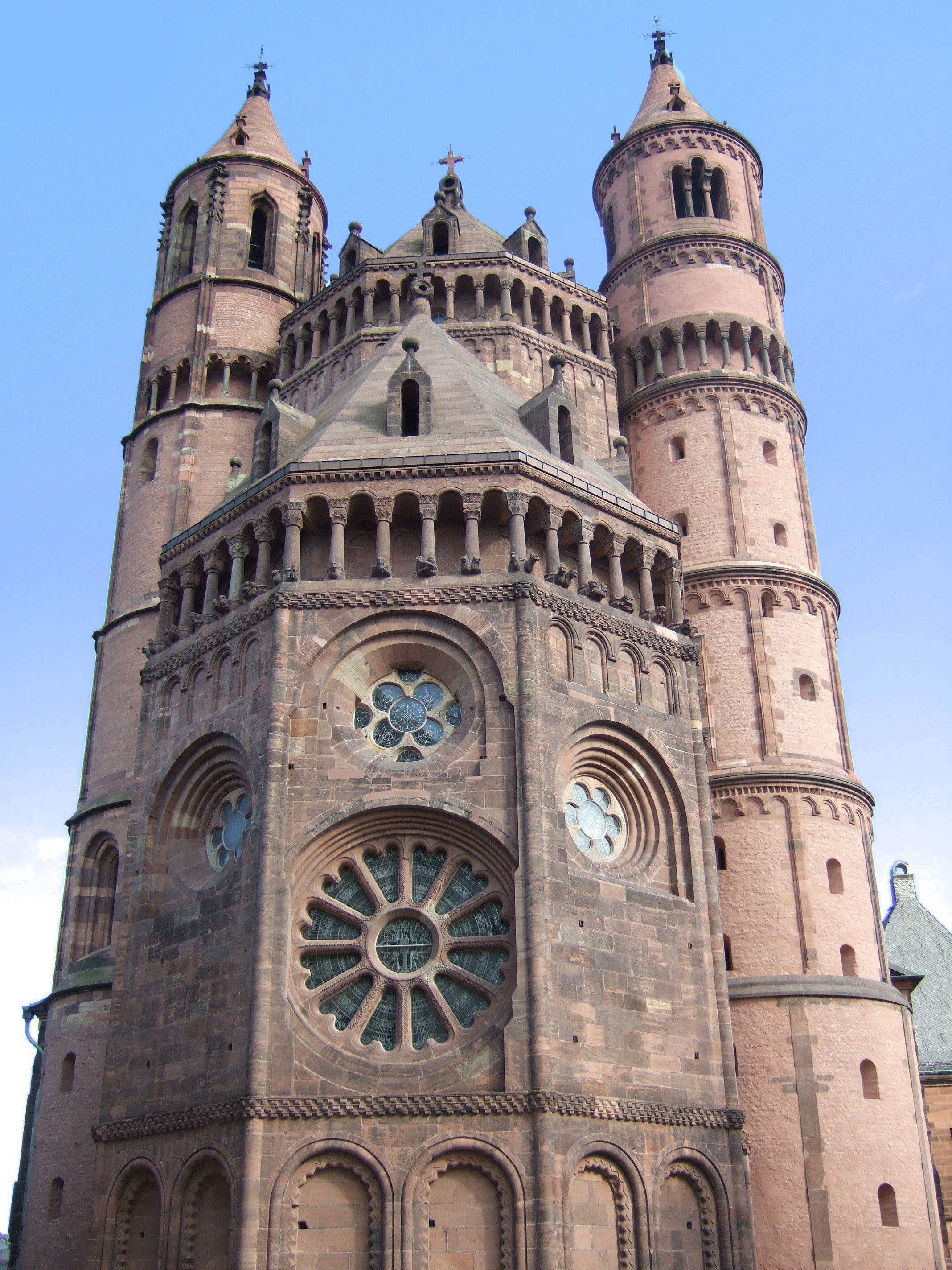
Worms Cathedral, Germany, displays a great variety of openings and arcades including wheel and rose windows, many small simple windows, galleries and Lombard courses.

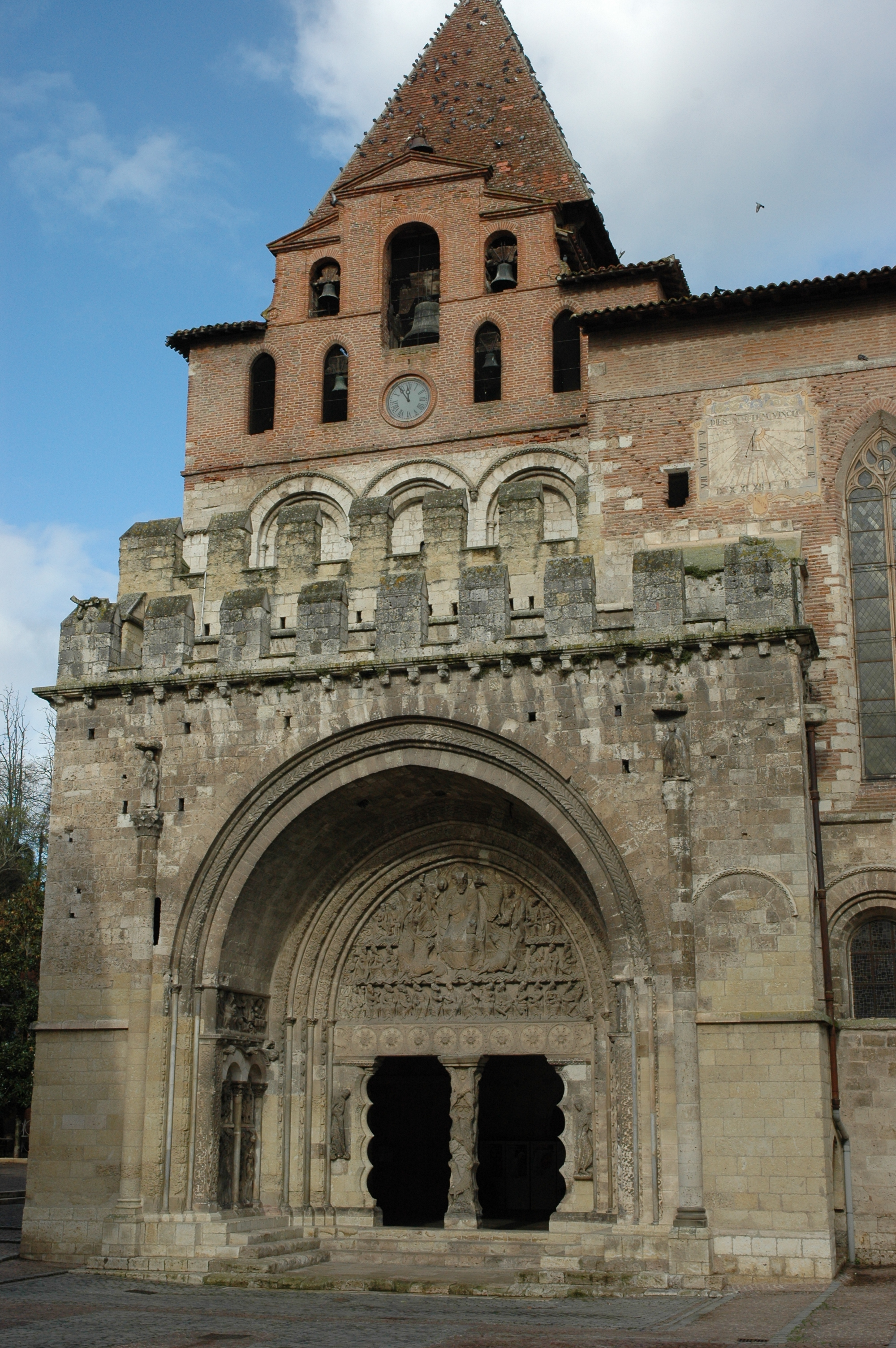
The south portal of the Abbey of Saint-Pierre, Moissac, France, has a square door divided by an ornate doorpost, surmounted by a carved tympanum and set within a vast arched porch.

=== Piers ===
In Romanesque architecture, piers were often employed to support arches. They were built of masonry and square or rectangular in section, generally having a horizontal moulding representing a capital at the springing of the arch. Sometimes piers have vertical shafts attached to them, and may also have horizontal mouldings at the level of the base.

Although basically rectangular, piers can often be of highly complex form, with half-segments of large hollow-core columns on the inner surface supporting the arch, or a clustered group of smaller shafts leading into the mouldings of the arch.

Piers that occur at the intersection of two large arches, such as those under the crossing of the nave and transept, are commonly cruciform in shape, each arch having its own supporting rectangular pier at right angles to the other.

=== Columns ===
Columns are an important structural feature of Romanesque architecture. Colonnettes and attached shafts are also used structurally and for decoration. Monolithic columns cut from a single piece of stone were frequently used in Italy, as they had been in Roman and Early Christian architecture. They were also used, particularly in Germany, when they alternated between more massive piers. Arcades of columns cut from single pieces are also common in structures that do not bear massive weights of masonry, such as cloisters, where they are sometimes paired.

==== Salvaged columns ====
In Italy, during this period, a great number of antique Roman columns were salvaged and reused in the interiors and on the porticos of churches. The most durable of these columns are of marble and have the stone horizontally bedded. The majority are vertically bedded and are sometimes of a variety of colours. They may have retained their original Roman capitals, generally of the Corinthian or Roman Composite style. Some buildings, like Santa Maria in Cosmedin (illustrated above) and the atrium at San Clemente in Rome, may have an odd assortment of columns in which large capitals are placed on short columns and small capitals are placed on taller columns to even the height. Architectural compromises of this type are seen where materials have been salvaged from a number of buildings. Salvaged columns were also used to a lesser extent in France.

==== Drum columns ====
In most parts of Europe, Romanesque columns were massive, as they supported thick upper walls with small windows, and sometimes heavy vaults. The most common method of construction was to build them out of stone cylinders called drums, as in the crypt at Speyer Cathedral.

==== Hollow core columns ====
Where really massive columns were called for, such as those at Durham Cathedral, they were constructed of ashlar masonry and the hollow core was filled with rubble. These huge untapered columns are sometimes ornamented with incised decorations.

==== Alternating supports ====
A common characteristic of Romanesque buildings, occurring both in churches and in the arcades that separate large interior spaces of castles, is the alternation of piers and columns.

The most simple form that this takes is to have a column between each adjoining pier. Sometimes the columns are in multiples of two or three. At St. Michael's, Hildesheim, an A B B A alternation occurs in the nave while an A B A alternation can be seen in the transepts.

At Jumièges there are tall drum columns between piers each of which has a half-column supporting the arch. There are many variations on this theme, most notably at Durham Cathedral where the mouldings and shafts of the piers are of exceptional richness and the huge masonry columns are deeply incised with geometric patterns.

Often the arrangement was made more complex by the complexity of the piers themselves, so that it was not piers and columns that alternated, but rather, piers of entirely different form from each other, such as those of Sant' Ambrogio, Milan, where the nature of the vault dictated that the alternate piers bore a great deal more weight than the intermediate ones and are thus very much larger.

Piers and columns

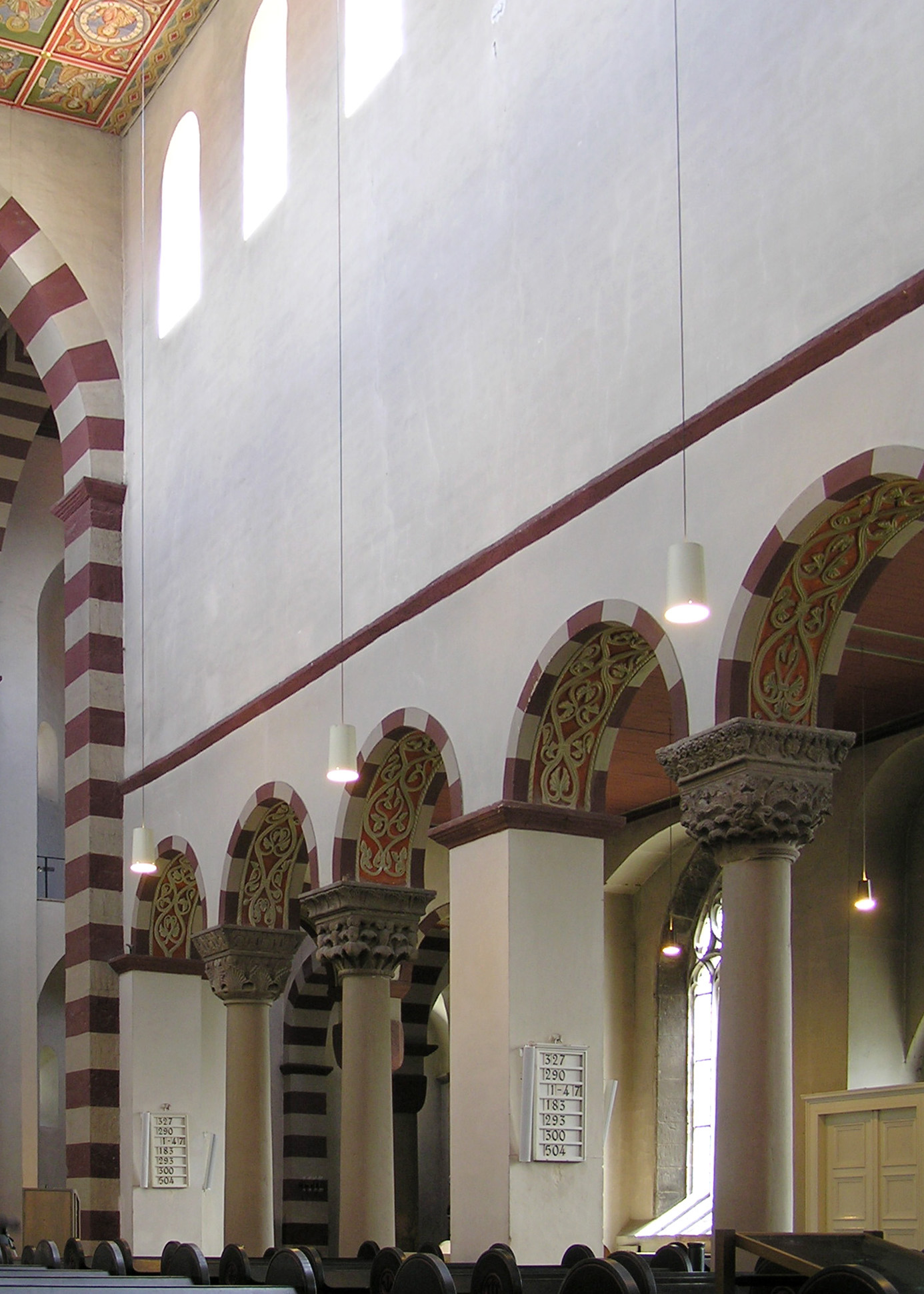
St Michael's, Hildesheim, shows two columns set between the piers.

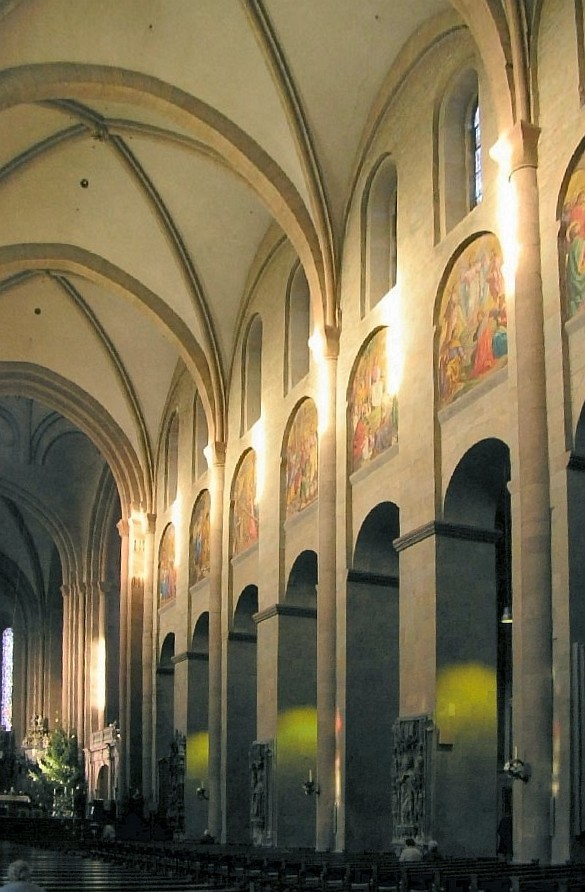
Mainz Cathedral, Germany, has rectangular piers and possibly the earliest example of an internal elevation of three stages. (Gothic vault)

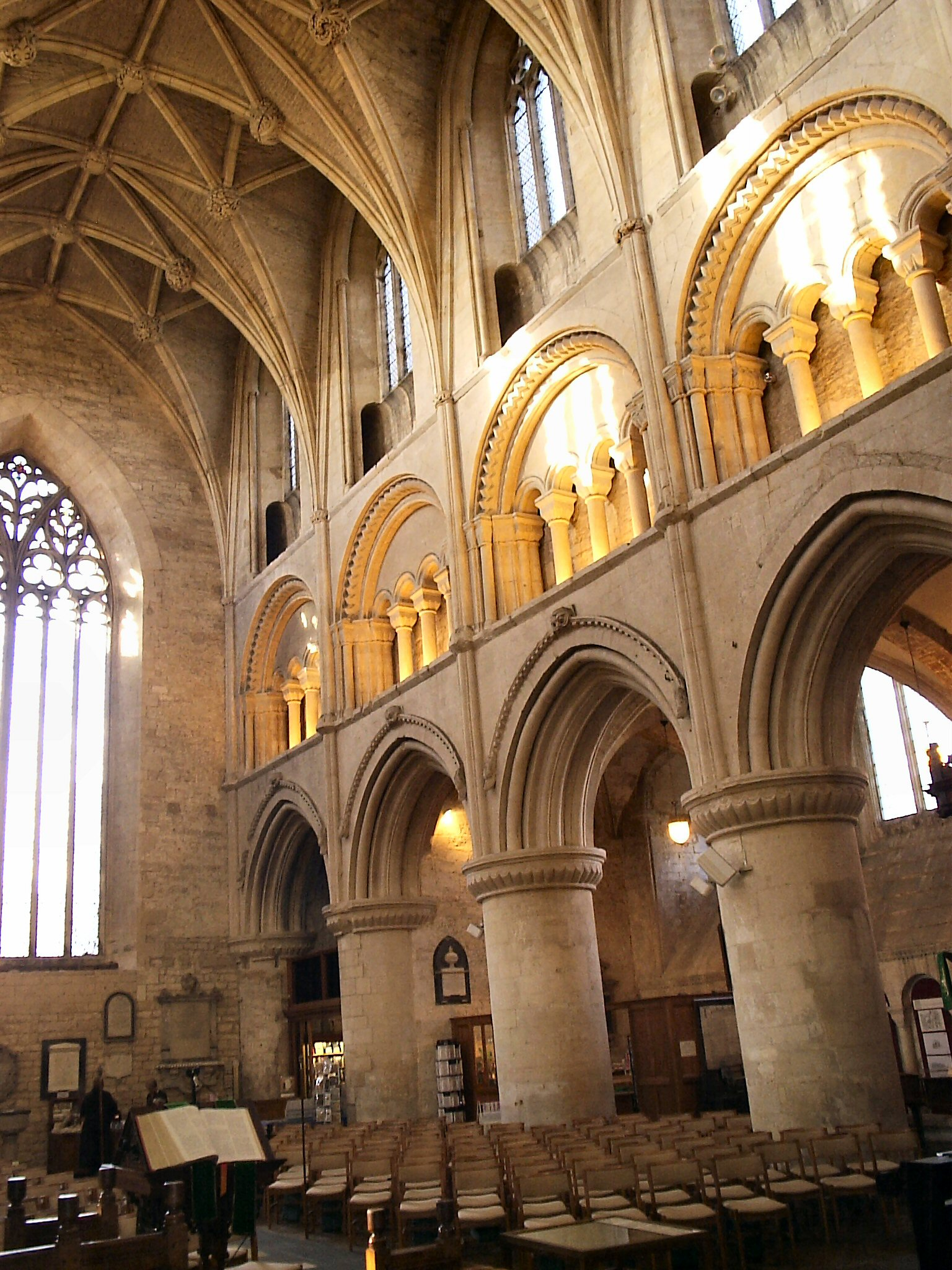
Malmesbury Abbey, England, has hollow core columns, probably filled with rubble. (Gothic vault)

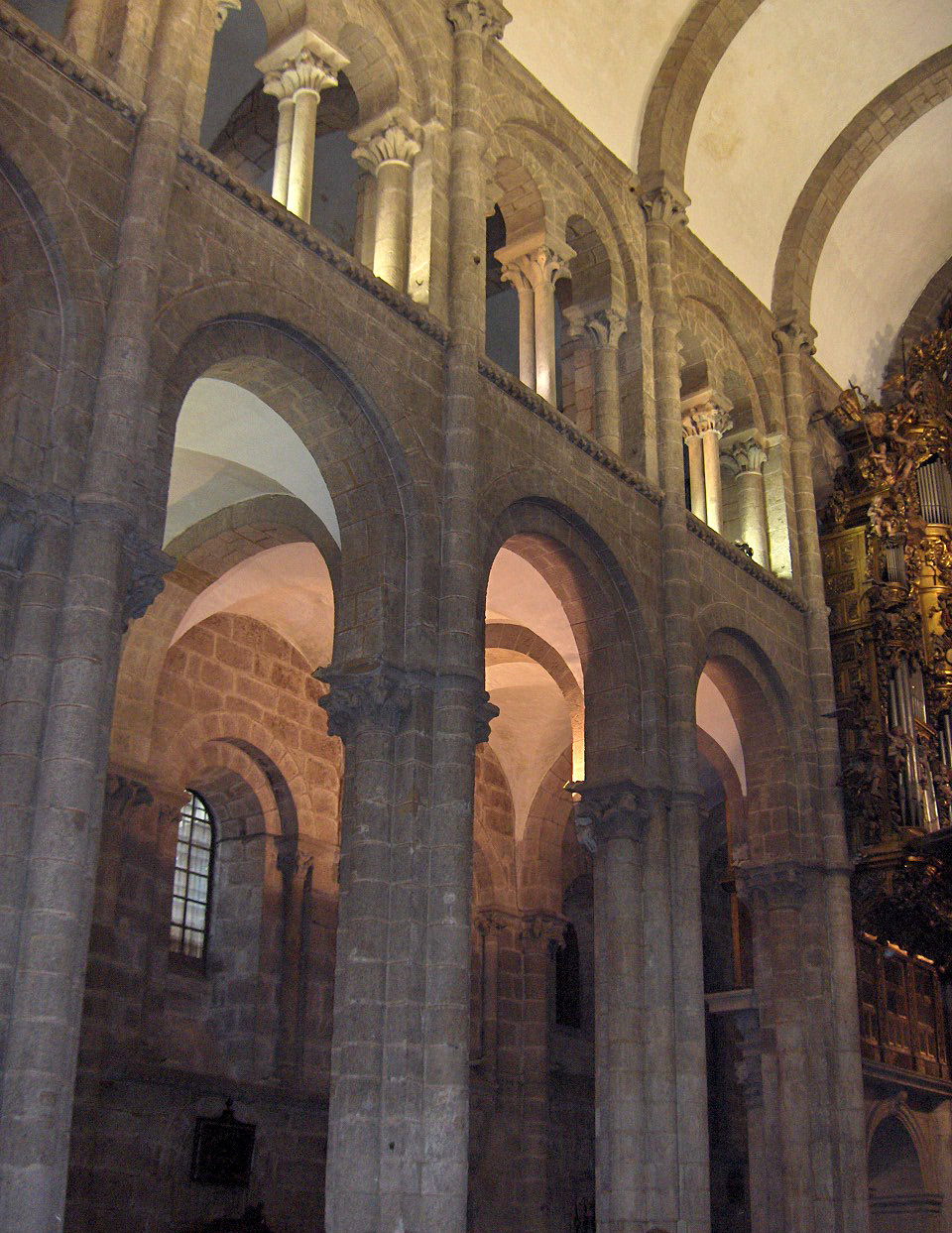
The cathedral of Santiago de Compostela, Spain, has large drum columns with attached shafts supporting a barrel vault.

Durham Cathedral, England, has decorated masonry columns alternating with piers of clustered shafts.

==== Capitals ====
The foliate Corinthian style provided the inspiration for many Romanesque capitals, and the accuracy with which they were carved depended very much on the availability of original models, those in Italian churches such as Pisa Cathedral or church of Sant'Alessandro in Lucca and southern France being much closer to the Classical than those in England.

The Corinthian capital is essentially round at the bottom where it sits on a circular column and square at the top, where it supports the wall or arch. This form of capital was maintained in the general proportions and outline of the Romanesque capital. This was achieved most simply by cutting a rectangular block and taking the four lower corners off at an angle so that the block was square at the top, but octagonal at the bottom, as can be seen at St. Michael's Hildesheim. This shape lent itself to a wide variety of superficial treatments, sometimes foliate in imitation of the source, but often figurative. In Northern Europe the foliate capitals generally bear far more resemblance to the intricacies of manuscript illumination than to Classical sources. In parts of France and Italy, there are strong links to the pierced capitals of Byzantine architecture. It is in the figurative capitals that the greatest originality is shown. While some are dependent on manuscripts illustrations of Biblical scenes and depictions of beasts and monsters, others are lively scenes of the legends of local saints.

The capitals, while retaining the form of a square top and a round bottom, were often compressed into little more than a bulging cushion-shape. This is particularly the case on large masonry columns, or on large columns that alternate with piers as at Durham.(See illustrated above)

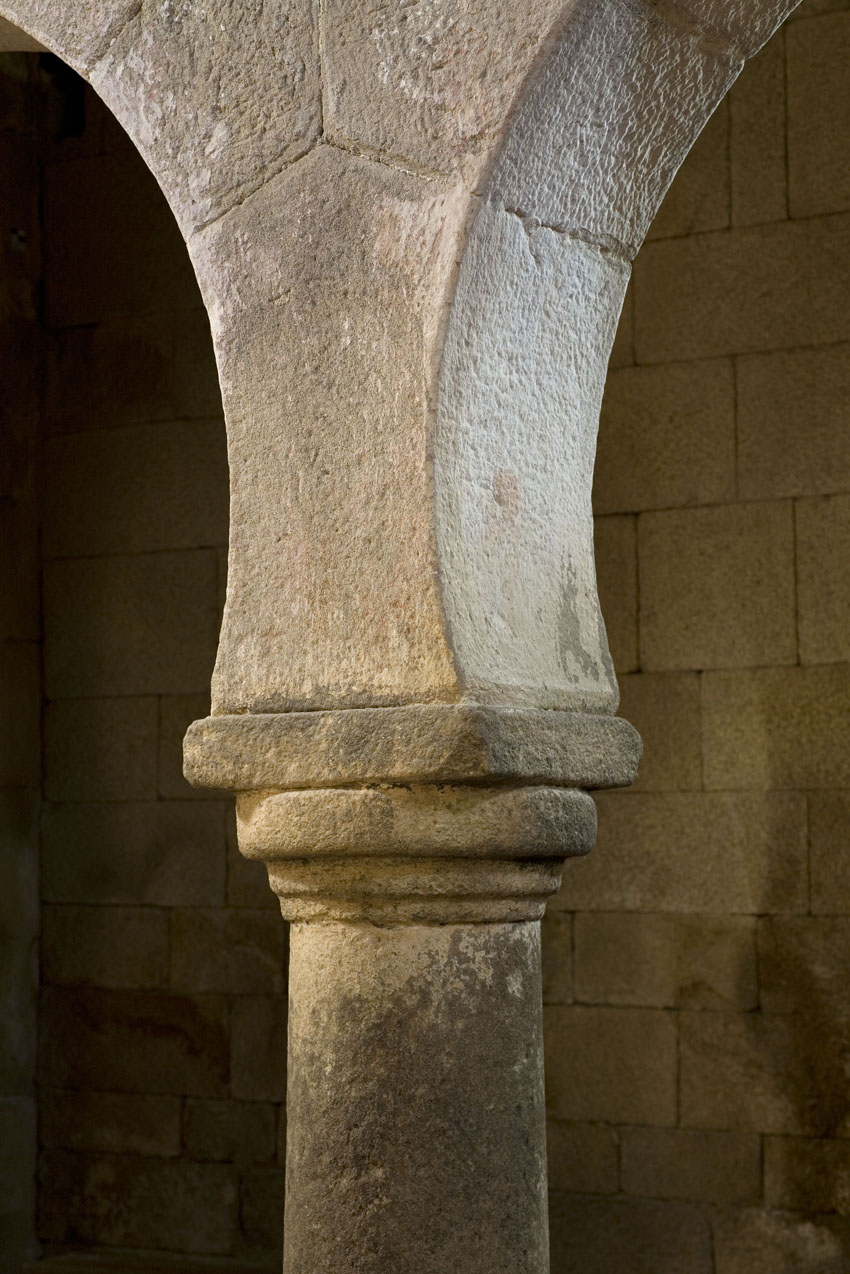
Simple capital of a Doric form supporting a Mozarabic arch, São Pedro de Lourosa Church, Portugal

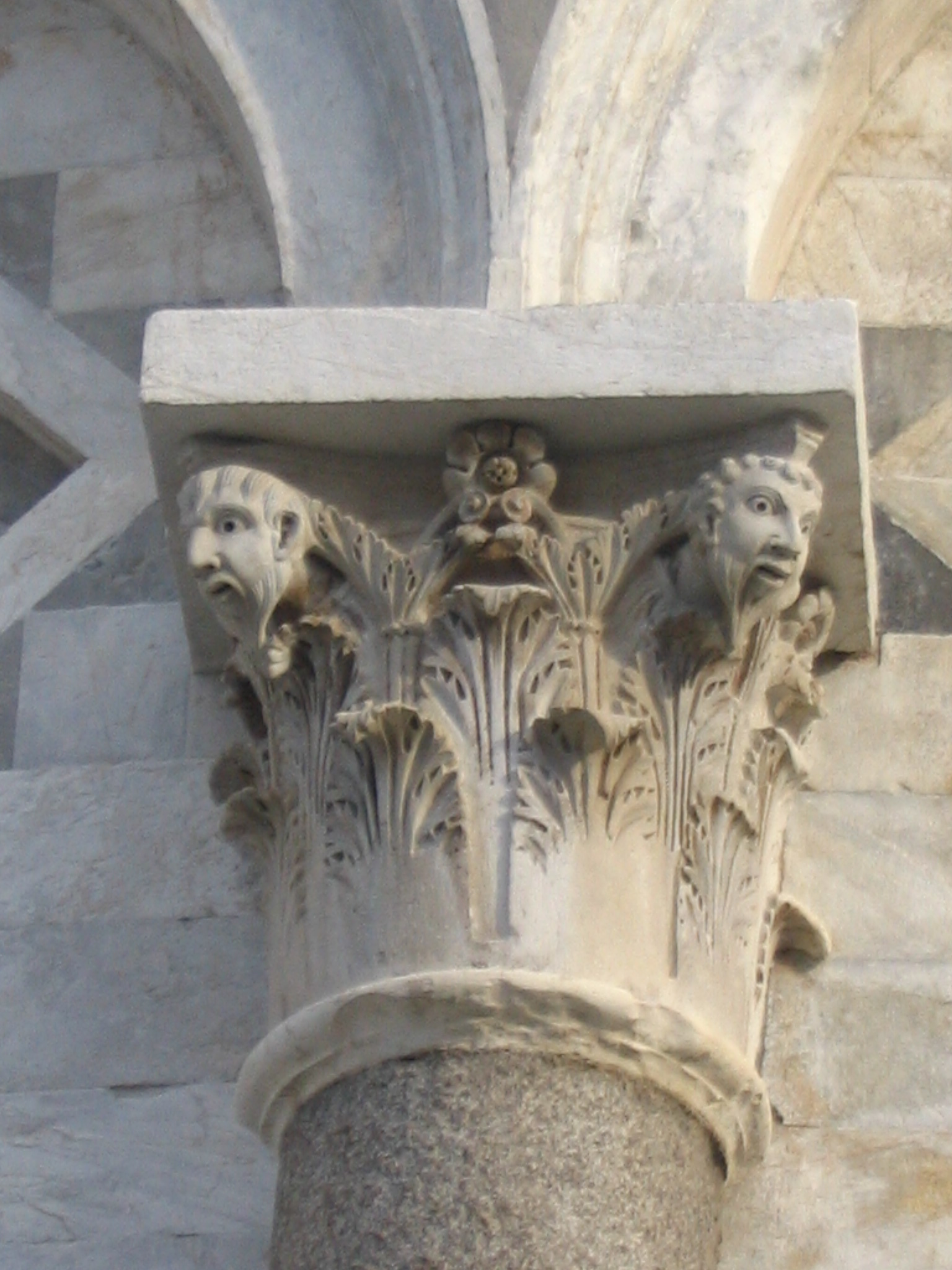
Capital of Corinthian form with anthropomorphised details, Pisa Campanile, Italy

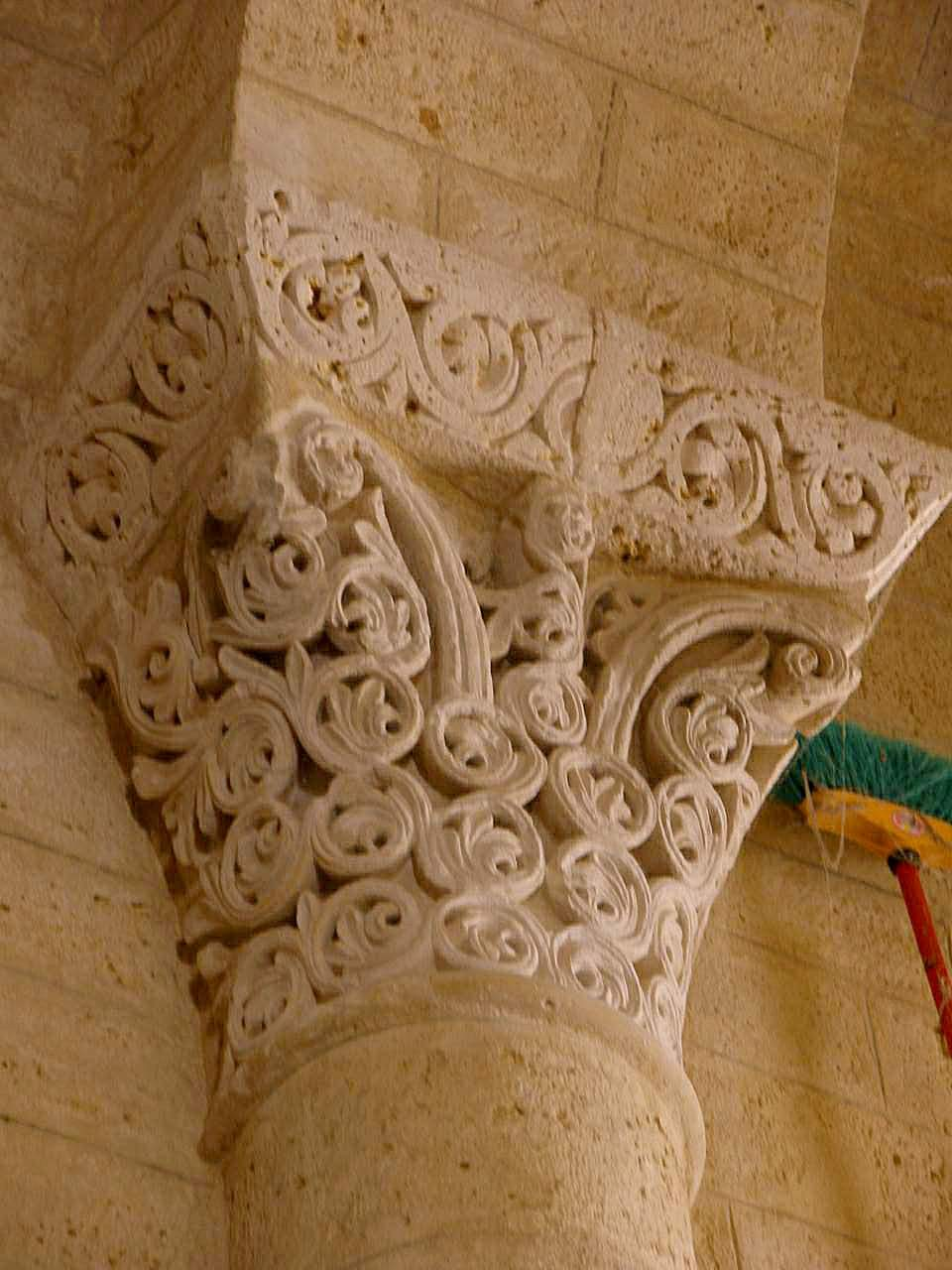
Capital of Corinthian form with Byzantine decoration and carved dosseret, San Martín de Tours, Frómista, Palencia, Spain

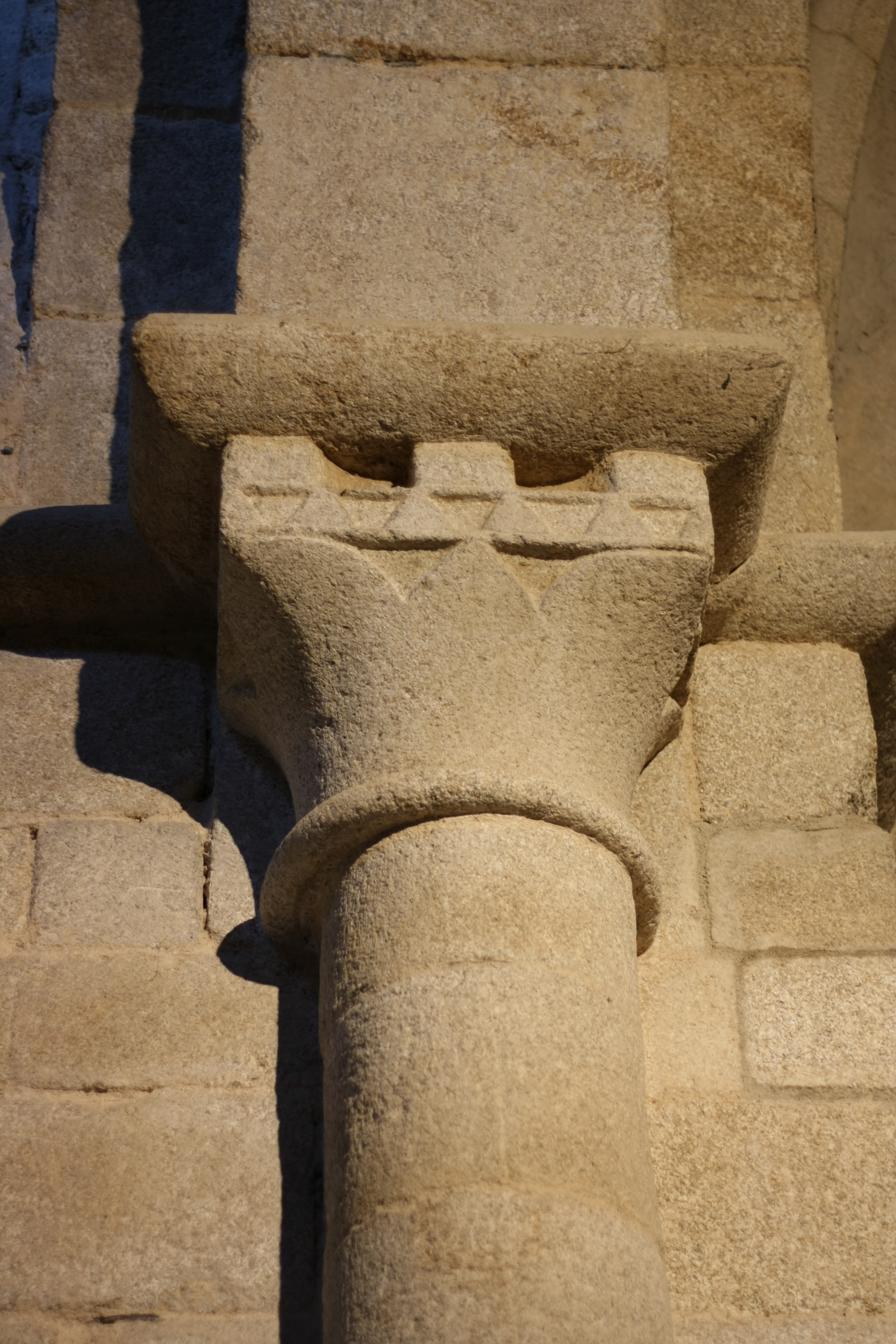
Capital of simplified concave Corinthian form with billeted abacus, simple dosseret and pronounced annulet. Church of Santa Maria, San Martín de Castañeda, Spain.

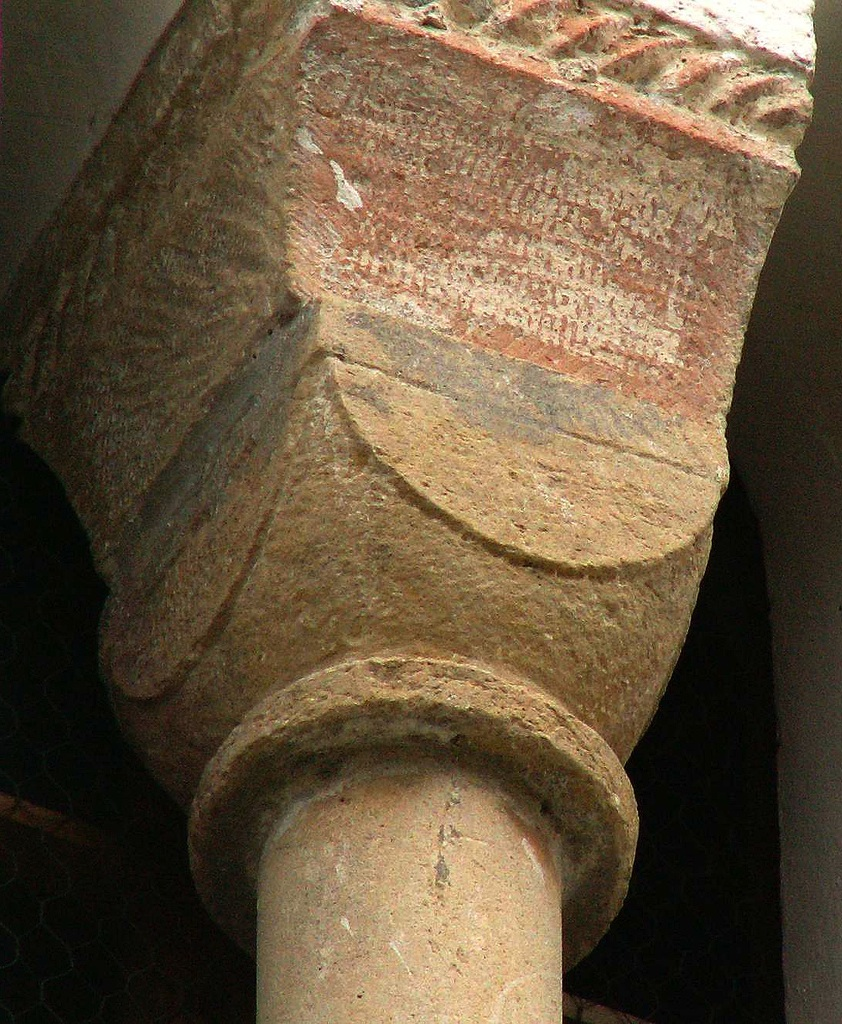
Capital of convex cubic form with its abacus, concave dosseret and cable decoration defined by polychrome. Herina. Capitals of this shape are often decorated with "Barbaric" carvings of foliage, and mythical creatures.

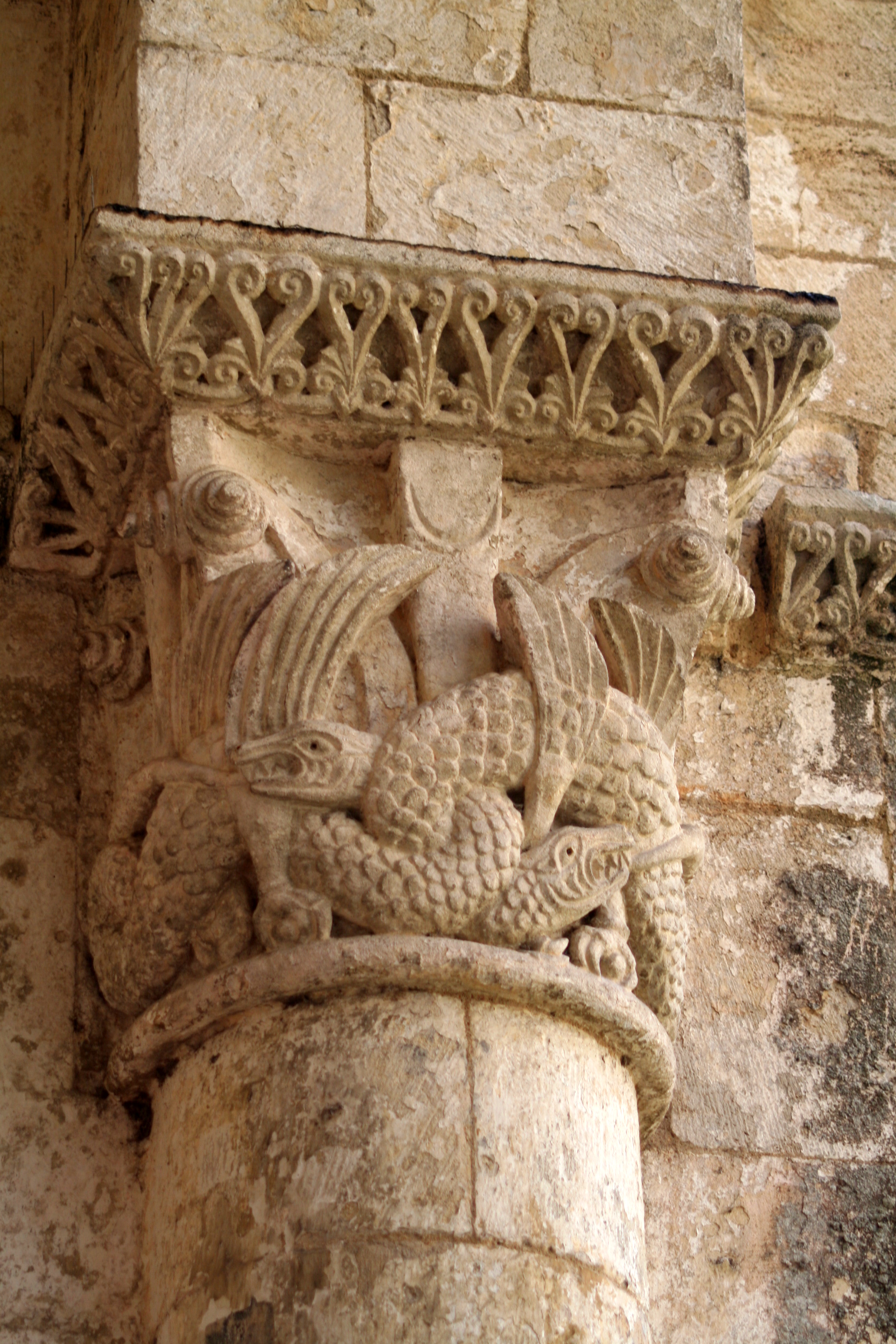
Capital retaining Corinthian form decorated with intertwined beasts derived from Irish manuscripts. Grande-Sauve Abbey, France

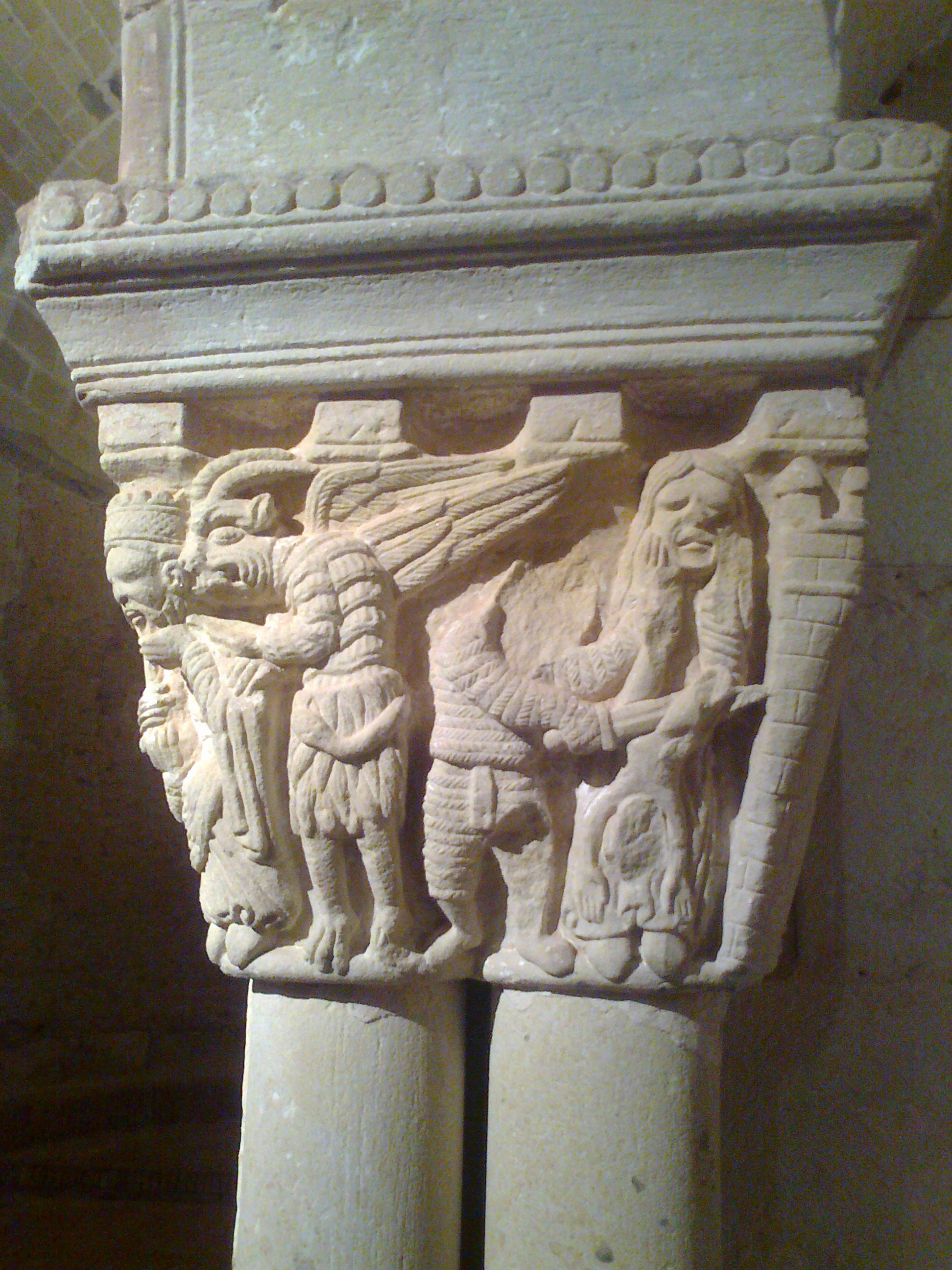
Capital of amorphous form surmounting a cluster of shafts. The figurative carving shows a winged devil directing Herod to slaughter the Innocents. Monastery of San Juan de Duero, Soria, Spain.

=== Vaults and roofs ===
The majority of buildings have wooden roofs, generally of a simple truss, tie beam or king post form. In the case of trussed rafter roofs, they are sometimes lined with wooden ceilings in three sections like those that survive at Ely and Peterborough cathedrals in England. In churches, typically the aisles are vaulted, but the nave is roofed with timber, as is the case at both Peterborough and Ely. In Italy where open wooden roofs are common, and tie beams frequently occur in conjunction with vaults, the timbers have often been decorated as at San Miniato al Monte, Florence.

Vaults of stone or brick took on several different forms and showed marked development during the period, evolving into the pointed ribbed arch characteristic of Gothic architecture.

==== Barrel vault ====
The simplest type of vaulted roof is the barrel vault in which a single arched surface extends from wall to wall, the length of the space to be vaulted, for example, the nave of a church. An important example, which retains medieval paintings, is the vault of Saint-Savin-sur-Gartempe, France, of the early 12th century. However, the barrel vault generally required the support of solid walls, or walls in which the windows were very small.

==== Groin vault ====
Groin vaults occur in early Romanesque buildings, notably at Speyer Cathedral where the high vault of about 1060 is the first employment in Romanesque architecture of this type of vault for a wide nave. In later buildings employing ribbed vaultings, groin vaults are most frequently used for the less visible and smaller vaults, particularly in crypts and aisles. A groin vault is almost always square in plan and is constructed of two barrel vaults intersecting at right angles. Unlike a ribbed vault, the entire arch is a structural member. Groin vaults are frequently separated by transverse arched ribs of low profile as at Speyer and Santiago de Compostela. At Sainte Marie Madeleine, Vézelay, the ribs are square in section, strongly projecting and polychrome.

==== Ribbed vault ====
Ribbed vaults came into general use in the 12th century. In ribbed vaults, not only are there ribs spanning the vaulted area transversely, but each vaulted bay has diagonal ribs, following the same course as the groins in a groin vault. However, whereas in a groin vault, the vault itself is the structural member, in a ribbed vault, it is the ribs that are the structural members, and the spaces between them can be filled with lighter, non-structural material.

Because Romanesque arches are nearly always semi-circular, the structural and design problem inherent in the ribbed vault is that the diagonal span is larger and therefore higher than the transverse span. The Romanesque builders used a number of solutions to this problem. One was to have the centre point where the diagonal ribs met as the highest point, with the infill of all the surfaces sloping upwards towards it, in a domical manner. This solution was employed in Italy at San Michele, Pavia, and Sant' Ambrogio, Milan.

The solution employed in England was to stilt the transverse ribs, maintaining a horizontal central line to the roof like that of a barrel vault. The diagonal ribs could also be depressed, a solution used on the sexpartite vaults at both the Saint-Étienne, (Abbaye-aux-Hommes) and Sainte-Trinité, (Abbaye-aux-Dames) at Caen, France, in the late 11th and early 12th centuries.

==== Pointed arched vault ====
The problems encountered in the structure and appearance of vaults was solved late in the Romanesque period with the introduction of pointed arched ribs which allowed the height of both diagonal and transverse ribs to be varied in proportion to each other. Pointed ribs made their first appearance in the transverse ribs of the vaults at Durham Cathedral in northern England, dating from 1128. Durham is a cathedral of massive Romanesque proportions and appearance, yet its builders introduced several structural features that were new to architectural design and were later to be hallmark features of the Gothic style. Another Gothic structural feature employed at Durham is the flying buttress. However, these are hidden beneath the roofs of the aisles.

The earliest pointed vault in France is that of the narthex of La Madeleine, Vézelay, dating from 1130. They were subsequently employed with the development of the Gothic style at the east end of the Basilica of St Denis in Paris in 1140. An early ribbed vault in the Romanesque architecture of Sicily is that of the chancel at the Cathedral of Cefalù.

==== Domes ====
Domes in Romanesque architecture are generally found within crossing towers at the intersection of a church's nave and transept, which conceal the domes externally. Called a tiburio, this tower-like structure often has a blind arcade near the roof. Romanesque domes are typically octagonal in plan and use corner squinches to translate a square bay into a suitable octagonal base. Octagonal cloister vaults appear "in connection with basilicas almost throughout Europe" between 1050 and 1100. The precise form differs from region to region.

Vaults

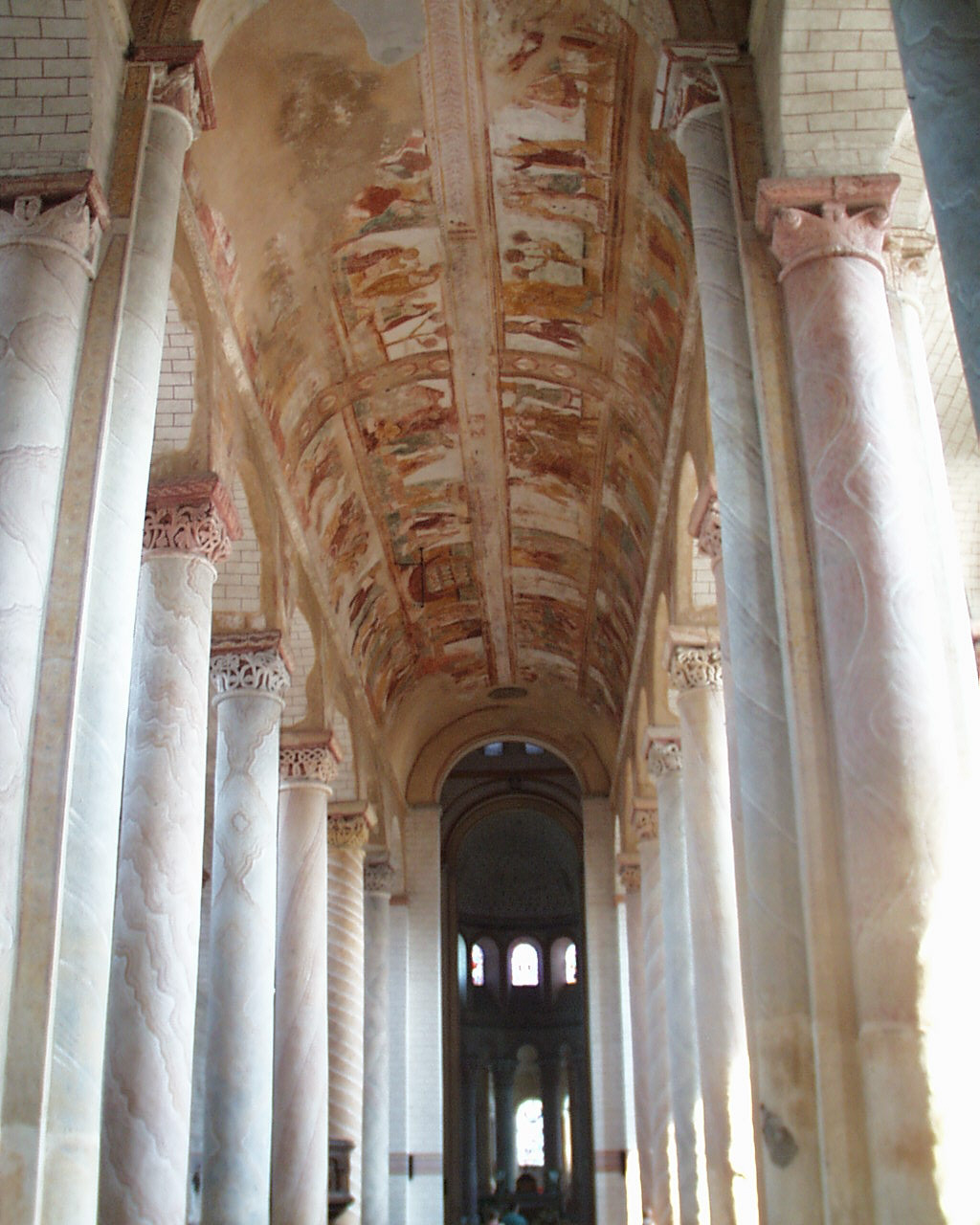
The painted barrel vault at the Abbey Church of Saint-Savin-sur-Gartempe is supported on tall marbled columns.

The nave of Lisbon Cathedral is covered by a series of barrel vaults separated by transverse arches and has an upper, arched gallery (triforium)

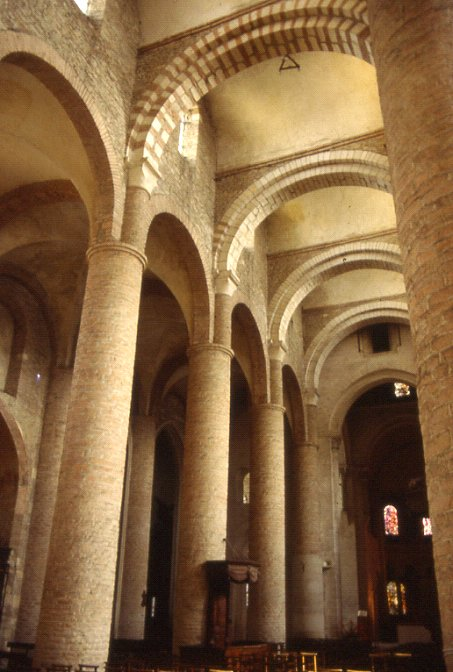
The Church of St Philibert, Tournus, has a series of transverse barrel vaults supported on diaphragm arches.

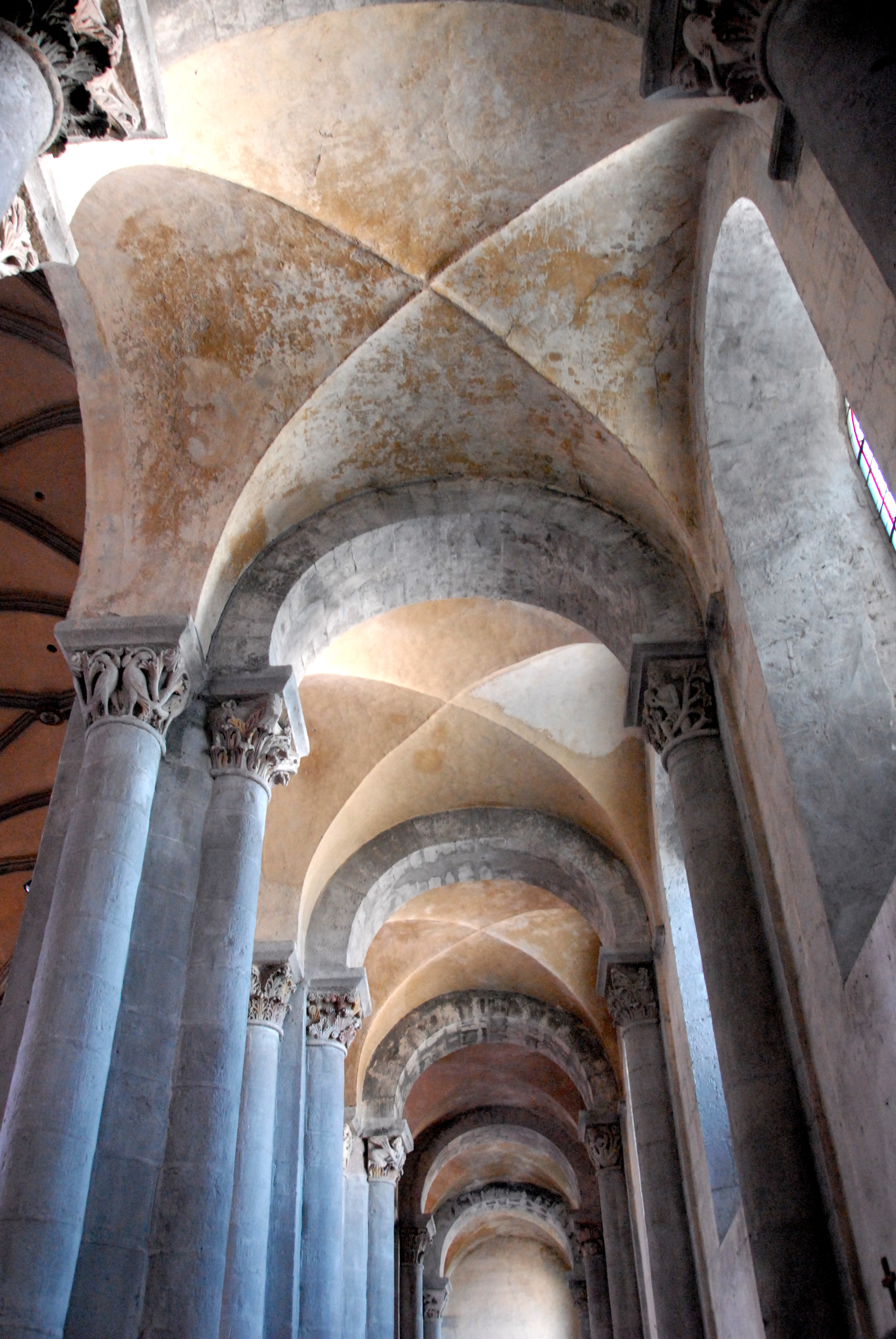
The aisle of the Abbey Church at Mozac has groin vaults supported on transverse arches.

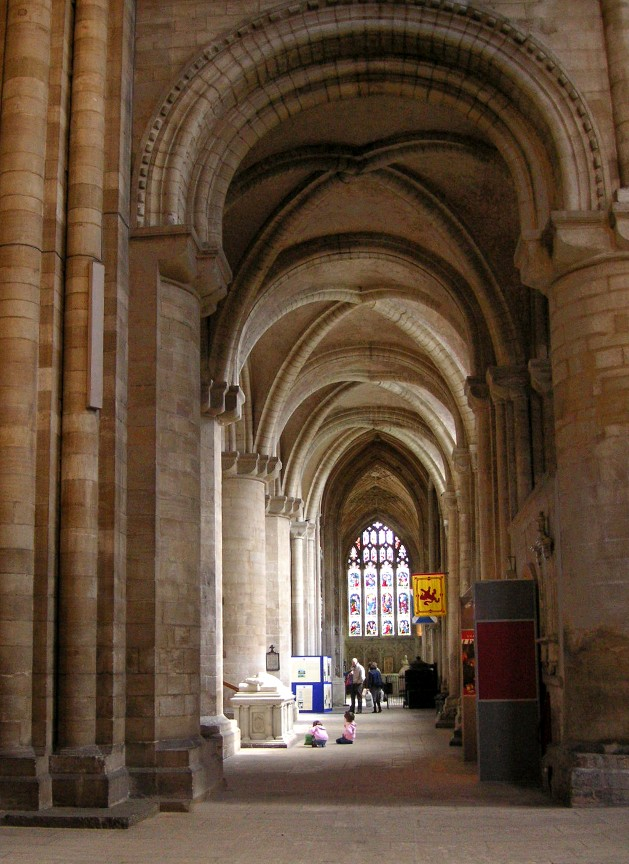
The aisles at Peterborough Cathedral have quadripartite ribbed vaults. (The nave has an ancient painted wooden ceiling.)

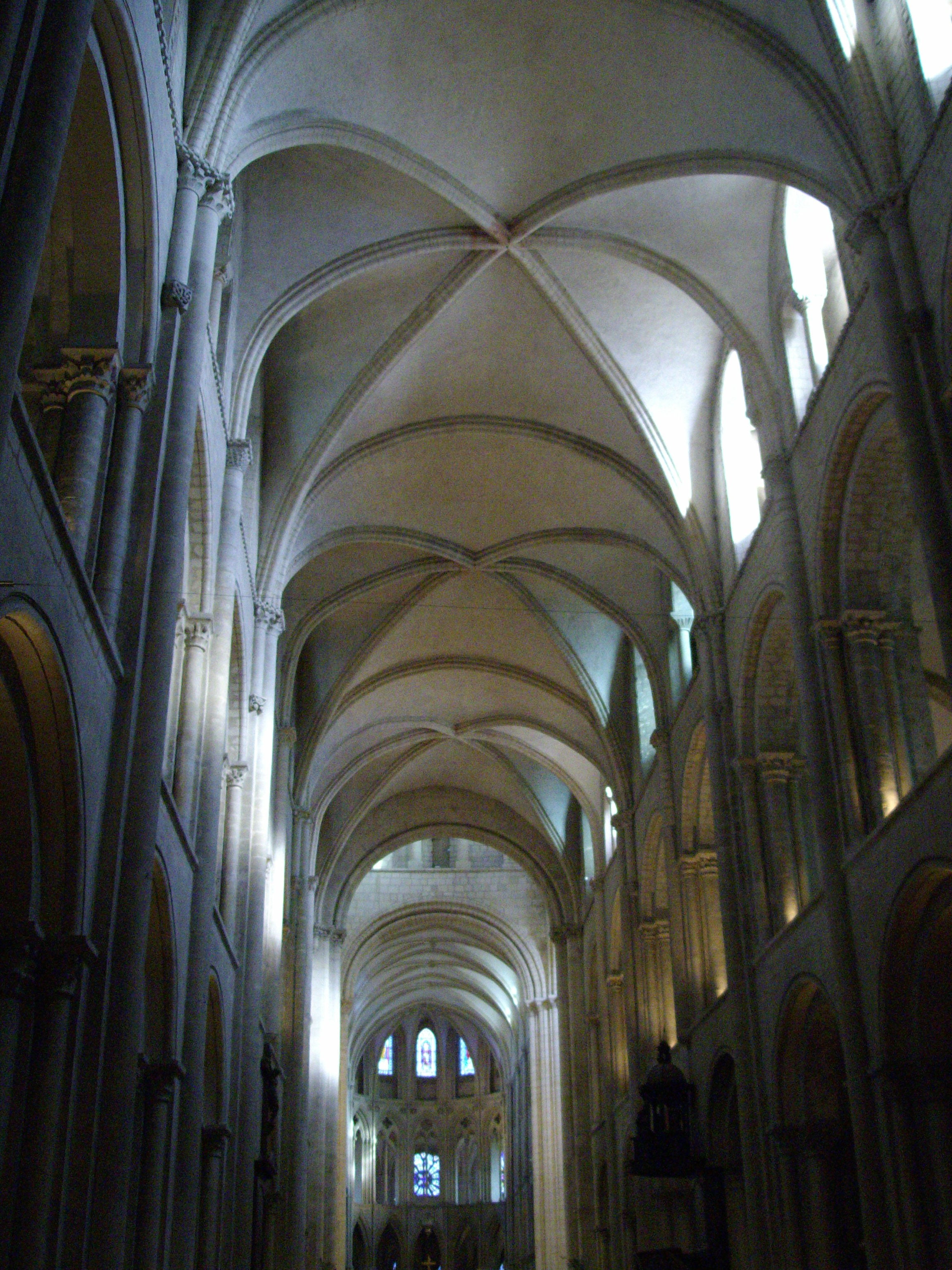
The ribbed vaults at Saint-Étienne, Caen, are sexpartite and span two bays of the nave.

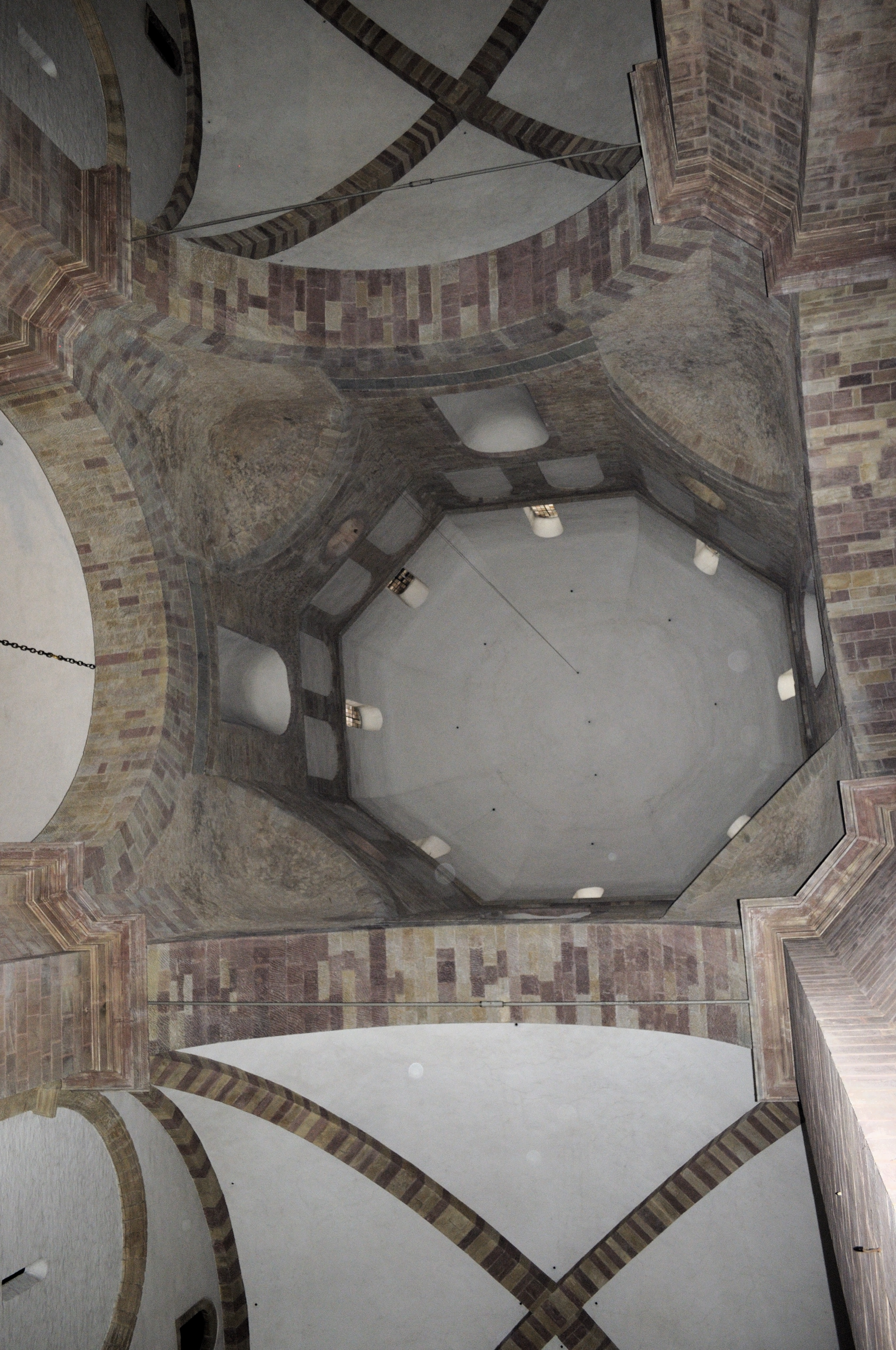
The crossing of Speyer Cathedral, Germany, has a dome on squinches.

== Ecclesiastical architecture ==
=== Plan ===
Many parish churches, abbey churches and cathedrals are in the Romanesque style, or were originally built in the Romanesque style and have subsequently undergone changes. The simplest Romanesque churches are aisleless halls with a projecting apse at the chancel end, or sometimes, particularly in England, a projecting rectangular chancel with a chancel arch that might be decorated with mouldings. More ambitious churches have aisles separated from the nave by arcades.

Abbey and cathedral churches generally follow the Latin Cross plan. In England, the extension eastward may be long, while in Italy it is often short or non-existent, the church being of T plan, sometimes with apses on the transept ends as well as to the east. In France the church of St Front, Périgueux, appears to have been modelled on St. Mark's Basilica, Venice, or the Byzantine Church of the Holy Apostles and is of a Greek cross plan with five domes. In the same region, Angoulême Cathedral is an aisleless church of the Latin cross plan, more usual in France, but is also roofed with domes. In Germany, Romanesque churches are often of distinctive form, having apses at both east and west ends, the main entrance being central to one side. It is probable that this form came about to accommodate a baptistery at the west end.

NOTE: The plans below do not show the buildings in their current states.

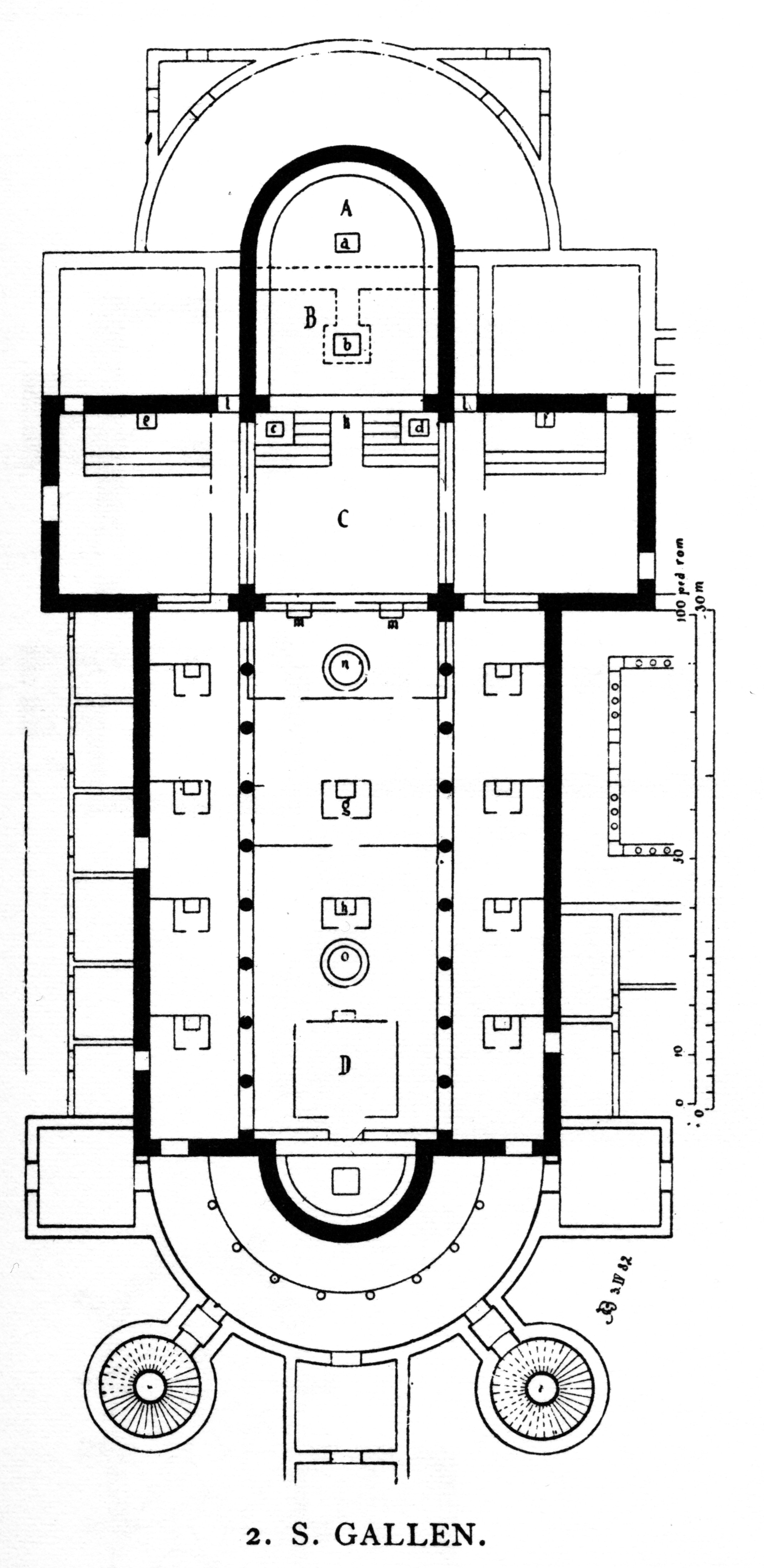
The plan of the Abbey of St Gall, Switzerland

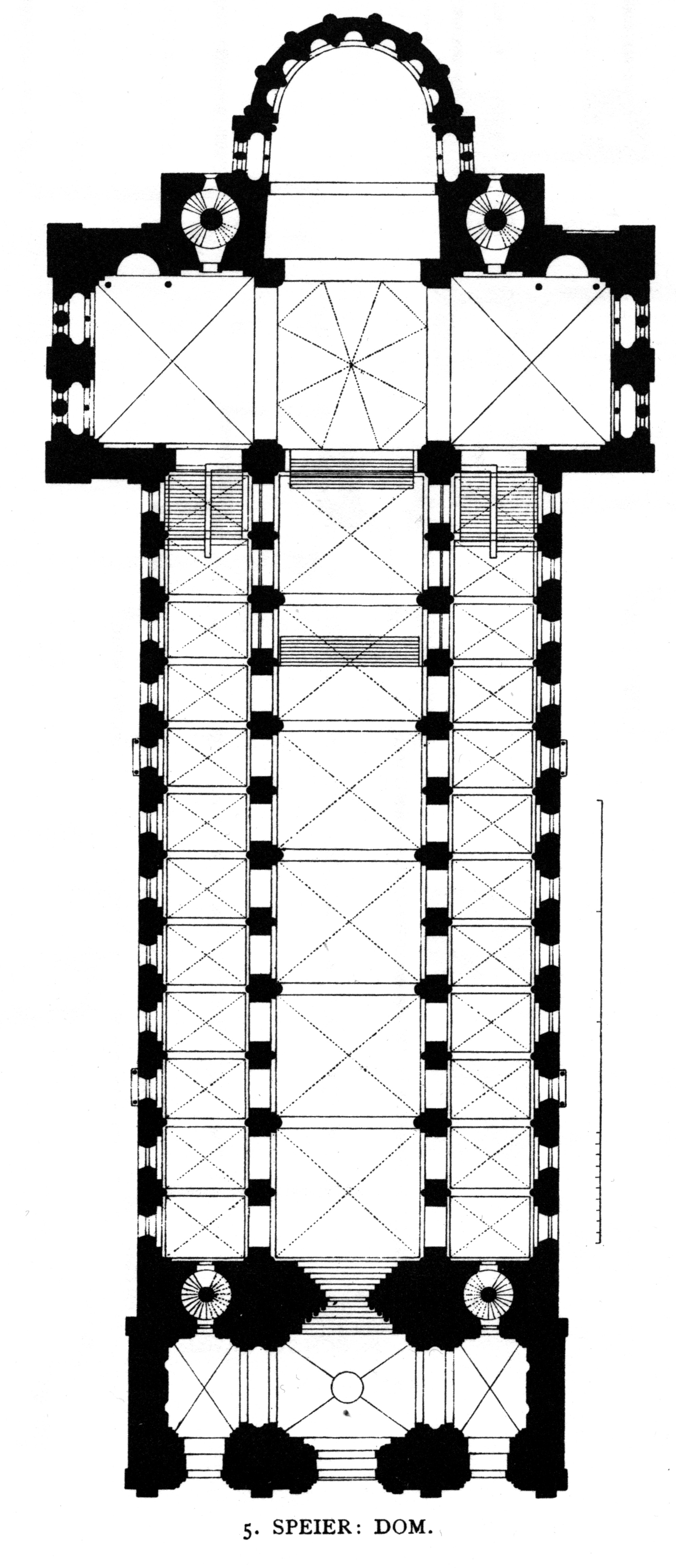
Germany, Speyer Cathedral

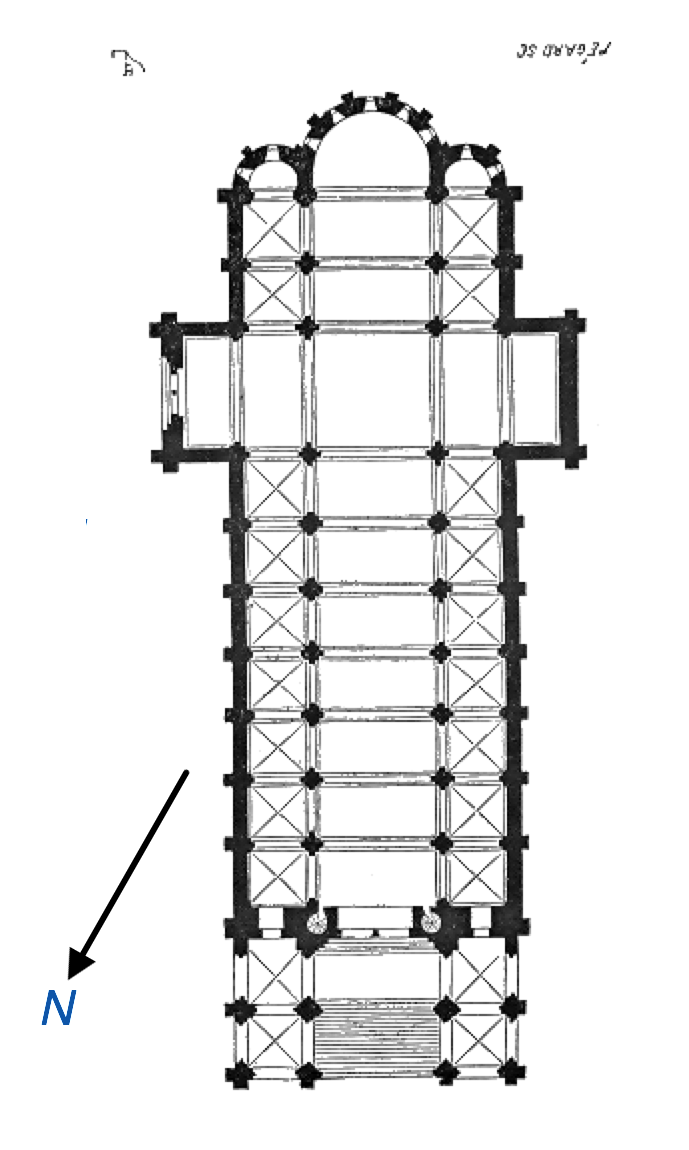
France, Autun Cathedral

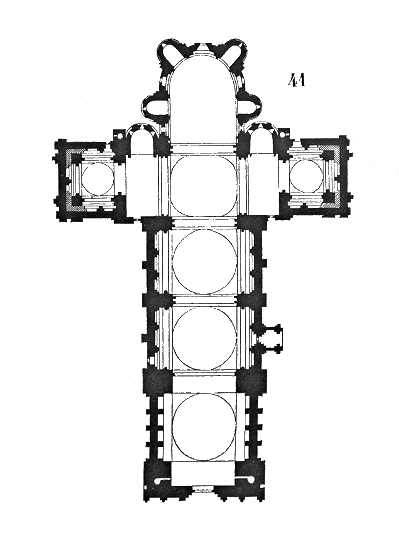
France, Angoulême Cathedral
England, Durham Cathedral

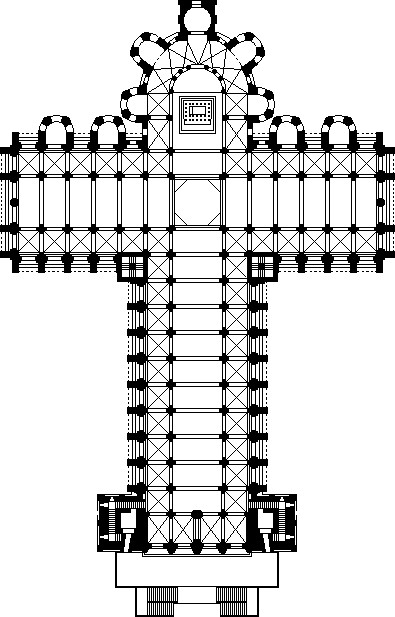
Spain, Cathedral of Santiago de Compostela

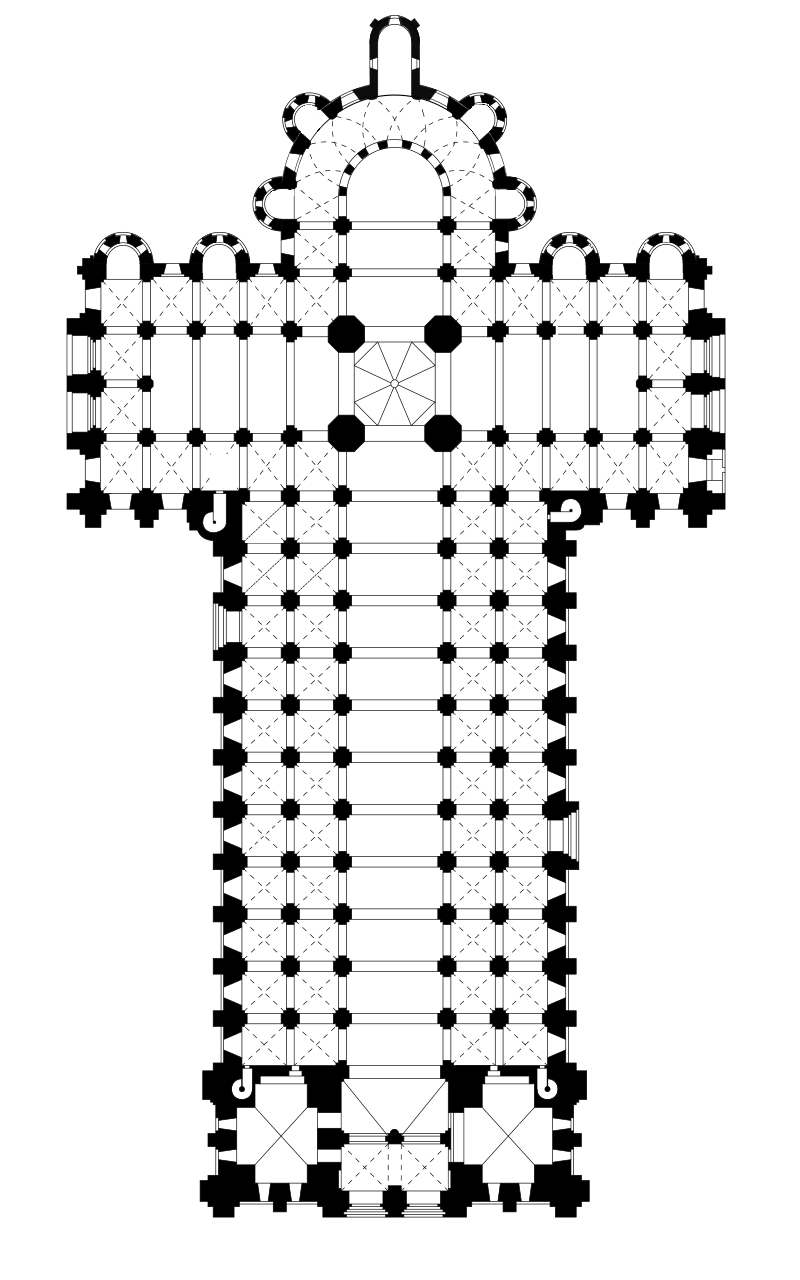
France, Basilica of Saint-Sernin, Toulouse

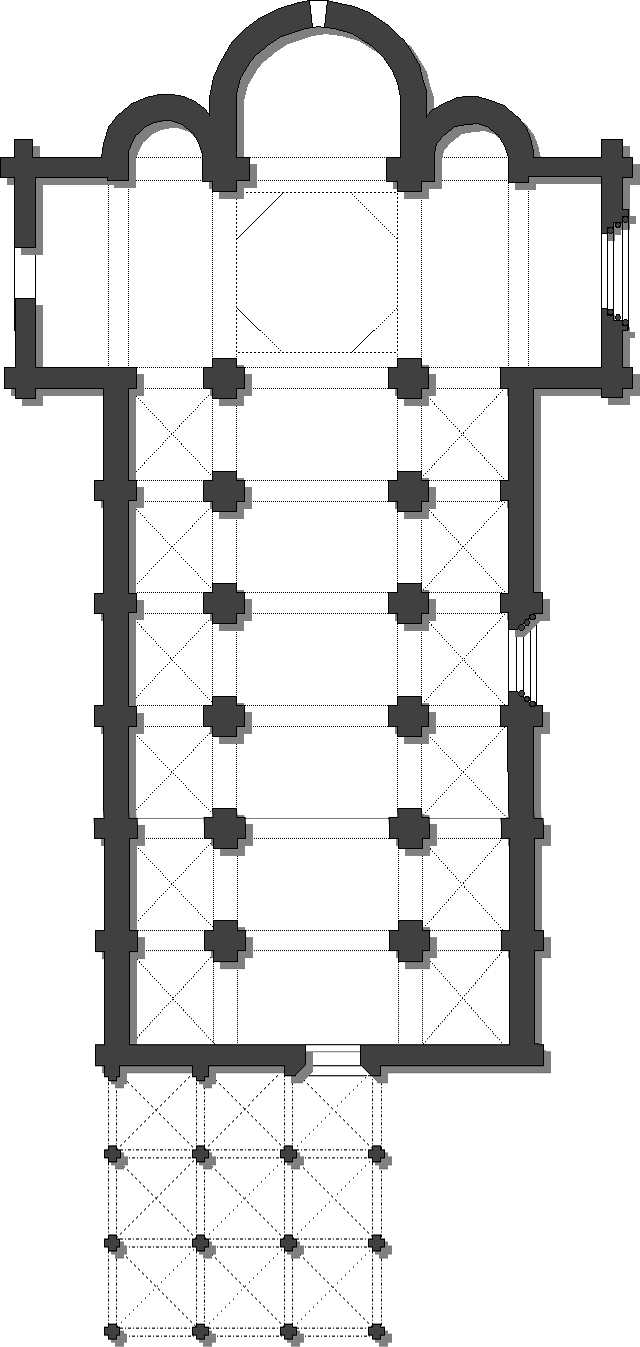
Spain, San Isidoro de León

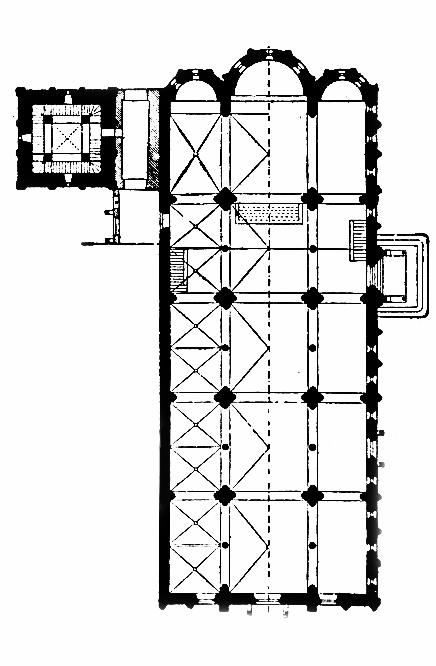
Italy, Modena Cathedral

The Abbey Church of St. Gall, Switzerland, shows the plan that was to become common throughout Germanic Europe. It is a Latin Cross with a comparatively long nave and short transepts and eastern end, which is apsidal. The nave is aisled, but the chancel and transepts are not. It has an apsidal west end, which was to become a feature of Churches of Germany, such as Worms Cathedral. Speyer Cathedral, Germany, also has aisleless transept and chancel. It has a markedly modular look. A typical Germanic characteristic is the presence of towers framing the chancel and the west end. There is marked emphasis on the western entrance, called Westwerk, which is seen in several other churches. Each vault compartment covers two narrow bays of the nave.

At Autun Cathedral, France, the pattern of the nave bays and aisles extends beyond the crossing and into the chancel, each aisle terminating in an apse. Each nave bay is separated at the vault by a transverse rib. Each transept projects to the width of two nave bays. The entrance has a narthex which screens the main portal. This type of entrance was to be elaborated in the Gothic period on the transepts at Chartres. Angoulême Cathedral, France, is one of several instances in which the Byzantine churches of Constantinople seem to have been influential in the design in which the main spaces are roofed by domes. This structure has necessitated the use of very thick walls, and massive piers from which the domes spring. There are radiating chapels around the apse, which is a typically French feature and was to evolve into the chevet.

As was typically the case in England, Ely Cathedral was a Benedictine monastery, serving both monastic and secular function. To facilitate this, the chancel or "presbytery" is longer than usually found in Europe, as are the aisled transepts which contained chapels. In England, emphasis was placed on the orientation of the chapels to the east. The very large piers at the crossing signify that there was once a tower. The western end having two round towers flanking a tall central tower was unique in Britain. Ely Cathedral was never vaulted and retains a wooden ceiling over the nave.

The cathedral of Santiago de Compostela shares many features with Ely, but is typically Spanish in its expansive appearance. Santiago held the body of St. James and was the most significant pilgrimage site in Europe. The narthex, the aisles, the large aisled transepts and numerous projecting chapels reflect this. The chancel is short, compared to that of Ely, and the altar set so as to provide clear view to a vast congregation simultaneously.

The basilica Saint-Sernin of Toulouse is a typical example of a pilgrimage church. It is very large and its interior plan made it possible to direct traffic. With double side aisles and with an aisled transept and an ambulatory surrounding the apse, pilgrims could make the circuit around the church and were able to stop for meditation and prayer at the apsidal chapels of the transept and the radiating chapels of the choir.

Modena Cathedral shows a typically Italian Romanesque plan, often architecturally termed a "basilica", because of its similarity in plan to a Roman basilicas.

=== Section ===
In section, the typical aisled church or cathedral has a nave with a single aisle on either side. The nave and aisles are separated by an arcade carried on piers or on columns. The roof of the aisle and the outer walls help to buttress the upper walls and vault of the nave, if present. Above the aisle roof are a row of windows known as the clerestory, which give light to the nave. During the Romanesque period there was a development from this two-stage elevation to a three-stage elevation in which there is a gallery, known as a triforium, between the arcade and the clerestory. This varies from a simple blind arcade decorating the walls, to a narrow arcaded passage, to a fully developed second story with a row of windows lighting the gallery.

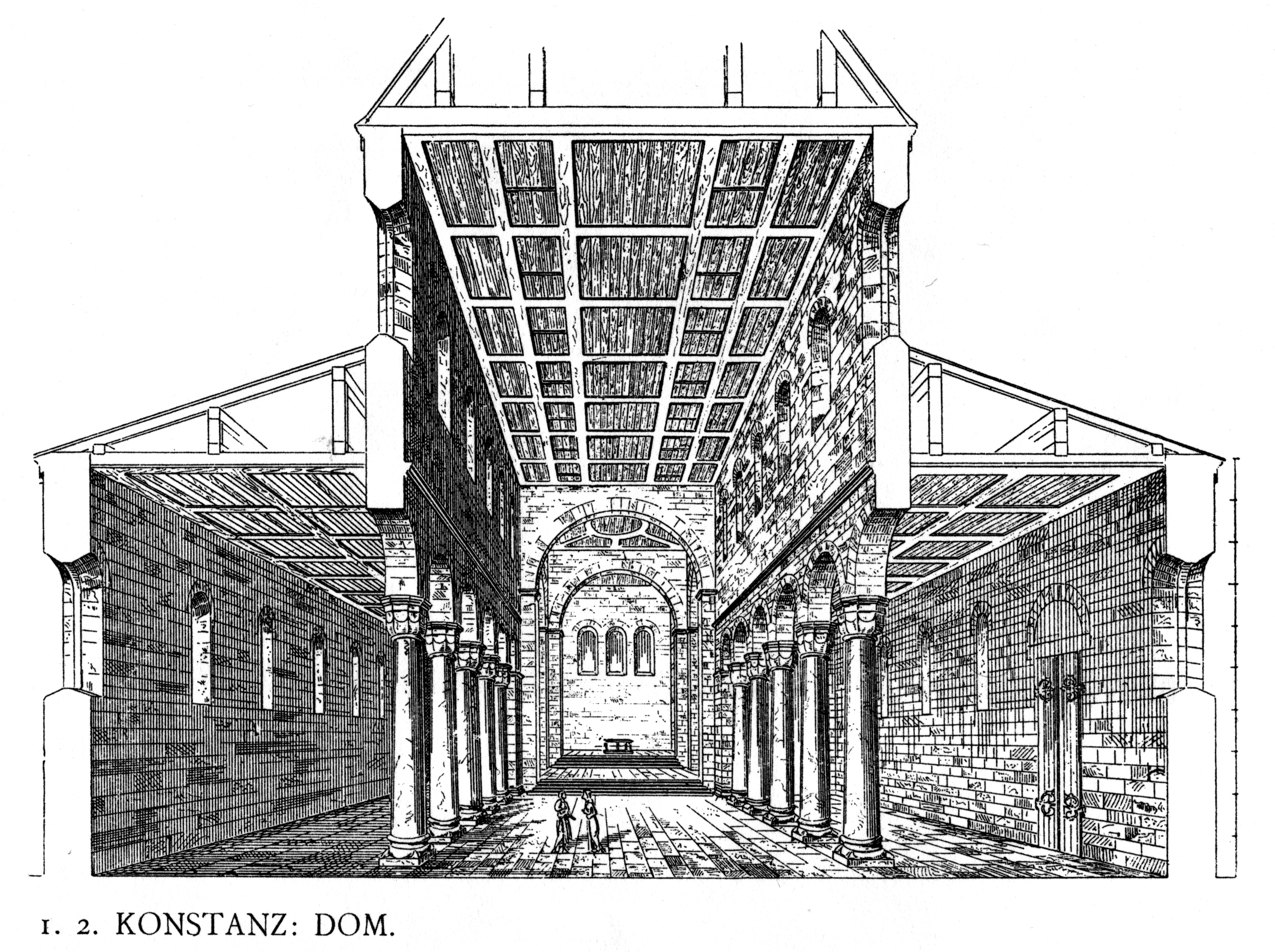
This drawing is a reconstruction by Dehio of the appearance of the Romanesque Konstanz Cathedral before its alterations in the Gothic style. It has a typical elevation of nave and aisles with wooden panelled ceilings and an apsidal east end.

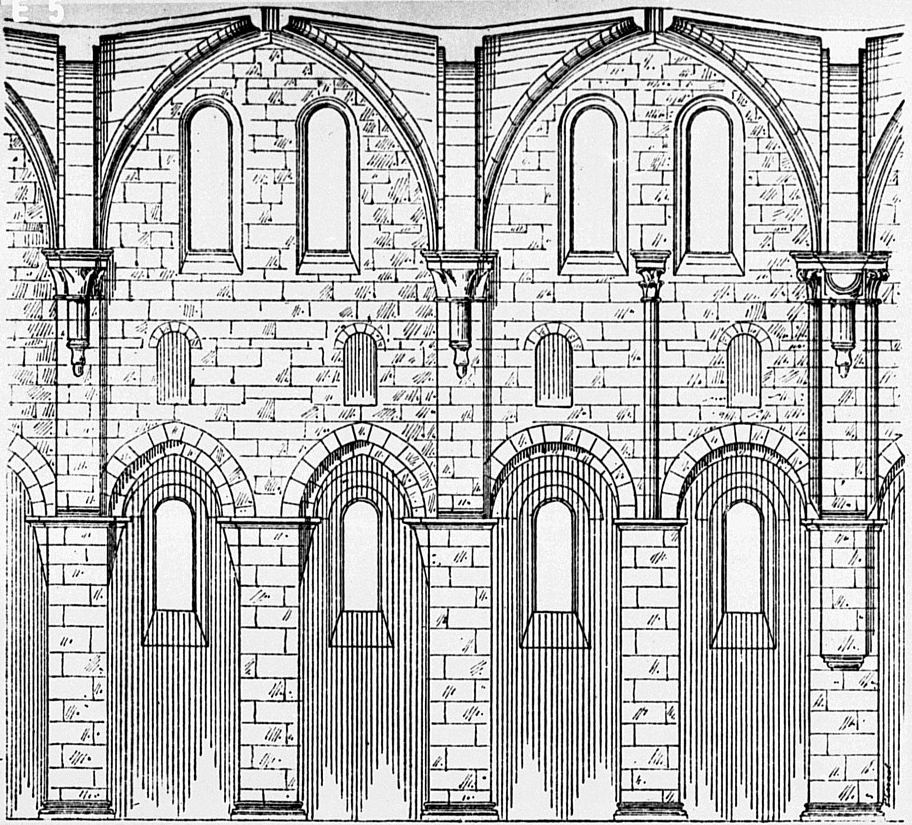
This nave elevation of Arnsburg Abbey, Germany, shows the typical arrangement of the nave arcade, aisle, clerestory windows and ribbed vault.

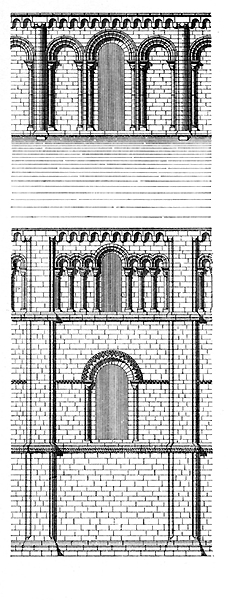
Exterior elevation, Peterborough Cathedral

=== Church and cathedral east ends ===
The eastern end of a Romanesque church is almost always semi-circular, with either a high chancel surrounded by an ambulatory as in France, or a square end from which an apse projects as in Germany and Italy. Where square ends exist in English churches, they are probably influenced by Anglo-Saxon churches. Peterborough and Norwich Cathedrals have retained round east ends in the French style. However, in France, simple churches without apses and with no decorative features were built by the Cistercians who also founded many houses in England, frequently in remote areas.

East ends

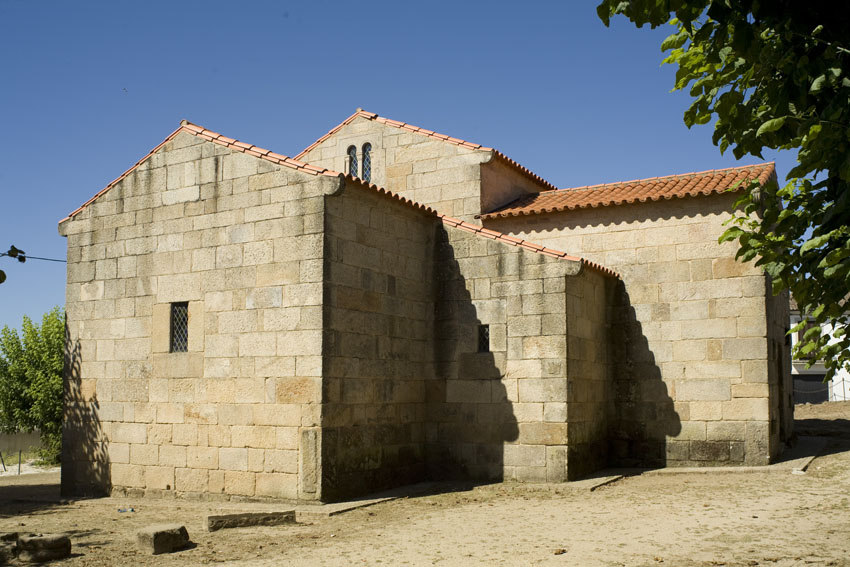
Rural church of São Pedro de Lourosa, Portugal, built in the 10th century. It has the simplest type of square-shape apsidal east end.

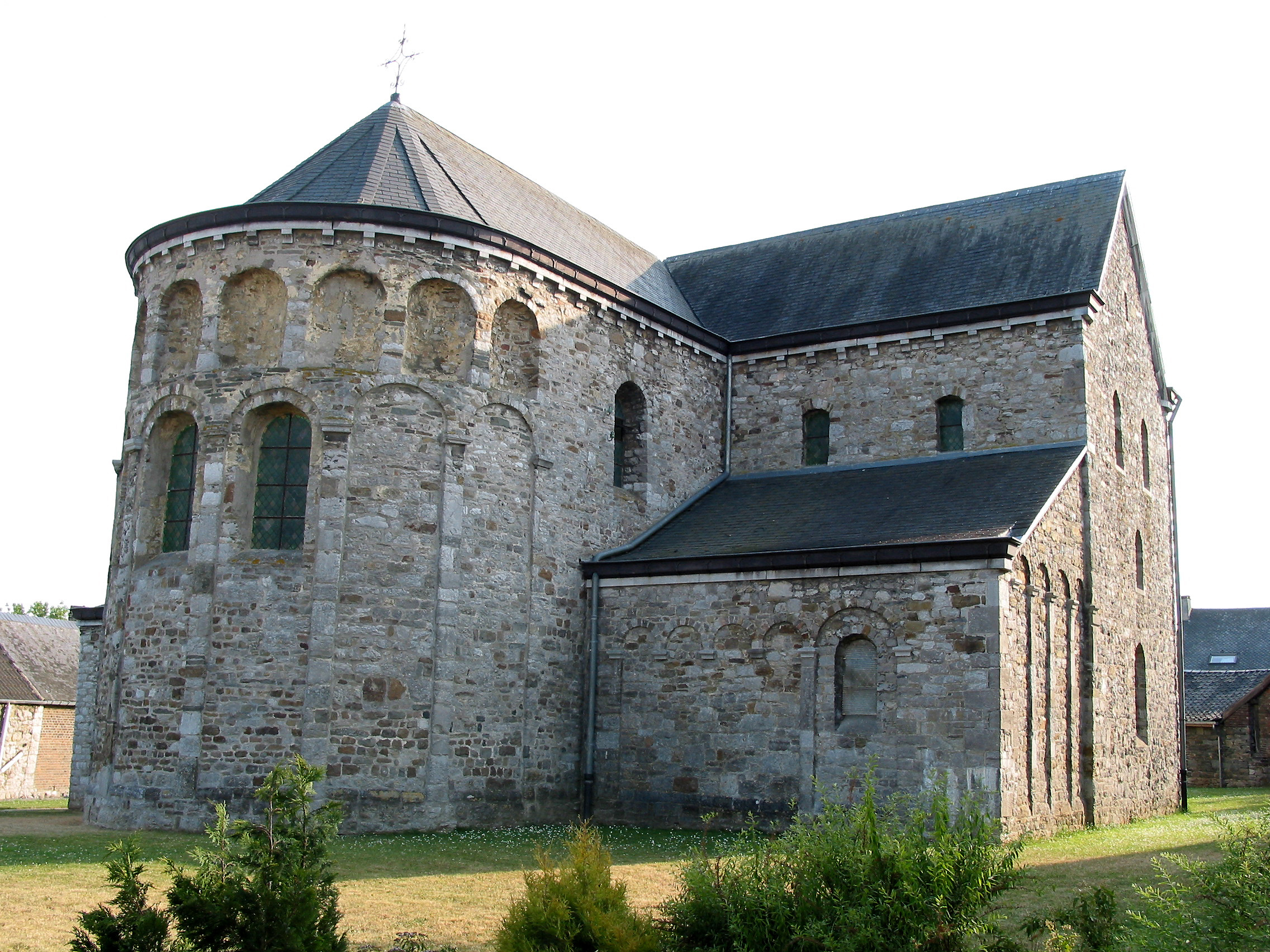
The small church of Saint-Pierre Xhignesse, Belgium, already has a semi-circular termination at the same height as the choir and nave.

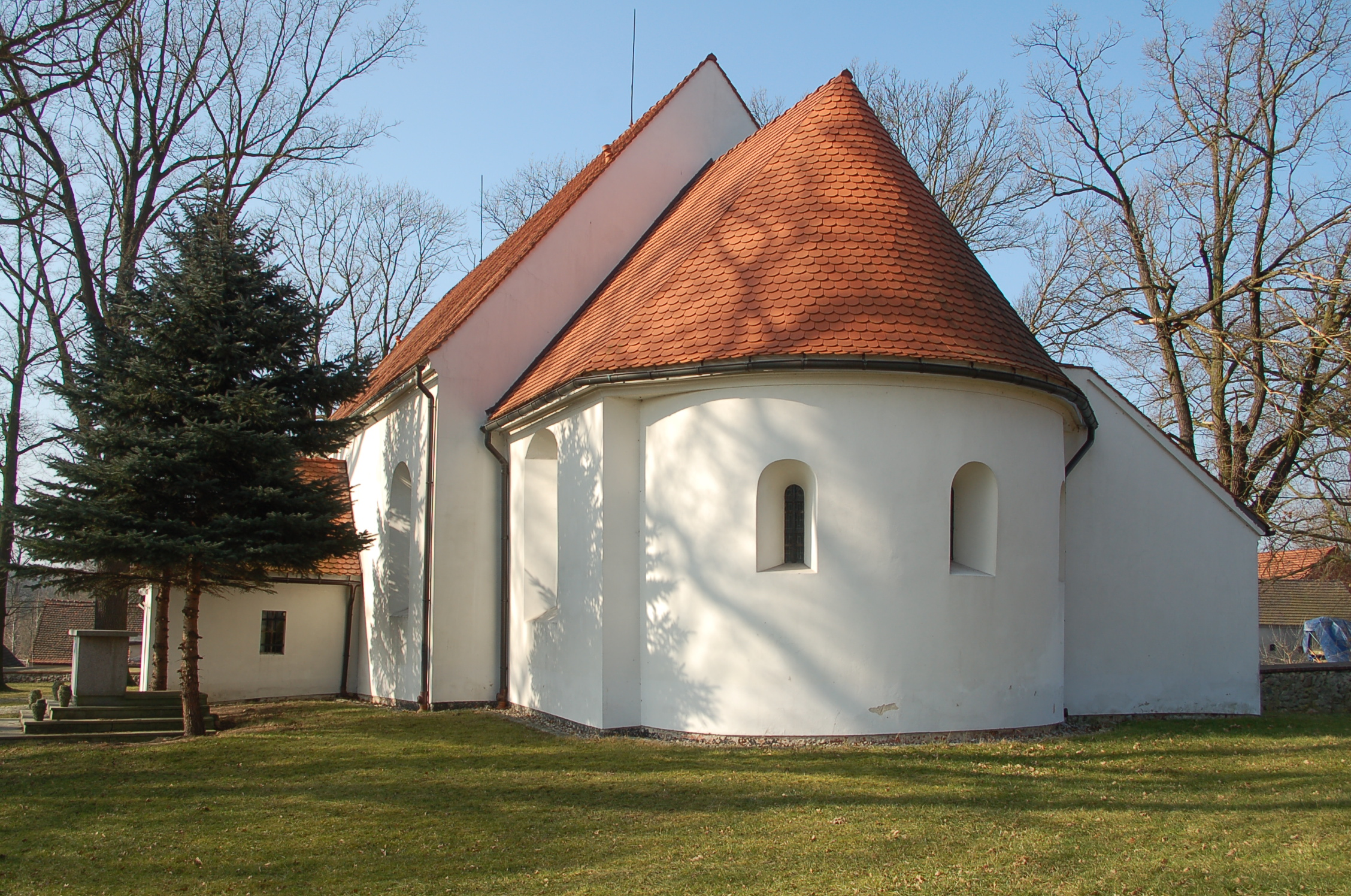
The small church of Saint-Andreas Szprotawa, Poland, built in the 13th century has an apsidal east end projecting from a chancel.

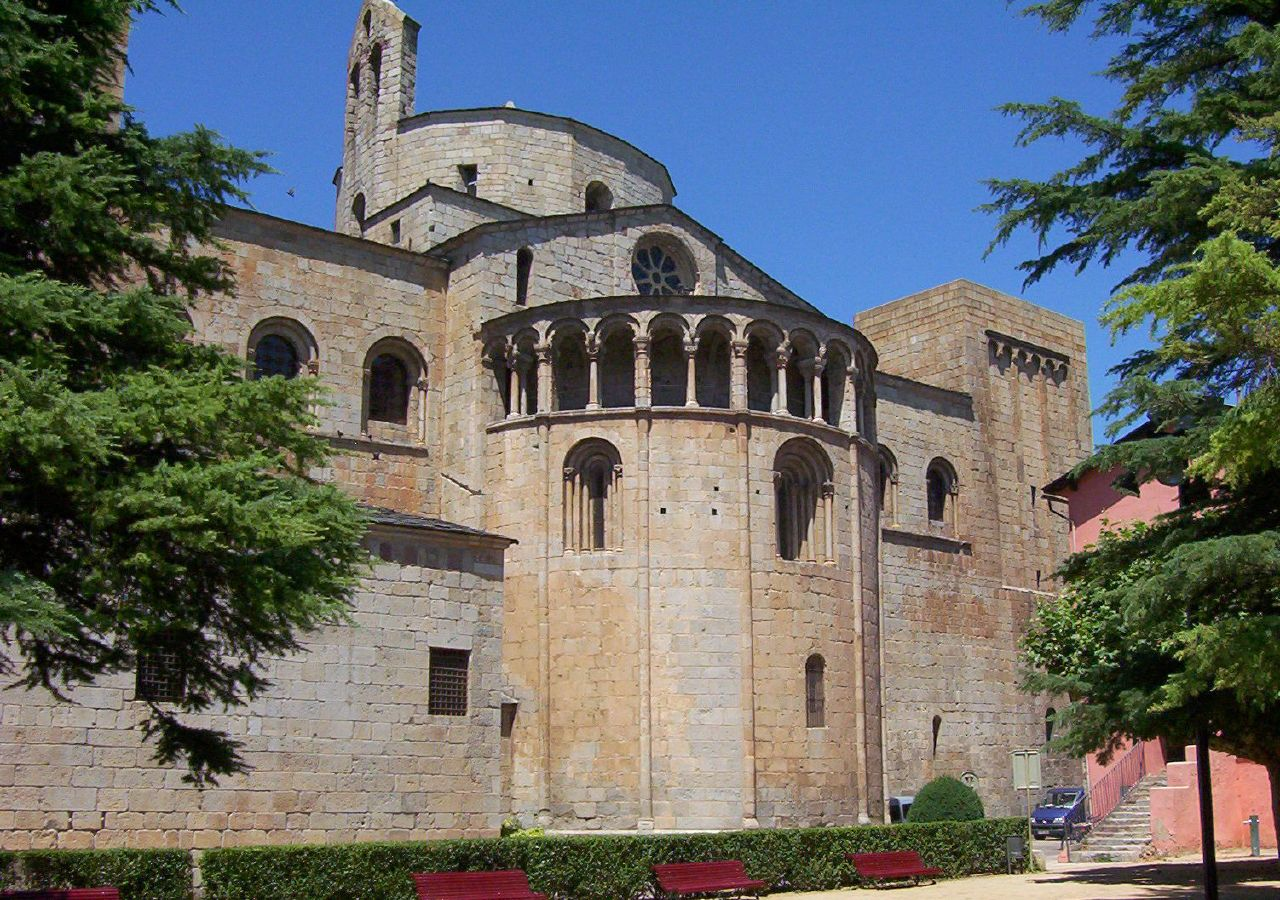
The Cathedral of Santa Maria d'Urgell, Spain, has an apsidal east end projecting at a lower level to the choir and decorated with an arcade below the roofline. This form is usual in Italy and Germany.

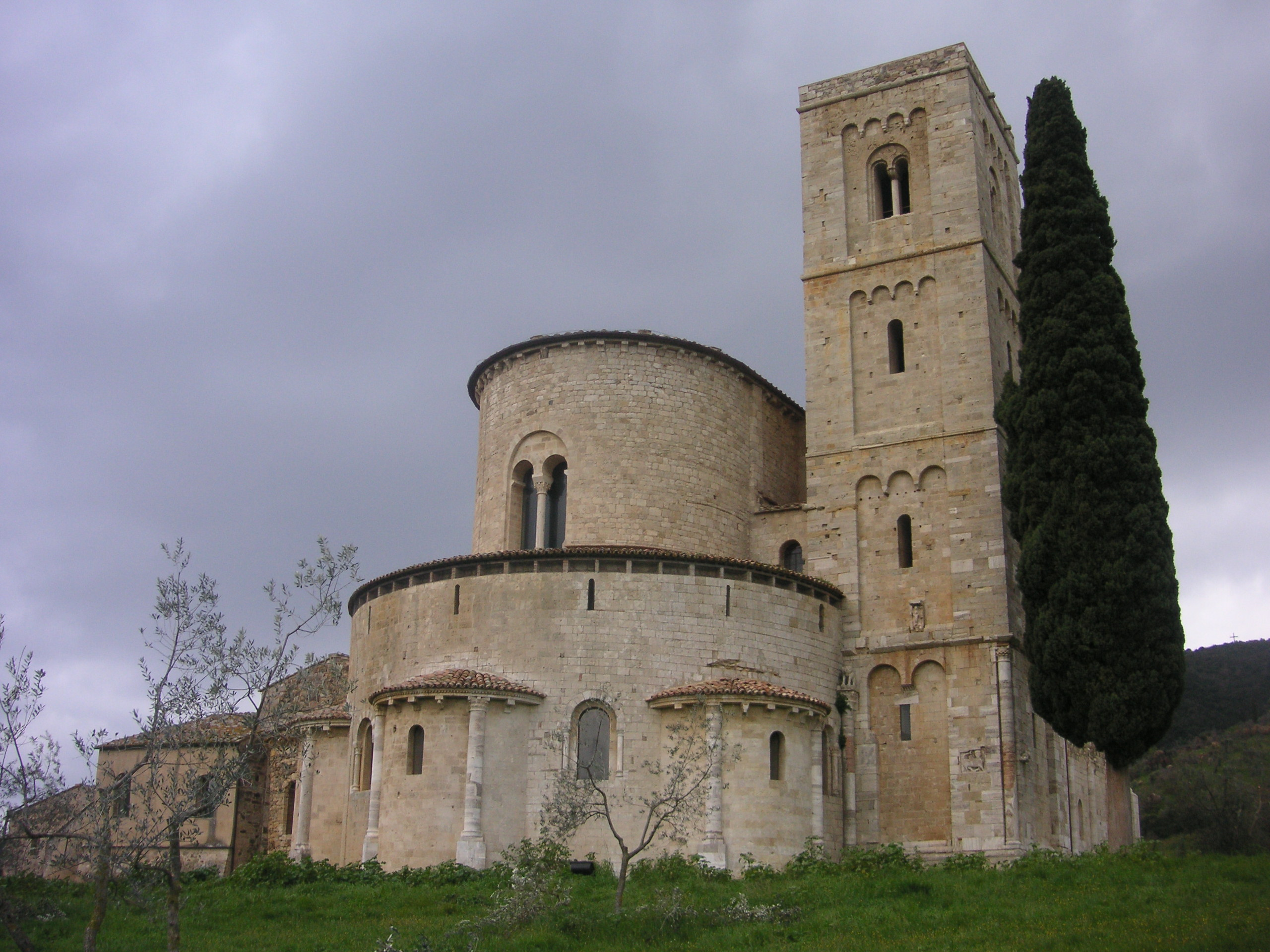
The Abbey of Sant'Antimo has a high apsidal end surrounded by an ambulatory and with small projecting apses.

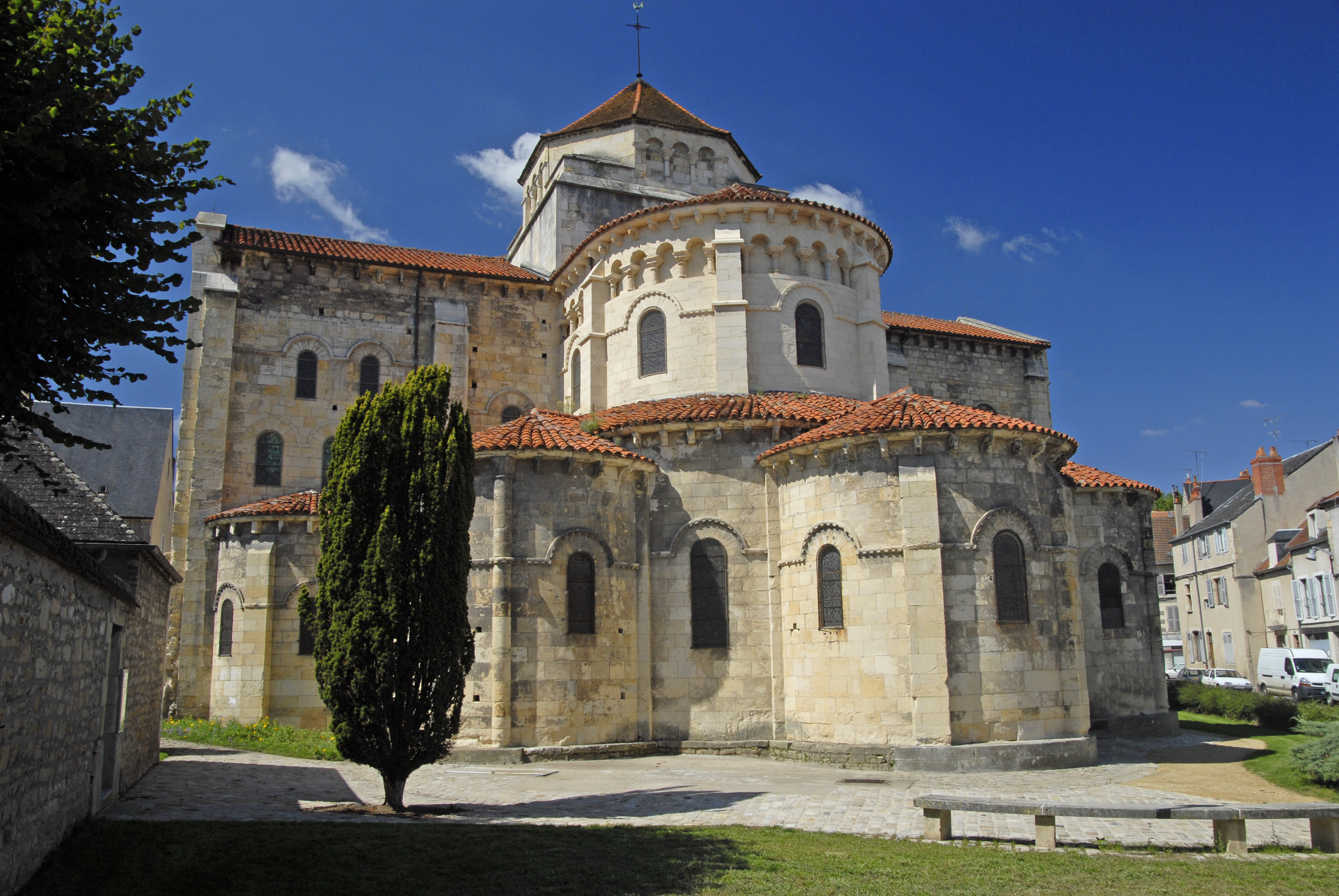
Saint-Étienne, Nevers, displays a round chancel with ambulatory, apsidal chapels and strongly projecting transepts.

=== Church and cathedral façades and external decoration ===
Romanesque church façades, generally to the west end of the building, are usually symmetrical, have a large central portal made significant by its mouldings or porch, and an arrangement of arched-topped windows. In Italy there is often a single central ocular or wheel window. The common decorative feature is arcading.

Smaller churches often have a single tower that is usually placed to the western end in France or England, either centrally or to one side, while larger churches and cathedrals often have two.

In France, Saint-Étienne, Caen, presents the model of a large French Romanesque façade. It is a symmetrical arrangement of nave flanked by two tall towers each with two buttresses of low flat profile that divide the façade into three vertical units. The lowest stage is marked by large doors, each set within an arch in each of the three vertical sections. The wider central section has two tiers of three identical windows, while in the outer sections there are two tiers of single windows, giving emphasis to the mass of the towers. The towers rise above the façade through three further tiers, the lowest of tall blind arcading, the next of arcading pierced by two narrow windows and the third of two large windows, divided into two lights by a colonnette.

This façade can be seen as the foundation for many other buildings, including both French and English Gothic churches. While the form is typical of northern France, its various components were common to many Romanesque churches of the period across Europe. Similar façades are found in Portugal. In England, Southwell Cathedral has maintained this form, despite the insertion of a huge Gothic window between the towers. Lincoln and Durham must once have looked like this. In Germany, Limburg Cathedral has a rich variety of openings and arcades in horizontal storeys of varying heights.

The churches of San Zeno Maggiore, Verona, and San Michele, Pavia, present two types of façade that are typical of Italian Romanesque, that which reveals the architectural form of the building, and that which screens it. At San Zeno, the components of nave and aisles are made clear by the vertical shafts that rise to the level of the central gable and by the varying roof levels. At San Miniato al Monte the definition of the architectural parts is made even clearer by the polychrome marble, a feature of many Italian medieval façades, particularly in Tuscany. At San Michele the vertical definition is present as at San Zeno, but the rooflines are screened behind a single large gable decorated with stepped arcading. At Santa Maria della Pieve, Arezzo, this screening is carried even further, as the roofline is horizontal and the arcading rises in many different levels while the colonettes that support them have a great diversity of decoration.

In the Rhineland and Netherlands the Carolingian form of west end known as the westwerk prevailed. Towers and apse of the western end are often incorporated into a multi-storey structure that bears little structural or visual relationship to the building behind it. These westwerks take a great variety of forms as may be seen at Maria Laach Abbey, St Gertrude, Nivelles, and St Serviatius, Maastricht.

Façades

The Old Cathedral of Coimbra, Portugal, is fortress-like and battlemented. The two central openings are deeply recessed.

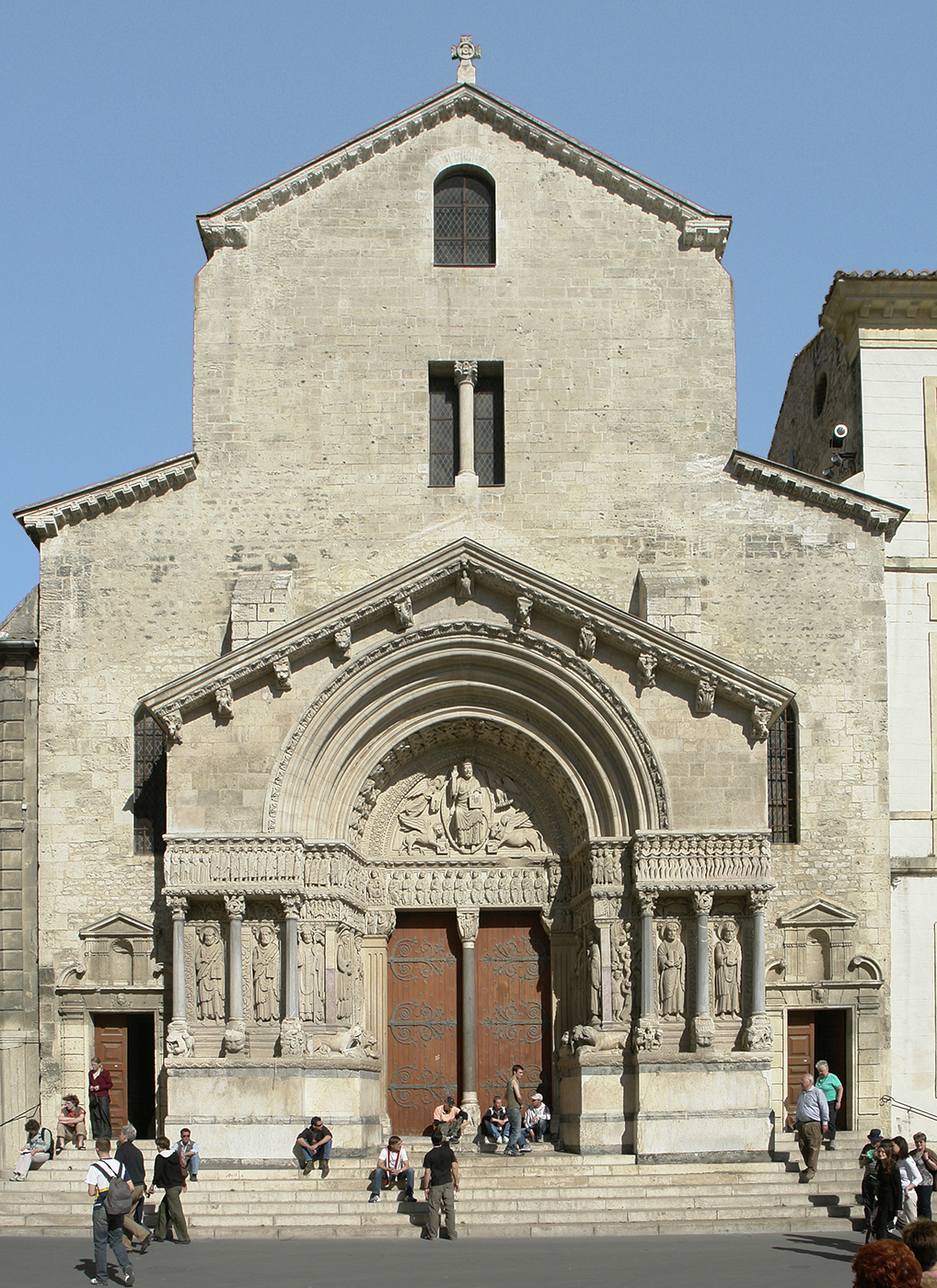
Church of St. Trophime, Arles, France. The ornamentation is focused on the porch and the carved Christ in Majesty on the tympanum, typical of French cathedrals.

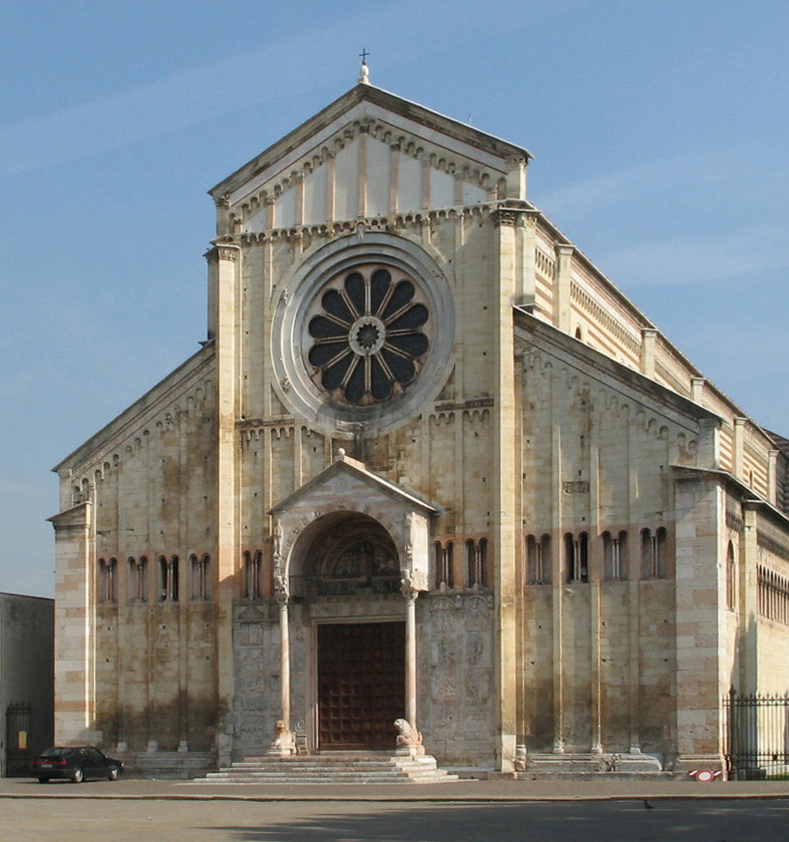
Church of San Zeno, Verona, Italy. The façade is neatly divided vertically and horizontally. The central wheel window and small porch with columns resting on crouching lions is typical of Italy.

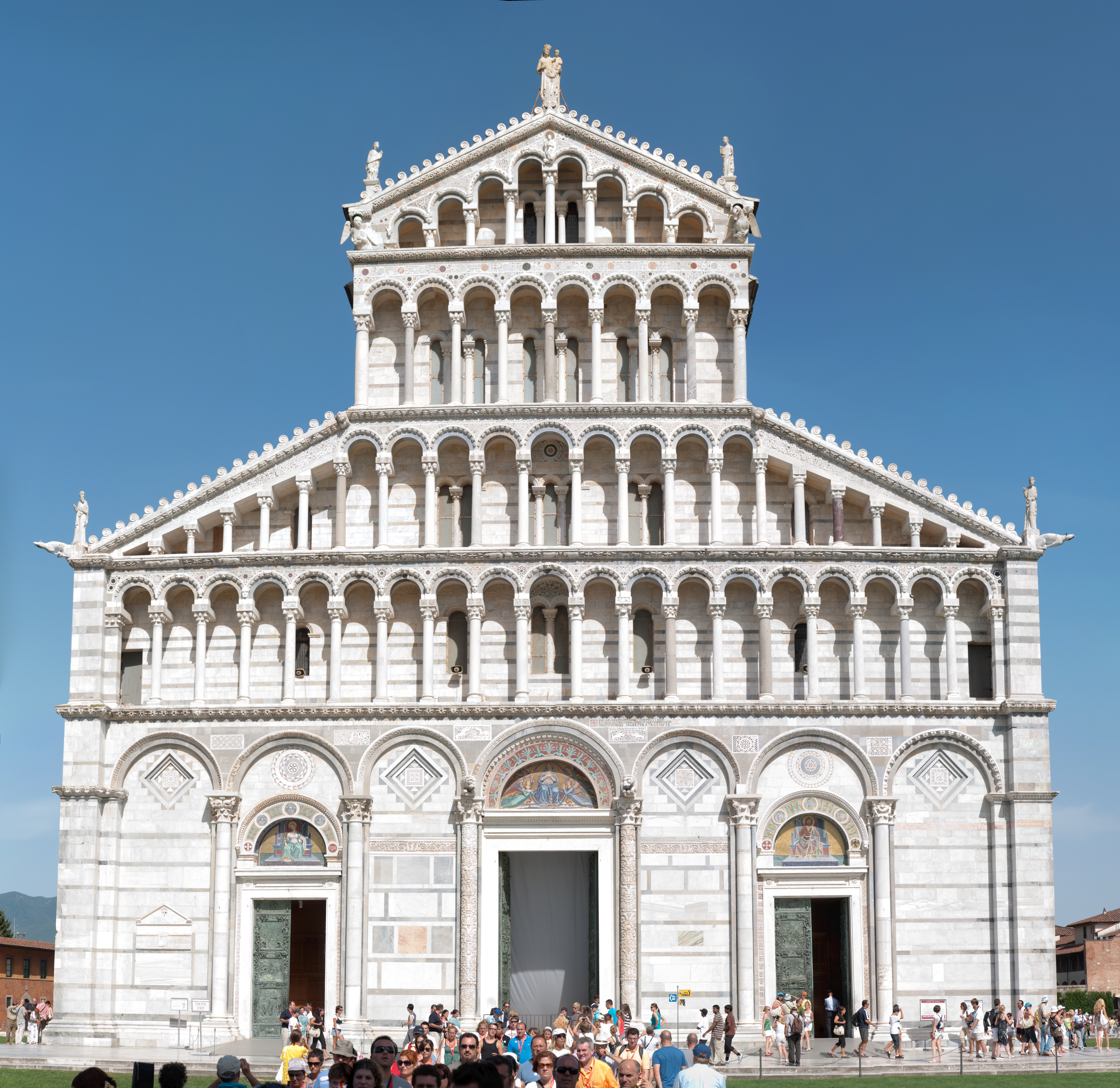
Pisa Cathedral, Italy. The entire building is faced with marble striped in white and grey. On the façade this pattern is overlaid with architectonic decoration of blind arcading below tiers of dwarf galleries. The three portals became increasingly common.

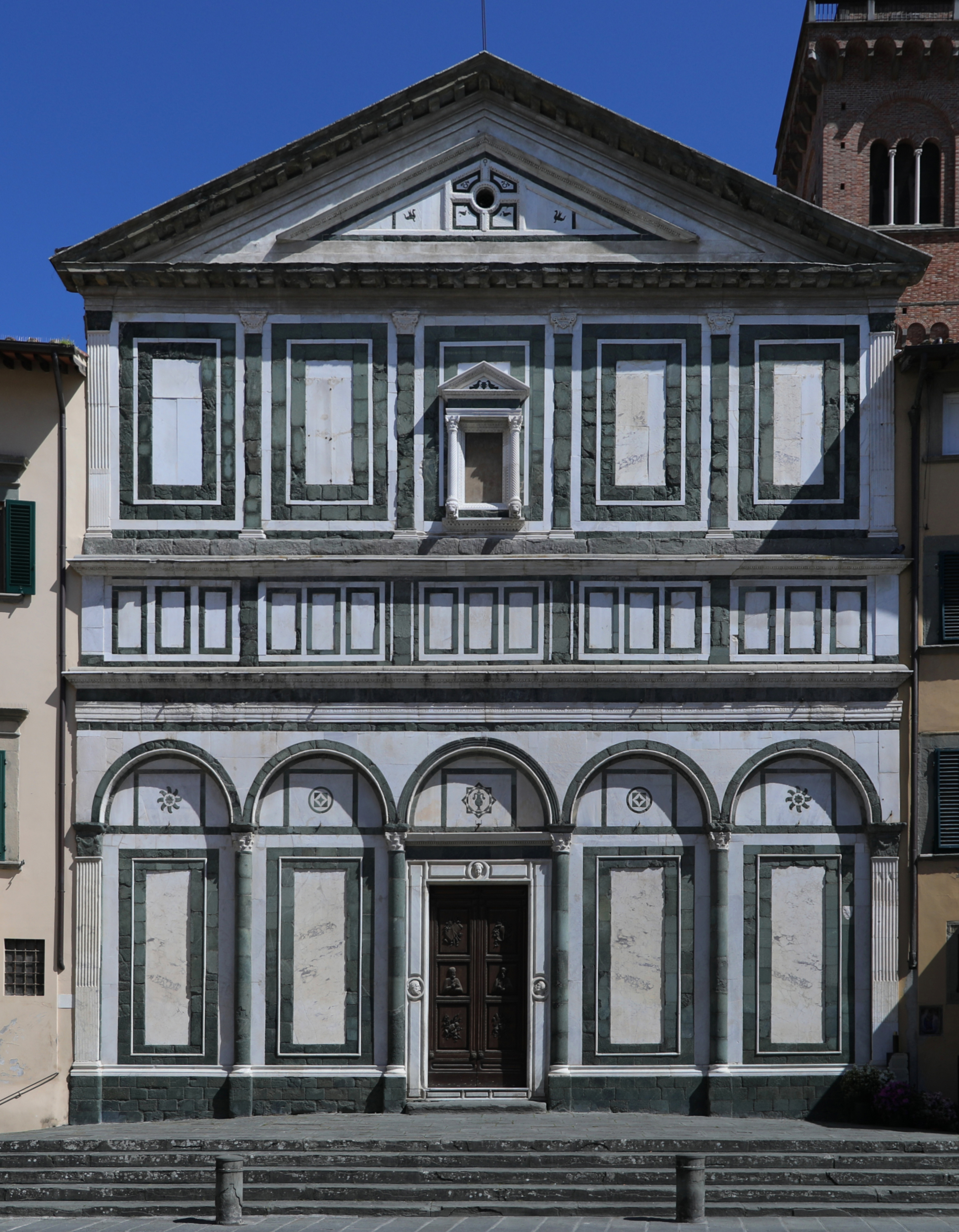
The Collegiate Church, Empoli, Italy, represents a screen façade. The polychrome marble decoration divides the façade into zones while giving little indication of the architectural form behind it.

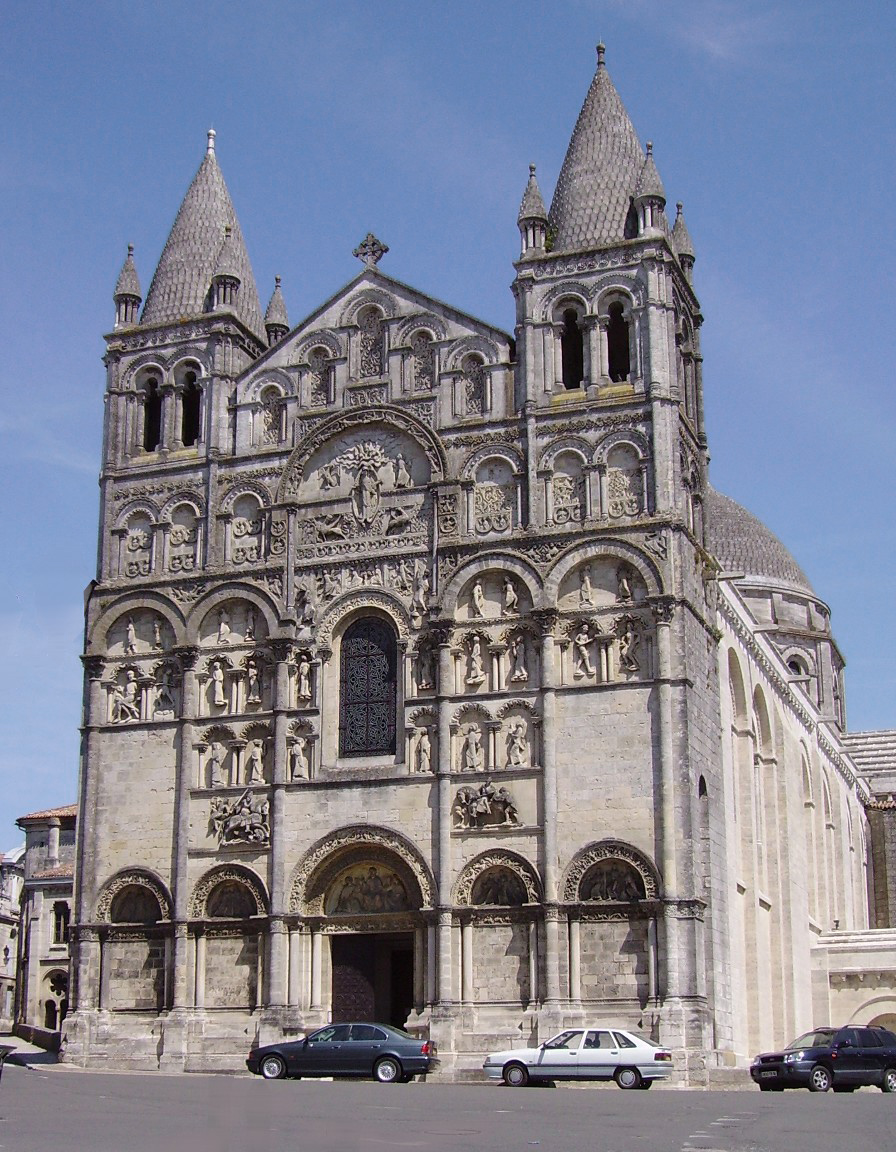
Angoulême Cathedral, France. The façade here, richly decorated with architectonic and sculptural forms, has much in common with that at Empoli in that it screens the form of the building behind it.

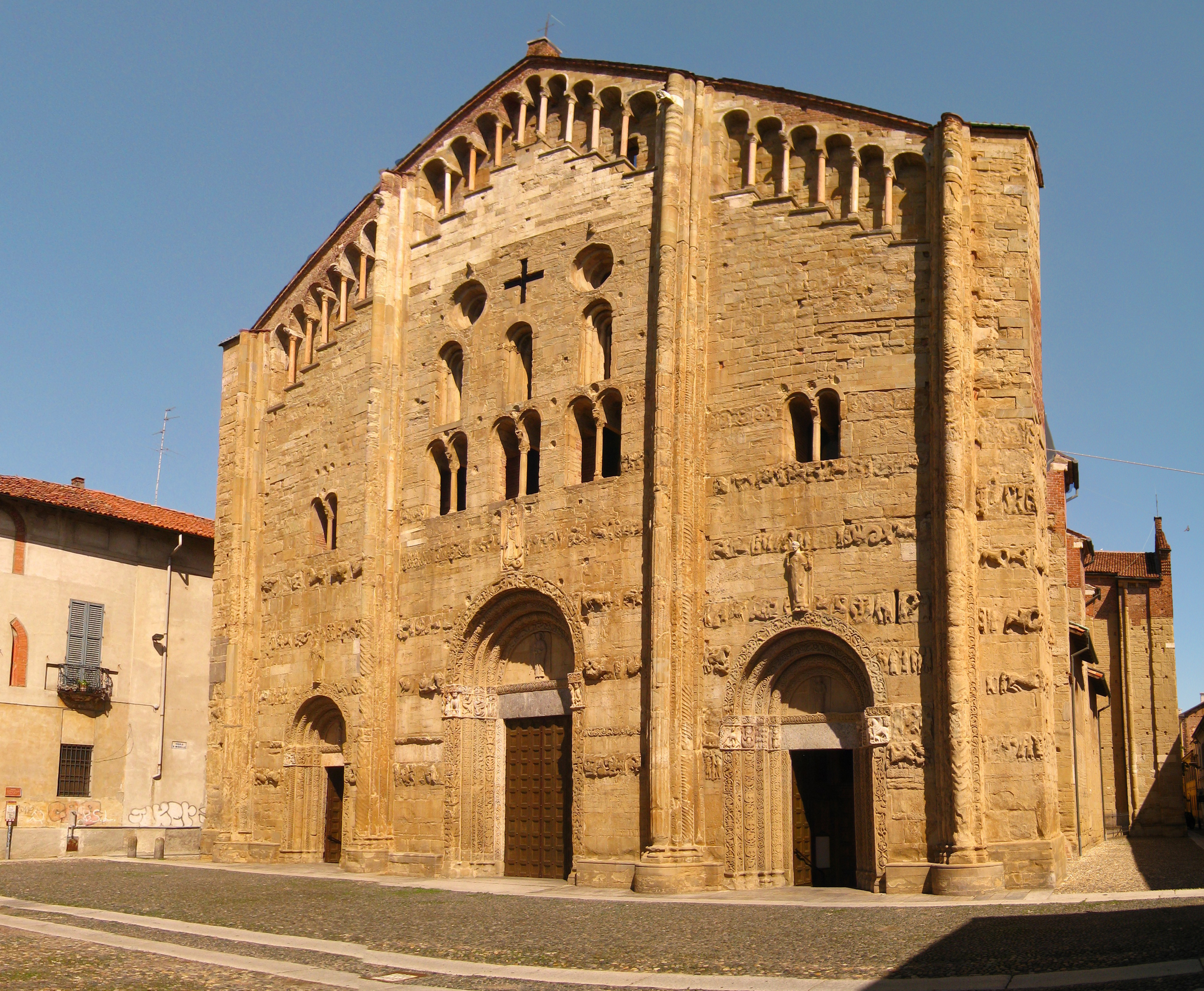
San Michele Maggiore, Pavia, The façade has the form of a screen, higher than the central nave, with a blind arcade below its roofline. It is divided into three bays by compound piers, has a variety of window openings, and horizontal bands of sculptural decoration.
Façades with towers

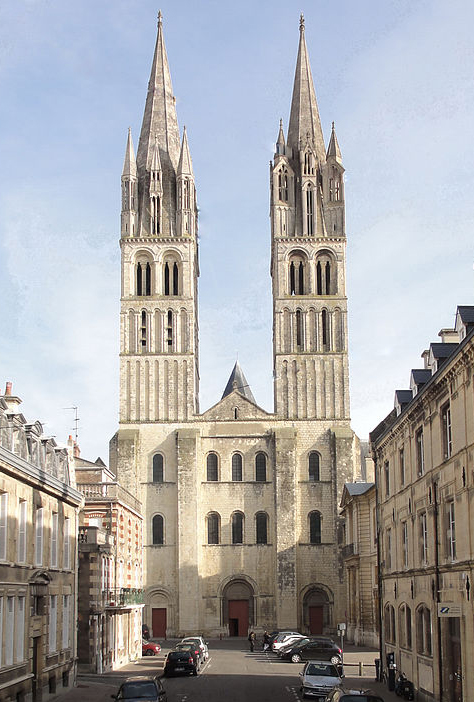
Saint-Étienne, Abbaye aux Hommes, Caen, France, 11th century, with its tall towers, three portals and neat definition of architectural forms became a model for the façades of many later cathedrals across Europe. 14th-century spires

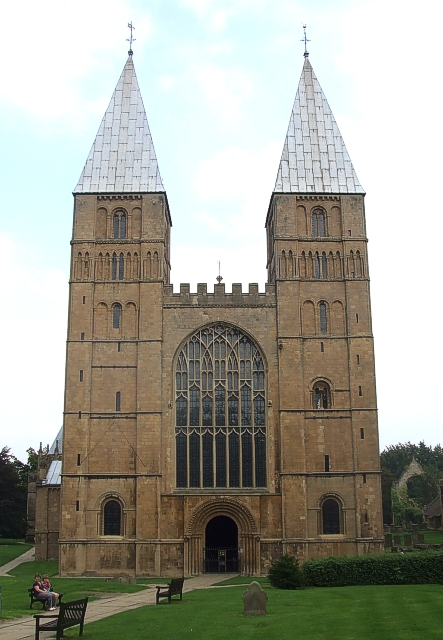
Southwell Cathedral, England, 1120, follows the Norman model with pyramidal spires as were probably at Saint-Étienne. The Perpendicular window and battlement are late Gothic.

Lisbon Cathedral, Portugal, 1147, has a similar form to the Old Cathedral of Coimbra above with the addition of two sturdy bell towers in the Norman manner and a wheel window

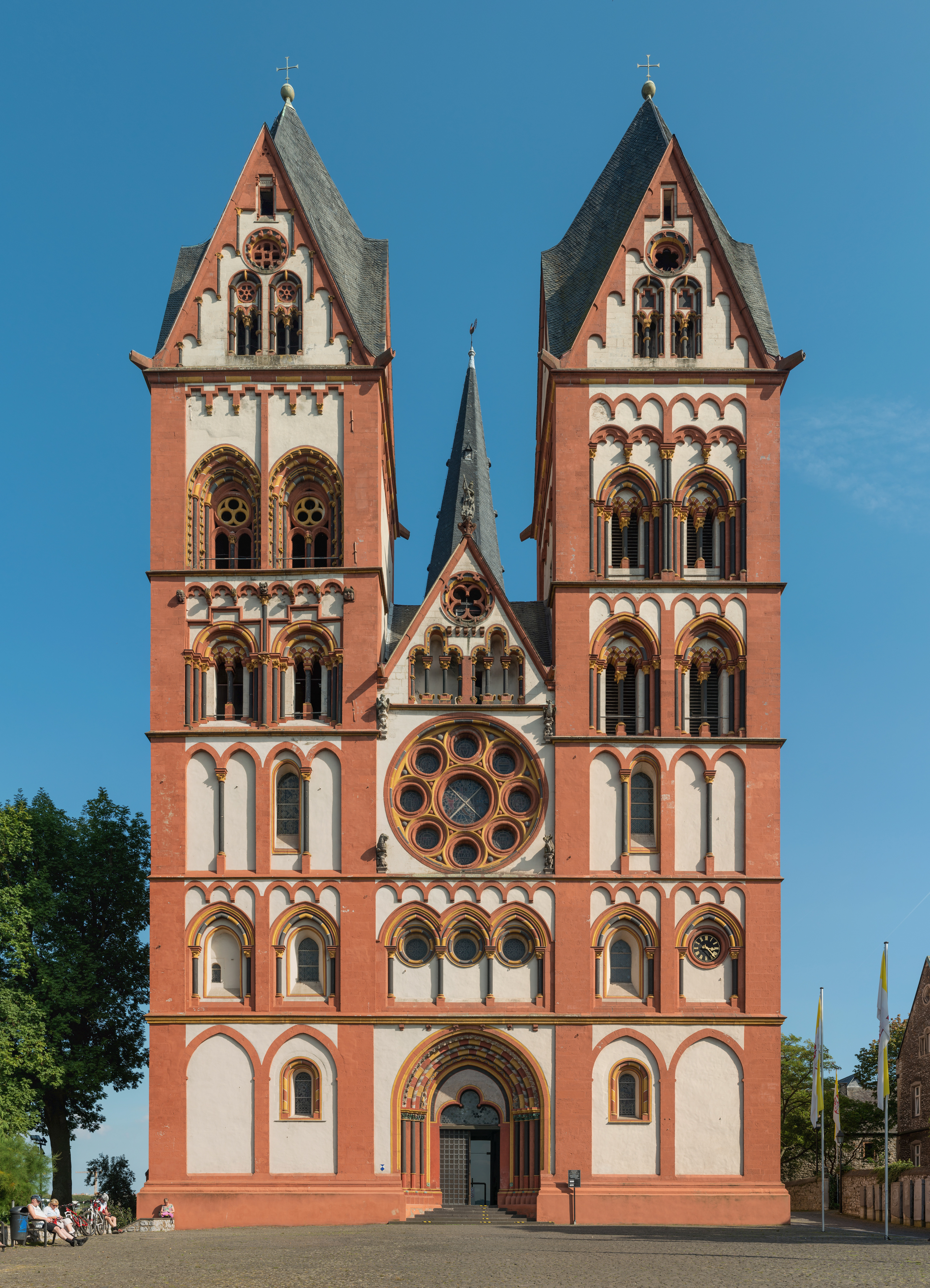
Limburg Cathedral, Germany. The façade, c. 1200, with polychrome plaster, follows the paired-tower model found at several Rhineland churches. The rose window has plate tracery and the spires are Rhenish helms.

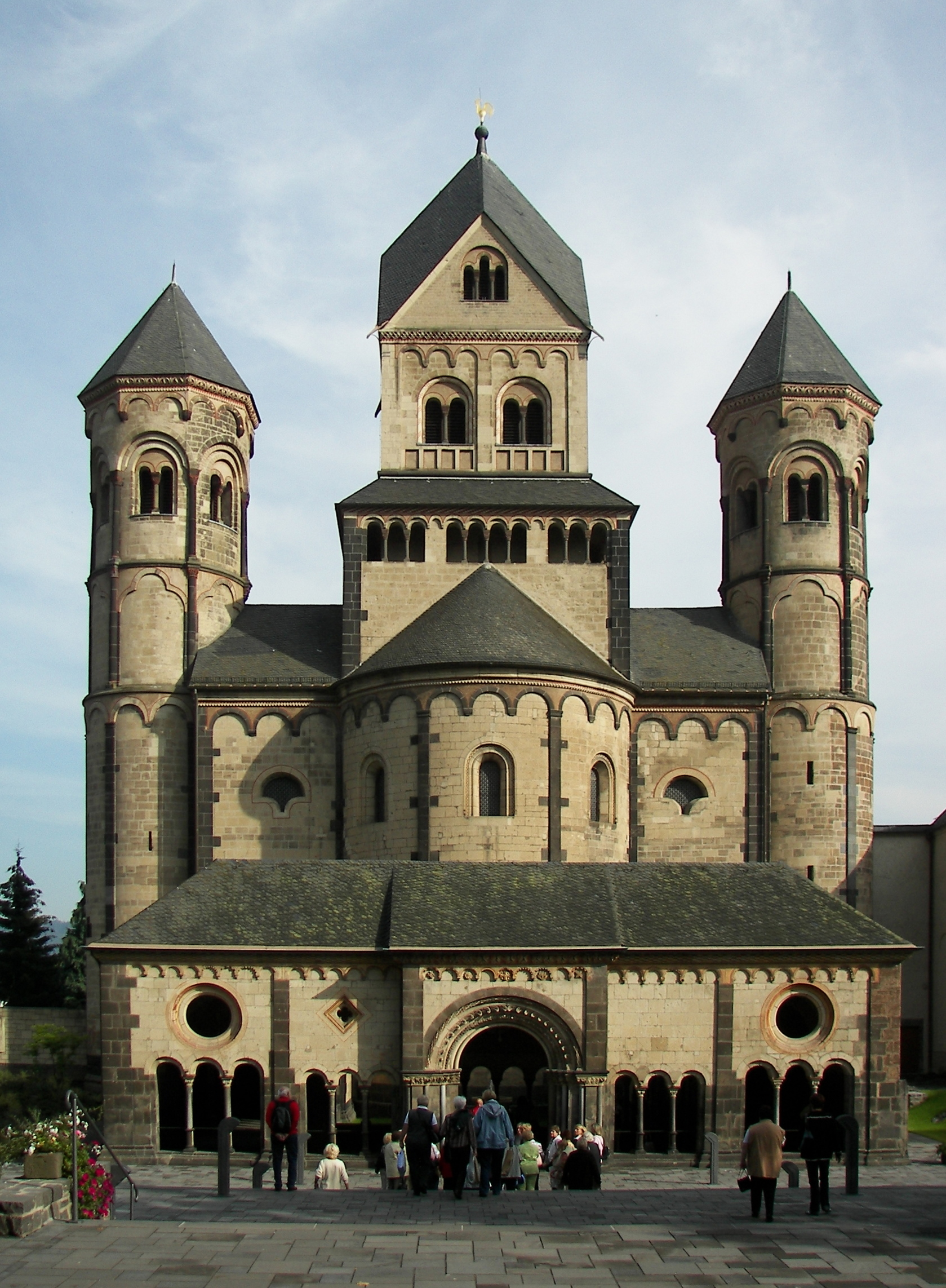
The westwork of the Maria Laach Abbey, Germany, 12th century, (porch 1225) is typical of Germany, a form that dates to Carolingian architecture with grouped towers of different plans and both "candle-snuffer" and Rhenish helm spires.

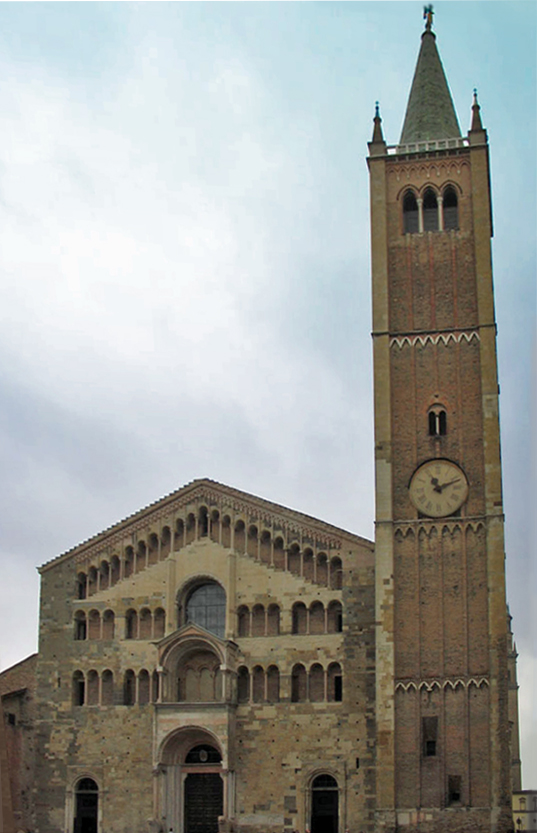
Parma Cathedral, Italy, 1178, has a screen façade ornamented with galleries. At the centre is an open porch surmounted by a ceremonial balcony. The tower, (Gothic 1284) is a separate structure as usual in Italy.

=== Church towers ===
Towers were an important feature of Romanesque churches and a great number of them are still standing. They take a variety of forms: square, circular and octagonal, and are positioned differently in relation to the church building in different countries. In northern France, two large towers, such as those at Caen, were to become an integral part of the façade of any large abbey or cathedral. In central and southern France this is more variable and large churches may have one tower or a central tower. Large churches of Spain and Portugal usually have two towers.

Many abbeys of France, such as that at Cluny, had many towers of varied forms. This is also common in Germany, where the apses were sometimes framed with circular towers and the crossing surmounted by an octagonal tower as at Worms Cathedral. Large paired towers of square plan could also occur on the transept ends, such as those at Tournai Cathedral in Belgium. In Germany, where four towers frequently occur, they often have spires that may be four or eight sided, or the distinctive Rhenish helm shape seen on the cathedrals of Limburg or Speyer.

In England, for large abbeys and cathedral buildings, three towers were favoured, with the central tower being the tallest. This was often not achieved, through the slow process of the building stages, and in many cases the upper parts of the tower were not completed until centuries later as at Durham and Lincoln. Large Norman towers exist at the cathedrals of Durham, Exeter, Southwell, Norwich and Tewkesbury Abbey. Such towers were often topped during the late medieval period with a Gothic spire of wooden construction covered with lead, copper or shingles. In the case of Norwich Cathedral, the huge, ornate, 12th-century crossing-tower received a 15th-century masonry spire rising to a height of 320 feet and remaining to this day.

In Italy towers are almost always free standing and the position is often dictated by the landform of the site, rather than aesthetics. This is the case in nearly all Italian churches both large and small, except in Sicily where a number of churches were founded by the Norman rulers and are more French in appearance.

As a general rule, large Romanesque towers are square with corner buttresses of low profile, rising without diminishing through the various stages. Towers are usually marked into clearly defined stages by horizontal courses. As the towers rise, the number and size of openings increases as can be seen on the right tower of the transept of Tournai Cathedral where two narrow slits in the fourth level from the top becomes a single window, then two windows, then three windows at the uppermost level. This sort of arrangement is particularly noticeable on the towers of Italian churches, which are usually built of brick and may have no other ornament. Two fine examples occur at Lucca, at the church of San Frediano and at the Duomo. It is also seen in Spain.

In Italy there are a number of large free-standing towers that are circular, the most famous of these being the Leaning Tower of Pisa. In other countries where circular towers occur, such as Germany, they are usually paired and often flank an apse. Circular towers are uncommon in England, but occur throughout the early medieval period in Ireland.

Polygonal towers were often used on crossings and occur in France, Germany, Italy and Spain such as that of the Old Cathedral, Salamanca, which is covered by a dome supported on a ribbed vault.

Smaller churches sometimes had bell-gables instead of towers, a feature which, according to some authors, is characteristic of the simplicity of much architecture in the Romanesque style.

Towers

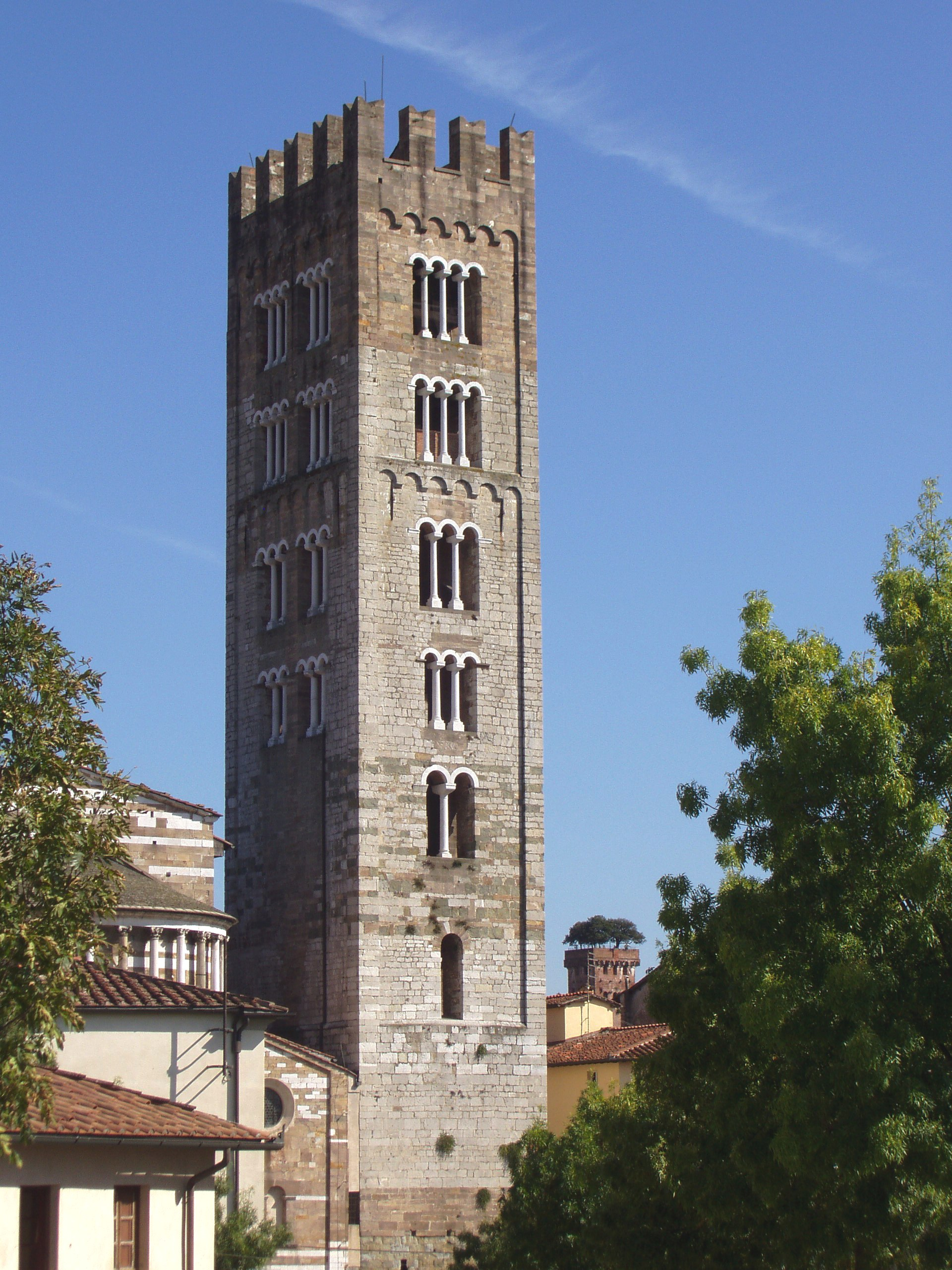
The tower of the Basilica of San Frediano, Lucca, has openings that graduate in number, typical of Italian and Spanish Romanesque campanile. (See pic. San Esteban, Segovia, below)

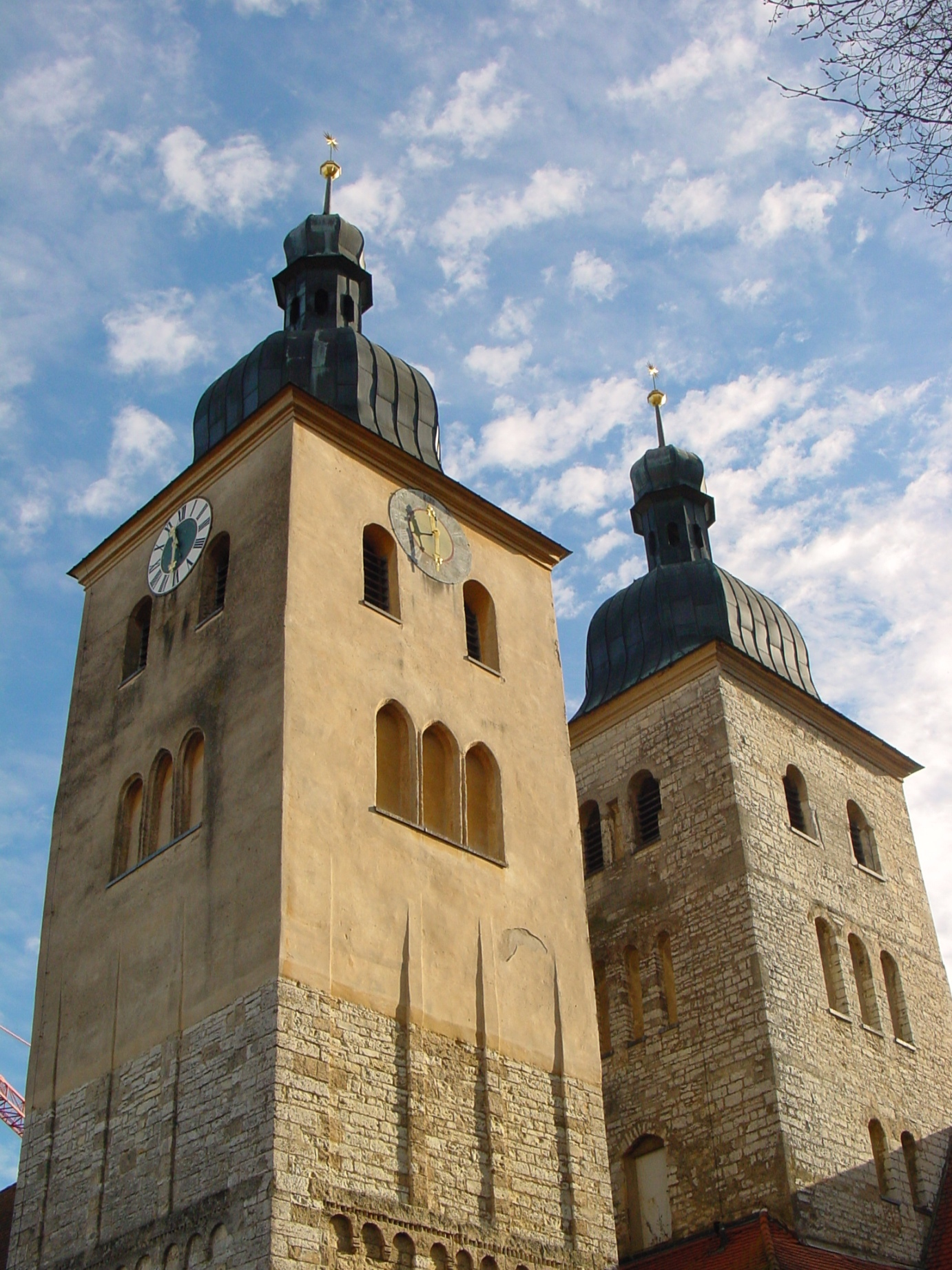
Paired towers such as those of Plankstetten Abbey, are a typical feature of Bavarian and Central European church architecture. (See image of Abbey Church of St James, Lébény, above)

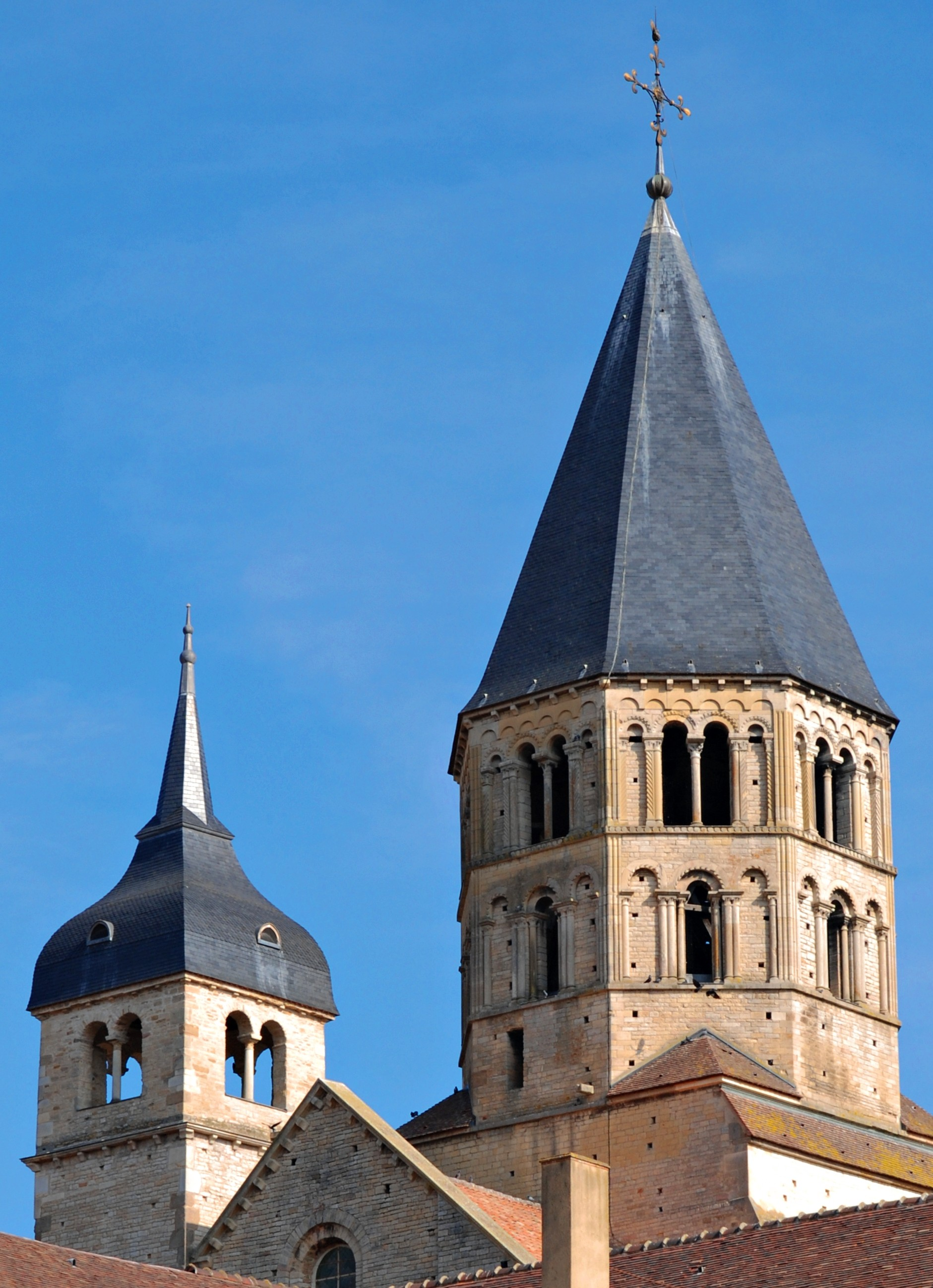
The octagonal crossing tower of the Abbey church at Cluny influenced the building of other polygonal crossing towers in France, Spain and Germany. (See pic. Maria Laach Abbey, above)

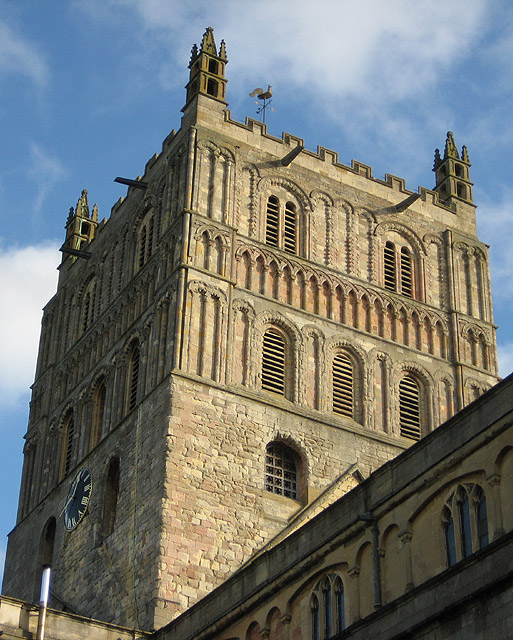
The most massive Romanesque crossing tower is that at Tewkesbury Abbey, in England, where large crossing towers are characteristic. (See pic. St Alban's Cathedral, above)

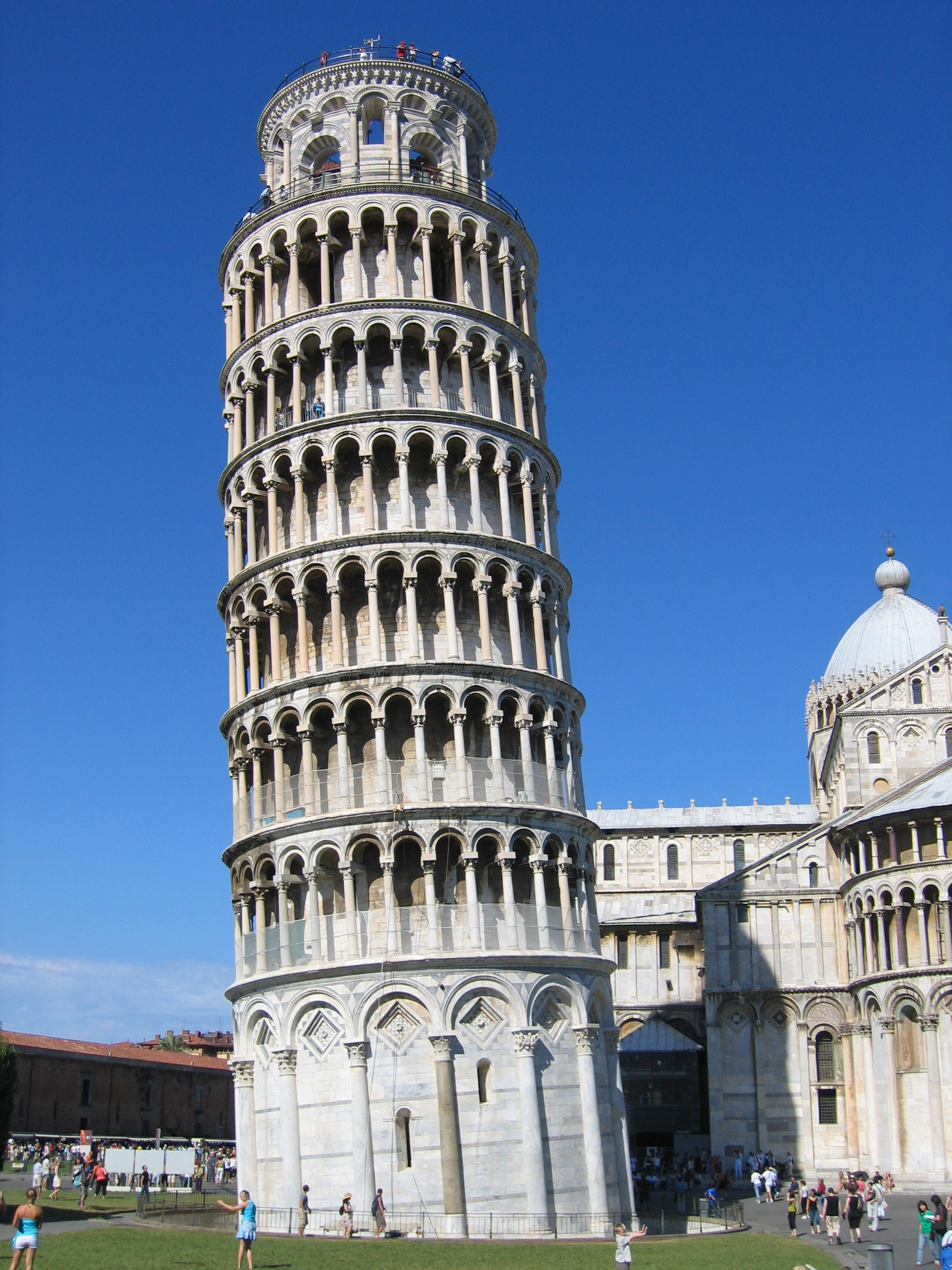
The Leaning Tower of Pisa with its encircling arcades is the best known (and most richly decorated) of the many circular towers found in Italy.

=== Portals ===
Romanesque churches generally have a single portal centrally placed on the west front, the focus of decoration for the façade of the building. Some churches such as Saint-Étienne, Caen, (11th century) and Pisa Cathedral (late 12th century) had three western portals, in the manner of Early Christian basilicas. Many churches, both large and small, had lateral entrances that were commonly used by worshippers.

Romanesque doorways have a character form, with the jambs having a series of receding planes, into each of which is set a circular shaft, all surmounted by a continuous abacus. The semi-circular arch which rises from the abacus has the same series planes and circular mouldings as the jambs. There are typically four planes containing three shafts, but there may be as many as twelve shafts, symbolic of the apostles.

The opening of the portal may be arched, or may be set with a lintel supporting a tympanum, generally carved, but in Italy sometimes decorated with mosaic or fresco. A carved tympanum generally constitutes the major sculptural work of a Romanesque church. The subject of the carving on a major portal may be Christ in Majesty or the Last Judgement. Lateral doors may include other subjects such as the Birth of Christ. The portal may be protected by a porch, with simple open porches being typical of Italy, and more elaborate structures typical of France and Spain.

Portals

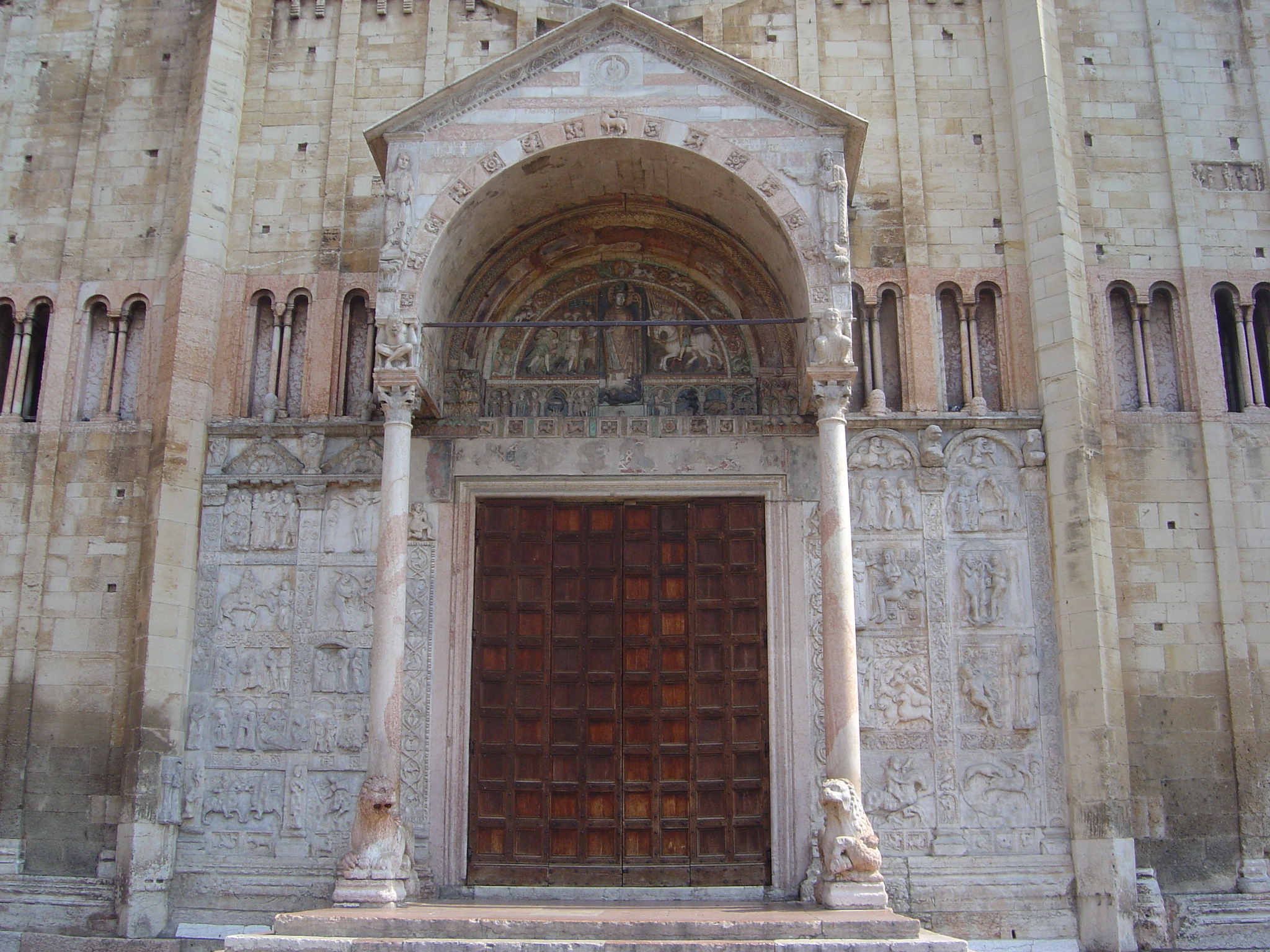
San Zeno, Verona, has a porch typical of Italy. The square-topped doorway is surmounted by a mosaic. To either side are marble reliefs showing the Fall of Man and the Life of Christ.

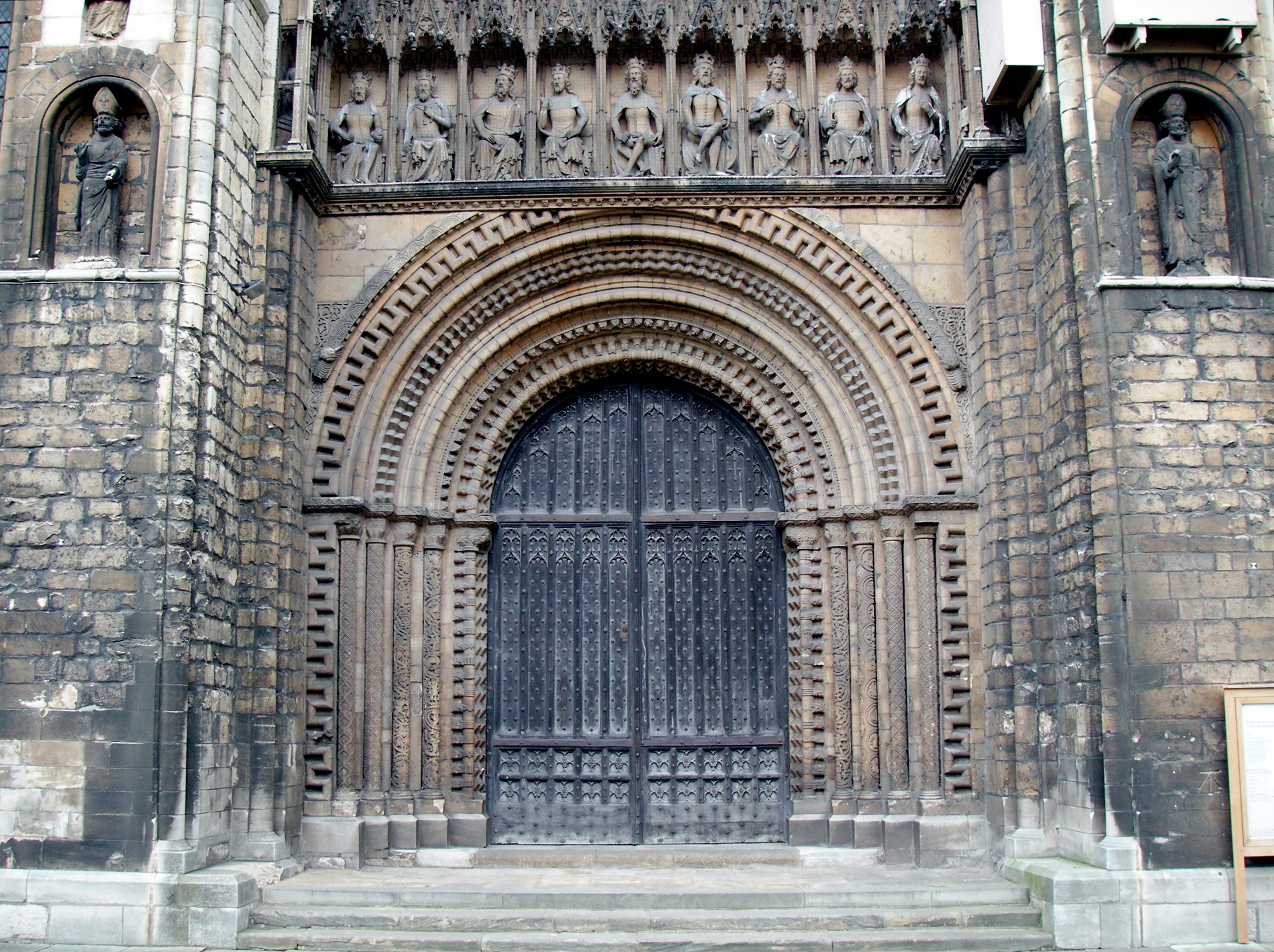
The mouldings of the arched central west door of Lincoln Cathedral are decorated by chevrons and other formal and figurative ornament typical of English Norman. The "Gallery of Kings" above the portal is Gothic

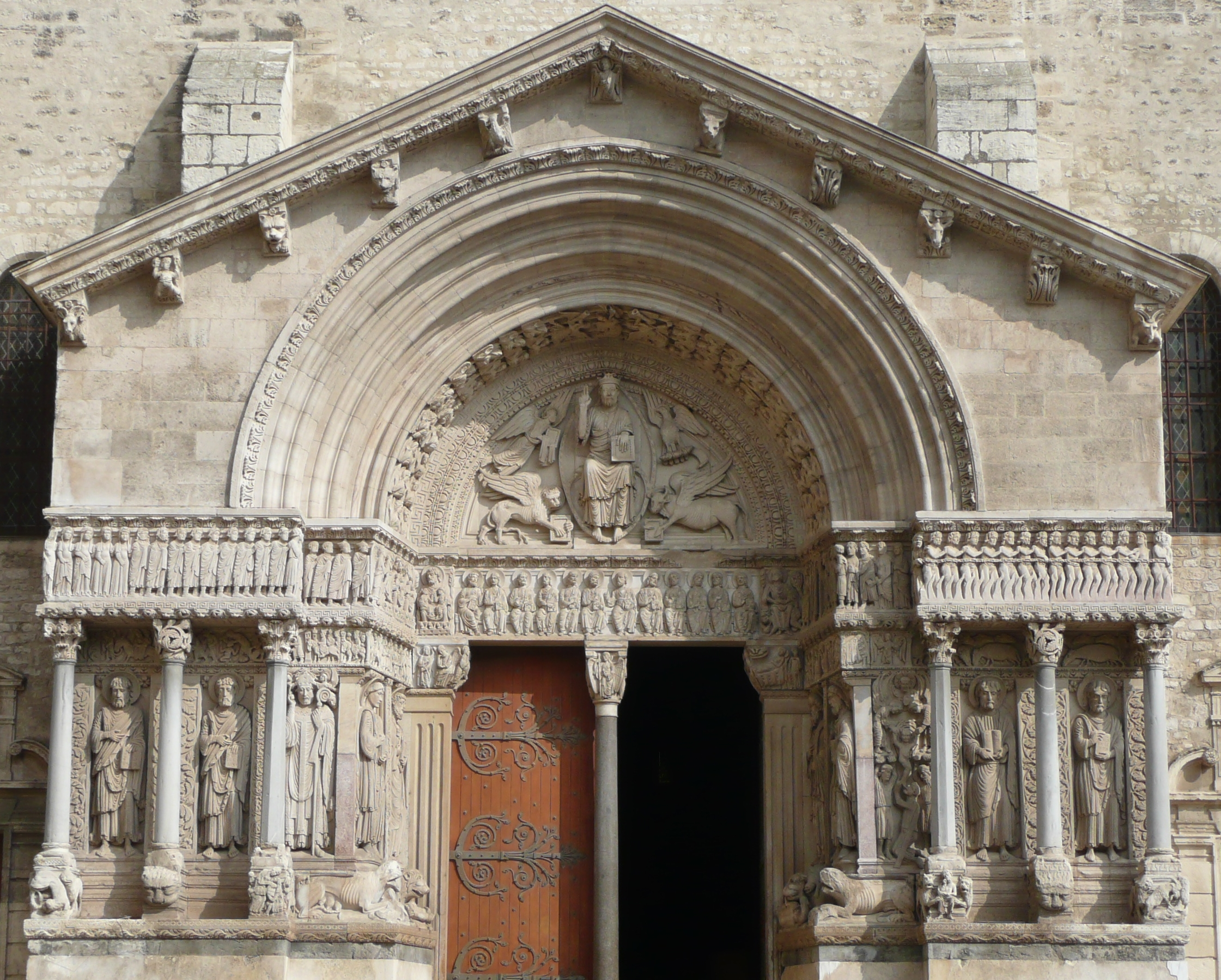
The Basilica of Saint-Trophime, Arles, France, has an elaborate sculptural scheme which includes Christ in Majesty, a frieze extending over the lintel and a gallery of sculptured figures.

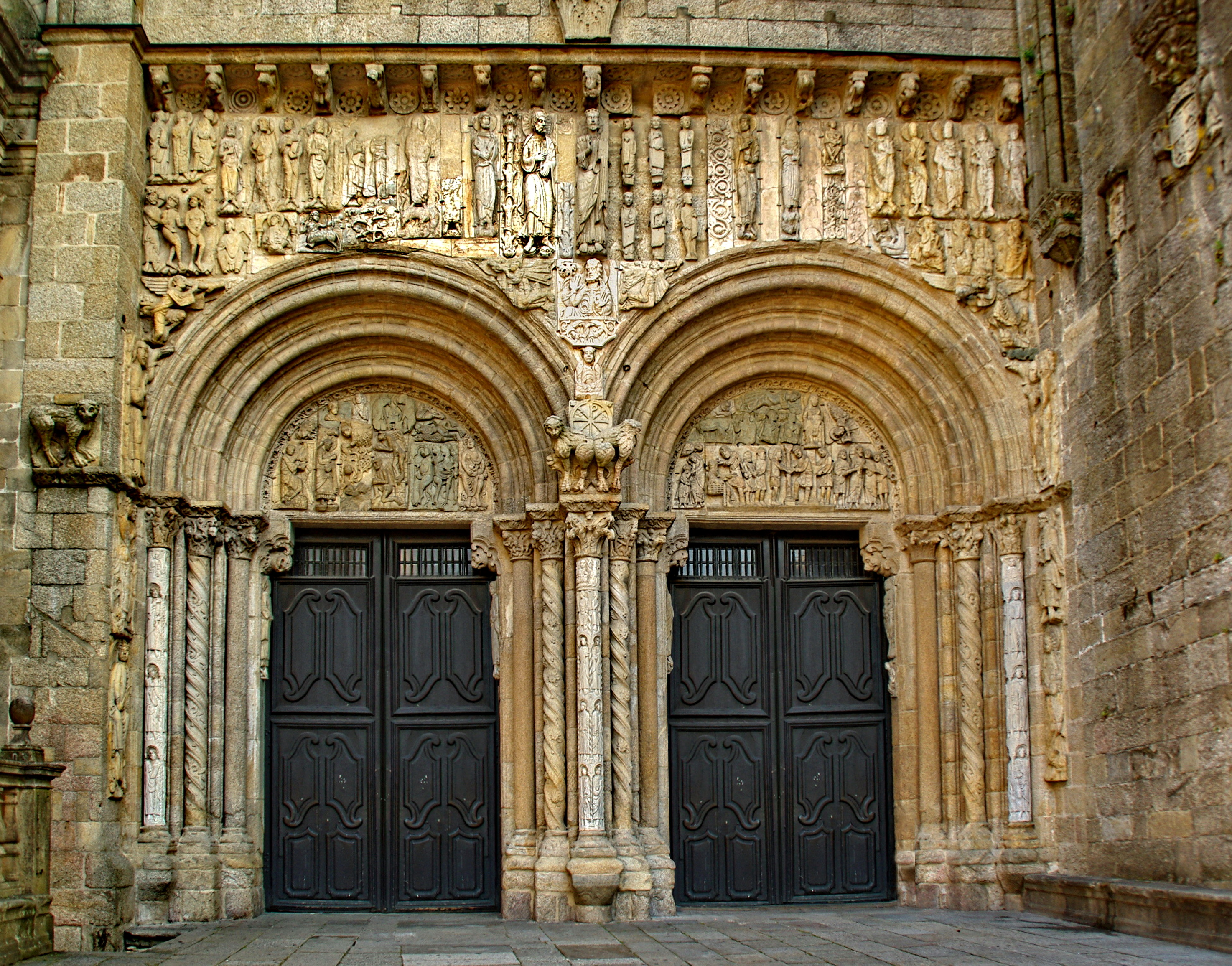
The Porta de Praterías, Cathedral of Santiago de Compostela, by Master Esteban, has two wide openings with tympanums supported on brackets. The sculptured frieze above is protected by an eave on corbels.

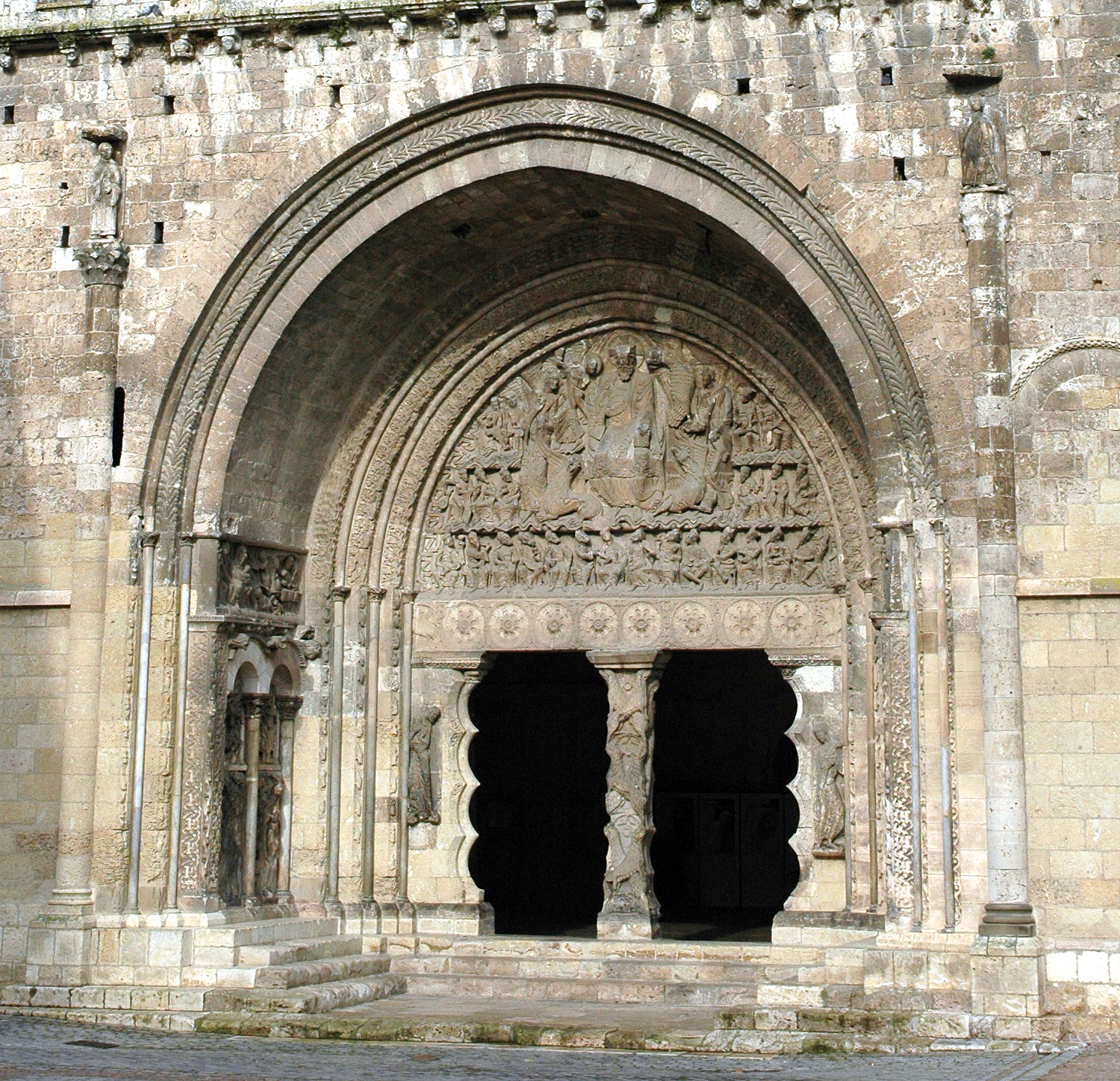
The portal of Saint-Pierre, Moissac, has unusual features including the frieze of roundels on the lintel, the scalloped jambs and figures of prophets on the central jamb.

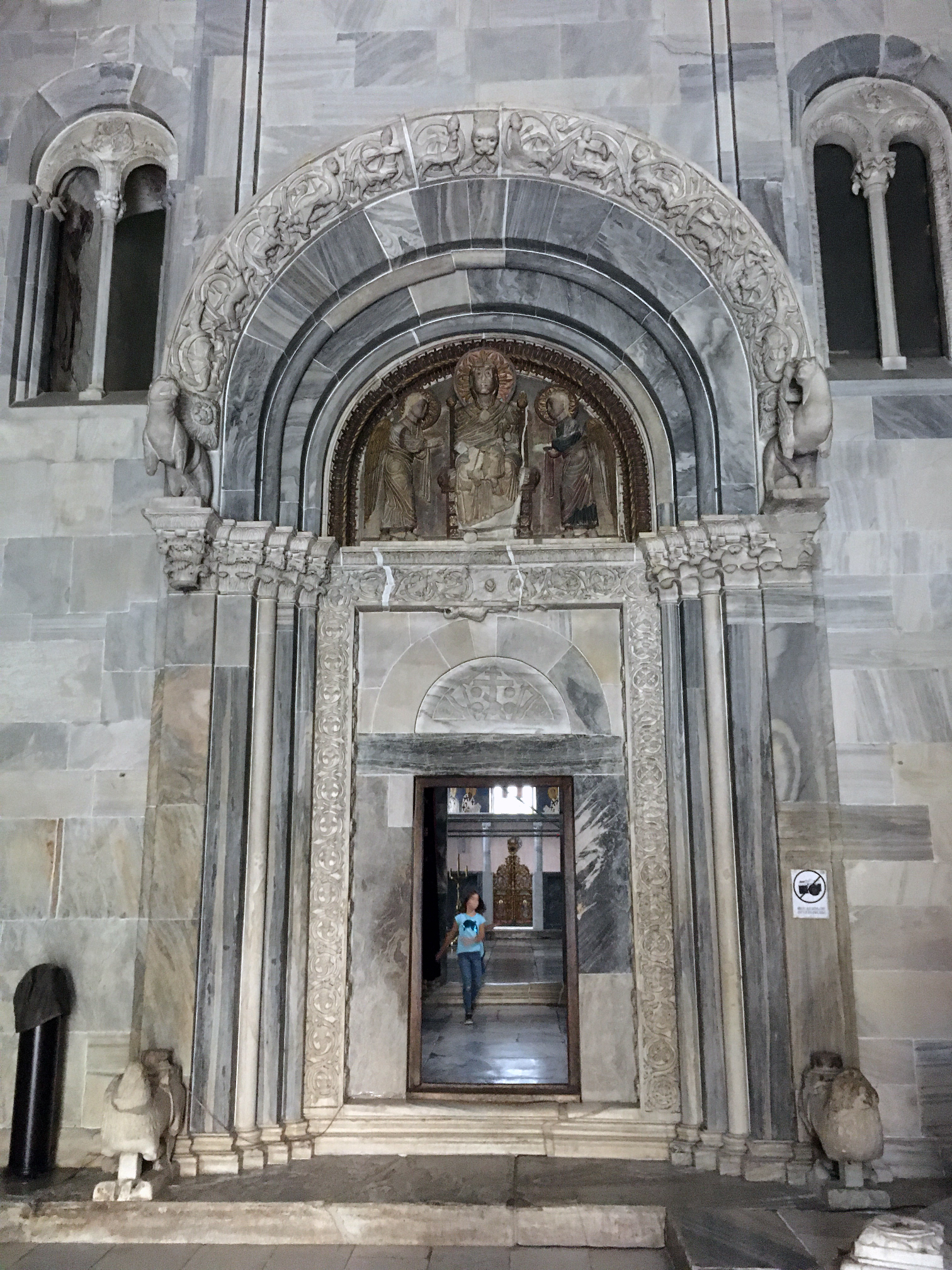
The portal of Studenica Monastery, Serbia. In the Serbian Raška architectural style, it's common the use of narrowed portals.

=== Interiors ===
The structure of large churches differed regionally and developed across the centuries. The use of piers of rectangular plan to support arcades was common, as at Mainz Cathedral and St Gertrude Nivelle, and remained usual in smaller churches across Europe, with the arcades often taking the form of openings through the surface of a wall. In Italy, where there was a strong tradition of using marble columns, complete with capital, base and abacus, this remained prevalent, often reusing existent ancient columns, as at San Miniato al Monte.

A number of 11th-century churches have naves distinguished by huge circular columns with no clerestory, or a very small one as at St Philibert, Tournus. In England stout columns of large diameter supported decorated arches, gallery and clerestory, as at the nave of Malmesbury Abbey (see "Piers and columns", above). By the early 12th century composite piers had evolved, in which the attached shafts swept upward to a ribbed vault or were continued into the mouldings of the arcade, as at Vézelay Abbey, Saint-Étienne, Caen, and Peterborough Cathedral.

The nature of the internal roofing varied greatly, from open timber roofs, and wooden ceilings of different types, which remained common in smaller churches, to simple barrel vaults and groin vaults and increasingly to the use of ribbed vaults in the late 11th and 12th centuries, which were to become a common feature of larger abbey churches and cathedrals. A number of Romanesque churches are roofed with a series of Domes. At Fontevrault Abbey the nave is covered by four domes, while at the Church of Saint Front, Périgueux, the church is of Greek cross plan, with a central dome surrounded by four smaller domes over the nave, chancel and transepts.

Internal decoration varied across Europe. Where wide expanses of wall existed, they were often plastered and painted. Wooden ceilings and timber beams were decorated. In Italy walls were sometimes faced with polychrome marble. Where buildings were constructed of stone that was suitable for carving, many decorative details occur, including ornate capitals and mouldings.

The apsidal east end was often a focus of decoration, with both architectonic forms such as arcading and pictorial features such as carved figures, murals and occasionally mosaics. Stained glass came into increasing use from the 11th century. In many churches the eastern end has been rebuilt in a later style. Of England's Norman cathedrals, no eastern end remains unchanged. In France the eastern terminals of the important abbeys of Caen, Vézelay and, most significantly, the Basilica of St Denis were completely rebuilt in the Gothic style. In Germany, major reconstructions of the 19th century sought to return many Romanesque buildings to their original form. Examples of simple Romanesque apses can be seen in the images of St Gertrude, Nivelles; St Philibert, Tournus, and San Miniato al Monte.

Interiors (see also sections illustrating columns and roofs)

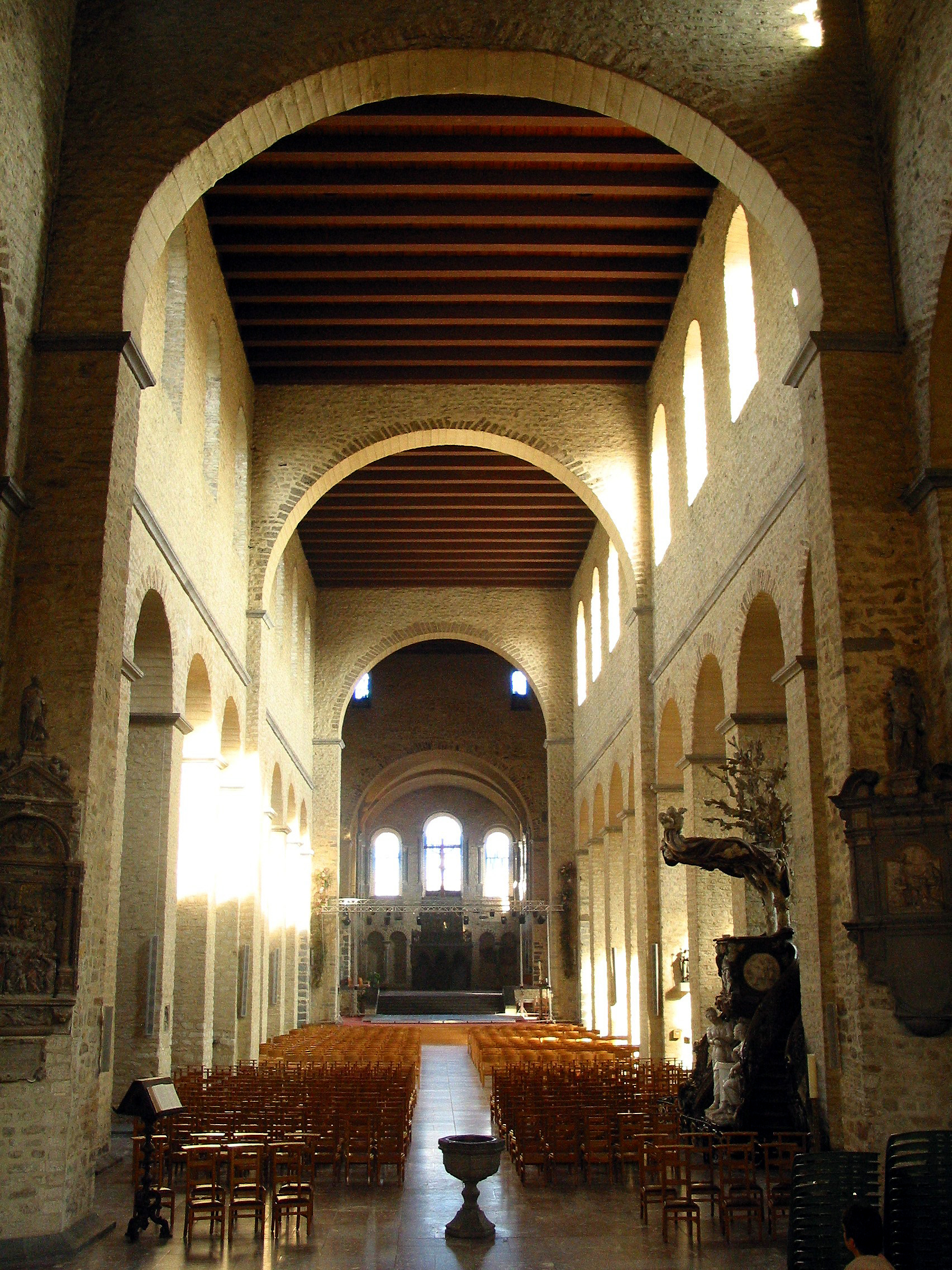
St Gertrude, Nivelles, Belgium, (consecrated 1046) has a nave and aisles divided by piers supporting a clerestorey. The nave is divided by transverse arches. The interior would have been plastered and painted.

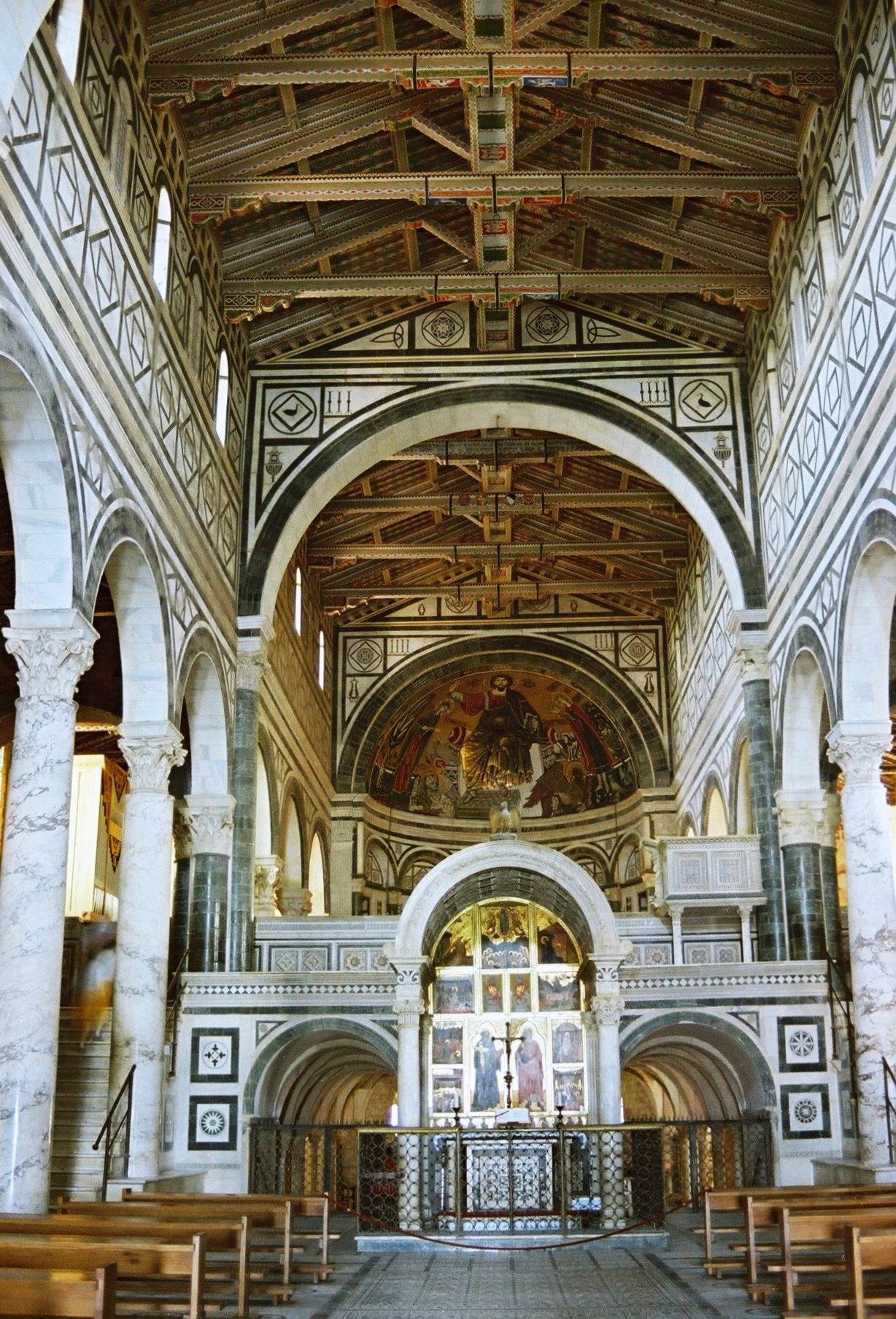
San Miniato al Monte, Florence (1013–1090) has basilical form, open timber roof and decoration of polychrome marble and mosaic. The decoration continued harmoniously until the apsidal mosaic of 1260.

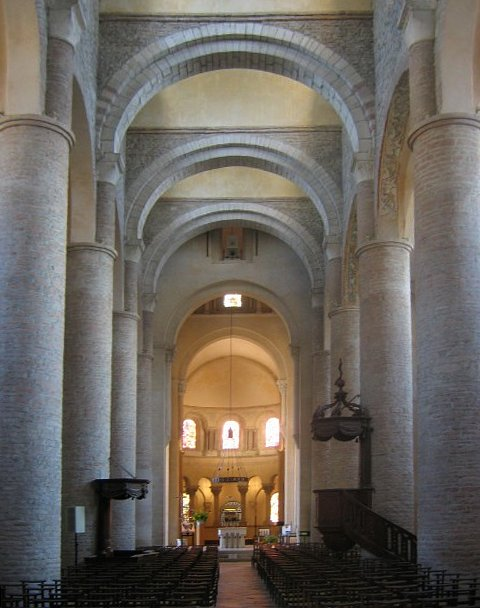
The Church of St Philibert, Tournus, (990–1019) has tall circular piers supporting the arcade and is roofed with a series of barrel vaults supported on arches. Small clerestory windows light the vault.

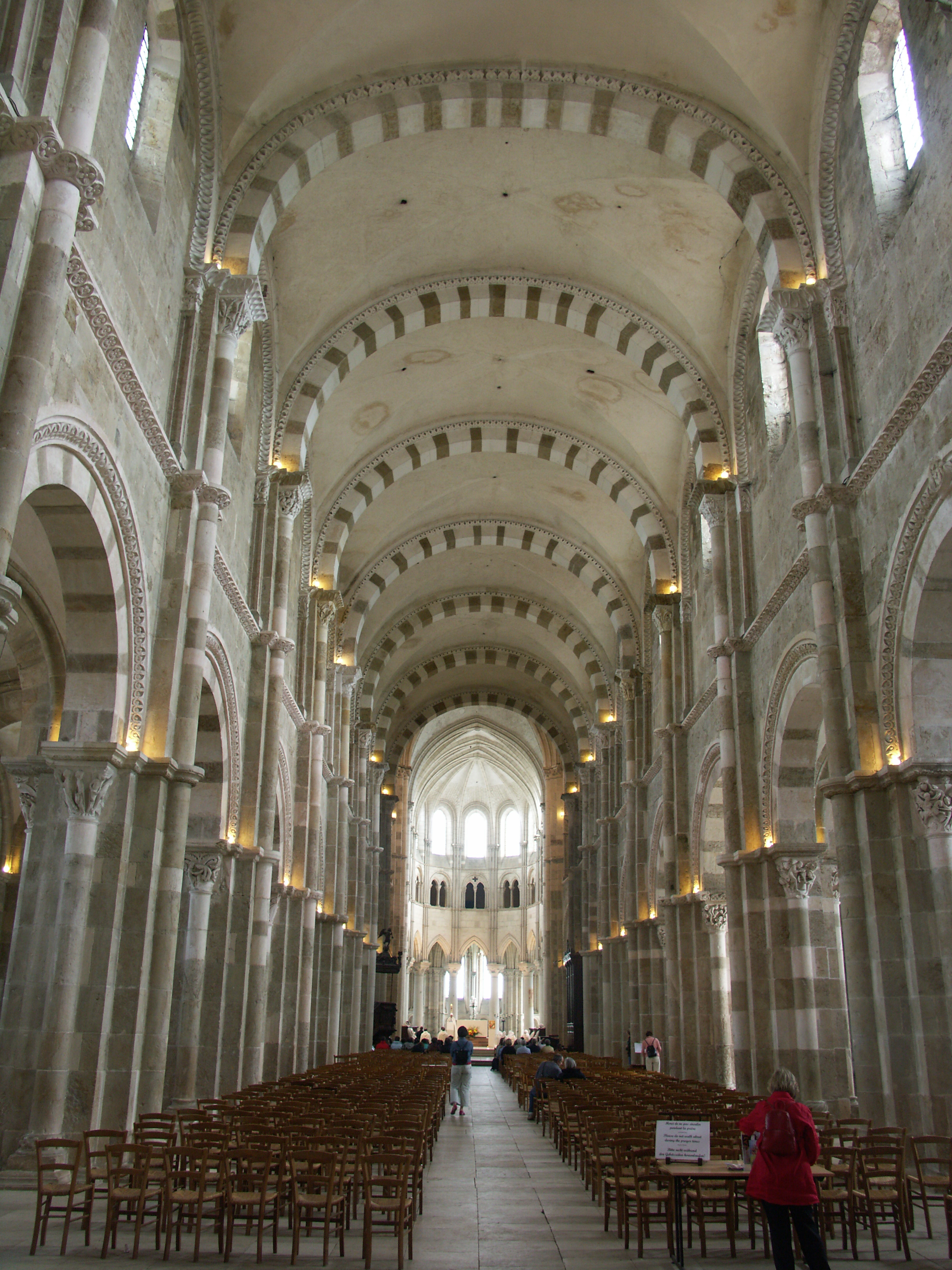
Abbey of St Mary Magdalene, Vézelay, (consecrated 1104) has clusters of vertical shafts rising to support transverse arches and a groin vault. The dressed polychrome stonework has exquisitely detailed mouldings. East end is Gothic.

The nave of Peterborough Cathedral (1118–1193) in three stages of arcade, gallery & clerestory, typical of Norman abbey churches. The rare wooden ceiling retains its original decoration (c. 1230). Gothic arches beneath tower (c. 1350).

=== Other structures ===
Among the structures associated with church buildings are crypts, porches, chapter houses, cloisters and baptisteries.

Crypts are often present as an underlying structure to a substantial church, and are generally a completely discrete space, but occasionally, as in some Italian churches, may be a sunken space under a raised chancel and open, via steps, to the body of the nave. Romanesque crypts have survived in many instances, such as Canterbury Cathedral, when the church itself has been rebuilt. The usual construction of a Romanesque crypt is with many short stout columns carrying groin vaults, as at Worcester Cathedral.

Porches sometimes occur as part of the original design of a façade. This is very much the case in Italy, where they are usually only one bay deep and are supported on two columns, often resting on couchant lions, as at St Zeno, Verona.See above. Elsewhere, porches of various dates have been added to the façade or side entrance of existent churches and may be quite a substantial structure, with several bays of vaulting supported on an open or partially open arcade, and forming a sort of narthex as at the Church of St Maria, Laach.See above In Spain, Romanesque churches often have large lateral porches, like loggias.

Chapter houses often occur adjacent to monastic or cathedral churches. Few have survived intact from the Romanesque period. Early chapter houses were rectangular in shape, with the larger ones sometimes having groin or ribbed vaults supported on columns. Later Romanesque chapter houses sometimes had an apsidal eastern end. The chapter house at Durham Cathedral is a wide space with a ribbed vault, restored as originally constructed in 1130. The circular chapter house at Worcester Cathedral, built by Bishop Wulfstan (1062–95), was the first circular chapter house in Europe and was much imitated in England.

Cloisters are generally part of any monastic complex and also occur at cathedral and collegiate churches. They were essential to the communal way of life, a place for both working during daylight hours and relaxing during inclement weather. They usually abut the church building and are enclosed with windowless walls on the outside and an open arcade on the inside, looking over a courtyard or "cloister garth". They may be vaulted or have timber roofs. The arcades are often richly decorated and are home to some of the most fanciful carved capitals of the Romanesque period with those of Santo Domingo de Silos in Spain and the Abbey of St Pierre Moissac, being examples. Many Romanesque cloisters have survived in Spain, France, Italy and Germany, along with some of their associated buildings.

Baptisteries often occur in Italy as a free standing structure, associated with a cathedral. They are generally octagonal or circular and domed. The interior may be arcaded on several levels as at Pisa Cathedral. Other notable Romanesque baptisteries are that at Parma Cathedral remarkable for its galleried exterior, and the polychrome Baptistery of San Giovanni of Florence Cathedral, with vault mosaics of the 13th century including Christ in Majesty, possibly the work of the almost legendary Coppo di Marcovaldo.

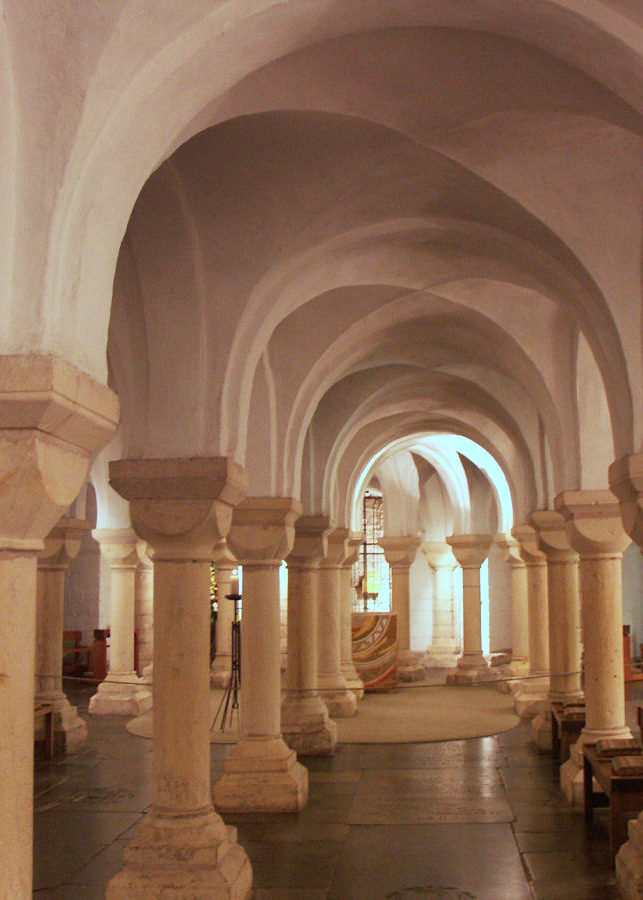
The groin-vaulted crypt of Worcester Cathedral

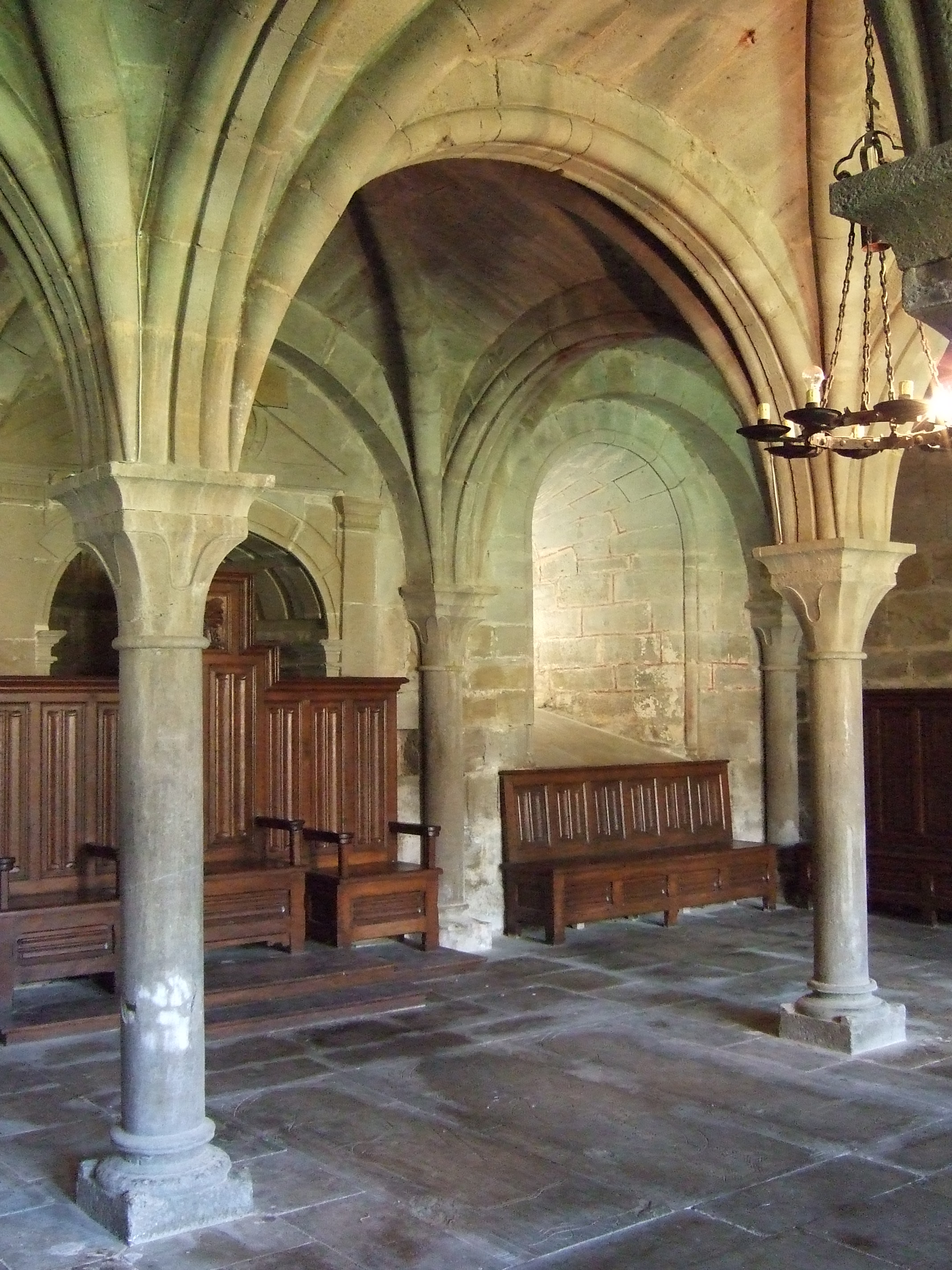
The chapter house of Santa María de la Oliva, Carcastillo, Spain

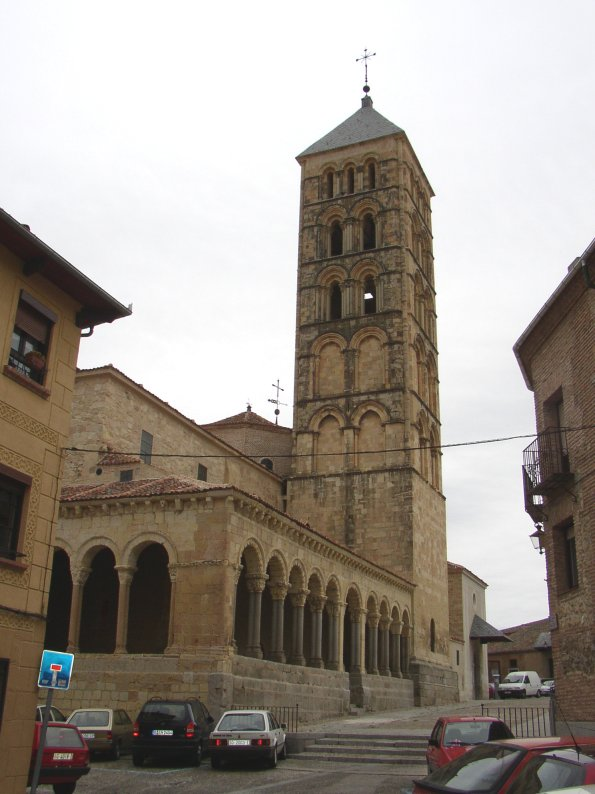
The lateral porch of the Church of San Esteban, Segovia

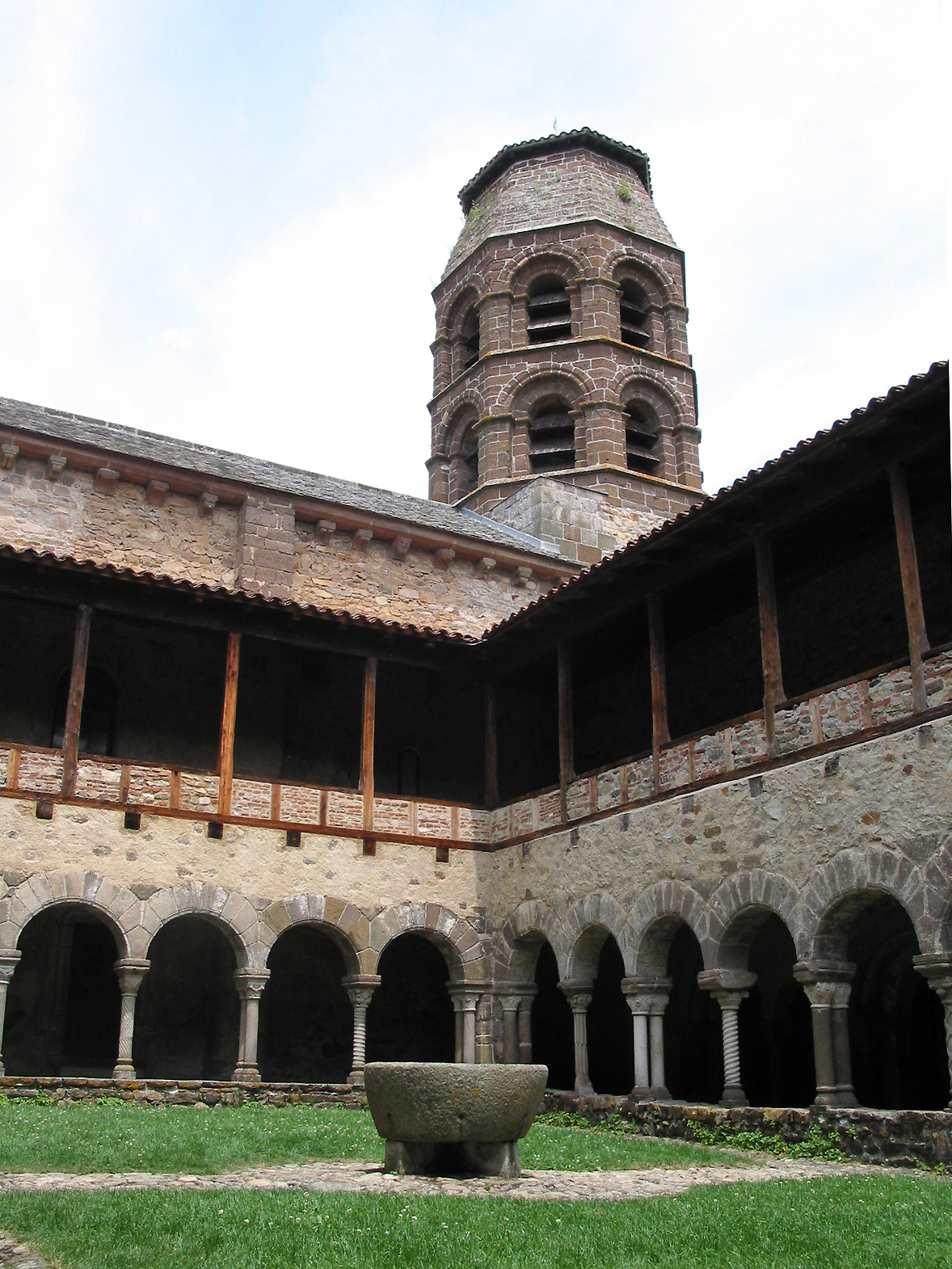
The cloister of Lavaudieu Abbey

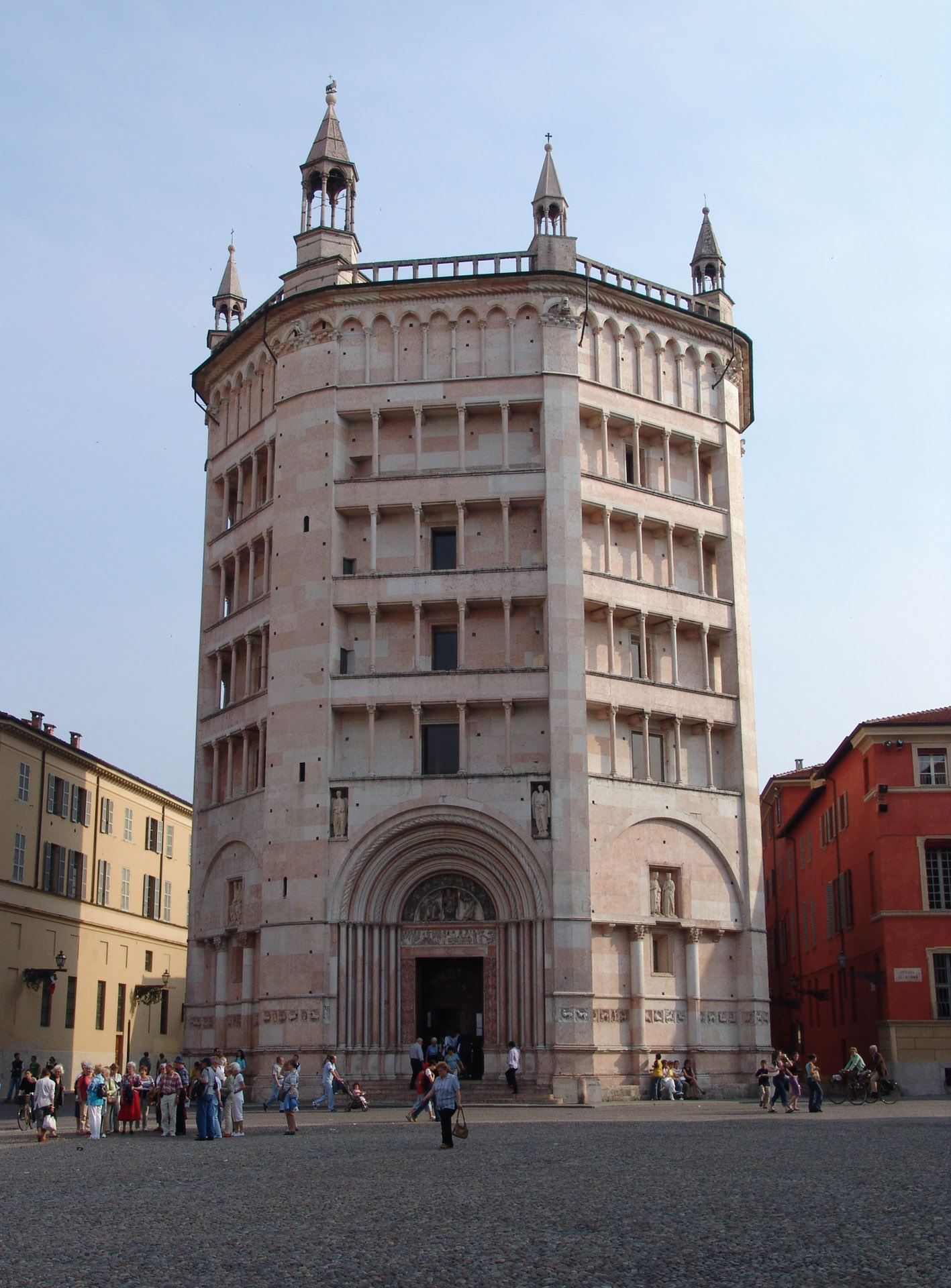
The Baptistery of Parma Cathedral

=== Decoration ===
==== Architectural embellishment ====
Arcading is the single most significant decorative feature of Romanesque architecture. It occurs in a variety of forms, from the Lombard band, which is a row of small arches that appear to support a roofline or course, to shallow blind arcading that is often a feature of English architecture and is seen in great variety at Ely Cathedral, to the open dwarf gallery, first used at Speyer Cathedral and widely adopted in Italy as seen on both Pisa Cathedral and its famous Leaning Tower. Arcades could be used to great effect, both externally and internally, as exemplified by the church of Santa Maria della Pieve, in Arezzo.

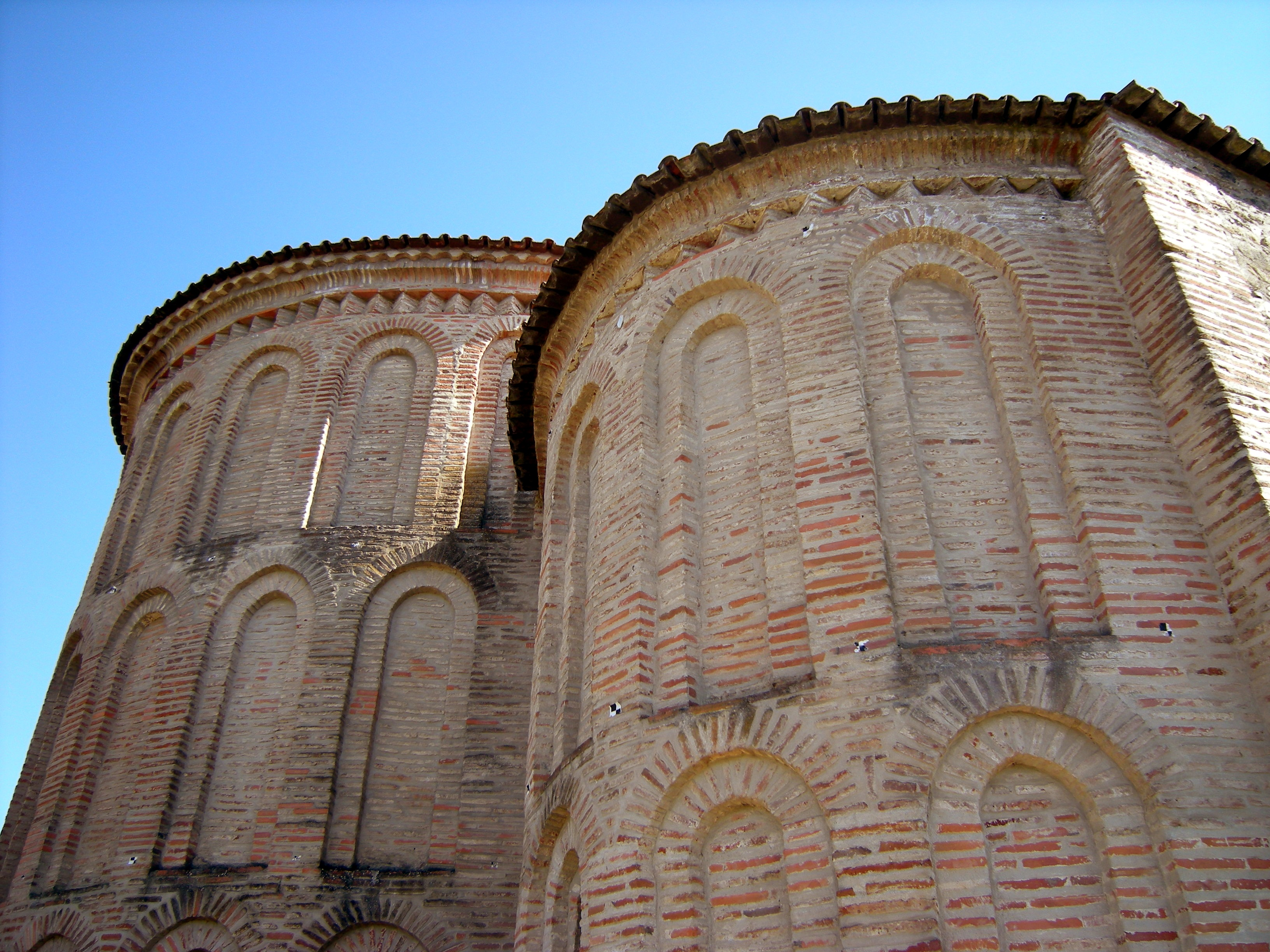
Blind arcading in brick in the Mozarabic style of Asturia and Leon on the apse of Castro de Avelãs Monastery, a unique example in Portugal

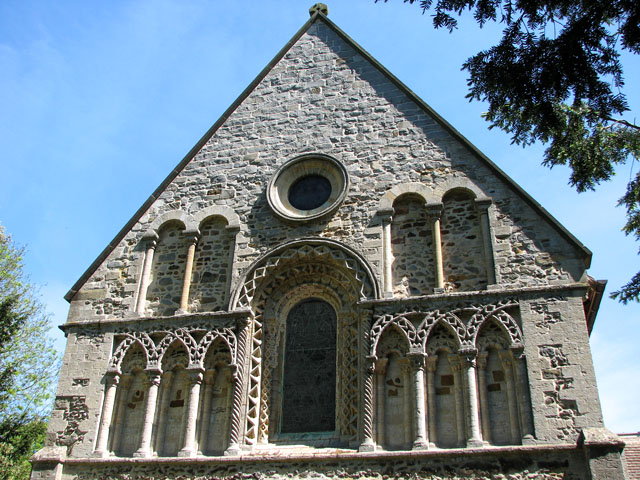
Overlapping arches form a blind arcade at St Lawrence's church Castle Rising, England. (1150) The semi-circular arches form pointed arches where they overlap, a motif which may have influenced Gothic.

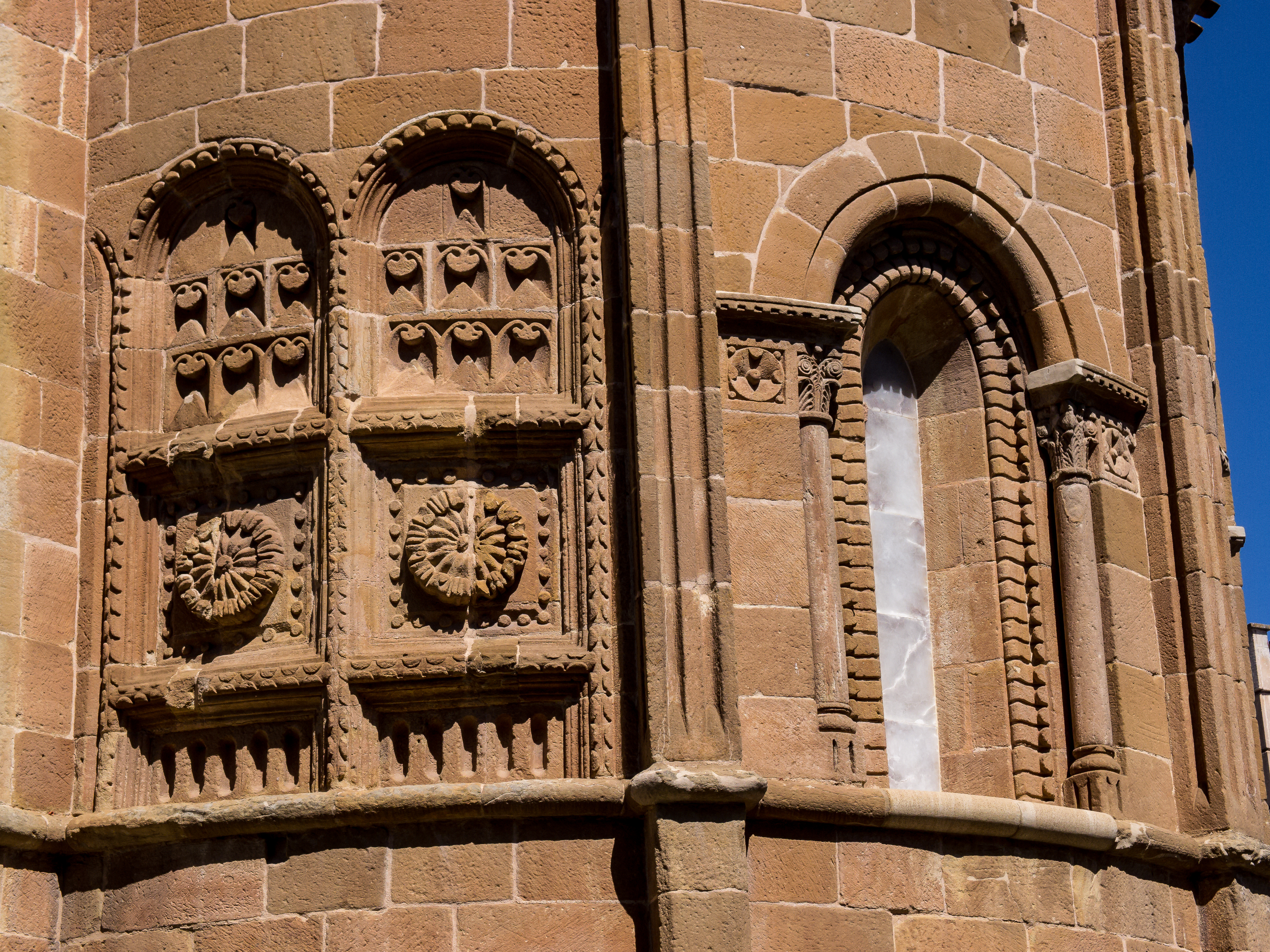
Flat striated pillars (one of which forms the axis of symmetry, separating two windows with semi-circular arches) and richly decorated blind windows in the apse of San Juan de Rabanera Church in Soria, Spain

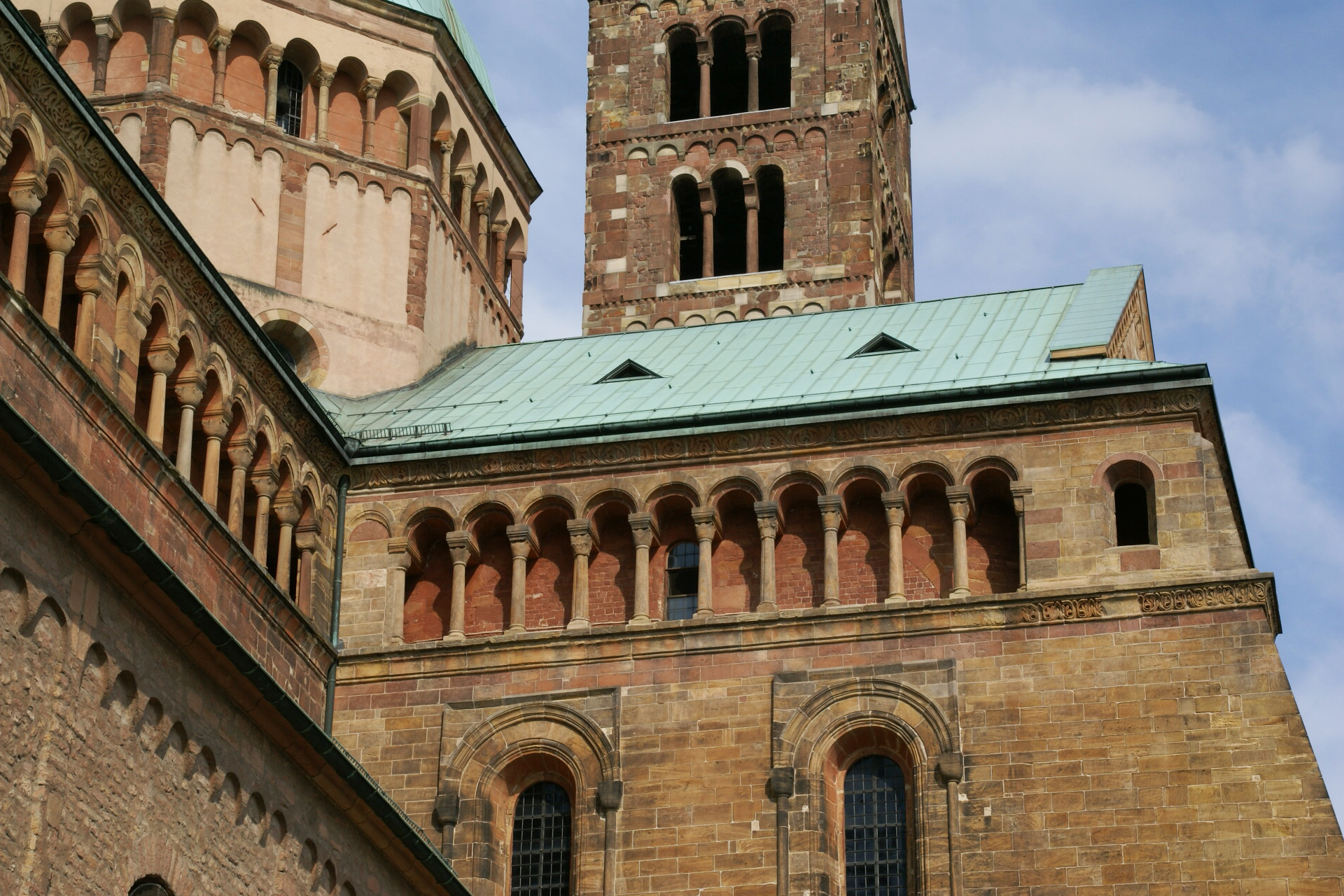
Dwarf galleries are a major decorative feature on the exterior of Speyer Cathedral, Germany (1090–1106), surrounding the walls and encircling the towers. This was to become a feature of Rhenish Romanesque.

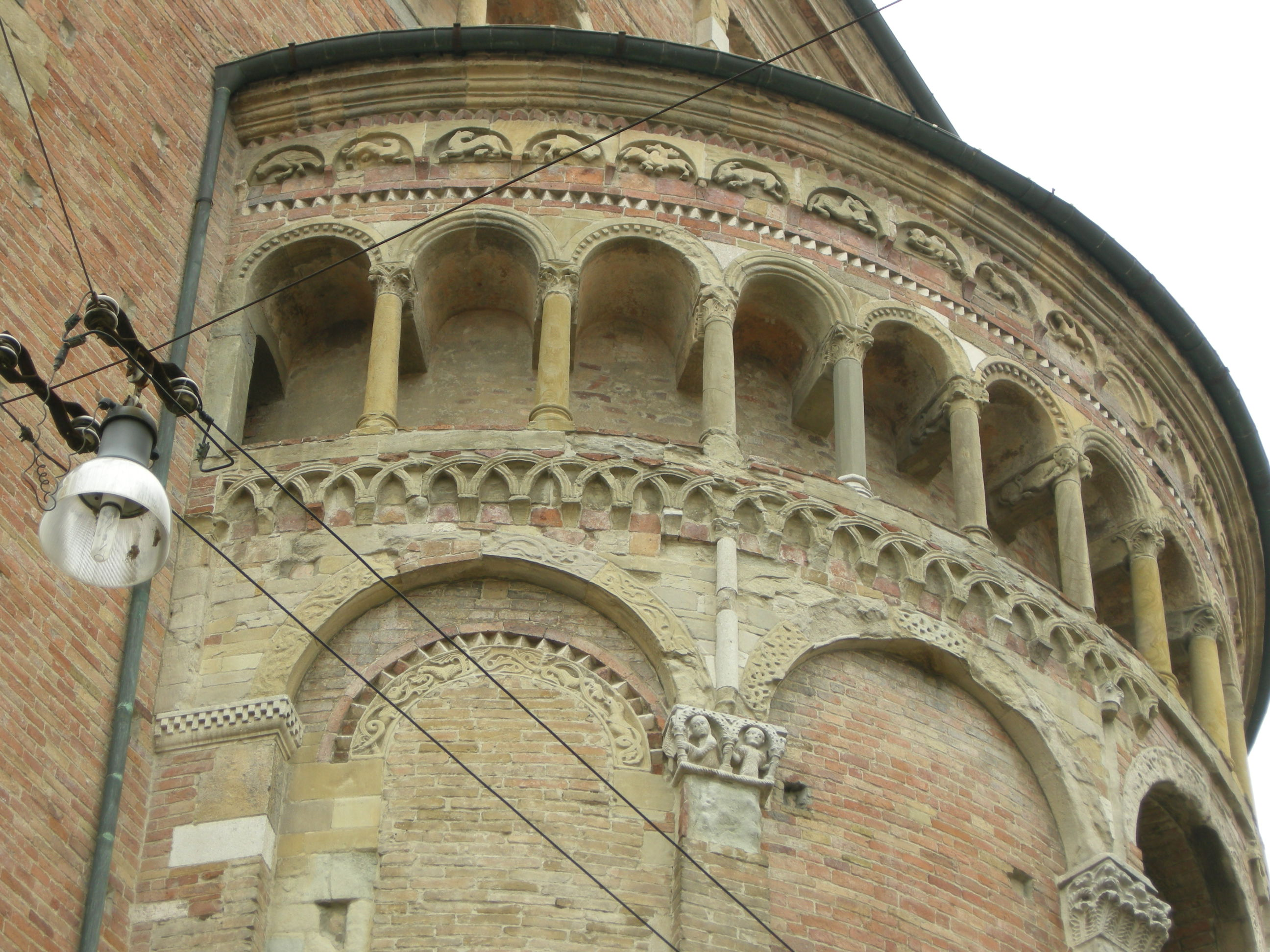
The eastern apse of Parma Cathedral, Italy, early 12th century, combines a diversity of decorative features: blind arcading, galleries, courses and sculptured motifs.

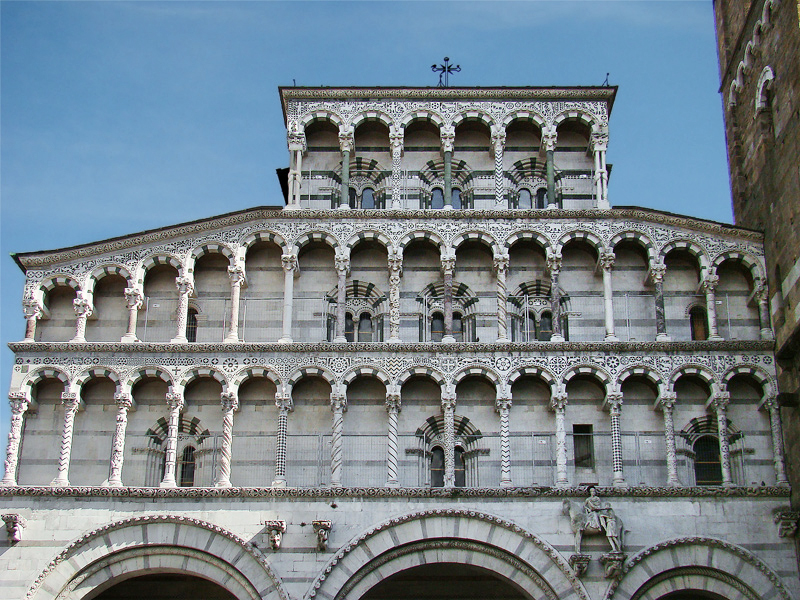
The arcading on the façade of Lucca Cathedral, Tuscany (1204), has many variations in its decorative details, both sculptural and in the inlaid polychrome marble.

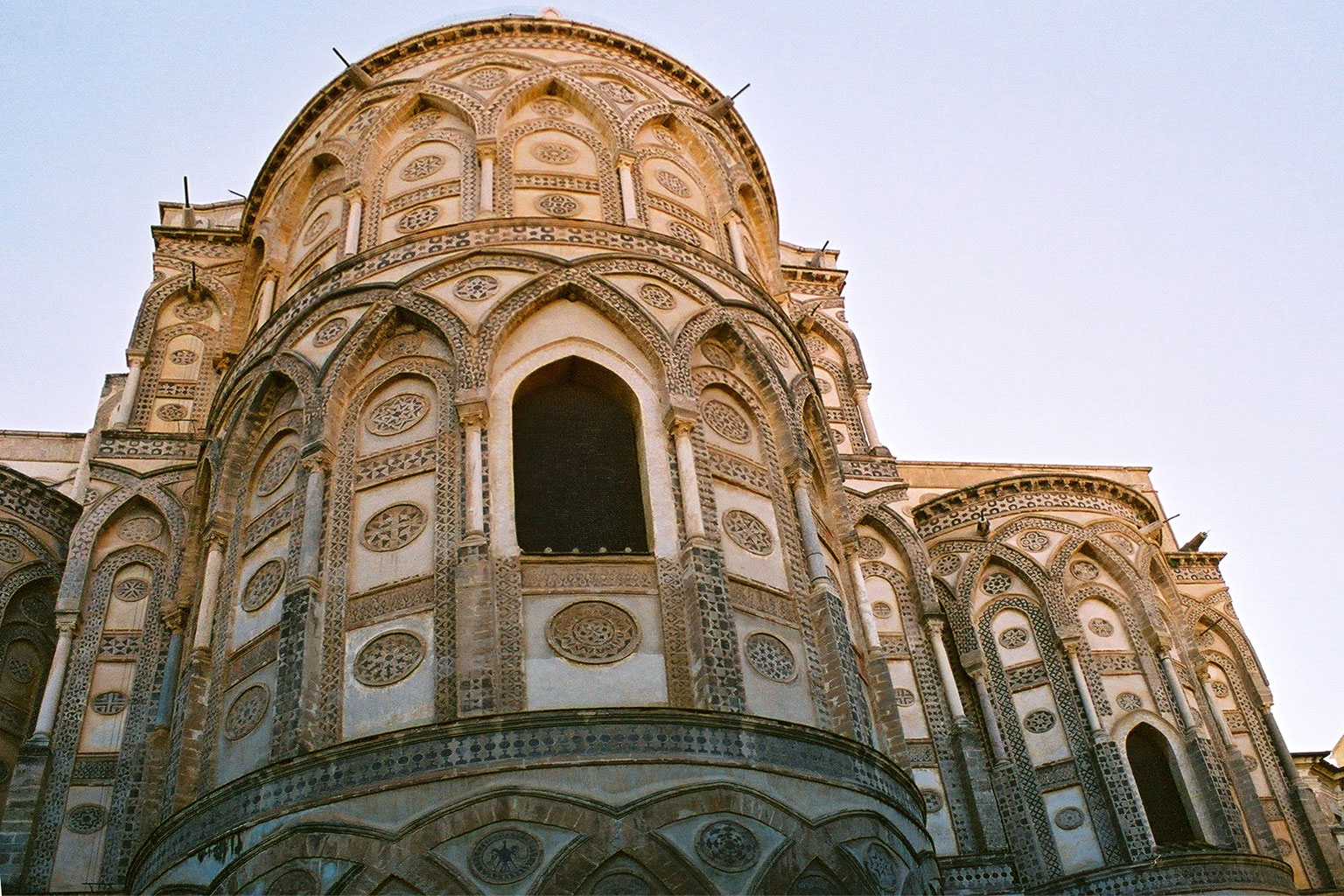
Polychrome blind arcading of the apse of Monreale Cathedral, Sicily (1174–82). The decoration indicates Islamic influence in both the motifs and the fact that all the arches, including those of the windows, are pointed.

==== Architectural sculpture ====
The Romanesque period produced a profusion of sculptural ornamentation. This most frequently took a purely geometric form and was particularly applied to mouldings, both straight courses and the curved moldings of arches. In La Madeleine, Vezelay, for example, the polychrome ribs of the vault are all edged with narrow filets of pierced stone. Similar decoration occurs around the arches of the nave and along the horizontal course separating arcade and clerestory. Combined with the pierced carving of the capitals, this gives a delicacy and refinement to the interior.

In England, such decoration could be discrete, as at Hereford and Peterborough cathedrals, or have a sense of massive energy as at Durham where the diagonal ribs of the vaults are all outlined with chevrons, the mouldings of the nave arcade are carved with several layers of the same and the huge columns are deeply incised with a variety of geometric patterns creating an impression of directional movement. These features combine to create one of the richest and most dynamic interiors of the Romanesque period.

Although much sculptural ornament was sometimes applied to the interiors of churches, the focus of such decoration was generally the west front, and in particular, the portals. Chevrons and other geometric ornaments, referred to by 19th-century writers as "barbaric ornament", are most frequently found on the mouldings of the central door. Stylized foliage often appears, sometimes deeply carved and curling outward after the manner of the acanthus leaves on Corinthian capitals, but also carved in shallow relief and spiral patterns, imitating the intricacies of manuscript illuminations. In general, the style of ornament was more classical in Italy, such as that seen around the door of San Giusto in Lucca, and more "barbaric" in England, Germany and Scandinavia, such as that seen at Lincoln and Speyer Cathedrals. France produced a great range of ornament, with particularly fine interwoven and spiralling vines in the "manuscript" style occurring at Saint-Sernin, Toulouse.

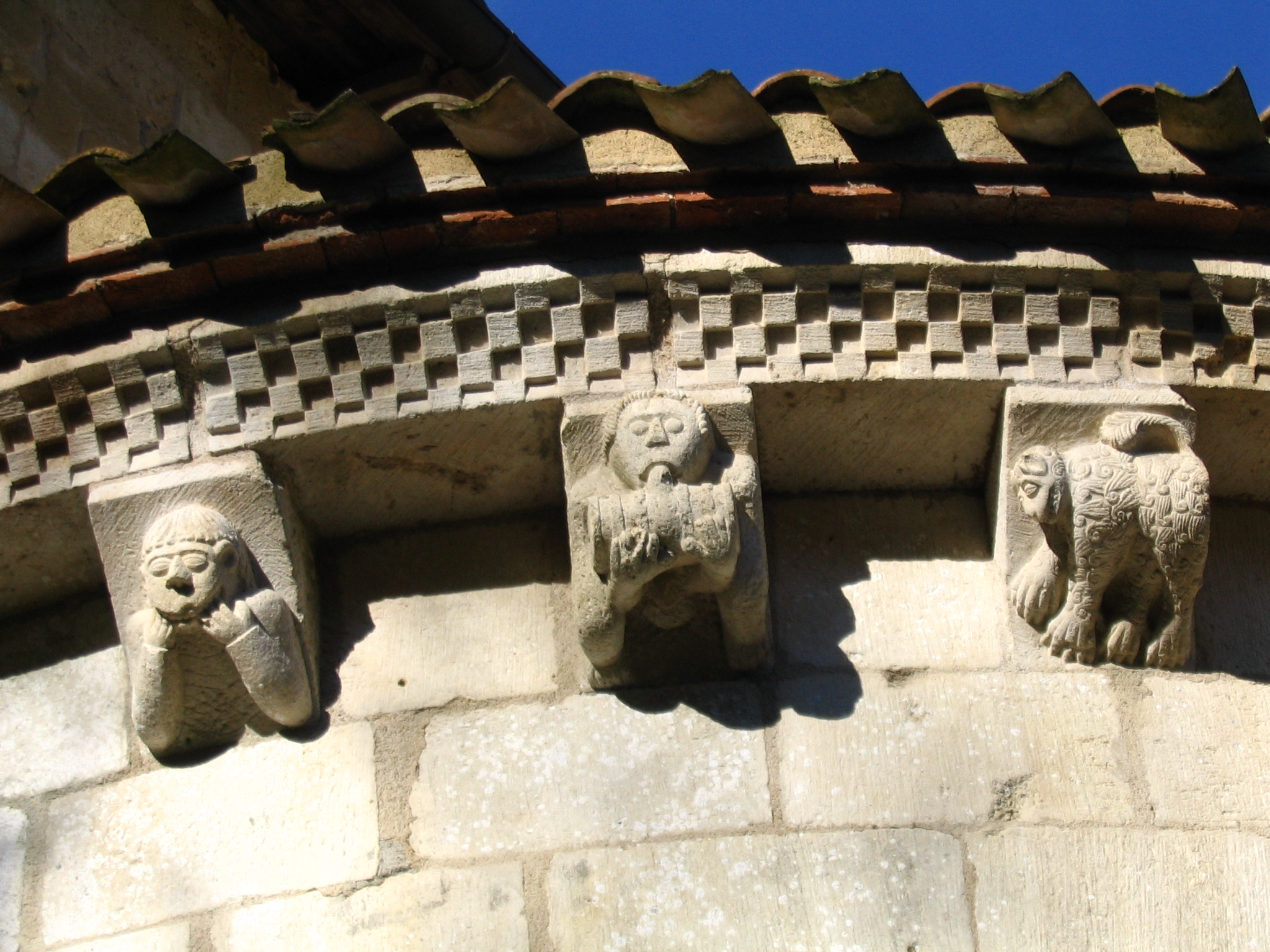
Detail of an apse of Abbey d'Arthous, Landes, France, showing corbels representing aspects of sin such as lust, drunkenness and ignorance

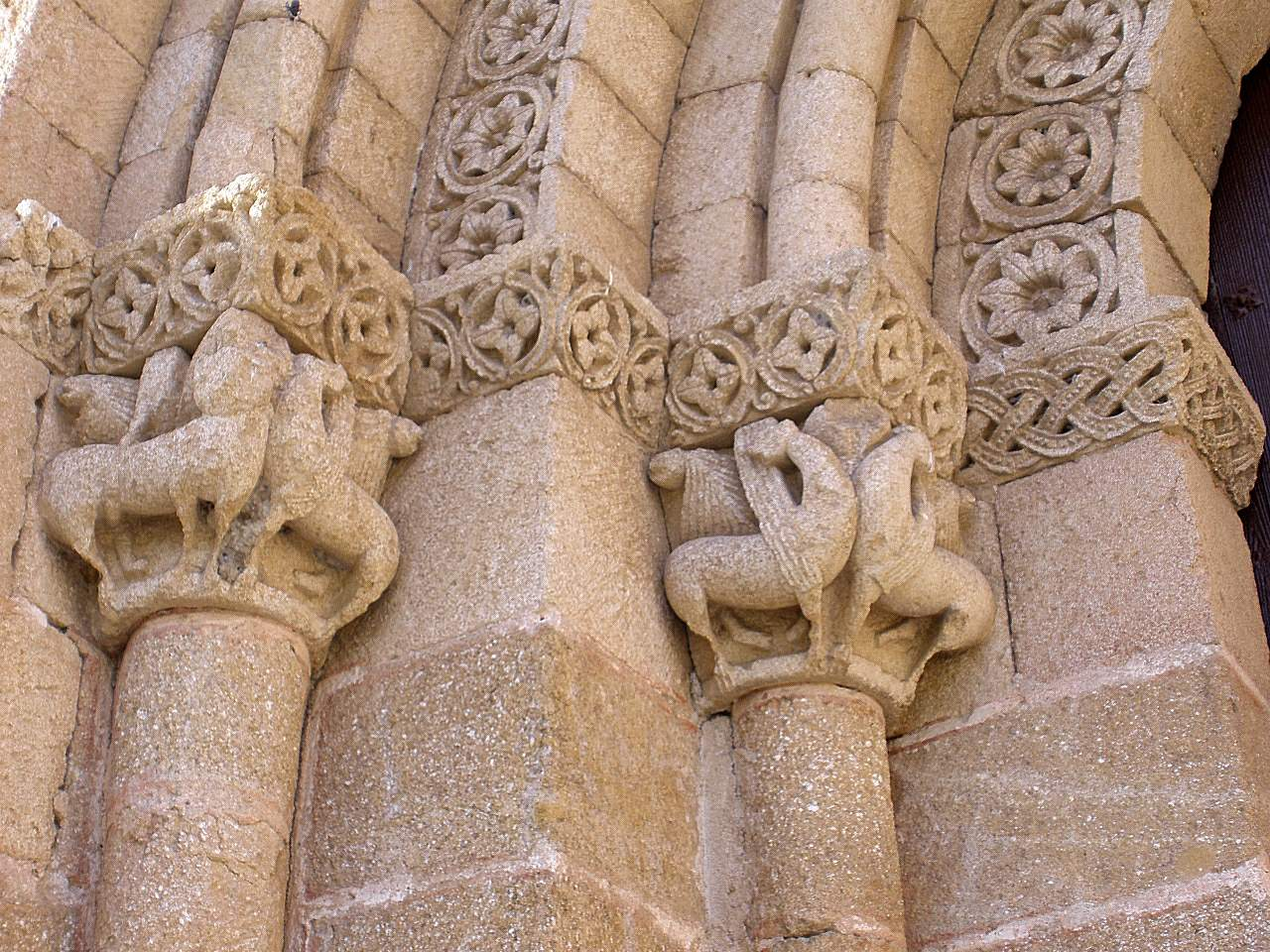
The portal of the Hermitage of St Segundo, Avila, has paired creatures. and decorative bands of floral and interlacing. The pairing of creatures could draw on Byzantine and Celtic models.

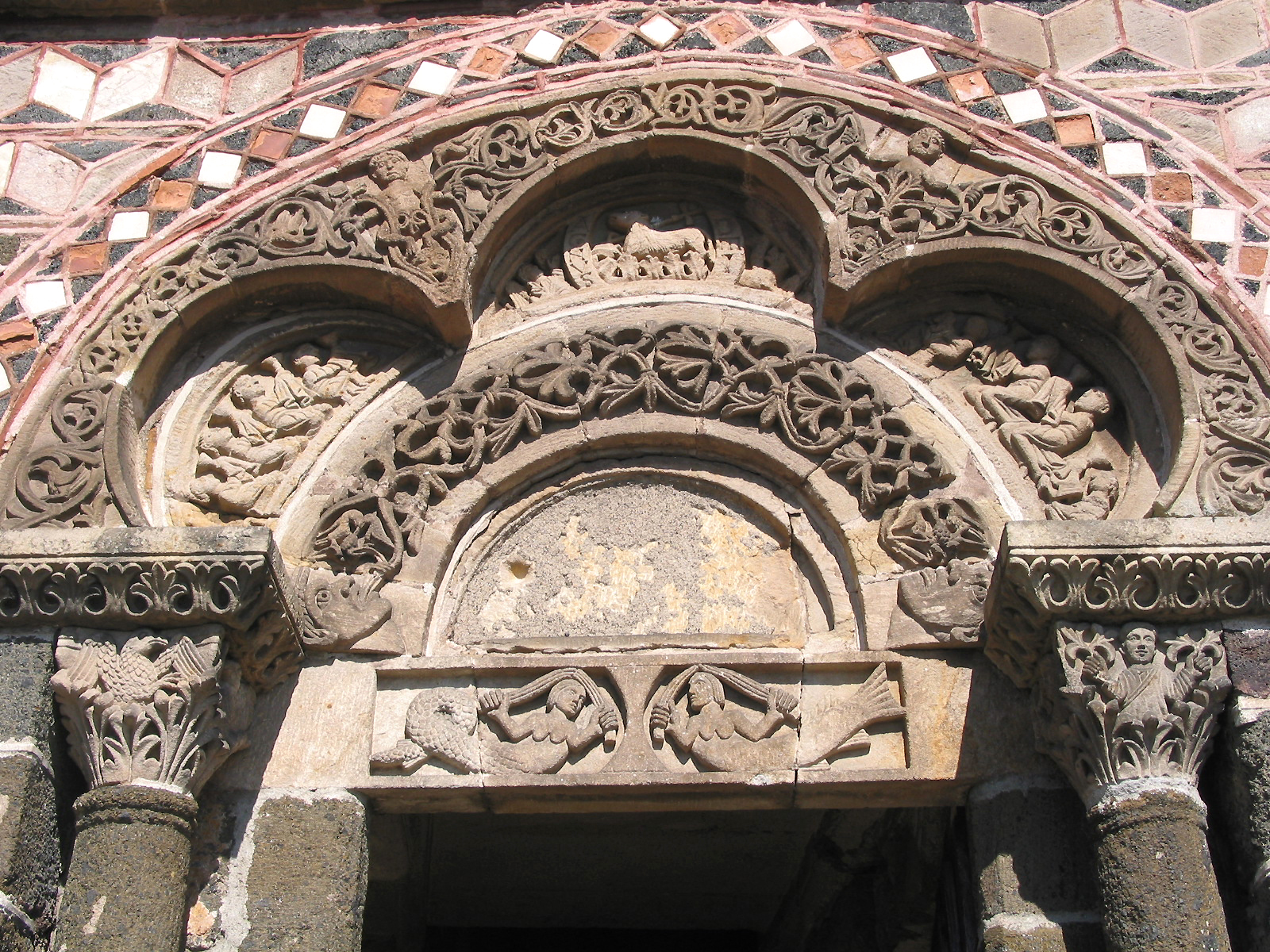
The carving of the polychrome porch of the Saint-Michel-D'aiguilhe chapel, the Aiguilhe, Haute-Loire, France, 11th century, has paired mermaids, and the Lamb of God.

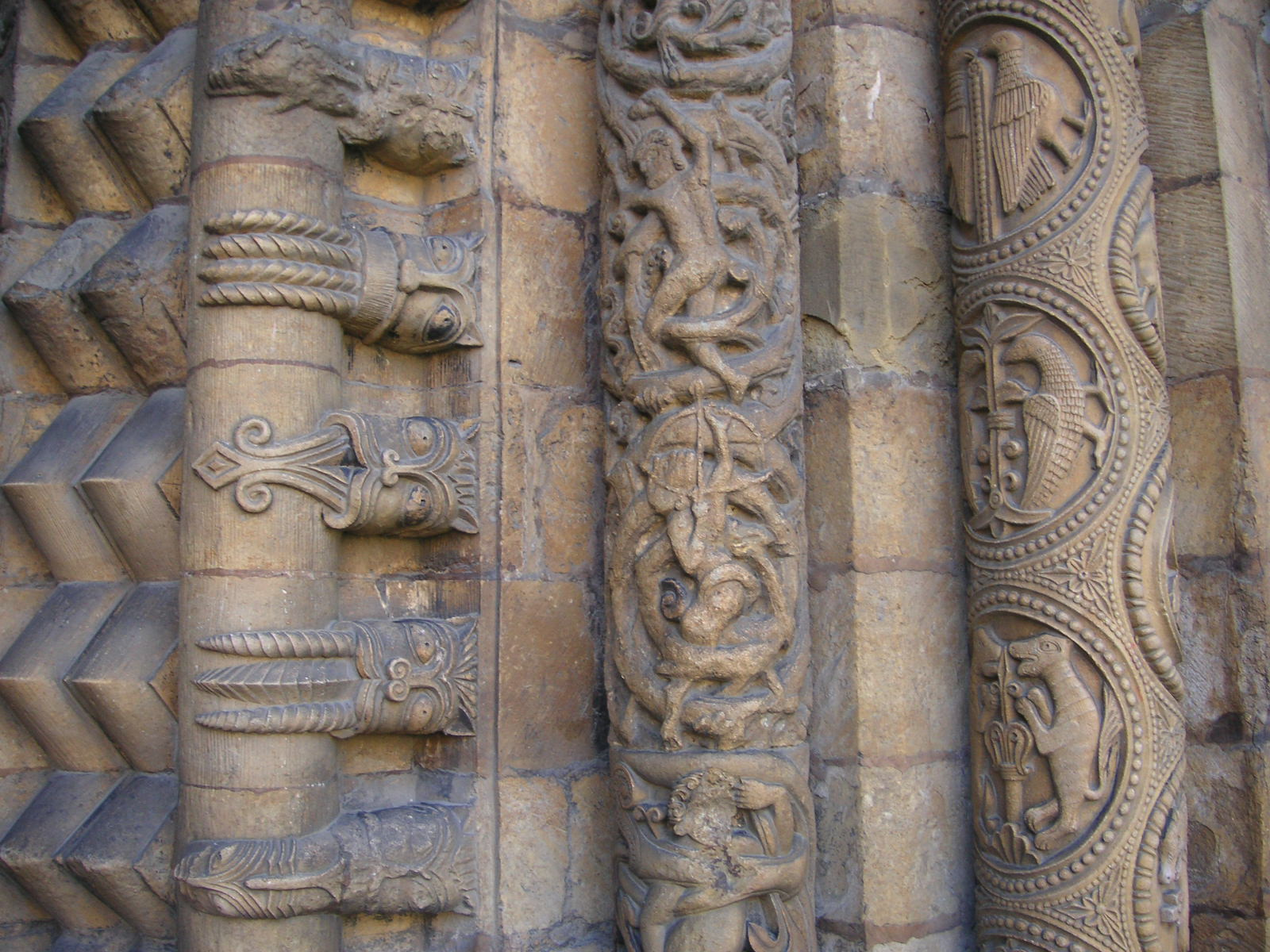
On these mouldings around the portal of Lincoln Cathedral are formal chevron ornament, tongue-poking monsters, vines and figures, and symmetrical motifs.

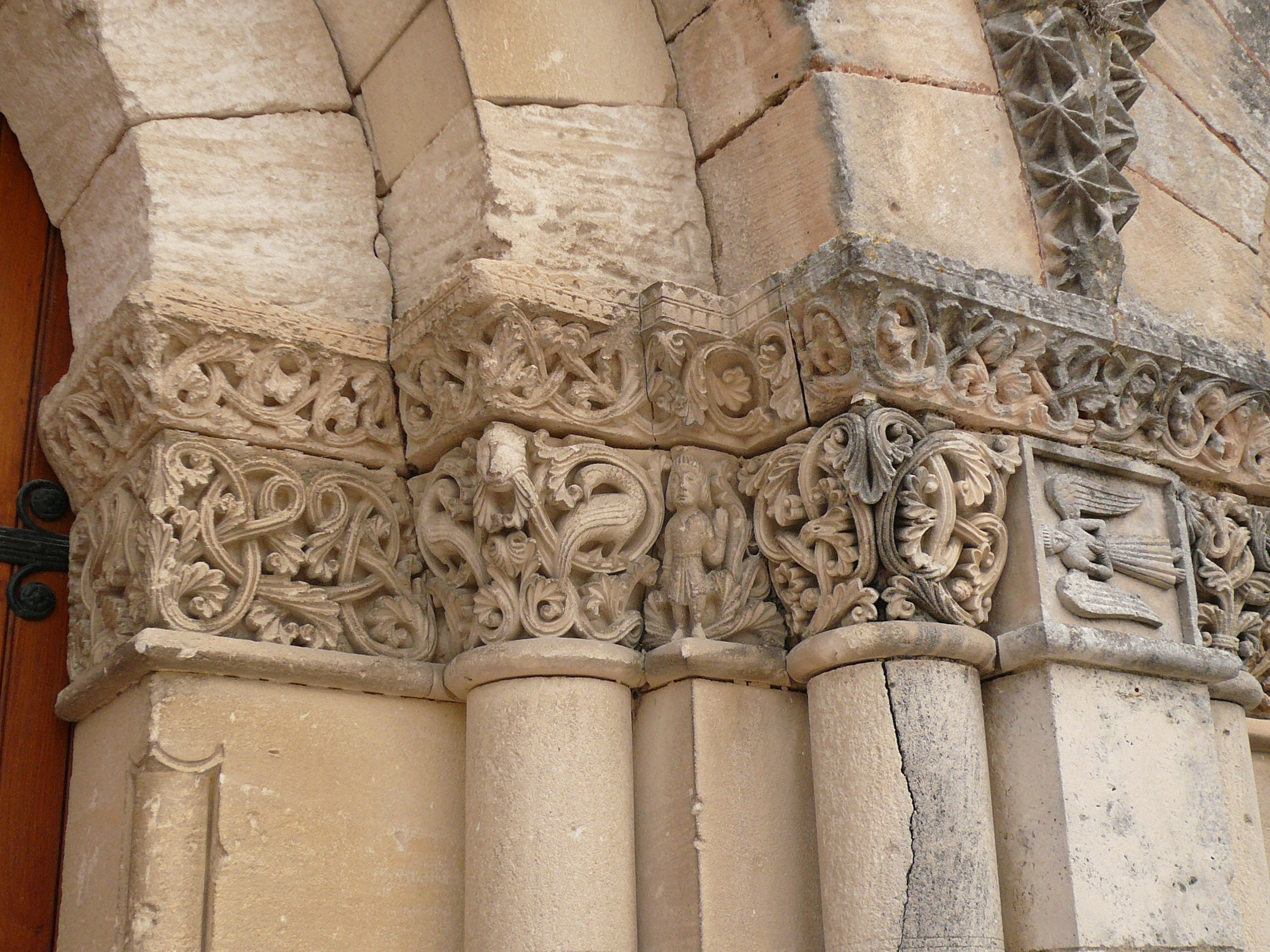
St Martin's Church, Gensac-la-Pallue has capitals with elaborate interlacing.

==== Figurative sculpture ====
The name of the architectural style was transferred onto the art of the period. Romanesque art provided fine examples of painting and sculpture, but, while the Romanesque churches were flush with colours, most large paintings were lost. The period brought a major revival of sculpture.

With the fall of the Roman Empire, the tradition of carving large works in stone and sculpting figures in bronze died out. The best-known surviving large sculptural work of Proto-Romanesque Europe is the life-size wooden Crucifix commissioned by Archbishop Gero of Cologne in about 960–65. During the 11th and 12th centuries, figurative sculpture flourished in a distinctly Romanesque style that can be recognised across Europe, although the most spectacular sculptural projects are concentrated in South-Western France, Northern Spain and Italy.

Major figurative decoration occurs particularly around the portals of cathedrals and churches, ornamenting the tympanum, lintels, jambs and central posts. The tympanum is typically decorated with the imagery of Christ in Majesty with the symbols of the Four Evangelists, drawn directly from the gilt covers of medieval Gospel Books. This style of doorway occurs in many places and continued into the Gothic period. A rare survival in England is that of the "Prior's Door" at Ely Cathedral. In France, many have survived, with examples at the Abbey of Saint-Pierre, Moissac, the Abbey of Sainte-Marie, Souillac, and Abbey of la Madaleine, Vézelay – all daughter houses of Cluny, with extensive other sculpture remaining in cloisters and other buildings. Nearby, Autun Cathedral has a Last Judgement of great rarity in that it has uniquely been signed by its creator Giselbertus (who was perhaps the patron rather than the sculptor). The same artist is thought to have worked at la Madeleine Vezelay which uniquely has two elaborately carved tympanum, the early inner one representing the Last Judgement and that on the outer portal of the narthex representing Jesus sending forth the Apostles to preach to the nations.

It is a feature of Romanesque art, both in manuscript illumination and sculptural decoration, that figures are contorted to fit the space that they occupy. Among the many examples that exist, one of the finest is the figure of the Prophet Jeremiah from the pillar of the portal of the Abbey of Saint-Pierre, Moissac, France, from about 1130. A significant motif of Romanesque design is the spiral, a form applied to both plant motifs and drapery in Romanesque sculpture. An outstanding example of its use in drapery is that of the central figure of Christ on the outer portal at La Madaleine, Vezelay.

Many of the smaller sculptural works, particularly capitals, are Biblical in subject and include scenes of Creation and the Fall of Man, episodes from the life of Christ and those Old Testament scenes that prefigure his Death and Resurrection, such as Jonah and the Whale and Daniel in the lions' den. Many Nativity scenes occur, the theme of the Three Kings being particularly popular. The cloisters of Santo Domingo de Silos Abbey in Northern Spain, and Moissac are fine examples surviving complete.

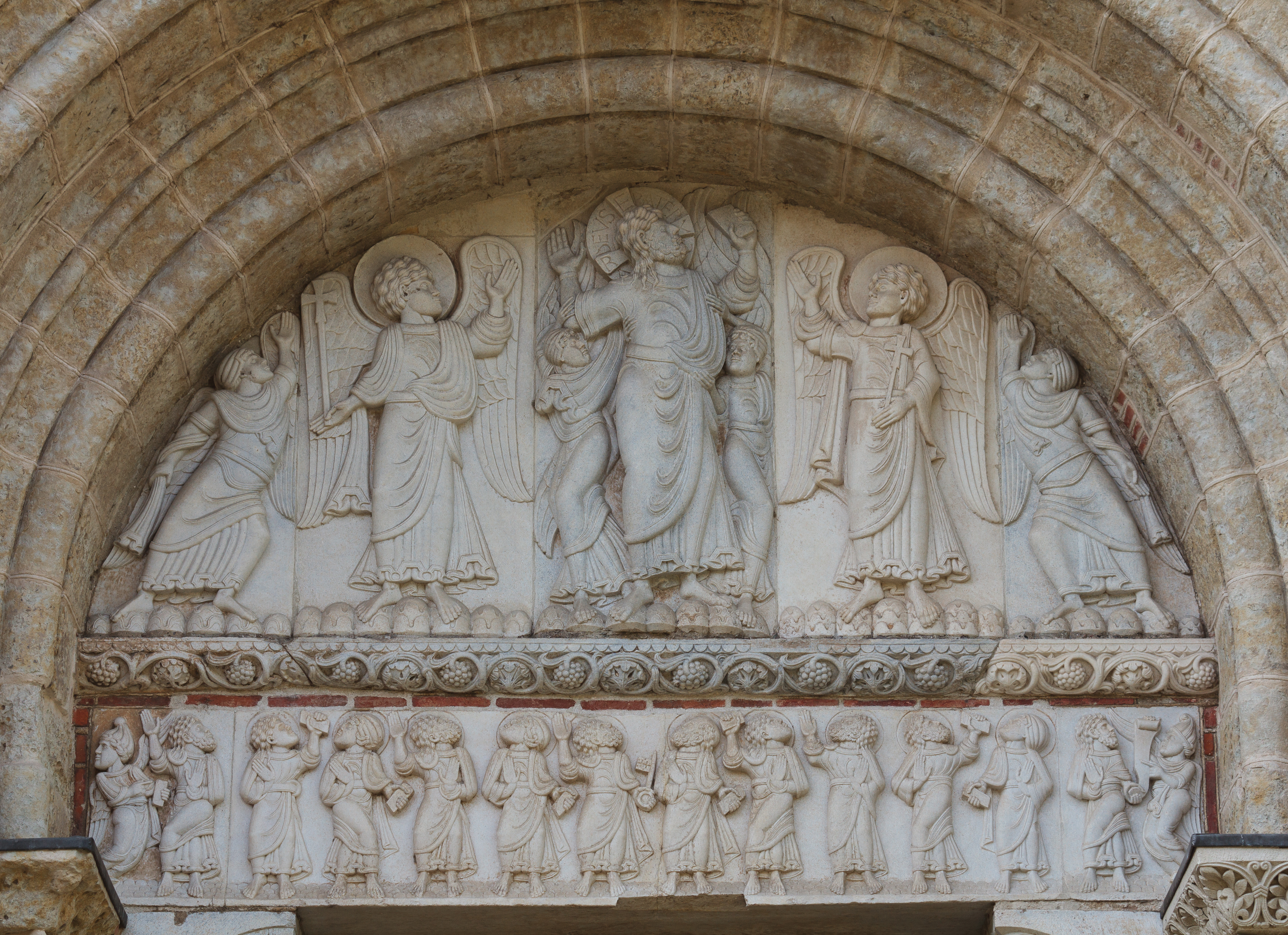
The tympanum of the side entrance of Saint-Sernin of Toulouse, (c. 1115) shows the Ascension of Christ, surrounded by angels, in a simple composition of standing figures.

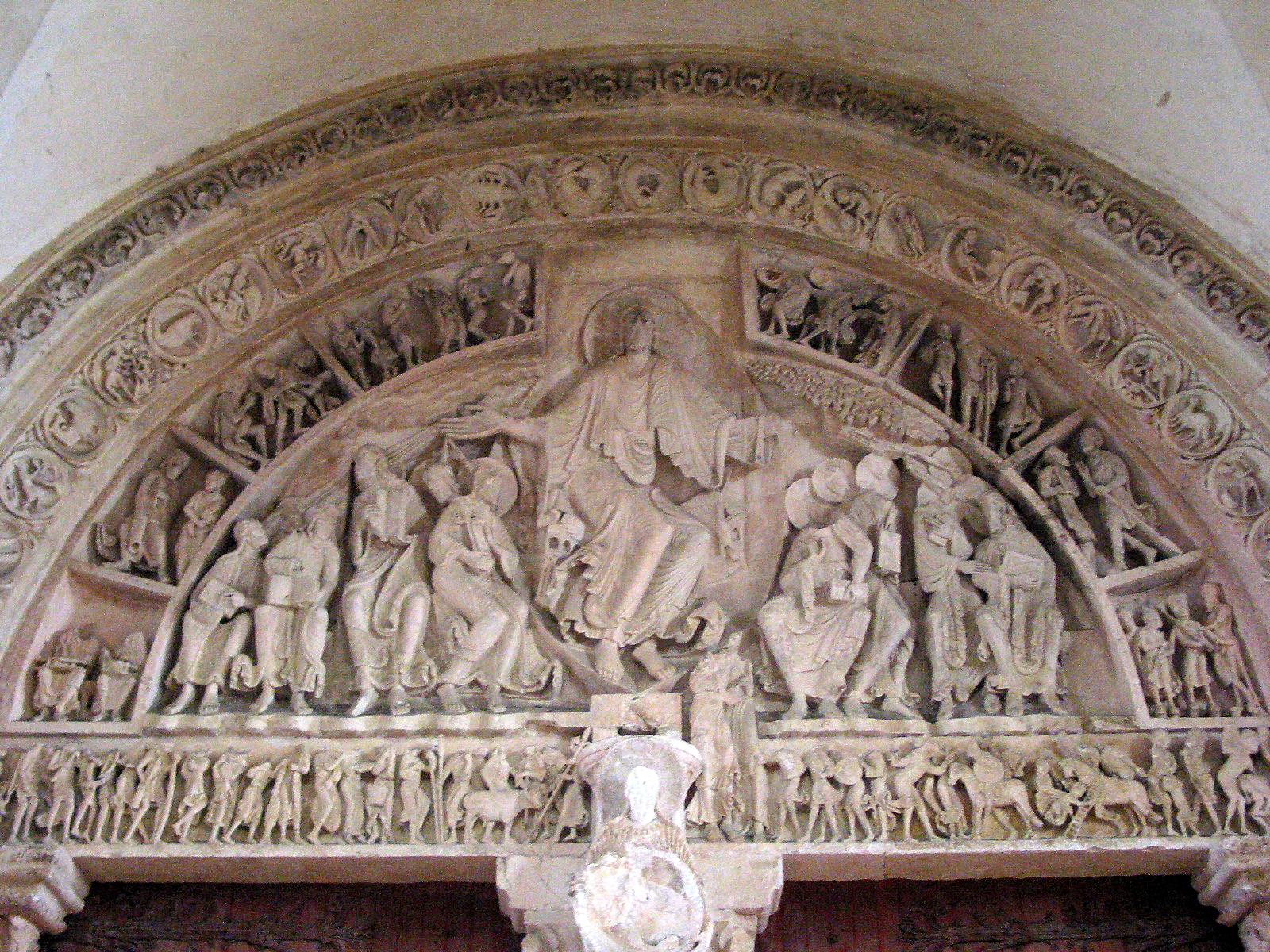
The tympanum of the inner portal of la Madeleine Vezelay has the scene of Christ in Majesty, at the Last Judgement. The figure of Christ is highly formalised in both posture and treatment. (1130s)

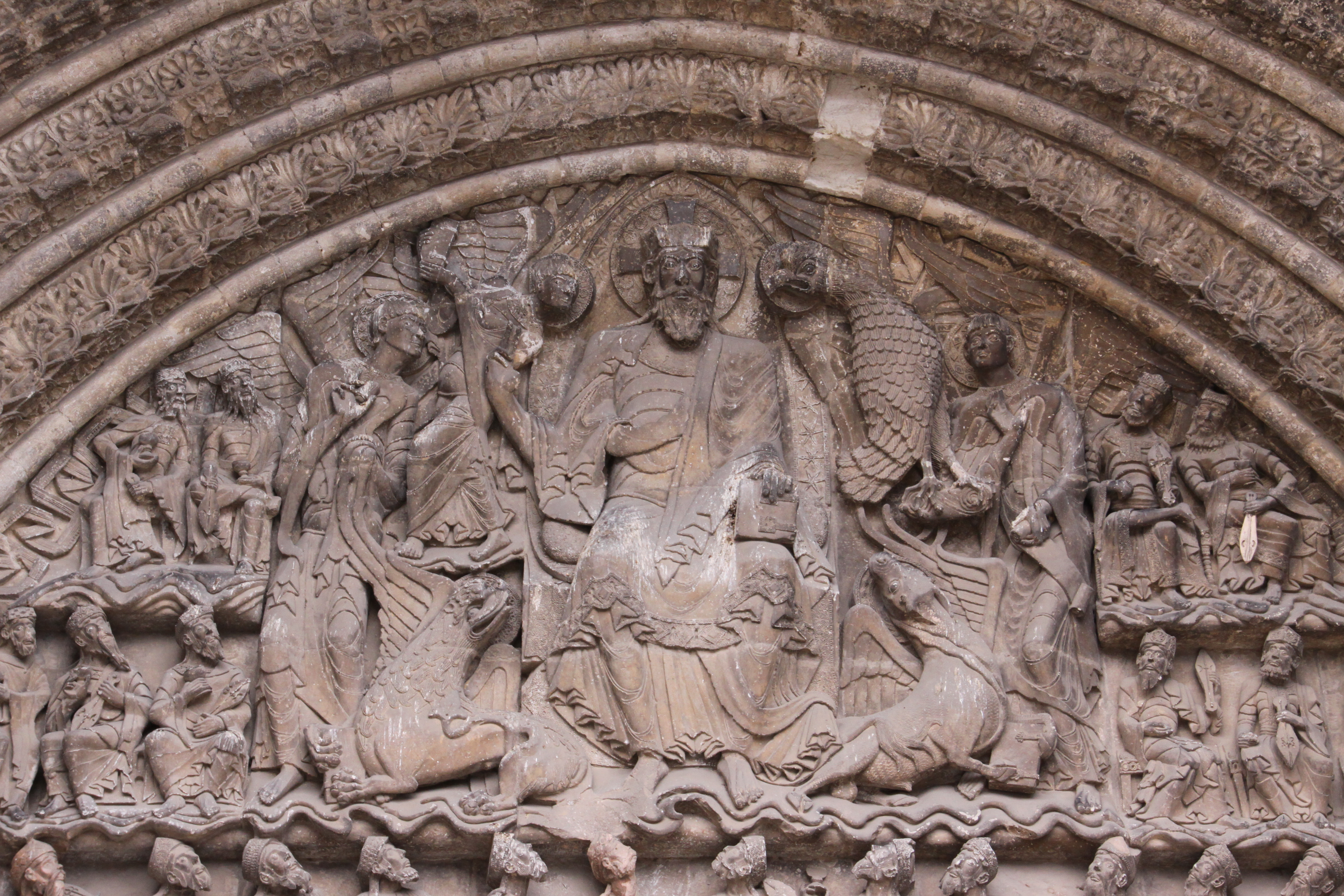
The tympanum of the Saint-Pierre, Moissac, is a highly sophisticated, tightly packed design, like a manuscript illumination. Christ is surrounded by the symbols of the Four Evangelists.

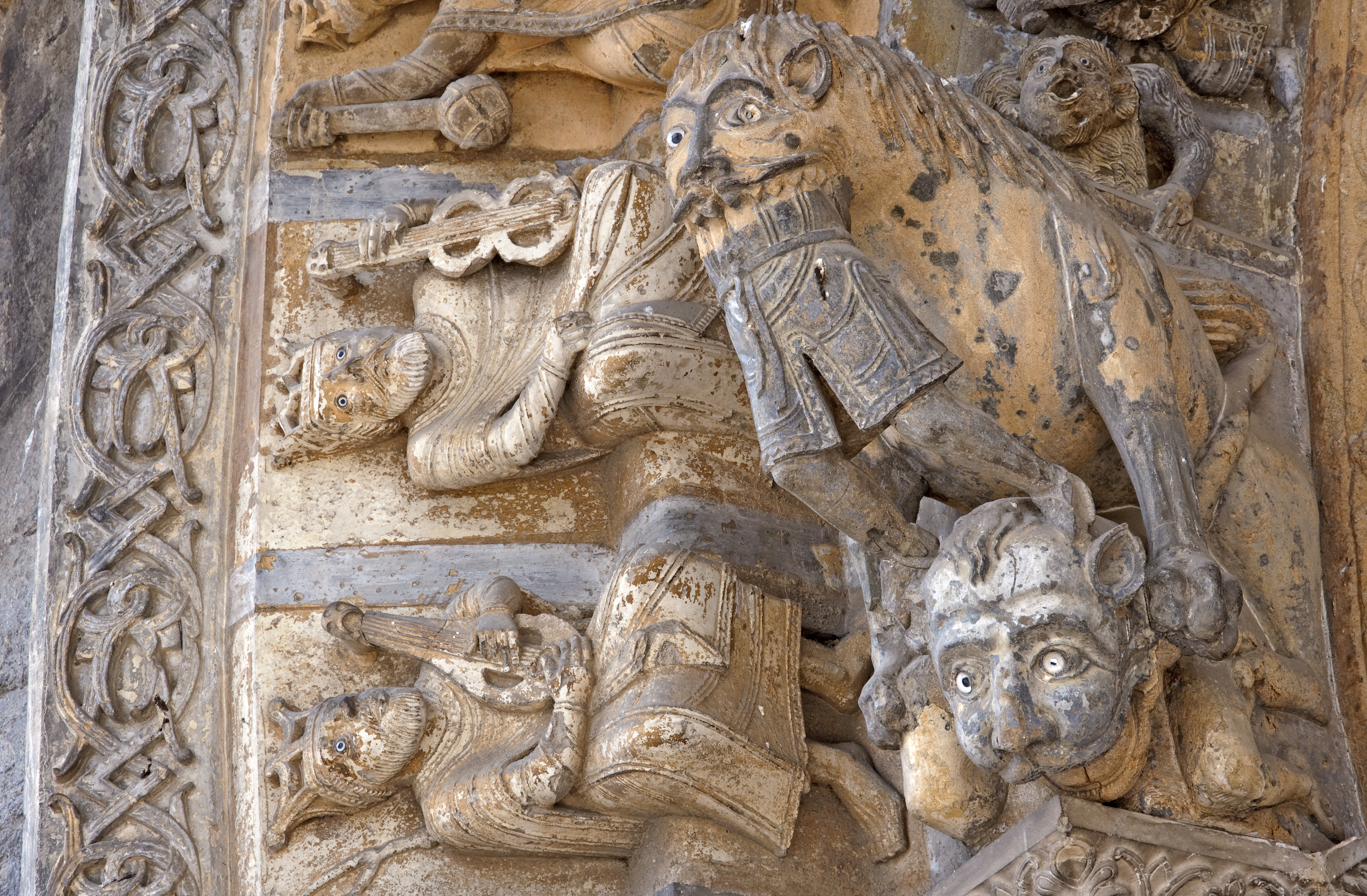
Details of the portal of Oloron Cathedral show a demon, a lion swallowing a man and kings with musical instruments.

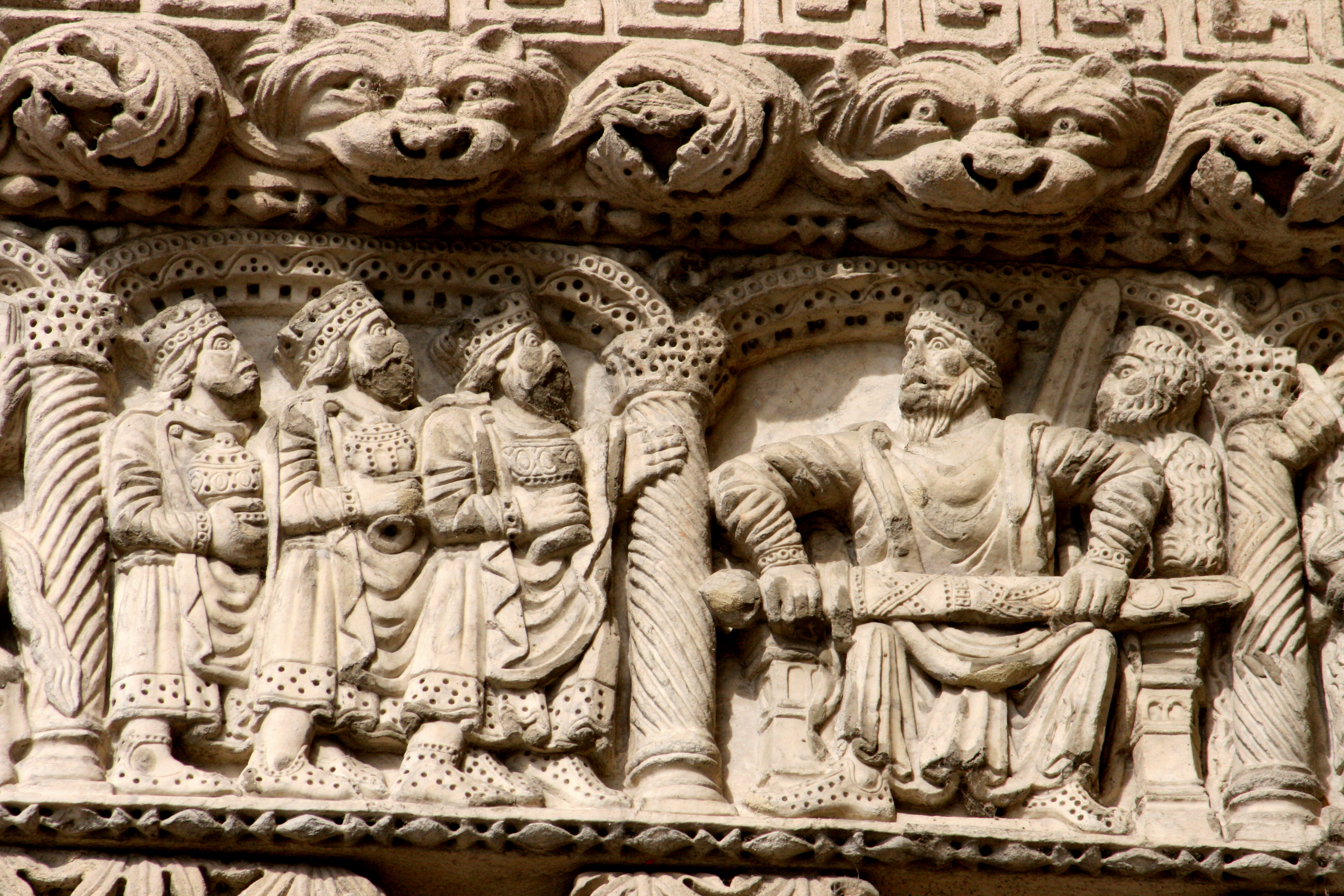
A relief from St Trophime, Arles, showing King Herod and the Three Kings, follows the conventions in that the seated Herod is much larger than the standing figures.

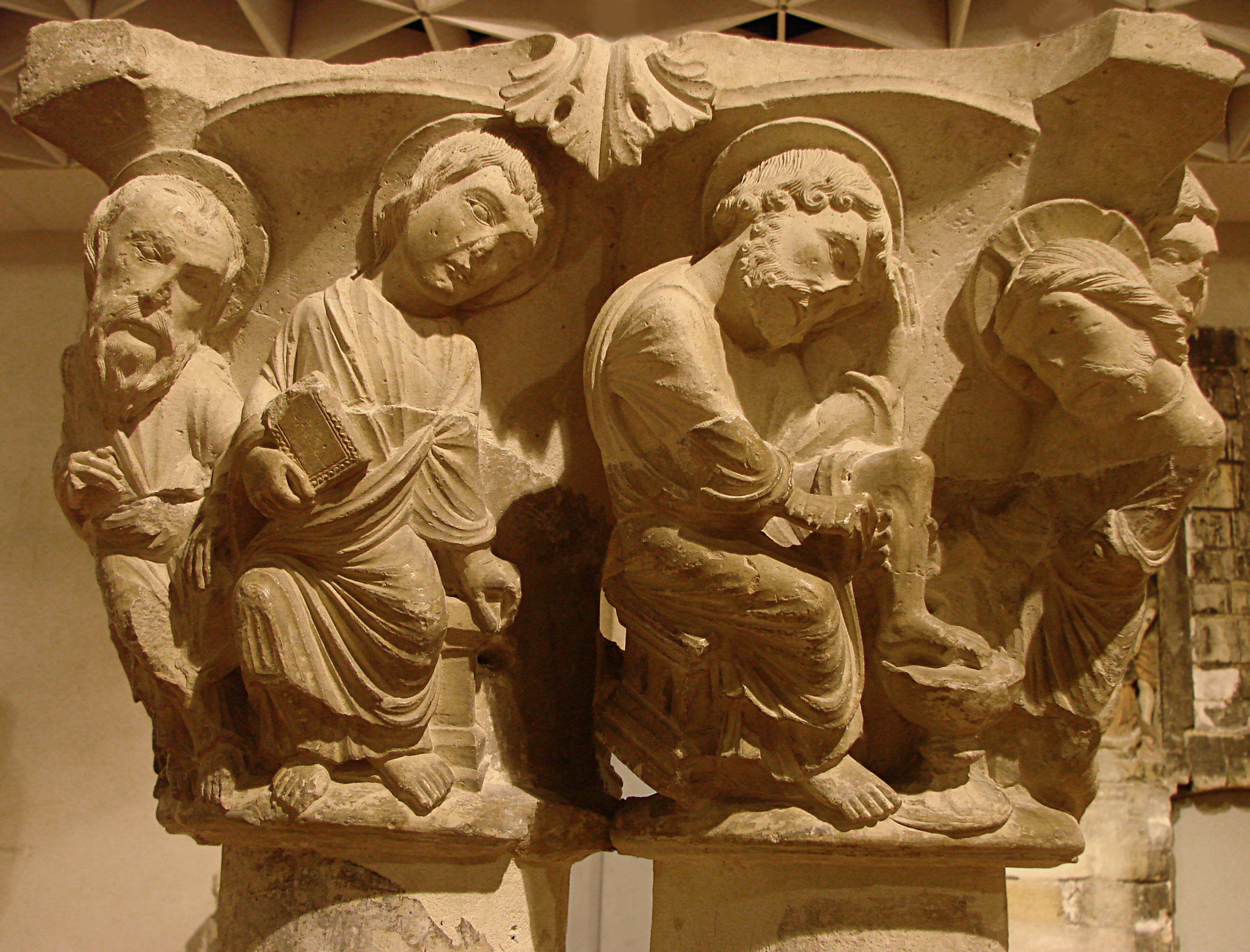
Notre-Dame-en-Vaux, Châlons-en-Champagne. This paired capital representing Christ washing the feet of the disciples is lively and naturalistic.

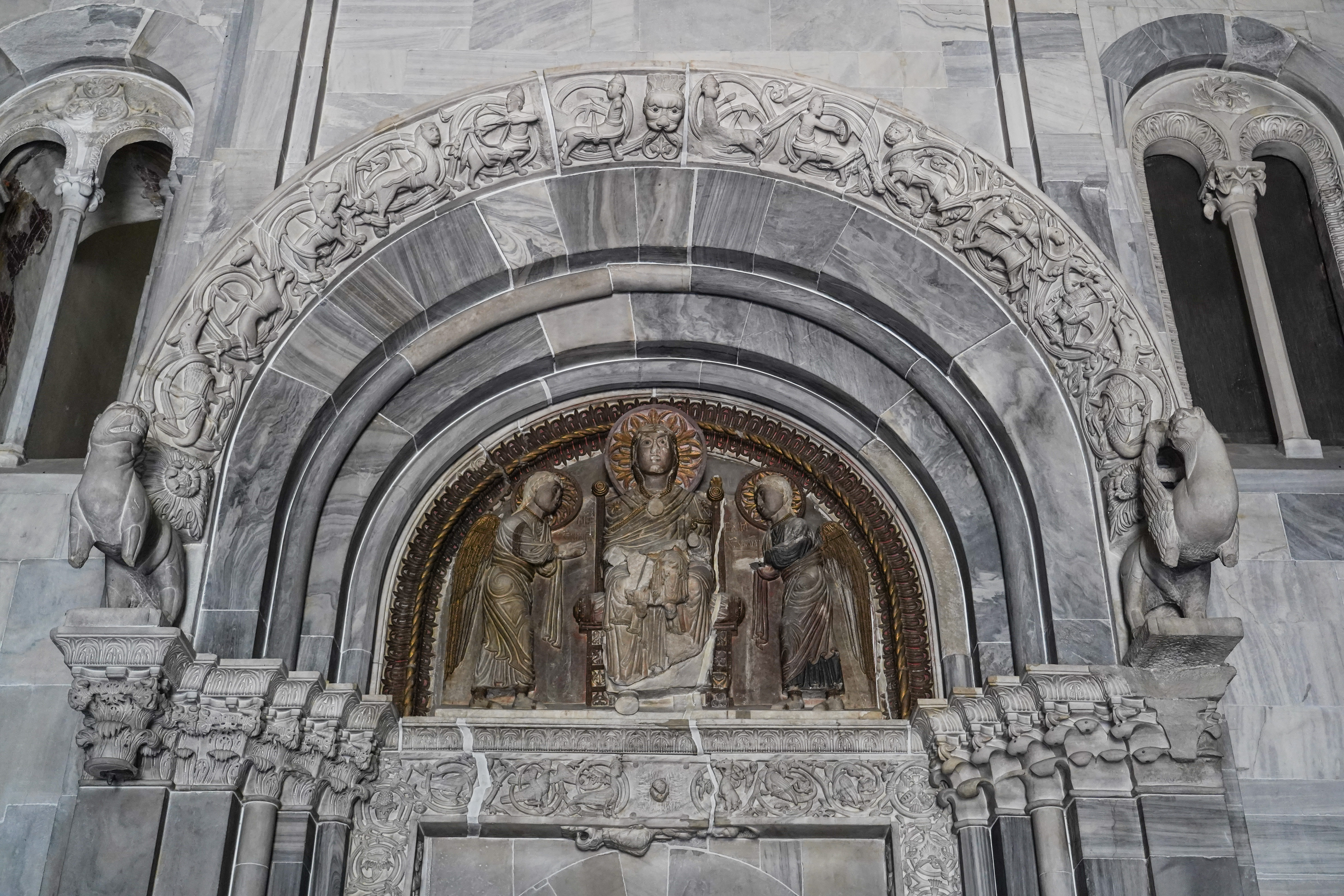
St. Virgin Mary Mother of God church Studenica Monastery entrance, with Holy Virgin Mother of God Mary with Jesus Christ (Immanuel), in center with Holy Archangels (1190)

==== Murals ====
The large wall surfaces and plain curving vaults of the Romanesque period lent themselves to mural decoration. Many of these early wall paintings have been destroyed by damp or the walls have been replastered and painted over. In most of Northern Europe such pictures were systematically destroyed in bouts of Reformation iconoclasm. In other countries they have suffered from war, neglect and changing fashion.

A classic scheme for the full painted decoration of a church, derived from earlier examples often in mosaic, had, as its focal point in the semi-dome of the apse, Christ in Majesty or Christ the Redeemer enthroned within a mandorla and framed by the four winged beasts, symbols of the Four Evangelists, comparing directly with examples from the gilt covers or the illuminations of Gospel Books of the period. If the Virgin Mary was the dedicatee of the church, she might replace Christ here. On the apse walls below would be saints and apostles, perhaps including narrative scenes, for example of the saint to whom the church was dedicated. On the sanctuary arch were figures of apostles, prophets or the twenty-four "Elders of the Apocalypse", looking in towards a bust of Christ, or his symbol the Lamb, at the top of the arch. The north wall of the nave would contain narrative scenes from the Old Testament, and the south wall from the New Testament. On the rear west wall would be a Doom painting or Last Judgement, with an enthroned and judging Christ at the top.

One of the most intact schemes to exist is that at Saint-Savin-sur-Gartempe in France. (See picture above under "Vault") The long barrel vault of the nave provides an excellent surface for fresco, and is decorated with scenes of the Old Testament, showing the Creation, the Fall of Man and other stories including a lively depiction of Noah's Ark complete with a fearsome figurehead and numerous windows through with can be seen the Noah and his family on the upper deck, birds on the middle deck, while on the lower are the pairs of animals. Another scene shows with great vigour the swamping of Pharaoh's army by the Red Sea. The scheme extends to other parts of the church, with the martyrdom of the local saints shown in the crypt, and Apocalypse in the narthex and Christ in Majesty. The range of colours employed is limited to light blue-green, yellow ochre, reddish brown and black. Similar paintings exist in Serbia, Spain, Germany, Italy and elsewhere in France.

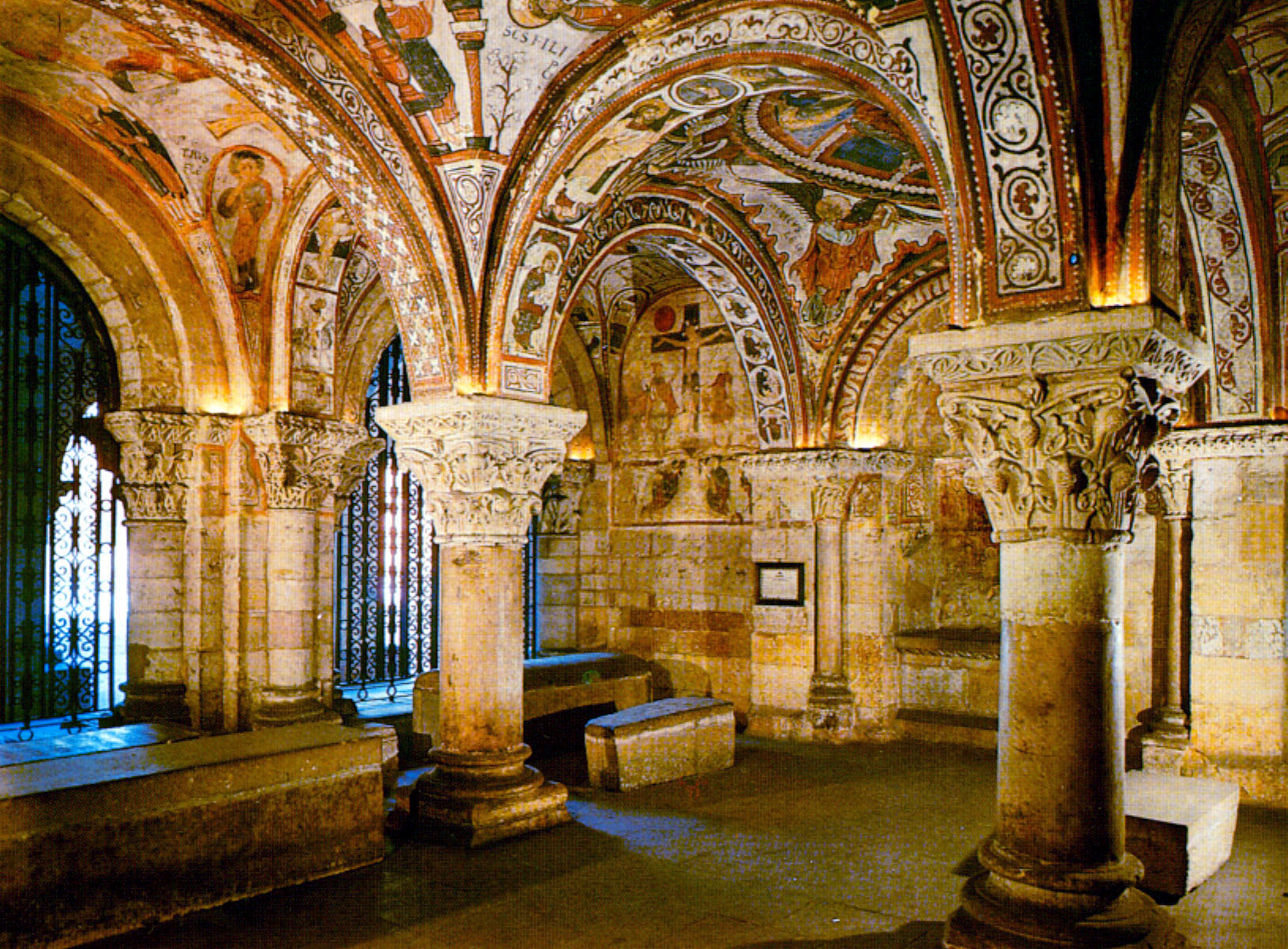
The painted crypt of San Isidoro in León, Spain, has a detailed scheme illustrating Biblical stories.

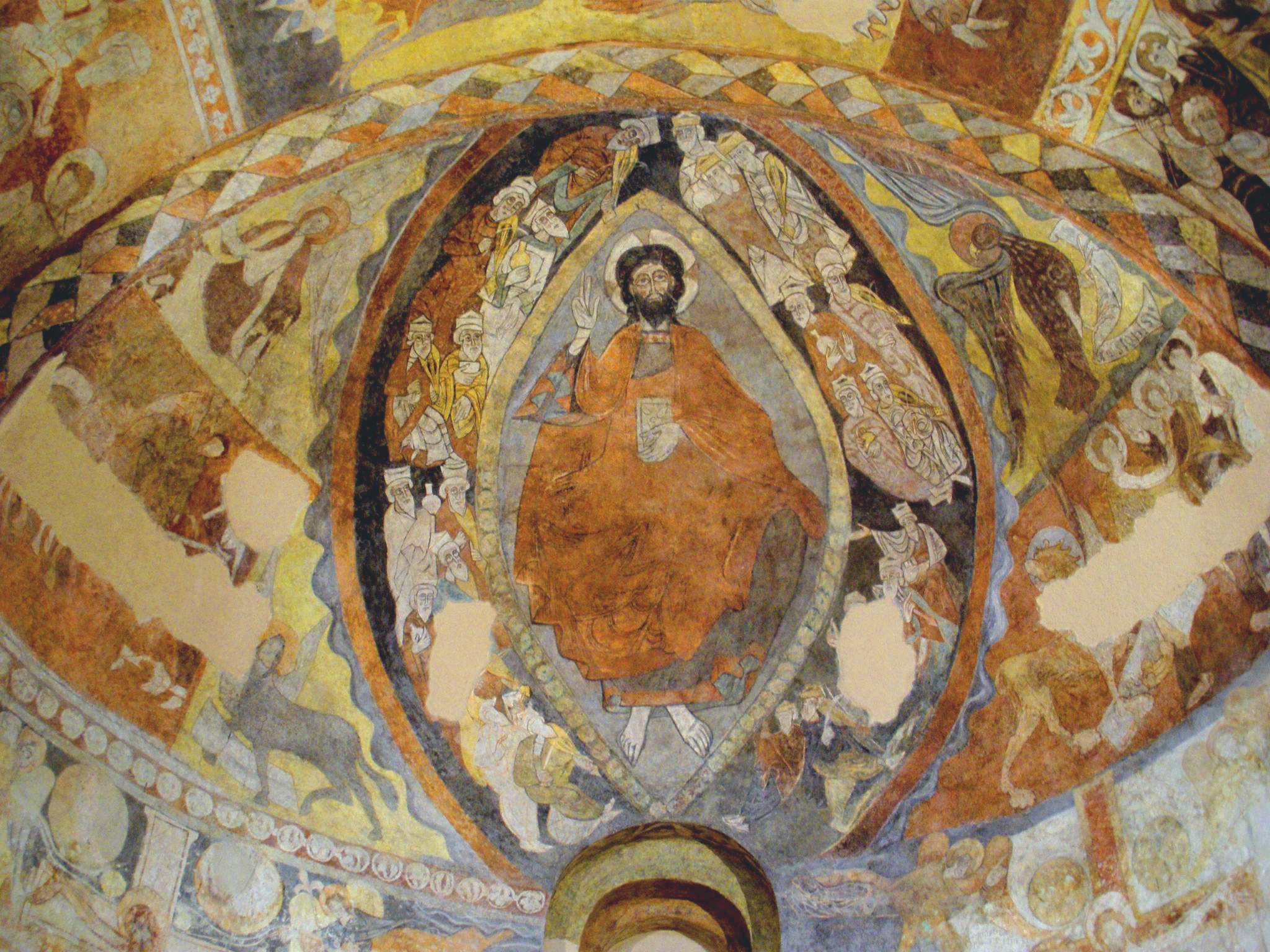
Apse of the Church of St Justus, Segovia. Christ in Majesty was a common theme for the apse.

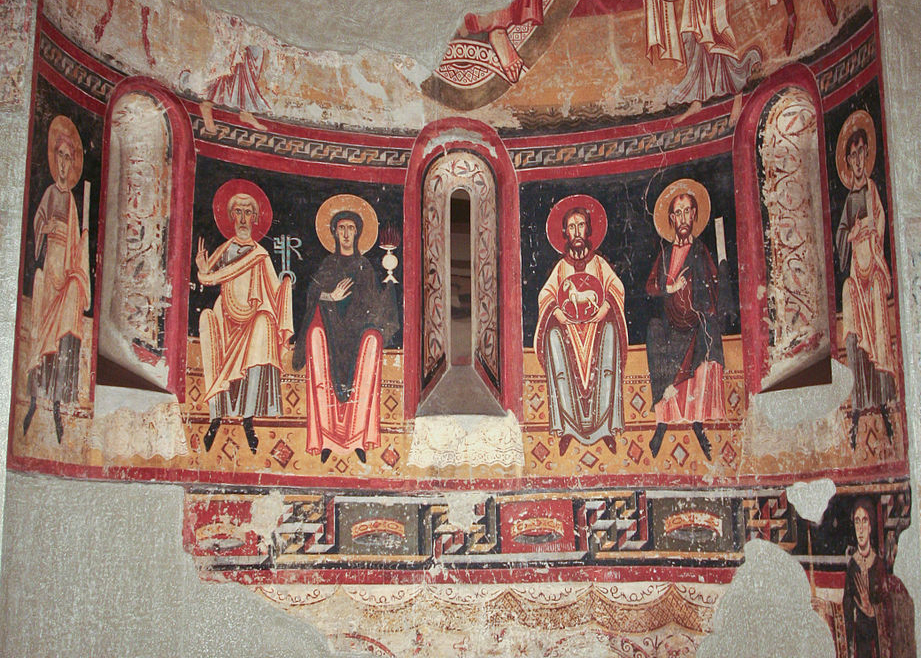
A frieze of figures occupies the zone below the semi-dome in the apse. Abbey of St Pere of Burgal, Catalonia, Spain.

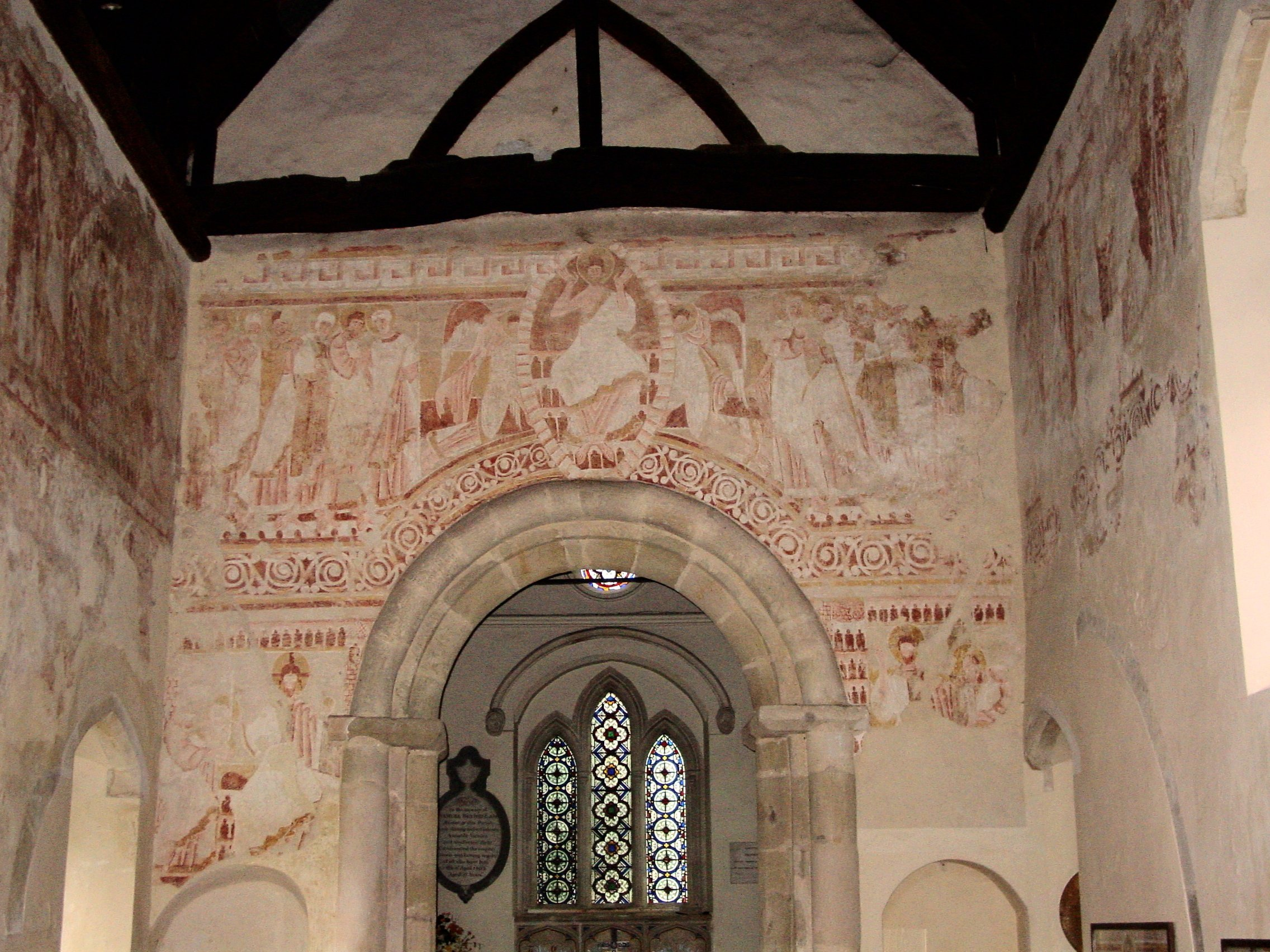
In England the major pictorial theme occurs above the chancel arch in parish churches. St John the Baptist, Clayton, Sussex.

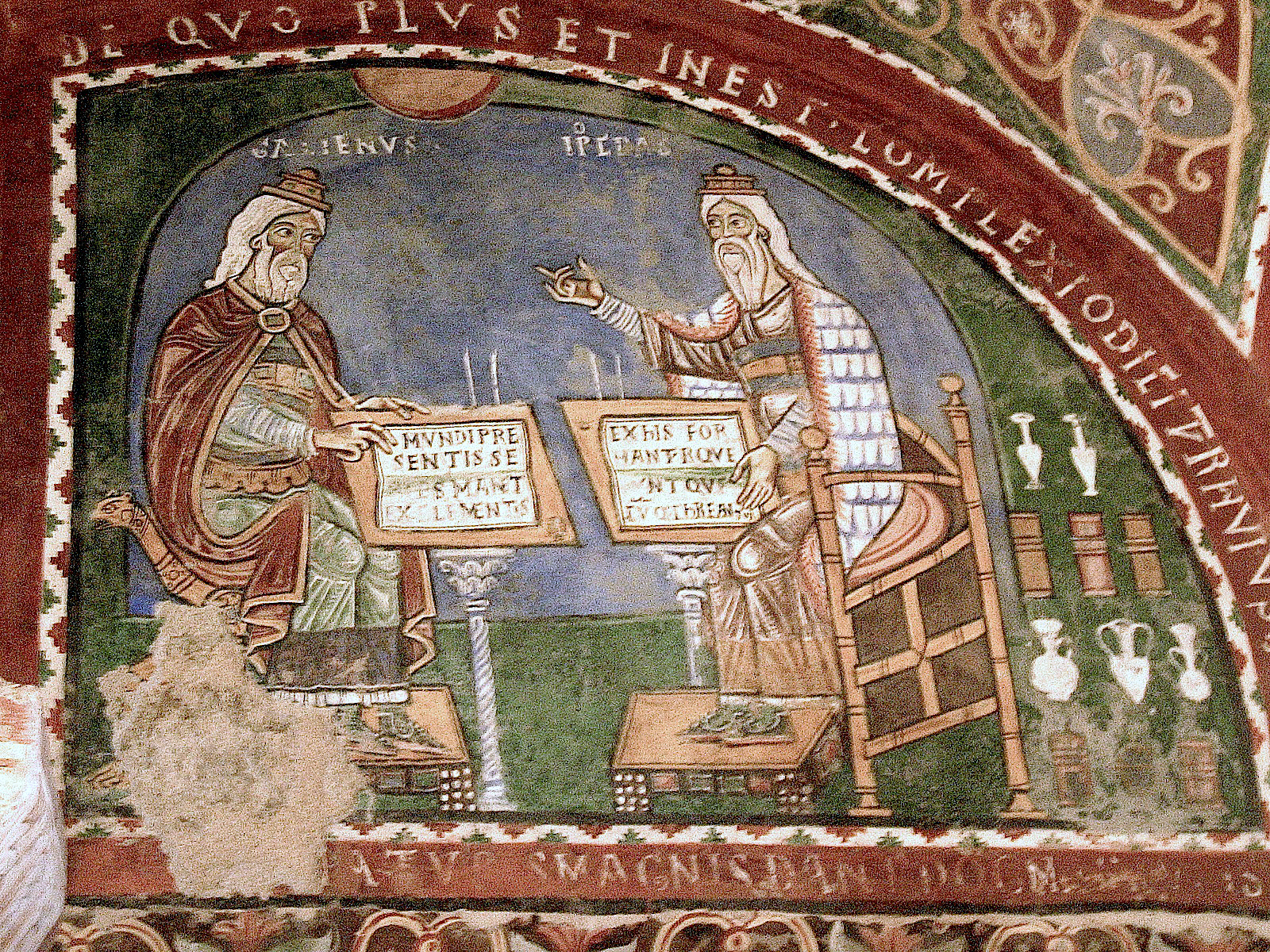
This fresco showing Galen and Hippocrates is part of a complex scheme decorating the crypt of Anagni Cathedral, Italy.

==== Stained glass ====
The oldest-known fragments of medieval pictorial stained glass appear to date from the 10th century. The earliest intact figures are five prophet windows at Augsburg, dating from the late 11th century. The figures, though stiff and formalised, demonstrate considerable proficiency in design, both pictorially and in the functional use of the glass, indicating that their maker was well accustomed to the medium. At Canterbury and Chartres Cathedrals, a number of panels of the 12th century have survived, including, at Canterbury, a figure of Adam digging, and another of his son Seth from a series of Ancestors of Christ. Adam represents a highly naturalistic and lively portrayal, while in the figure of Seth, the robes have been used to great decorative effect, similar to the best stone carving of the period.

Many of the magnificent stained glass windows of France, including the famous windows of Chartres, date from the 13th century. Far fewer large windows remain intact from the 12th century. One such is the Crucifixion of Poitiers, a remarkable composition that rises through three stages, the lowest with a quatrefoil depicting the Martyrdom of St Peter, the largest central stage dominated by the crucifixion and the upper stage showing the Ascension of Christ in a mandorla. The figure of the crucified Christ is already showing the Gothic curve. The window is described by George Seddon as being of "unforgettable beauty".

Stained glass from Germany, England and France. Note: the scale of the first three windows is similar.

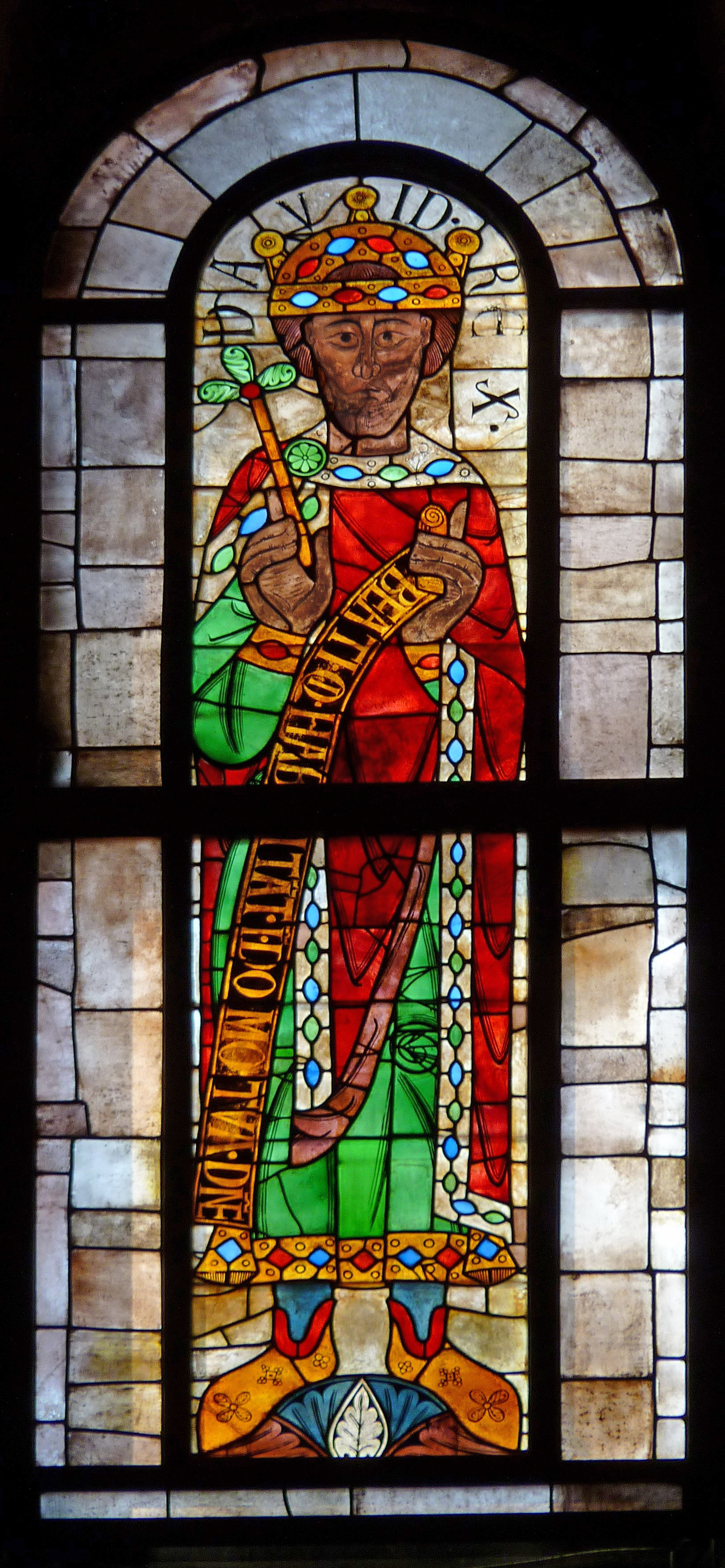
King David from Augsburg Cathedral, late 11th century. One of a series of prophets that are the oldest stained glass windows in situ.

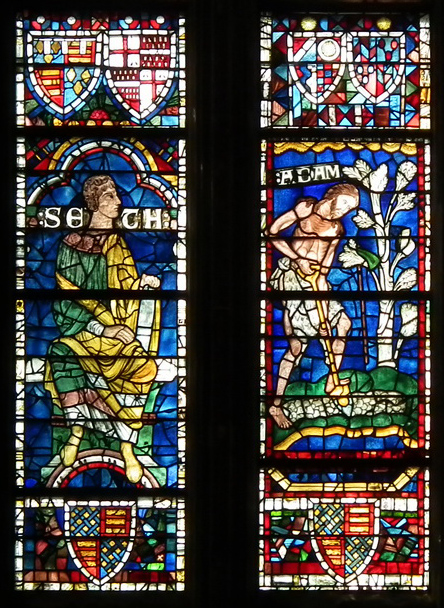
Two panels of lively figures, Seth and Adam from the 12th-century Ancestors of Christ, Canterbury Cathedral, now set into a Perpendicular Gothic window with panels of many different dates

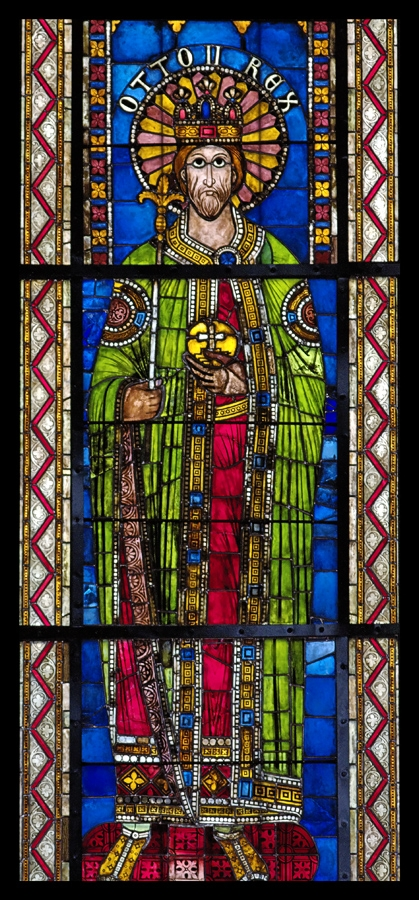
Otto II, Holy Roman Emperor, from a series of Emperors (12th and 13th centuries). The panels are now set into Gothic windows, Strasbourg Cathedral.

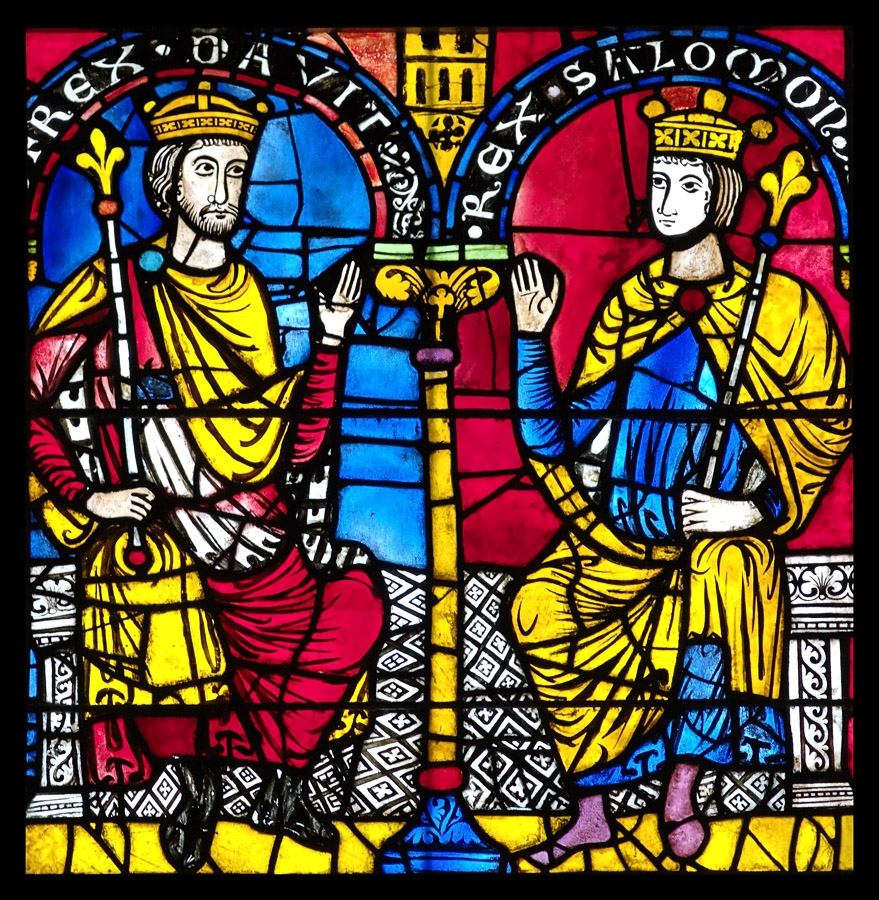
Detail of a small panel showing Kings David and Solomon set in an architectonic frame from a large window at Strasbourg. Late 12th century. The alternation of red and blue is a typical device of simpler window designs. It is approximately 1/3 the height, and is much less complex in execution than the Emperor series of which Otto II is a part. See left

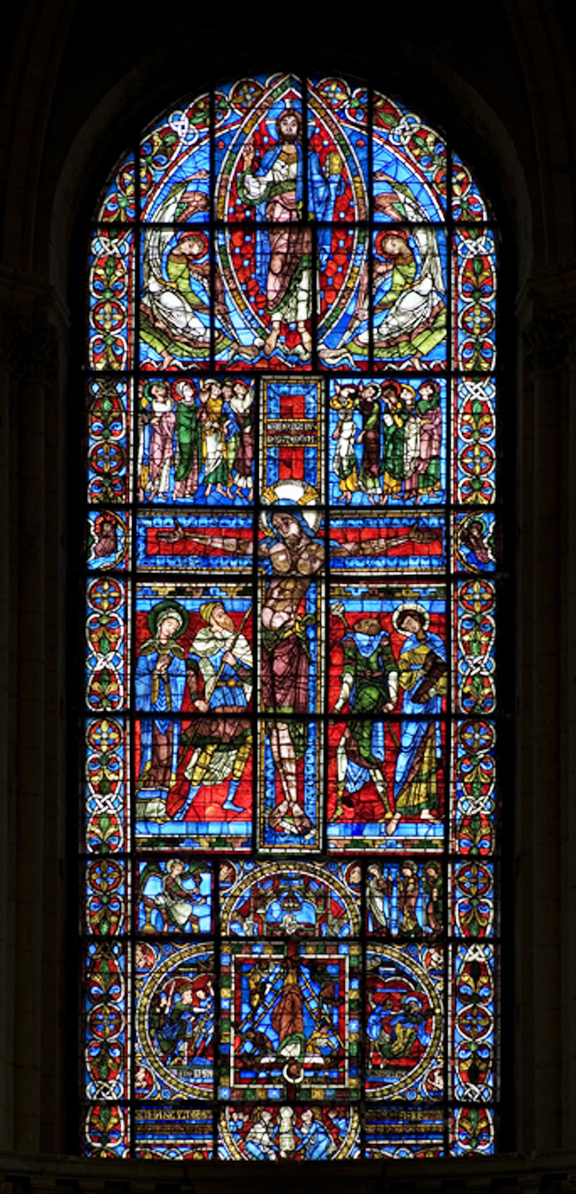
A rare and remarkable survival, of "unforgettable beauty", the very large Crucifixion window of Poitiers Cathedral, France

=== Transitional style and the continued use of Romanesque forms ===
During the 12th century, features that were to become typical of Gothic architecture began to appear. It is not uncommon, for example, for a part of building that has been constructed over a lengthy period extending into the 12th century, to have very similar arcading of both semi-circular and pointed shape, or windows that are identical in height and width, but in which the later ones are pointed. This can be seen on the towers of Tournai Cathedral and on the western towers and façade at Ely Cathedral. Other variations that appear to hover between Romanesque and Gothic occur, such as the façade designed by Abbot Suger at the Abbey of Saint-Denis, which retains much that is Romanesque in its appearance, and the façade of Laon Cathedral, which, despite its Gothic form, has round arches.

Abbot Suger's innovative choir of the Abbey of Saint-Denis, 1140–44, led to the adoption of the Gothic style by Paris and its surrounding area, but other parts of France were slower to take it up, and provincial churches continued to be built in the heavy manner and rubble stone of the Romanesque, even when the openings were treated with the fashionable pointed arch.

In England, the Romanesque groundplan, which in that country commonly had a very long nave, continued to affect the style of building of cathedrals and those large abbey churches which were also to become cathedrals at the dissolution of the monasteries in the 16th century. Despite the fact that English cathedrals were built or rebuilt in many stages, substantial areas of Norman building can be seen in many of them, particularly in the nave arcades. In the case of Winchester Cathedral, the Gothic arches were literally carved out of the existent Norman piers. Other cathedrals have sections of their building which are clearly an intermediate stage between Norman and Gothic, such as the western towers of Ely Cathedral and part of the nave at Worcester Cathedral. The first truly Gothic building in England is the long eastern end of Canterbury Cathedral commenced in 1175.

In Italy, although many churches such as Florence Cathedral and Santa Maria Novella were built in the Gothic style, or utilising the pointed arch and window tracery, Romanesque features derived from the Roman architectural heritage, such as sturdy columns with capitals of a modified Corinthian form, continued to be used. The pointed vault was utilised where convenient, but it is commonly interspersed with semicircular arches and vaults wherever they conveniently fit. The façades of Gothic churches in Italy are not always easily distinguishable from the Romanesque.

Germany was not quick to adopt the Gothic style, and when it did so in the 1230s, the buildings were often modelled very directly upon French cathedrals, as Cologne Cathedral was modelled on Amiens. The smaller churches and abbeys continued to be constructed in a more provincial Romanesque manner, the date only being registered by the pointed window openings.

Churches showing the transition between Romanesque and Gothic

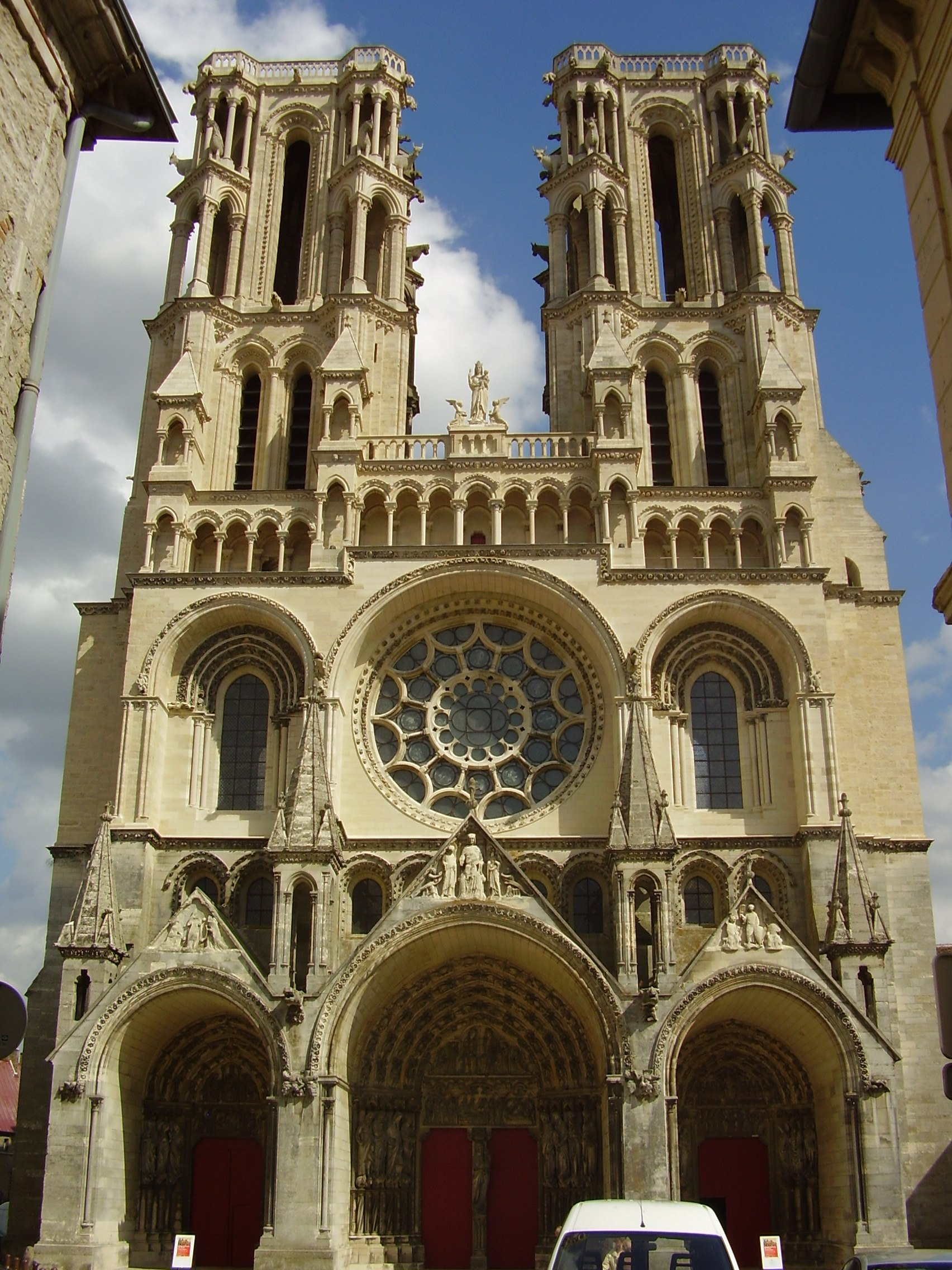
The façade of Laon Cathedral, 1225, a Gothic cathedral, maintains rounded arches and arcading in the Romanesque manner.

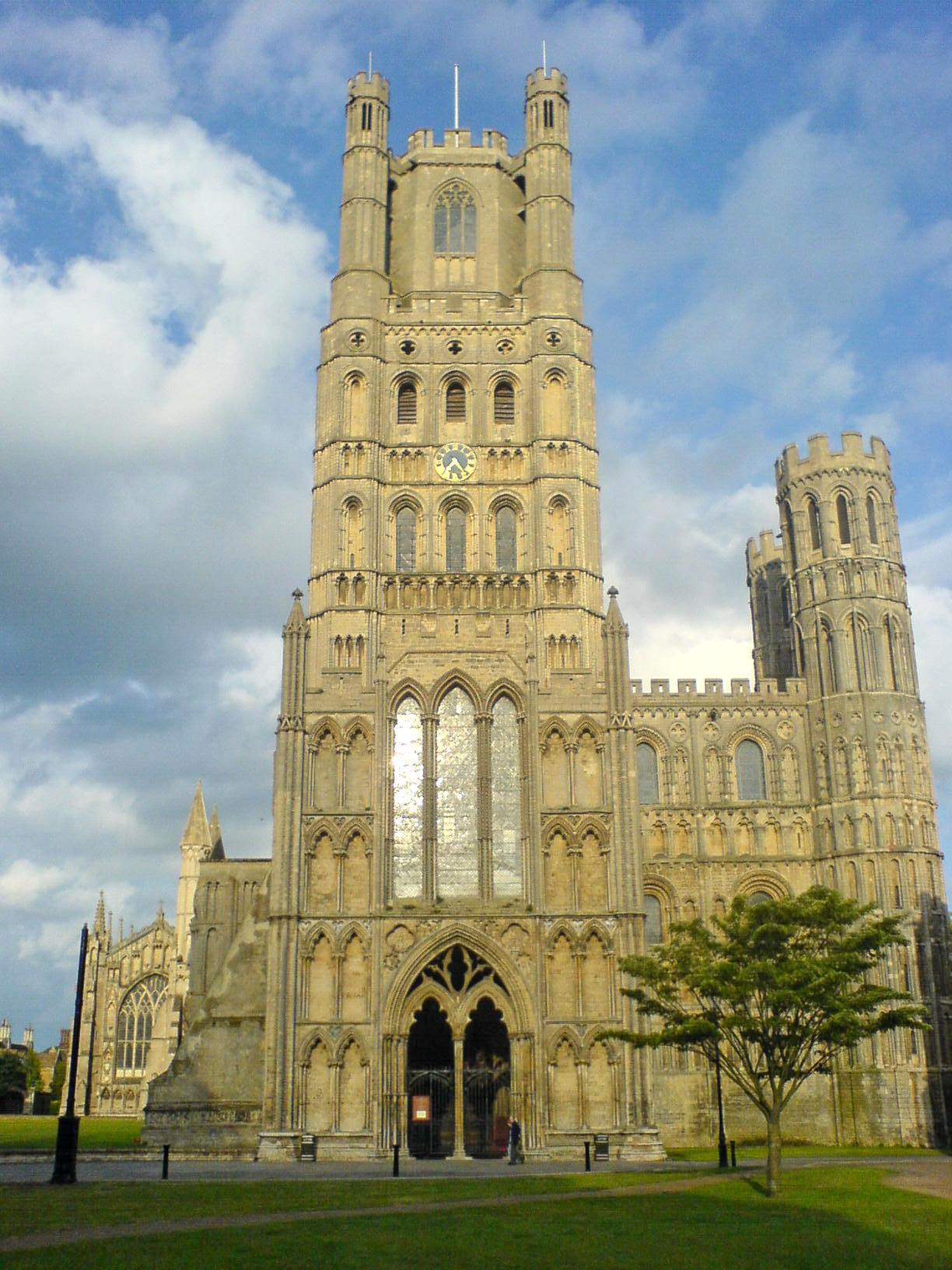
Ely Cathedral, England, the central western tower and framing smaller towers all had transitional features, 1180s. The tower to the left fell. Gothic porch, 1250s; lantern, 1390s.

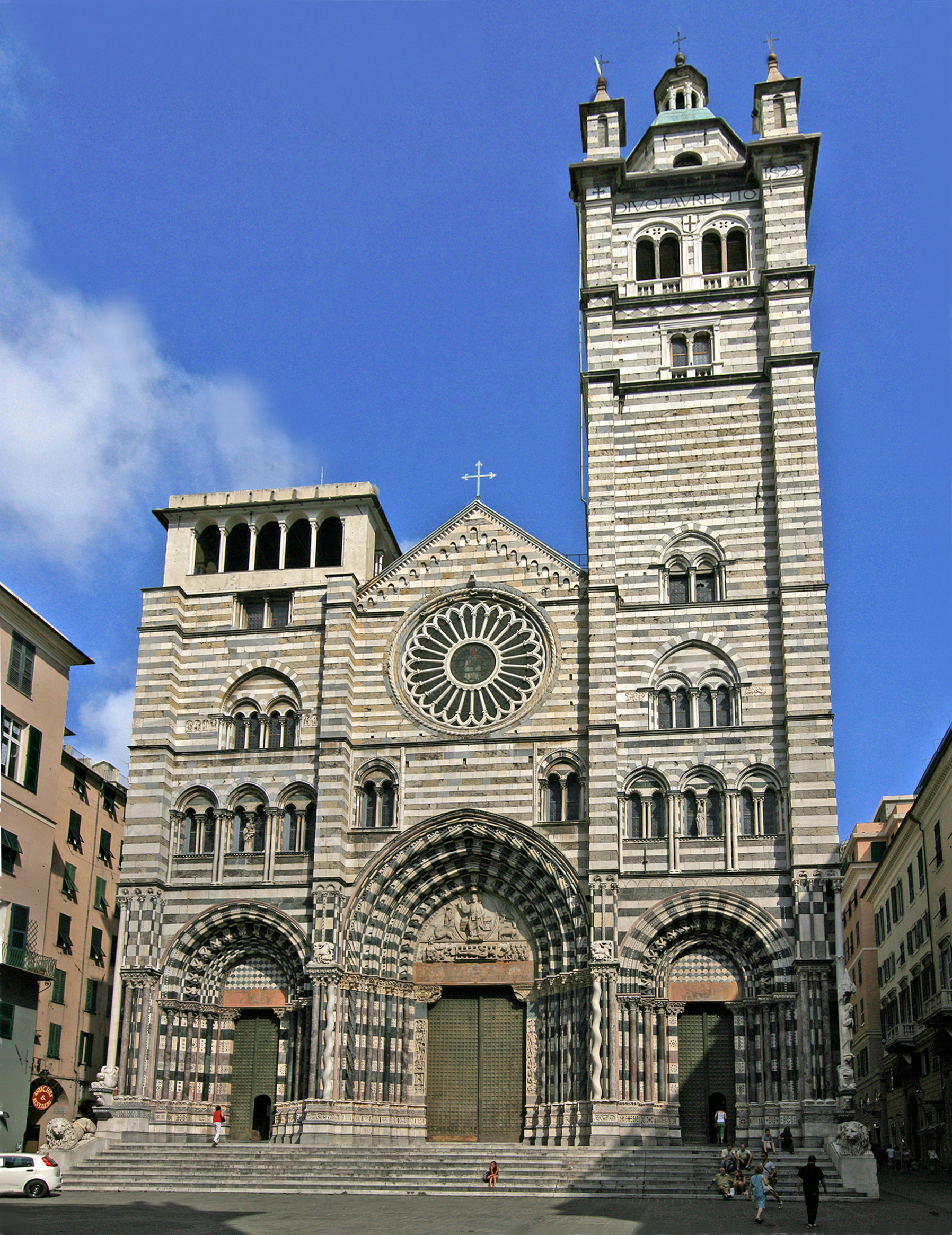
The façade of the Cathedral of Genoa has both round and pointed arches, and paired windows, a continuing Romanesque feature of Italian Gothic architecture.

== Romanesque castles, houses and other buildings ==
The Romanesque period was a time of great development in the design and construction of defensive architecture. After churches and the monastic buildings with which they are often associated, castles are the most numerous type of building of the period. While most are in ruins through the action of war and politics, others, like William the Conqueror's White Tower within the Tower of London have remained almost intact.

In some regions, particularly Germany, large palaces were built for rulers and bishops. Local lords built great halls in the countryside, while rich merchants built grand town houses. In Italy, city councils constructed town halls (called Broletto or Arengario), while wealthy cities of Northern Europe protected their trading interests with warehouses and commercial premises. All over Europe, dwellers of the town and country built houses to live in, some of which, sturdily constructed in stone, have remained to this day with sufficient of their form and details intact to give a picture of the style of domestic architecture that was in fashion at the time.

Examples of all these types of buildings can be found scattered across Europe, sometimes as isolated survivals like the two merchants' houses on opposite sides of Steep Hill in Lincoln, England, and sometimes giving form to a whole medieval city like San Gimignano in Tuscany, Italy. These buildings are the subject of a separate article.

Secular and domestic architecture

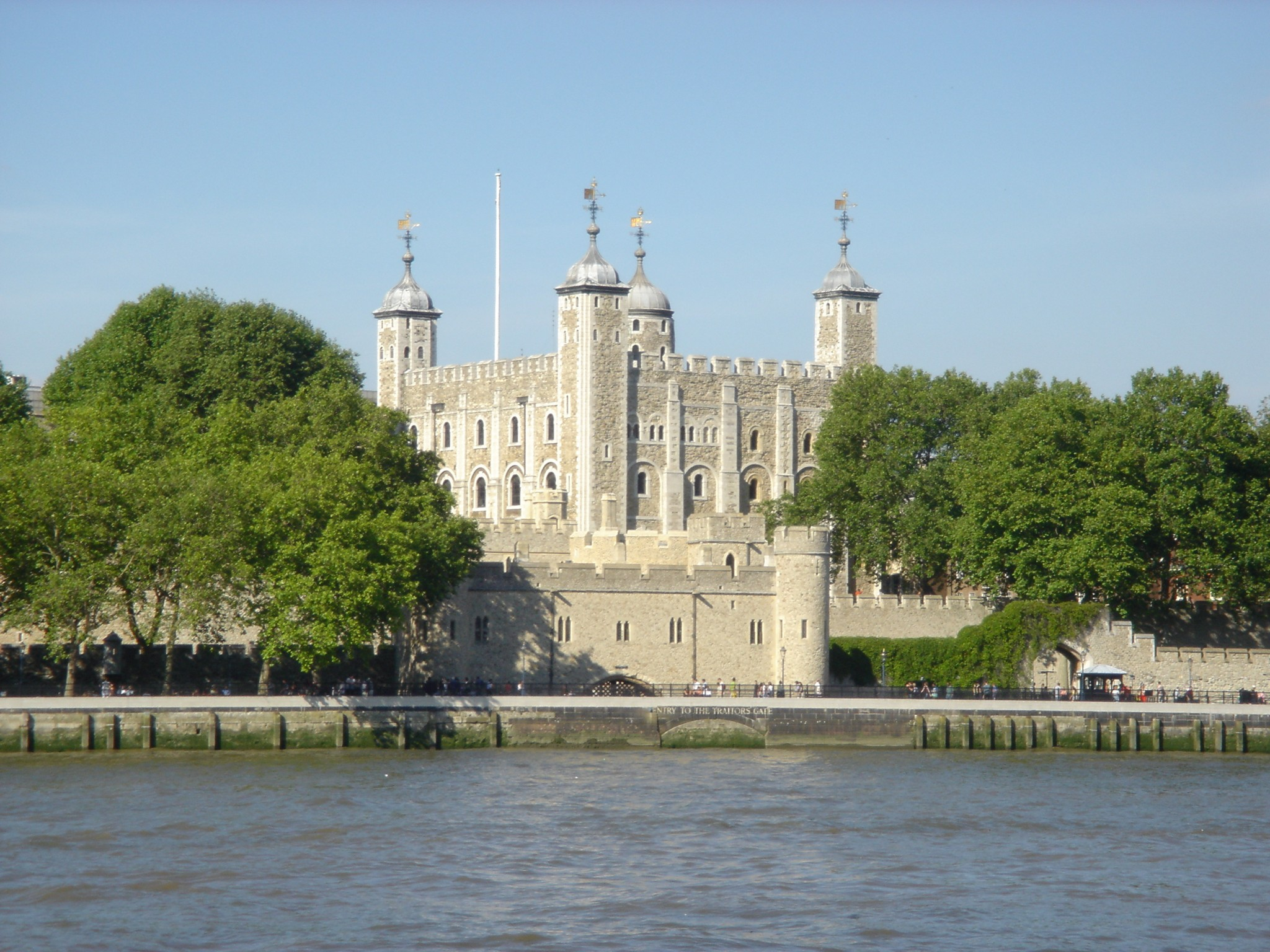
Tower of London (1078); William the Conqueror built the central White Tower as his stronghold and residence.

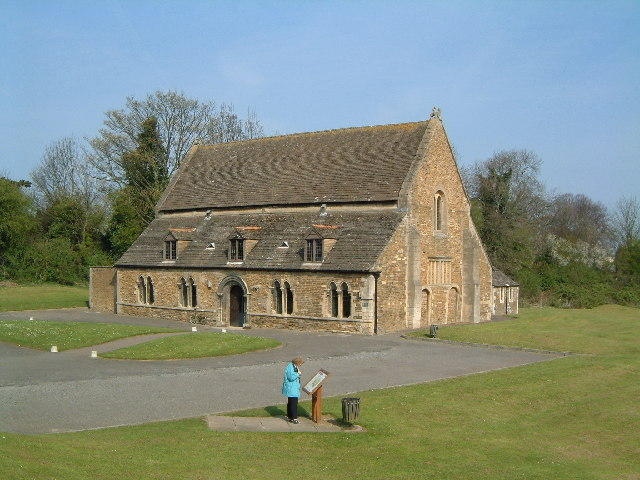
The Great Hall of Oakham Castle, England, once part of the fortified manor of a Norman baron

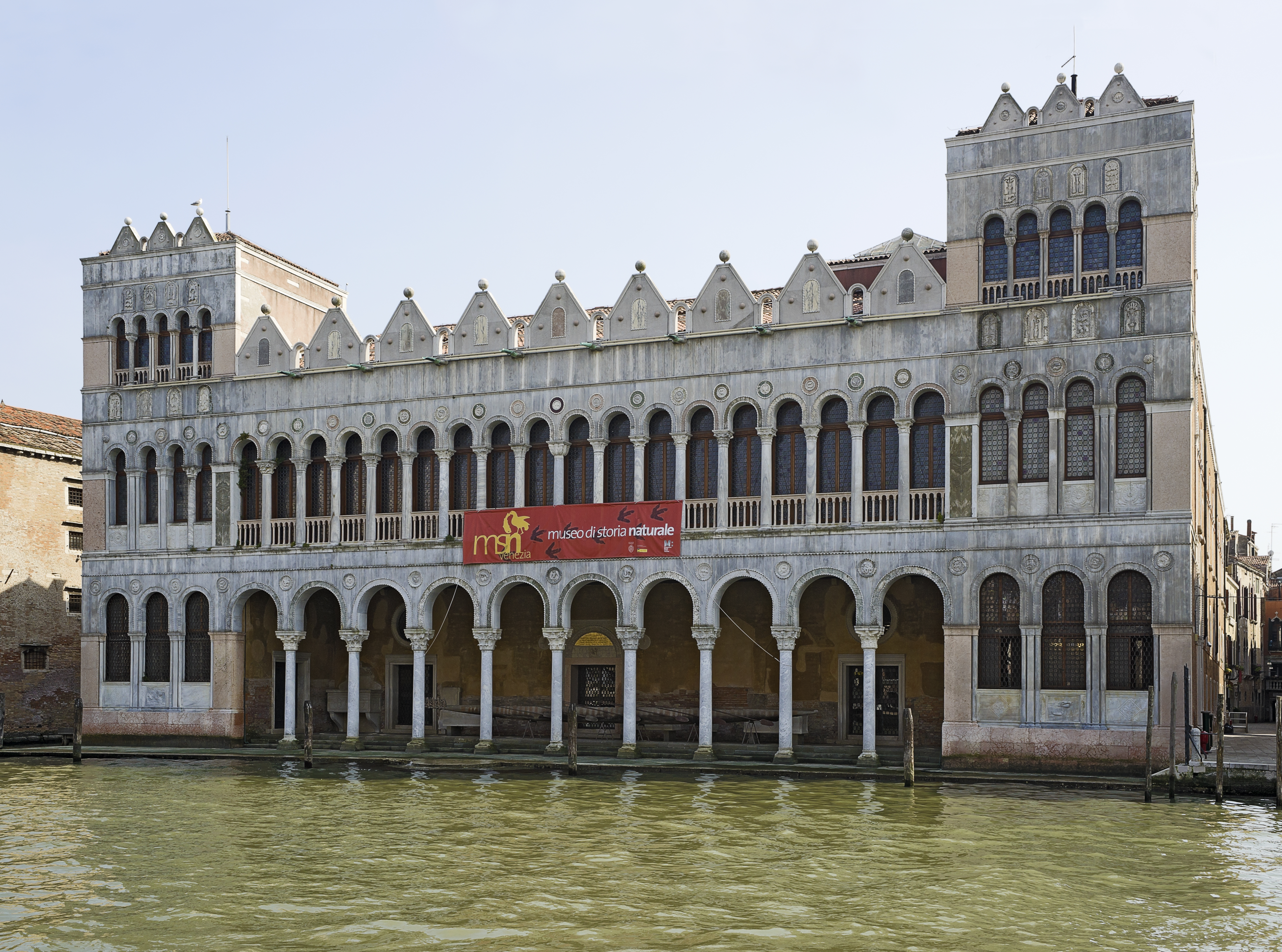
The Fondaco dei Turchi in Venice.

== Romanesque Revival ==
See also Romanesque Revival architecture in the United Kingdom During the 19th century, when Gothic Revival architecture was fashionable, buildings were occasionally designed in the Romanesque style. There are a number of Romanesque Revival churches, dating from as early as the 1830s and continuing into the 20th century where the massive and "brutal" quality of the Romanesque style was appreciated and designed in brick.

The Natural History Museum, London, designed by Alfred Waterhouse, 1879, on the other hand, is a Romanesque revival building that makes full use of the decorative potential of Romanesque arcading and architectural sculpture. The Romanesque appearance has been achieved while freely adapting an overall style to suit the function of the building. The columns of the foyer, for example, give an impression of incised geometric design similar to those of Durham Cathedral. However, the sources of the incised patterns are the trunks of palms, cycads and tropical tree ferns. The animal motifs, of which there are many, include rare and exotic species.

The type of modern buildings for which the Romanesque style was most frequently adapted was the warehouse, where a lack of large windows and an appearance of great strength and stability were desirable features. These buildings, generally of brick, frequently have flattened buttresses rising to wide arches at the upper levels after the manner of some Italian Romanesque façades. This style was adapted to suit commercial buildings by opening the spaces between the arches into large windows, the brick walls becoming a shell to a building that was essentially of modern steel-frame construction, the architect Henry Hobson Richardson giving his name to the style, Richardsonian Romanesque.

Good examples of the style are Marshall Field's Wholesale Store, Chicago, by H.H. Richardson, 1885, and the Chadwick Lead Works in Boston, United States, by William Preston, 1887. The style also lent itself to the building of cloth mills, steelworks and powerstations.

Romanesque Revival architecture

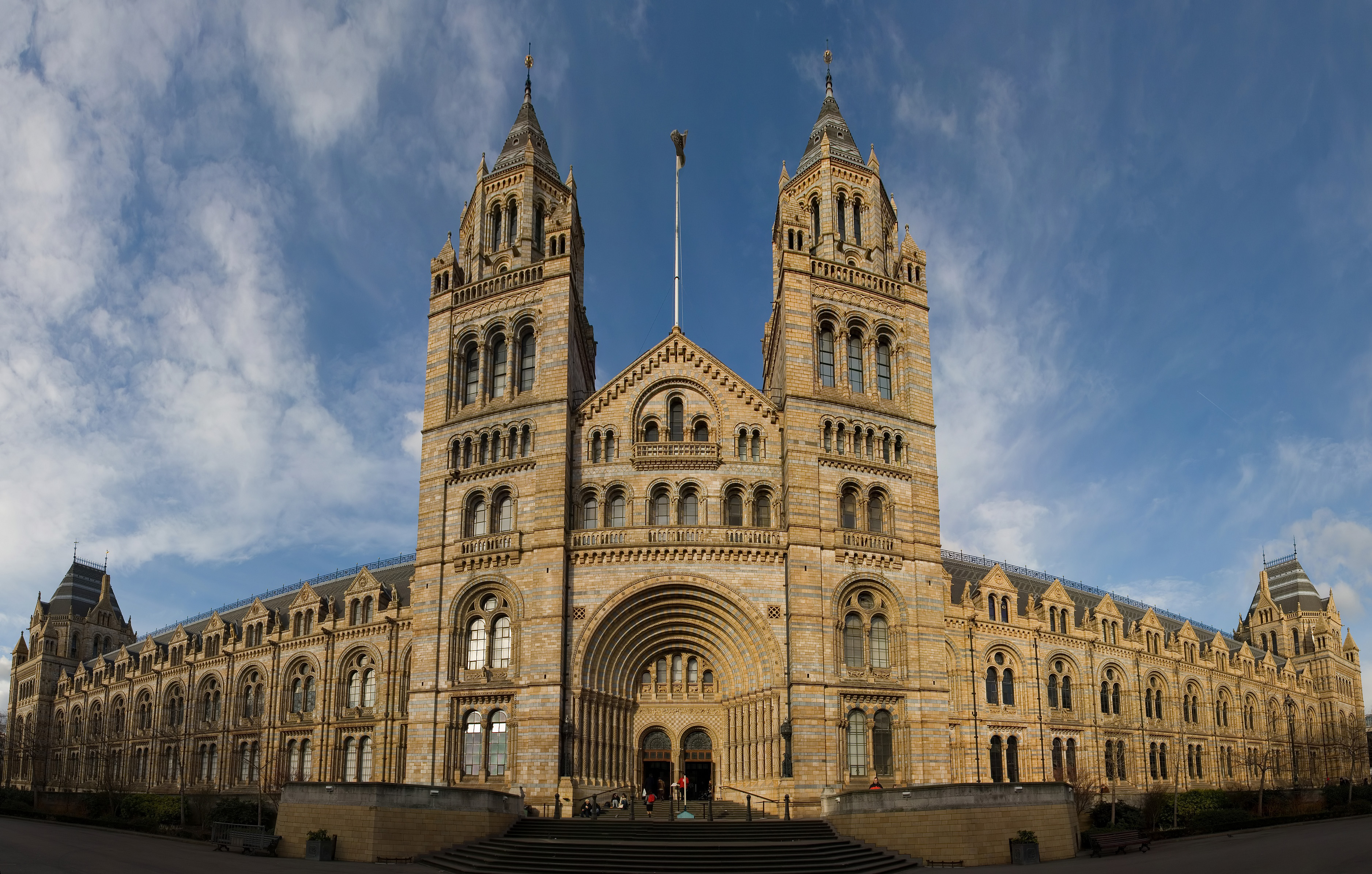
Natural History Museum, London, Alfred Waterhouse, 1879

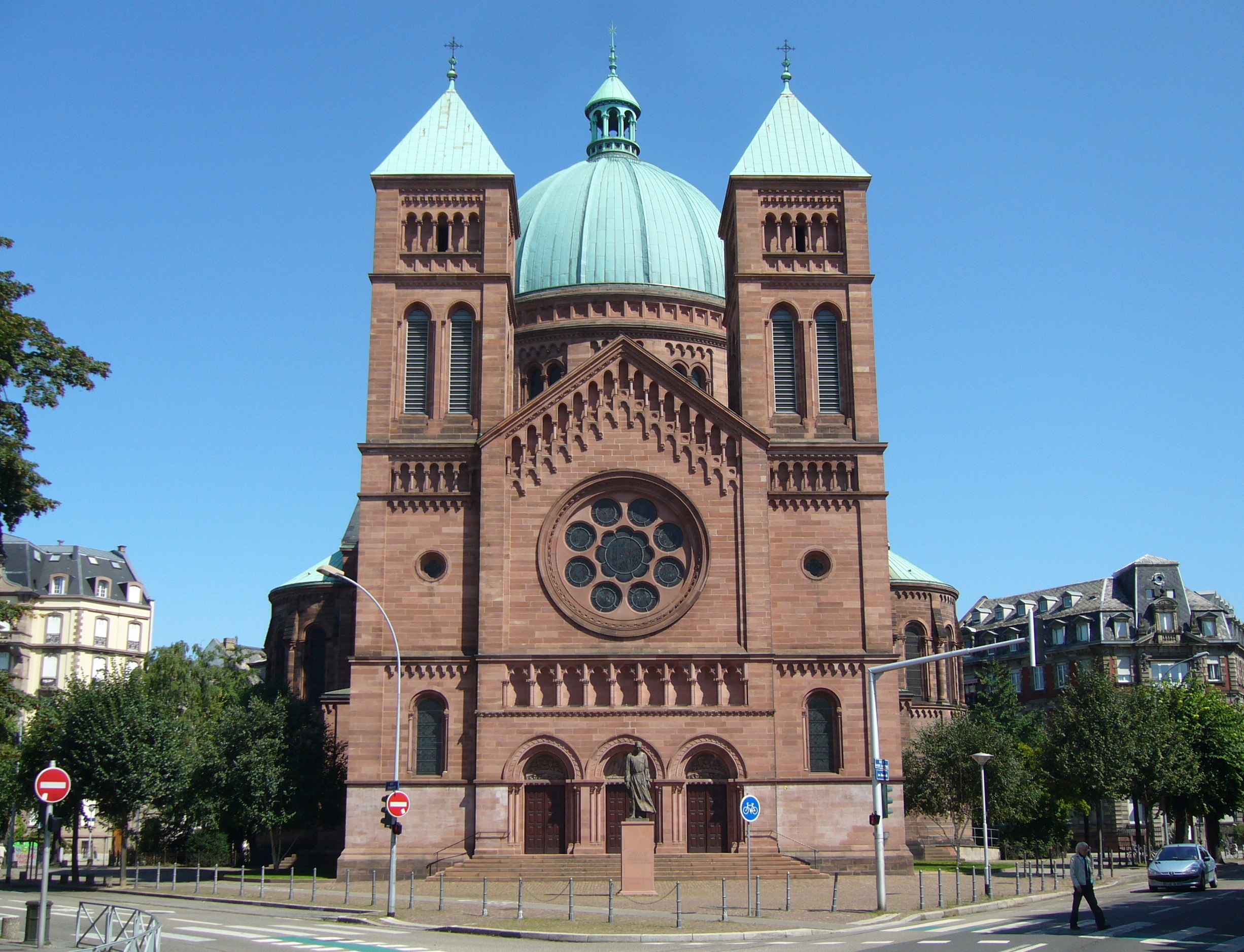
The façade of Catholic church of Saint-Pierre-le-Jeune, Strasbourg (built 1888–1893), is of a type adopted for many churches in the early 20th century.

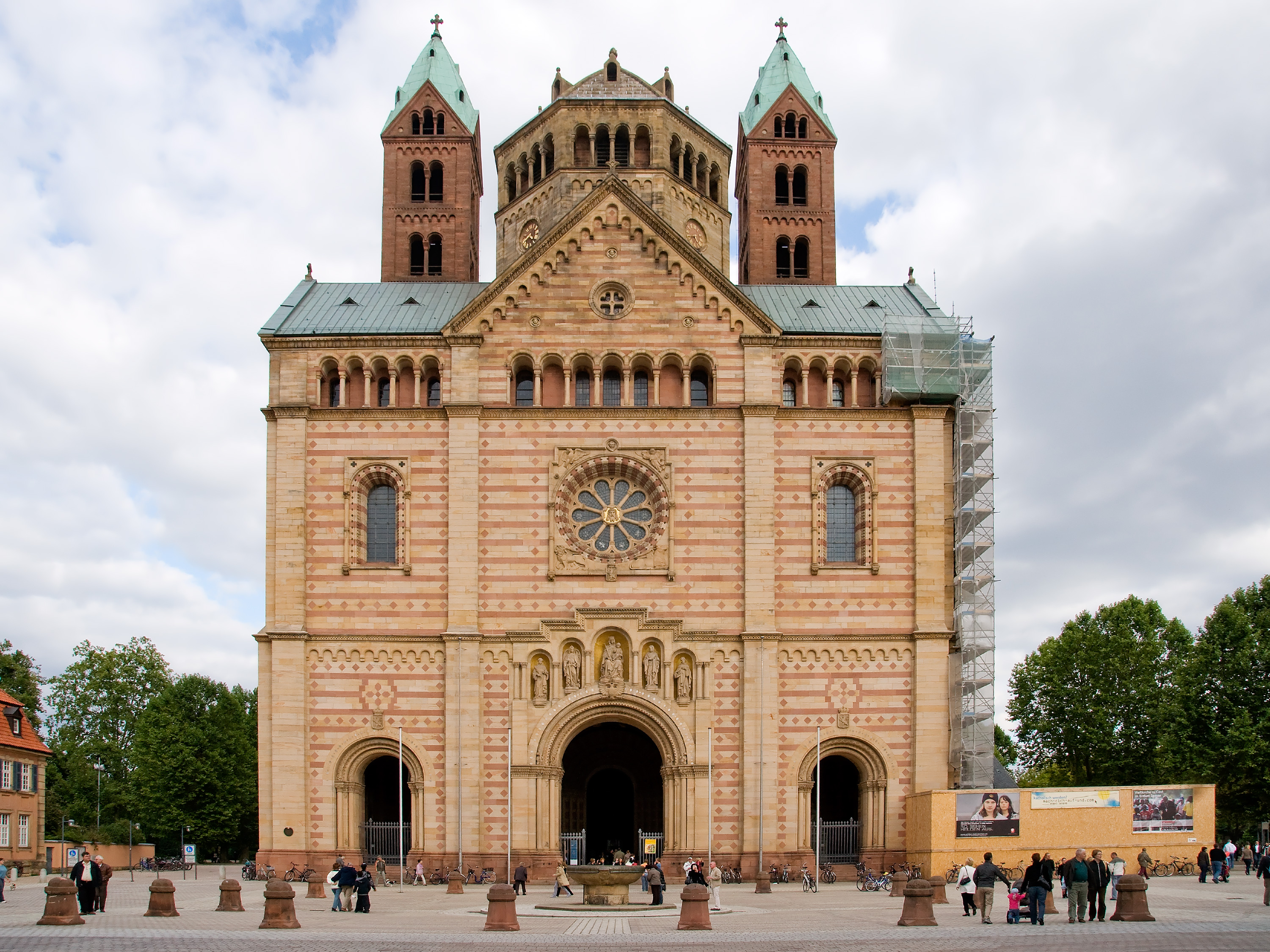
The 19th-century reconstruction of the westwerk of the Romanesque Speyer Cathedral. see above

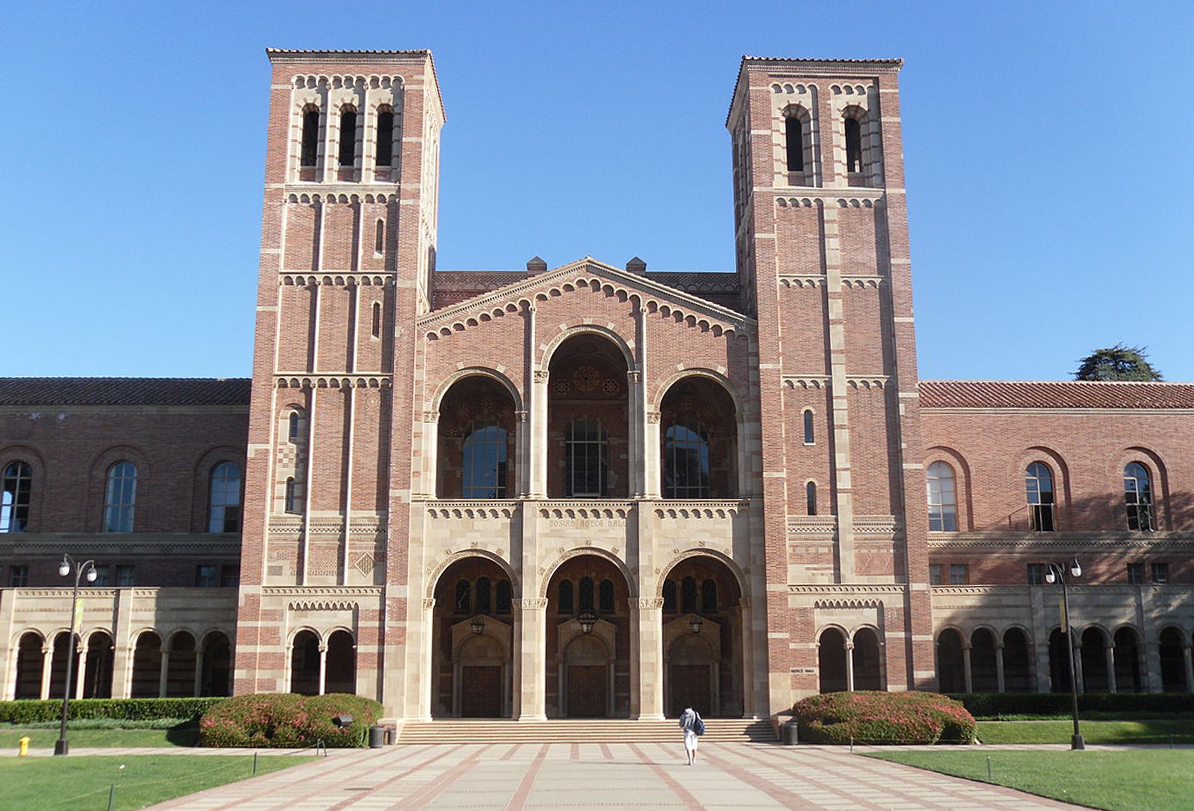
Royce Hall, at UCLA, inspired by The Basilica of Sant'Ambrogio in Milan, Italy. see above

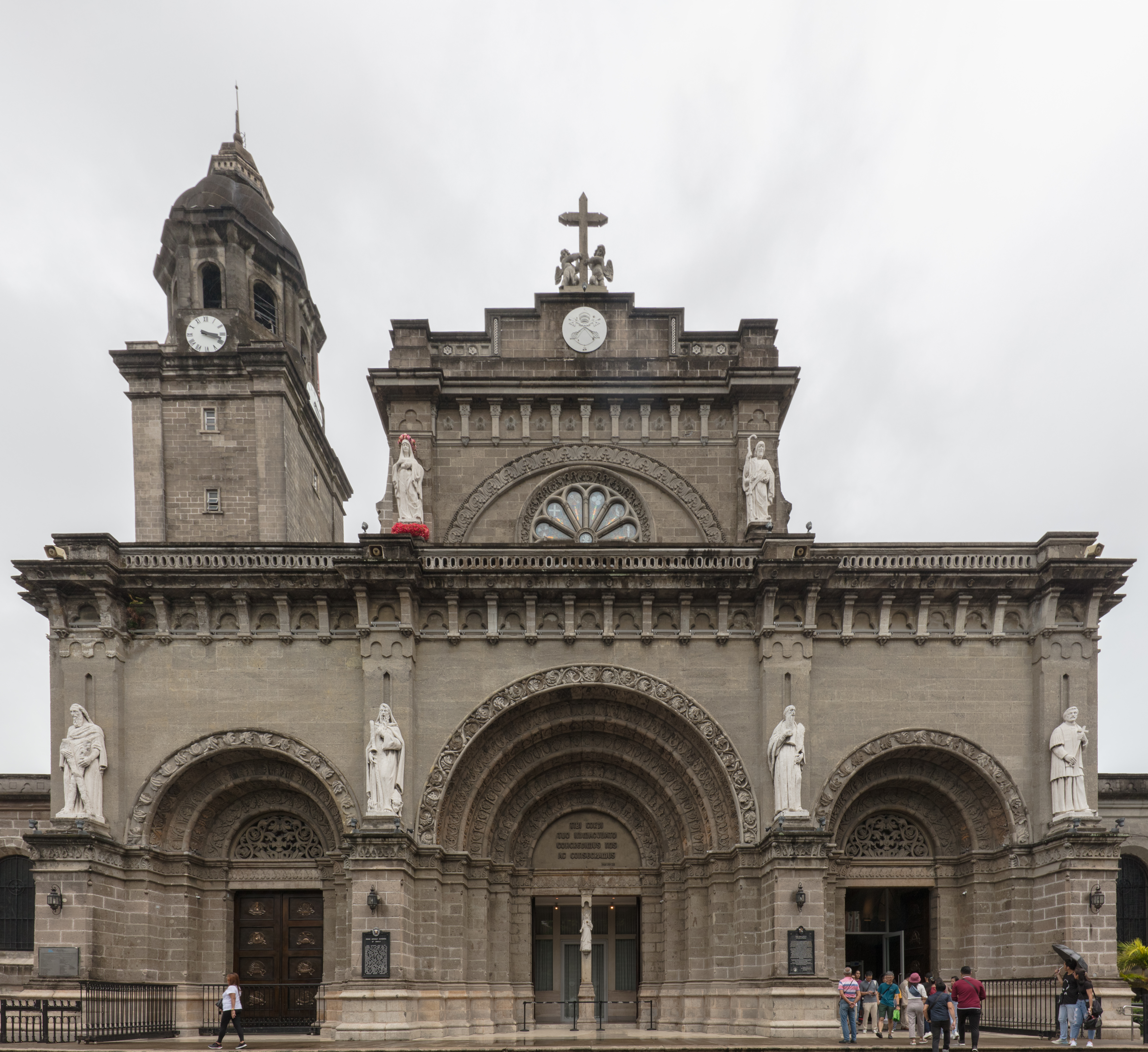
Manila Cathedral, Intramuros, Manila, Philippines

== See also ==
- Regional Styles
  - France
  - Norman
  - Lombardy
  - Pisa
  - Poland
  - Portugal
  - Sardinia
  - Spain
- List
  - Buildings
  - Brick buildings

== Sources ==
- Clarke, Michael; Clarke, Deborah (1 January 2010). "Romanesque". The Concise Oxford Dictionary of Art Terms. Oxford University Press. doi:10.1093/acref/9780199569922.001.0001. ISBN 978-0-19-956992-2.
- Fernie, Eric (1991). "The History of Medieval Architecture from Carolingian to Romanesque: Criteria and Definitions from 1925 to the Present Day". Muqarnas. 8 (K. A. C. Creswell and His Legacy). Brill: 36–39. doi:10.2307/1523150. JSTOR 1523150.
- Hicks, Carola (1 January 2001). "Romanesque". The Oxford Companion to Western Art. Oxford University Press. doi:10.1093/acref/9780198662037.001.0001. ISBN 978-0-19-866203-7.
- Jones, Tom Devonshire; Murray, Linda; Murray, Peter, eds. (2013). The Oxford Dictionary of Christian Art and Architecture (illustrated ed.). Oxford University Press. ISBN 978-0-199-68027-6.
- Porter, Arthur Kingsley (1975) [1928]. Spanish Romanesque Sculpture, Volume 1 (illustrated ed.). Hacker Art Books. ISBN 9780878170333.
- "Romanesque". The Oxford Dictionary of Art. Oxford University Press. 1 January 2004. doi:10.1093/acref/9780198604761.001.0001. ISBN 978-0-19-860476-1.
- "Romanesque, n. & adj". Oxford English Dictionary. Oxford University Press. 2 March 2023. doi:10.1093/oed/9822227393.
- Rudolph, Conrad, ed. (15 April 2019). A Companion to Medieval Art: Romanesque and Gothic in Northern Europe (2nd ed.). Wiley. doi:10.1002/9781119077756. ISBN 978-1-119-07772-5.
  - Rudolph, Conrad (15 April 2019). "Introduction: A Sense of Loss: An Overview of the Historiography of Romanesque and Gothic Art". A Companion to Medieval Art. Wiley. pp. 1–43. doi:10.1002/9781119077756.ch1. ISBN 978-1-119-07772-5. S2CID 240902117.
  - Fernie, Eric (15 April 2019). "Definitions and Explanations of the Romanesque Style in Architecture from the 1960s to the Present Day". A Companion to Medieval Art. Wiley. pp. 407–416. doi:10.1002/9781119077756.ch17. ISBN 978-1-119-07772-5. S2CID 191987533.
- Stephenson, Davis; Hammond, Victoria; Davi, Keith F. (2005). Visions of Heaven: the Dome in European Architecture (illustrated ed.). Princeton Architectural Press. p. 174. ISBN 978-1-56898-549-7.
- Valdes, G.; Pistolesi, A.; Pauli, E. (1994). "Pisan Romanesque". Art and History of Pisa. Art and History Series. Bonechi. p. 7. ISBN 978-88-8029-024-7.
